= List of peers 1520–1529 =

This page lists all peers who held extant titles between 1520 and 1529.

== Peerage of England ==
Title	Holder	Date gained	Date lost	Notes
Duke of Cornwall (1337)	none	1514	1537	
Duke of Buckingham (1444)	Edward Stafford, 3rd Duke of Buckingham	1485	1521	Attained, and his honours became forfeited
Duke of Norfolk (1483)	Thomas Howard, 2nd Duke of Norfolk	1514	1524	Died
Duke of Norfolk (1483)	Thomas Howard, 3rd Duke of Norfolk	1524	1547	
Duke of Suffolk (1514)	Charles Brandon, 1st Duke of Suffolk	1514	1545	Surrendered the Viscountcy of Lisle in 1523
Duke of Richmond and Somerset (1525)	Henry FitzRoy, 1st Duke of Richmond and Somerset	1525	1536	New creation, also Earl of Nottingham
Marquess of Dorset (1475)	Thomas Grey, 2nd Marquess of Dorset	1501	1530	
Marquess of Exeter (1525)	Henry Courtenay, 1st Marquess of Exeter	1525	1539	New creation
Earl of Arundel (1138)	Thomas FitzAlan, 17th Earl of Arundel	1487	1524	Died
Earl of Arundel (1138)	William FitzAlan, 18th Earl of Arundel	1524	1544	
Earl of Oxford (1142)	John de Vere, 14th Earl of Oxford	1513	1526	Died
Earl of Oxford (1142)	John de Vere, 15th Earl of Oxford	1526	1540	
Earl of Salisbury (1337)	Margaret Pole, Countess of Salisbury	1513	1539	
Earl of Westmorland (1397)	Ralph Neville, 4th Earl of Westmorland	1499	1549	
Earl of Northumberland (1416)	Henry Percy, 5th Earl of Northumberland	1489	1527	Died
Earl of Northumberland (1416)	Henry Percy, 6th Earl of Northumberland	1527	1537	
Earl of Shrewsbury (1442)	George Talbot, 4th Earl of Shrewsbury	1473	1538	
Earl of Essex (1461)	Henry Bourchier, 2nd Earl of Essex	1483	1540	
Earl of Kent (1465)	Richard Grey, 3rd Earl of Kent	1505	1524	Died
Earl of Kent (1465)	Henry Grey, 4th Earl of Kent	1524	1562	
Earl of Derby (1485)	Thomas Stanley, 2nd Earl of Derby	1504	1521	Died
Earl of Derby (1485)	Edward Stanley, 3rd Earl of Derby	1521	1572	
Earl of Wiltshire (1510)	Henry Stafford, 1st Earl of Wiltshire	1510	1523	Died, title extinct
Earl of Devon (1511)	Henry Courtenay, 2nd Earl of Devon	1511	1538	Created Marquess of Exeter, see above
Earl of Worcester (1514)	Charles Somerset, 1st Earl of Worcester	1514	1526	Died
Earl of Worcester (1514)	Henry Somerset, 2nd Earl of Worcester	1526	1549	
Earl of Cumberland (1525)	Henry Clifford, 1st Earl of Cumberland	1525	1542	New creation
Earl of Rutland (1525)	Thomas Manners, 1st Earl of Rutland	1525	1543	New creation
Earl of Lincoln (1525)	Henry Brandon, 1st Earl of Lincoln	1525	1534	New creation
Earl of Huntingdon (1529)	George Hastings, 1st Earl of Huntingdon	1529	1544	New creation
Earl of Wiltshire (1529)	Thomas Boleyn, 1st Earl of Wiltshire	1529	1539	New creation; Viscount Rochford in 1525
Earl of Sussex (1529)	Robert Radcliffe, 1st Earl of Sussex	1529	1542	New creation; Viscount Fitzwalter in 1525
Viscount Lisle (1523)	Arthur Plantagenet, 1st Viscount Lisle	1523	1542	New creation
Baron de Ros (1264)	Thomas Manners, 13th Baron de Ros	1513	1543	Created Earl of Rutland in 1525, see above
Baron FitzWalter (1295)	Robert Radcliffe, 10th Baron FitzWalter	1506	1542	Created Earl of Sussex in 1525, Barony held by his heirs until 1629, when it became dormant
Baron FitzWarin (1295)	John Bourchier, 11th Baron FitzWarin	1479	1539	
Baron Grey de Wilton (1295)	Richard Grey, 12th Baron Grey de Wilton	1518	1520	Died
Baron Grey de Wilton (1295)	William Grey, 13th Baron Grey de Wilton	1520	1562	
Baron Clinton (1299)	Edward Clinton, 9th Baron Clinton	1517	1585	
Baron De La Warr (1299)	Thomas West, 8th Baron De La Warr	1476	1525	Died
Baron De La Warr (1299)	Thomas West, 9th Baron De La Warr	1525	1554	
Baron Ferrers of Chartley (1299)	Walter Devereux, 10th Baron Ferrers of Chartley	1501	1558	
Baron de Clifford (1299)	Henry Clifford, 10th Baron de Clifford	1485	1523	Died
Baron de Clifford (1299)	Henry Clifford, 11th Baron de Clifford	1485	1523	Created Earl of Cumberland, see above
Baron Morley (1299)	Henry Parker, 10th Baron Morley	1518	1556	
Baron Zouche of Haryngworth (1308)	John la Zouche, 7th Baron Zouche	1468	1526	Died
Baron Zouche of Haryngworth (1308)	John la Zouche, 8th Baron Zouche	1526	1550	
Baron Audley of Heleigh (1313)	John Tuchet, 8th Baron Audley	1512	1557	
Baron Cobham of Kent (1313)	Thomas Brooke, 8th Baron Cobham	1512	1529	Died
Baron Cobham of Kent (1313)	George Brooke, 9th Baron Cobham	1529	1558	
Baron Willoughby de Eresby (1313)	William Willoughby, 11th Baron Willoughby de Eresby	1499	1526	Died
Baron Willoughby de Eresby (1313)	Catherine Willoughby, 12th Baroness Willoughby de Eresby	1526	1580	
Baron Dacre (1321)	Thomas Fiennes, 8th Baron Dacre	1486	1534	
Baron Greystock (1321)	William Dacre, 7th Baron Greystoke	1516	1563	
Baron Harington (1326)	Cecily Bonville, 7th Baroness Harington	1460	1530	
Baron Botreaux (1368)	Mary Hungerford, 5th Baroness Botreaux	1477	1529	Died
Baron Botreaux (1368)	George Hastings, 6th Baron Botreaux	1529	1544	Created Earl of Huntington, see above
Baron Scrope of Bolton (1371)	Henry Scrope, 7th Baron Scrope of Bolton	1506	1533	
Baron Lumley (1384)	John Lumley, 5th Baron Lumley	1510	1545	
Baron Bergavenny (1392)	George Nevill, 5th Baron Bergavenny	1492	1536	
Baron Berkeley (1421)	Maurice Berkeley, 4th Baron Berkeley	1506	1523	Died
Baron Berkeley (1421)	Thomas Berkeley, 5th Baron Berkeley	1523	1533	
Baron Latimer (1432)	Richard Neville, 2nd Baron Latimer	1469	1530	
Baron Dudley (1440)	Edward Sutton, 2nd Baron Dudley	1487	1532	
Baron Lisle (1444)	Elizabeth Grey, 6th Baroness Lisle	1519	1525	Died, Barony fell into abeyance
Baron Saye and Sele (1447)	Edward Fiennes, 5th Baron Saye and Sele	1501	1528	Died
Baron Saye and Sele (1447)	Richard Fiennes, 6th Baron Saye and Sele	1528	1573	
Baron Stourton (1448)	William Stourton, 5th Baron Stourton	1487	1523	Died
Baron Stourton (1448)	Edward Stourton, 6th Baron Stourton	1523	1535	
Baron Berners (1455)	John Bourchier, 2nd Baron Berners	1474	1533	
Baron Hastings de Hastings (1461)	George Hastings, 3rd Baron Hastings	1506	1544	Created Earl of Huntington in 1529, Barony held by his heirs until 1789
Baron Herbert (1461)	Henry Somerset, 4th Baron Herbert	1514	1548	Created Earl of Worcester in 1526, Barony held by his heirs until 1984, when it fell into abeyance
Baron Ogle (1461)	Robert Ogle, 4th Baron Ogle	1513	1530	
Baron Mountjoy (1465)	William Blount, 4th Baron Mountjoy	1485	1534	
Baron Dacre of Gilsland (1473)	Thomas Dacre, 2nd Baron Dacre	1485	1525	Title succeeded by the more senior Baron Greystock, and held by his heirs until 1569, when both titles fell into abeyance
Baron Grey of Powis (1482)	Edward Grey, 3rd Baron Grey of Powis	1504	1552	
Baron Daubeney (1486)	Henry Daubeney, 2nd Baron Daubeney	1507	1548	
Baron Willoughby de Broke (1491)	Robert Willoughby, 2nd Baron Willoughby de Broke	1502	1521	Died, title fell into abeyance, until 1535
Baron Conyers (1509)	William Conyers, 1st Baron Conyers	1509	1524	Died
Baron Conyers (1509)	Christopher Conyers, 2nd Baron Conyers	1524	1538	
Baron Darcy de Darcy (1509)	Thomas Darcy, 1st Baron Darcy de Darcy	1509	1538	
Baron Montagu (1514)	Henry Pole, 1st Baron Montagu	1513	1539	
Baron Monteagle (1514)	Edward Stanley, 1st Baron Monteagle	1514	1523	Died
Baron Monteagle (1514)	Thomas Stanley, 2nd Baron Monteagle	1523	1560	
Baron Marny (1523)	Henry Marney, 1st Baron Marney	1523	1523	New creation, died
Baron Marny (1523)	John Marney, 2nd Baron Marney	1523	1525	Died, title extinct
Baron Vaux of Harrowden (1523)	Nicholas Vaux, 1st Baron Vaux of Harrowden	1523	1523	New creation, died
Baron Vaux of Harrowden (1523)	Thomas Vaux, 2nd Baron Vaux of Harrowden	1523	1556	
Baron Sandys of the Vine (1529)	William Sandys, 1st Baron Sandys	1529	1540	New creation
Baron Braye (1529)	Edmund Braye, 1st Baron Braye	1529	1539	New creation
Baron Burgh (1529)	Thomas Burgh, 1st Baron Burgh	1529	1550	New creation
Baron Tailboys (1529)	Gilbert Tailboys, 1st Baron Tailboys of Kyme	1529	1530	New creation
Baron Windsor (1529)	Andrew Windsor, 1st Baron Windsor	1529	1543	New creation
Baron Hussey (1529)	John Hussey, 1st Baron Hussey of Sleaford	1529	1537	New creation
Baron Wentworth (1529)	Thomas Wentworth, 1st Baron Wentworth	1529	1551	New creation

== Peerage of Scotland ==
Title	Holder	Date gained	Date lost	Notes
Duke of Rothesay (1398)	none	1513	1540	
Duke of Albany (1456)	John Stewart, Duke of Albany	1515	1536	
Earl of Sutherland (1235)	Elizabeth de Moravia, 10th Countess of Sutherland	1514	1535	
Earl of Angus (1389)	Archibald Douglas, 6th Earl of Angus	1513	1557	
Earl of Crawford (1398)	David Lindsay, 8th Earl of Crawford	1517	1542	
Earl of Menteith (1427)	Alexander Graham, 2nd Earl of Menteith	1490	1537	
Earl of Huntly (1445)	Alexander Gordon, 3rd Earl of Huntly	1501	1524	Died
Earl of Huntly (1445)	George Gordon, 4th Earl of Huntly	1524	1562	
Earl of Erroll (1452)	William Hay, 5th Earl of Erroll	1513	1541	
Earl of Caithness (1455)	John Sinclair, 3rd Earl of Caithness	1513	1529	Died
Earl of Caithness (1455)	George Sinclair, 4th Earl of Caithness	1529	1582	
Earl of Argyll (1457)	Colin Campbell, 3rd Earl of Argyll	1513	1529	Died
Earl of Argyll (1457)	Archibald Campbell, 4th Earl of Argyll	1529	1558	
Earl of Atholl (1457)	John Stewart, 2nd Earl of Atholl	1512	1521	Died
Earl of Atholl (1457)	John Stewart, 3rd Earl of Atholl	1521	1542	
Earl of Morton (1458)	James Douglas, 3rd Earl of Morton	1513	1548	
Earl of Rothes (1458)	George Leslie, 4th Earl of Rothes	1513	1558	
Earl Marischal (1458)	William Keith, 3rd Earl Marischal	1483	1530	
Earl of Buchan (1469)	John Stewart, 3rd Earl of Buchan	1505	1551	
Earl of Glencairn (1488)	Cuthbert Cunningham, 3rd Earl of Glencairn	1490	1541	
Earl of Bothwell (1488)	Patrick Hepburn, 3rd Earl of Bothwell	1513	1556	
Earl of Lennox (1488)	John Stewart, 3rd Earl of Lennox	1513	1526	Died
Earl of Lennox (1488)	Matthew Stewart, 4th Earl of Lennox	1526	1571	
Earl of Moray (1501)	James Stewart, 1st Earl of Moray	1501	1544	
Earl of Arran (1503)	James Hamilton, 1st Earl of Arran	1503	1529	Died
Earl of Arran (1503)	James Hamilton, 2nd Earl of Arran	1529	1575	
Earl of Montrose (1503)	William Graham, 2nd Earl of Montrose	1513	1571	
Earl of Eglinton (1507)	Hugh Montgomerie, 1st Earl of Eglinton	1507	1545	
Earl of Cassilis (1509)	Gilbert Kennedy, 2nd Earl of Cassilis	1513	1527	Died
Earl of Cassilis (1509)	Gilbert Kennedy, 3rd Earl of Cassilis	1527	1558	
Lord Erskine (1429)	John Erskine, 5th Lord Erskine	1513	1552	de jure Earl of Mar
Lord Somerville (1430)	John Somerville, 4th Lord Somerville	1491	1523	Died
Lord Somerville (1430)	Hugh Somerville, 5th Lord Somerville	1523	1549	
Lord Haliburton of Dirleton (1441)	Janet Haliburton, 7th Lady Haliburton of Dirleton	1502	1560	
Lord Forbes (1442)	John Forbes, 6th Lord Forbes	1493	1547	
Lord Maxwell (1445)	Robert Maxwell, 5th Lord Maxwell	1513	1546	
Lord Glamis (1445)	John Lyon, 6th Lord Glamis	1505	1528	Died
Lord Glamis (1445)	John Lyon, 7th Lord Glamis	1528	1558	
Lord Lindsay of the Byres (1445)	Patrick Lindsay, 4th Lord Lindsay	1497	1526	Died
Lord Lindsay of the Byres (1445)	John Lindsay, 5th Lord Lindsay	1526	1563	
Lord Saltoun (1445)	Alexander Abernethy, 4th Lord Saltoun	1505	1527	Died
Lord Saltoun (1445)	William Abernethy, 5th Lord Saltoun	1527	1543	
Lord Gray (1445)	Patrick Gray, 3rd Lord Grayy	1514	1541	
Lord Sinclair (1449)	William Sinclair, 4th Lord Sinclair	1513	1570	
Lord Fleming (1451)	John Fleming, 2nd Lord Fleming	1494	1524	Died
Lord Fleming (1451)	Malcolm Fleming, 3rd Lord Fleming	1524	1547	
Lord Seton (1451)	George Seton, 6th Lord Seton	1513	1549	
Lord Borthwick (1452)	William Borthwick, 4th Lord Borthwick	1513	1542	
Lord Boyd (1454)	Robert Boyd, 4th Lord Boyd	Aft. 1508	1558	
Lord Oliphant (1455)	Laurence Oliphant, 3rd Lord Oliphant	1516	1566	
Lord Livingston (1458)	Alexander Livingston, 5th Lord Livingston	1518	1553	
Lord Cathcart (1460)	John Cathcart, 2nd Lord Cathcart	1497	1535	
Lord Lovat (1464)	Thomas Fraser, 2nd Lord Lovat	1500	1524	Died
Lord Lovat (1464)	Hugh Fraser, 3rd Lord Lovat	1524	1544	
Lord Innermeath (1470)	Richard Stewart, 3rd Lord Innermeath	1513	1532	
Lord Carlyle of Torthorwald (1473)	William Carlyle, 2nd Lord Carlyle	1501	1524	Died
Lord Carlyle of Torthorwald (1473)	James Carlyle, 3rd Lord Carlyle	1524	1526	
Lord Carlyle of Torthorwald (1473)	Michael Carlyle, 4th Lord Carlyle	1526	1575	
Lord Home (1473)	George Home, 4th Lord Home	1516	1549	
Lord Ruthven (1488)	William Ruthven, 1st Lord Ruthven	1488	1528	Died
Lord Ruthven (1488)	William Ruthven, 2nd Lord Ruthven	1528	1552	
Lord Crichton of Sanquhar (1488)	Robert Crichton, 4th Lord Crichton of Sanquhar	1516-20	1536	
Lord Drummond of Cargill (1488)	David Drummond, 2nd Lord Drummond	1519	1571	
Lord Hay of Yester (1488)	John Hay, 3rd Lord Hay of Yester	1513	1543	
Lord Sempill (1489)	William Sempill, 2nd Lord Sempill	1513	1552	
Lord Herries of Terregles (1490)	William Herries, 3rd Lord Herries of Terregles	1513	1543	
Lord Ogilvy of Airlie (1491)	James Ogilvy, 3rd Lord Ogilvy of Airlie	1506	1524	Died
Lord Ogilvy of Airlie (1491)	James Ogilvy, 4th Lord Ogilvy of Airlie	1524	1549	
Lord Ross (1499)	Ninian Ross, 3rd Lord Ross	1513	1556	
Lord Avondale (1500)	Andrew Stewart, 2nd Lord Avondale	1513	1549	
Lord Elphinstone (1509)	Alexander Elphinstone, 2nd Lord Elphinstone	1513	1547	
Lord Methven (1528)	Henry Stewart, 1st Lord Methven	1528	1552	New creation

== Peerage of Ireland ==
Title	Holder	Date gained	Date lost	Notes
Earl of Kildare (1316)	Gerald FitzGerald, 9th Earl of Kildare	1513	1534	
Earl of Ormond (1328)	Piers Butler, 8th Earl of Ormond	1515	1539	
Earl of Desmond (1329)	Maurice FitzGerald, 9th Earl of Desmond	1487	1520	Died
Earl of Desmond (1329)	James FitzGerald, 10th Earl of Desmond	1520	1529	Died
Earl of Desmond (1329)	Thomas FitzGerald, 11th Earl of Desmond	1529	1534	
Earl of Waterford (1446)	George Talbot, 4th Earl of Waterford	1473	1538	
Viscount Gormanston (1478)	William Preston, 2nd Viscount Gormanston	1503	1532	
Baron Athenry (1172)	Meiler de Bermingham	1500	1529	Died
Baron Athenry (1172)	John de Bermingham	1529	1547	
Baron Kingsale (1223)	David de Courcy, 15th Baron Kingsale	1505	1520	Died
Baron Kingsale (1223)	John de Courcy, 16th Baron Kingsale	1520	1535	
Baron Kerry (1223)	Edmond Fitzmaurice, 10th Baron Kerry	1498	1543	
Baron Barry (1261)	John Barry, 12th Baron Barry	1500	1530	
Baron Slane (1370)	James Fleming, 9th Baron Slane	1517	1578	
Baron Howth (1425)	Nicholas St Lawrence, 4th Baron Howth	1485	1526	Died
Baron Howth (1425)	Christopher St Lawrence, 5th Baron Howth	1526	1542	
Baron Killeen (1449)	John Plunkett, 5th Baron Killeen	1510	1550	
Baron Trimlestown (1461)	John Barnewall, 3rd Baron Trimlestown	1513	1538	
Baron Dunsany (1462)	Edward Plunkett, 4th Baron of Dunsany	1500	1521	Died
Baron Dunsany (1462)	Robert Plunkett, 5th Baron of Dunsany	1521	1559	
Baron Delvin (1486)	Richard Nugent, 1st Baron Delvin	1486	1537	

Preceded by List of peers 1510–1519	Lists of peers by decade 1520–1529	Succeeded by List of peers 1530–1539
