= List of peers 1530–1539 =

This page lists all peers who held extant titles between 1530 and 1539.

== Peerage of England ==
Title	Holder	Date gained	Date lost	Notes
Duke of Cornwall (1337)	none	1514	1537	
Duke of Cornwall (1337)	Edward Tudor	1537	1547	
Duke of Norfolk (1483)	Thomas Howard, 3rd Duke of Norfolk	1524	1547	
Duke of Suffolk (1514)	Charles Brandon, 1st Duke of Suffolk	1514	1545	
Duke of Richmond and Somerset (1525)	Henry FitzRoy, Duke of Richmond and Somerset	1525	1536	Died; title extinct
Marquess of Dorset (1475)	Thomas Grey, 2nd Marquess of Dorset	1501	1530	Died
Marquess of Dorset (1475)	Henry Grey, 3rd Marquess of Dorset	1530	1554	
Marquess of Exeter (1525)	Henry Courtenay, 1st Marquess of Exeter	1525	1539	Attainted, and his honours were forfeited
Marquess of Pembroke (1532)	Anne Boleyn, 1st Marchioness of Pembroke	1532	1536	New creation; attainted, and the peerage became forfeited
Earl of Arundel (1138)	William FitzAlan, 18th Earl of Arundel	1524	1544	
Earl of Oxford (1142)	John de Vere, 15th Earl of Oxford	1526	1540	
Earl of Salisbury (1337)	Margaret Pole, Countess of Salisbury	1513	1539	Attainted, and her honours were forfeited
Earl of Westmorland (1397)	Ralph Neville, 4th Earl of Westmorland	1499	1549	
Earl of Northumberland (1416)	Henry Percy, 6th Earl of Northumberland	1527	1537	Died, his honours were considered incapable of passing through an attainted person, and thus became forfeited
Earl of Shrewsbury (1442)	George Talbot, 4th Earl of Shrewsbury	1473	1538	Died
Earl of Shrewsbury (1442)	Francis Talbot, 5th Earl of Shrewsbury	1538	1560	
Earl of Essex (1461)	Henry Bourchier, 2nd Earl of Essex	1483	1540	
Earl of Kent (1465)	Henry Grey, 4th Earl of Kent	1524	1562	
Earl of Derby (1485)	Edward Stanley, 3rd Earl of Derby	1521	1572	
Earl of Worcester (1514)	Henry Somerset, 2nd Earl of Worcester	1526	1549	
Earl of Cumberland (1525)	Henry Clifford, 1st Earl of Cumberland	1525	1542	
Earl of Rutland (1525)	Thomas Manners, 1st Earl of Rutland	1525	1543	
Earl of Lincoln (1525)	Henry Brandon, 1st Earl of Lincoln	1525	1534	Died, title extinct
Earl of Huntington (1529)	George Hastings, 1st Earl of Huntingdon	1529	1544	
Earl of Wiltshire (1529)	Thomas Boleyn, 1st Earl of Wiltshire	1529	1539	Died, title extinct
Earl of Sussex (1529)	Robert Radcliffe, 1st Earl of Sussex	1529	1542	
Earl of Bath (1536)	John Bourchier, 1st Earl of Bath	1536	1539	New creation; died
Earl of Bath (1536)	John Bourchier, 2nd Earl of Bath	1539	1561	
Earl of Hertford (1537)	Edward Seymour, 1st Earl of Hertford	1537	1551	New creation; Viscount Beauchamp in 1536
Earl of Southampton (1537)	William FitzWilliam, 1st Earl of Southampton	1537	1542	New creation
Earl of Bridgewater (1538)	Henry Daubeney, 1st Earl of Bridgewater	1538	1548	New creation
Viscount Lisle (1523)	Arthur Plantagenet, 1st Viscount Lisle	1523	1542	
Baron FitzWarin (1295)	John Bourchier, 11th Baron FitzWarin	1479	1539	Created Earl of Bath in 1536, Barony held by his heirs until 1636, when it fell into abeyance
Baron Grey de Wilton (1295)	William Grey, 13th Baron Grey de Wilton	1520	1562	
Baron Clinton (1299)	Edward Clinton, 9th Baron Clinton	1517	1585	
Baron De La Warr (1299)	Thomas West, 9th Baron De La Warr	1525	1554	
Baron Ferrers of Chartley (1299)	Walter Devereux, 10th Baron Ferrers of Chartley	1501	1558	
Baron Morley (1299)	Henry Parker, 10th Baron Morley	1518	1556	
Baron Zouche of Haryngworth (1308)	John la Zouche, 8th Baron Zouche	1526	1550	
Baron Audley of Heleigh (1313)	John Tuchet, 8th Baron Audley	1512	1557	
Baron Cobham of Kent (1313)	George Brooke, 9th Baron Cobham	1529	1558	
Baron Willoughby de Eresby (1313)	Catherine Willoughby, 12th Baroness Willoughby de Eresby	1526	1580	
Baron Dacre (1321)	Thomas Fiennes, 8th Baron Dacre	1486	1534	Died
Baron Dacre (1321)	Thomas Fiennes, 9th Baron Dacre	1534	1541	
Baron Greystock (1321)	William Dacre, 7th Baron Greystoke	1516	1563	
Baron Harington (1326)	Cecily Bonville, 7th Baroness Harington	1460	1530	Title succeeded by the Marquess of Dorset, and held by his heir, until 1554, when all his titles became forfeited
Baron Scrope of Bolton (1371)	Henry Scrope, 7th Baron Scrope of Bolton	1506	1533	Died
Baron Scrope of Bolton (1371)	John Scrope, 8th Baron Scrope of Bolton	1533	1549	
Baron Lumley (1384)	John Lumley, 5th Baron Lumley	1510	1545	
Baron Bergavenny (1392)	George Nevill, 5th Baron Bergavenny	1492	1536	Died
Baron Bergavenny (1392)	Henry Nevill, 6th Baron Bergavenny	1536	1585	
Baron Berkeley (1421)	Thomas Berkeley, 5th Baron Berkeley	1523	1533	Died
Baron Berkeley (1421)	Thomas Berkeley, 6th Baron Berkeley	1533	1534	
Baron Berkeley (1421)	Henry Berkeley, 7th Baron Berkeley	1534	1613	
Baron Latimer (1432)	Richard Neville, 2nd Baron Latimer	1469	1530	Died
Baron Latimer (1432)	John Neville, 3rd Baron Latimer	1530	1543	
Baron Dudley (1440)	Edward Sutton, 2nd Baron Dudley	1487	1532	Died
Baron Dudley (1440)	John Sutton, 3rd Baron Dudley	1532	1553	
Baron Saye and Sele (1447)	Richard Fiennes, 6th Baron Saye and Sele	1528	1573	
Baron Stourton (1448)	Edward Stourton, 6th Baron Stourton	1523	1535	Died
Baron Stourton (1448)	William Stourton, 7th Baron Stourton	1535	1548	
Baron Berners (1455)	John Bourchier, 2nd Baron Berners	1474	1533	Died, Barony became dormant
Baron Ogle (1461)	Robert Ogle, 4th Baron Ogle	1513	1530	Died
Baron Ogle (1461)	Robert Ogle, 5th Baron Ogle	1530	1545	
Baron Mountjoy (1465)	William Blount, 4th Baron Mountjoy	1485	1534	Died
Baron Mountjoy (1465)	Charles Blount, 5th Baron Mountjoy	1534	1544	
Baron Grey of Powis (1482)	Edward Grey, 3rd Baron Grey of Powis	1504	1552	
Baron Daubeney (1486)	Henry Daubeney, 2nd Baron Daubeney	1507	1548	Created Earl of Bridgewater in 1538, see above
Baron Willoughby de Broke (1491)	Elizabeth Willoughby, 3rd Baroness Willoughby de Broke	1535	1562	Abeyance terminated in 1535
Baron Conyers (1509)	Christopher Conyers, 2nd Baron Conyers	1524	1538	Died
Baron Conyers (1509)	John Conyers, 3rd Baron Conyers	1538	1557	
Baron Darcy de Darcy (1509)	Thomas Darcy, 1st Baron Darcy de Darcy	1509	1538	Attainted, and his honours were forfeited
Baron Montagu (1514)	Henry Pole, 1st Baron Montagu	1513	1539	Attainted, and his honours became forfeited
Baron Monteagle (1514)	Thomas Stanley, 2nd Baron Monteagle	1523	1560	
Baron Vaux of Harrowden (1523)	Thomas Vaux, 2nd Baron Vaux of Harrowden	1523	1556	
Baron Sandys of the Vine (1529)	William Sandys, 1st Baron Sandys	1529	1540	
Baron Braye (1529)	Edmund Braye, 1st Baron Braye	1529	1539	Died
Baron Braye (1529)	John Braye, 2nd Baron Braye	1539	1557	
Baron Burgh (1529)	Thomas Burgh, 1st Baron Burgh	1529	1550	
Baron Tailboys (1529)	Gilbert Tailboys, 1st Baron Tailboys of Kyme	1529	1530	Died
Baron Tailboys (1529)	George Tailboys, 2nd Baron Tailboys of Kyme	1530	1540	
Baron Windsor (1529)	Andrew Windsor, 1st Baron Windsor	1529	1543	
Baron Hussey (1529)	John Hussey, 1st Baron Hussey of Sleaford	1529	1537	Attainted, Barony became forfeited
Baron Wentworth (1529)	Thomas Wentworth, 1st Baron Wentworth	1529	1551	
Baron Mordaunt (1532)	John Mordaunt, 1st Baron Mordaunt	1532	1562	New creation
Baron Cromwell (1536)	Thomas Cromwell, 1st Baron Cromwell	1536	1540	New creation
Baron Audley of Walden (1538)	Thomas Audley, 1st Baron Audley of Walden	1538	1244	New creation
Baron St John of Basing (1539)	William Paulet, 1st Baron St John of Basing	1539	1572	New creation
Baron Parr (1539)	William Parr, 1st Baron Parr	1539	1571	New creation

== Peerage of Scotland ==
Title	Holder	Date gained	Date lost	Notes
Duke of Rothesay (1398)	none	1513	1540	
Duke of Albany (1456)	John Stewart, Duke of Albany	1515	1536	Died, title extinct
Earl of Sutherland (1235)	Elizabeth de Moravia, 10th Countess of Sutherland	1514	1535	Died
Earl of Sutherland (1235)	John Gordon, 11th Earl of Sutherland	1535	1567	
Earl of Angus (1389)	Archibald Douglas, 6th Earl of Angus	1513	1557	
Earl of Crawford (1398)	David Lindsay, 8th Earl of Crawford	1517	1542	
Earl of Menteith (1427)	Alexander Graham, 2nd Earl of Menteith	1490	1537	Died
Earl of Menteith (1427)	William Graham, 3rd Earl of Menteith	1537	1543	
Earl of Huntly (1445)	George Gordon, 4th Earl of Huntly	1524	1562	
Earl of Erroll (1452)	William Hay, 5th Earl of Erroll	1513	1541	
Earl of Caithness (1455)	George Sinclair, 4th Earl of Caithness	1529	1582	
Earl of Argyll (1457)	Archibald Campbell, 4th Earl of Argyll	1529	1558	
Earl of Atholl (1457)	John Stewart, 3rd Earl of Atholl	1521	1542	
Earl of Morton (1458)	James Douglas, 3rd Earl of Morton	1513	1548	
Earl of Rothes (1458)	George Leslie, 4th Earl of Rothes	1513	1558	
Earl Marischal (1458)	William Keith, 3rd Earl Marischal	1483	1530	Died
Earl Marischal (1458)	William Keith, 4th Earl Marischal	1530	1581	
Earl of Buchan (1469)	John Stewart, 3rd Earl of Buchan	1505	1551	
Earl of Glencairn (1488)	Cuthbert Cunningham, 3rd Earl of Glencairn	1490	1541	
Earl of Bothwell (1488)	Patrick Hepburn, 3rd Earl of Bothwell	1513	1556	
Earl of Lennox (1488)	Matthew Stewart, 4th Earl of Lennox	1526	1571	
Earl of Moray (1501)	James Stewart, 1st Earl of Moray	1501	1544	
Earl of Arran (1503)	James Hamilton, 2nd Earl of Arran	1529	1575	
Earl of Montrose (1503)	William Graham, 2nd Earl of Montrose	1513	1571	
Earl of Eglinton (1507)	Hugh Montgomerie, 1st Earl of Eglinton	1507	1545	
Earl of Cassilis (1509)	Gilbert Kennedy, 3rd Earl of Cassilis	1527	1558	
Lord Erskine (1429)	John Erskine, 5th Lord Erskine	1513	1552	de jure Earl of Mar
Lord Somerville (1430)	Hugh Somerville, 5th Lord Somerville	1523	1549	
Lord Haliburton of Dirleton (1441)	Janet Haliburton, 7th Lady Haliburton of Dirleton	1502	1560	
Lord Forbes (1442)	John Forbes, 6th Lord Forbes	1493	1547	
Lord Maxwell (1445)	Robert Maxwell, 5th Lord Maxwell	1513	1546	
Lord Glamis (1445)	John Lyon, 7th Lord Glamis	1528	1558	
Lord Lindsay of the Byres (1445)	John Lindsay, 5th Lord Lindsay	1526	1563	
Lord Saltoun (1445)	William Abernethy, 5th Lord Saltoun	1527	1543	
Lord Gray (1445)	Patrick Gray, 3rd Lord Grayy	1514	1541	
Lord Sinclair (1449)	William Sinclair, 4th Lord Sinclair	1513	1570	
Lord Fleming (1451)	Malcolm Fleming, 3rd Lord Fleming	1524	1547	
Lord Seton (1451)	George Seton, 6th Lord Seton	1513	1549	
Lord Borthwick (1452)	William Borthwick, 4th Lord Borthwick	1513	1542	
Lord Boyd (1454)	Robert Boyd, 4th Lord Boyd	Aft. 1508	1558	
Lord Oliphant (1455)	Laurence Oliphant, 3rd Lord Oliphant	1516	1566	
Lord Livingston (1458)	Alexander Livingston, 5th Lord Livingston	1518	1553	
Lord Cathcart (1460)	John Cathcart, 2nd Lord Cathcart	1497	1535	Died
Lord Cathcart (1460)	Alan Cathcart, 3rd Lord Cathcart	1535	1547	
Lord Lovat (1464)	Hugh Fraser, 3rd Lord Lovat	1524	1544	
Lord Innermeath (1470)	Richard Stewart, 3rd Lord Innermeath	1513	1532	Died
Lord Innermeath (1470)	John Stewart, 4th Lord Innermeath	1532	1569	
Lord Carlyle of Torthorwald (1473)	Michael Carlyle, 4th Lord Carlyle	1526	1575	
Lord Home (1473)	George Home, 4th Lord Home	1516	1549	
Lord Ruthven (1488)	William Ruthven, 2nd Lord Ruthven	1528	1552	
Lord Crichton of Sanquhar (1488)	Robert Crichton, 4th Lord Crichton of Sanquhar	1516-20	1536	Died
Lord Crichton of Sanquhar (1488)	William Crichton, 5th Lord Crichton of Sanquhar	1536	1550	
Lord Drummond of Cargill (1488)	David Drummond, 2nd Lord Drummond	1519	1571	
Lord Hay of Yester (1488)	John Hay, 3rd Lord Hay of Yester	1513	1543	
Lord Sempill (1489)	William Sempill, 2nd Lord Sempill	1513	1552	
Lord Herries of Terregles (1490)	William Herries, 3rd Lord Herries of Terregles	1513	1543	
Lord Ogilvy of Airlie (1491)	James Ogilvy, 4th Lord Ogilvy of Airlie	1524	1549	
Lord Ross (1499)	Ninian Ross, 3rd Lord Ross	1513	1556	
Lord Avondale (1500)	Andrew Stewart, 2nd Lord Avondale	1513	1549	
Lord Elphinstone (1509)	Alexander Elphinstone, 2nd Lord Elphinstone	1513	1547	
Lord Methven (1528)	Henry Stewart, 1st Lord Methven	1528	1552	

== Peerage of Ireland ==
Title	Holder	Date gained	Date lost	Notes
Earl of Kildare (1316)	Gerald FitzGerald, 9th Earl of Kildare	1513	1534	Died
Earl of Kildare (1316)	Thomas FitzGerald, 10th Earl of Kildare	1534	1537	Title forfeited
Earl of Ormond (1328)	Piers Butler, 8th Earl of Ormond	1515	1539	Died
Earl of Ormond (1328)	James Butler, 9th Earl of Ormond	1539	1546	Created Viscount Thurles in 1536
Earl of Desmond (1329)	Thomas FitzGerald, 11th Earl of Desmond	1529	1534	
Earl of Desmond (1329)	James FitzGerald, de jure 12th Earl of Desmond	1534	1540	See also John FitzGerald, de facto 12th Earl of Desmond
Earl of Waterford (1446)	George Talbot, 4th Earl of Waterford	1473	1538	Died
Earl of Waterford (1446)	Francis Talbot, 5th Earl of Waterford	1538	1560	
Viscount Gormanston (1478)	William Preston, 2nd Viscount Gormanston	1503	1532	Died
Viscount Gormanston (1478)	Jenico Preston, 3rd Viscount Gormanston	1532	1569	
Viscount Grane (1536)	Leonard Grey, 1st Viscount Grane	1536	1541	New creation
Viscount Kilmaule (1537)	Edmond Fitzmaurice, 1st Viscount Kilmaule	1537	1541	New creation
Baron Athenry (1172)	John de Bermingham	1529	1547	
Baron Kingsale (1223)	John de Courcy, 16th Baron Kingsale	1520	1535	
Baron Kingsale (1223)	Gerald de Courcy, 17th Baron Kingsale	1535	1599	
Baron Kerry (1223)	Edmond Fitzmaurice, 10th Baron Kerry	1498	1535	Resigned
Baron Kerry (1223)	Edmond Fitzmaurice, 11th Baron Kerry	1535	1541	Created Viscount Kilmaule, see above
Baron Barry (1261)	John Barry, 12th Baron Barry	1500	1530	Died
Baron Barry (1261)	John Barry, 13th Baron Barry	1530	1534	Died
Baron Barry (1261)	John FitzJohn Barry, 14th Baron Barry	1534	1553	
Baron Slane (1370)	James Fleming, 9th Baron Slane	1517	1578	
Baron Howth (1425)	Christopher St Lawrence, 5th Baron Howth	1526	1542	
Baron Killeen (1449)	John Plunkett, 5th Baron Killeen	1510	1550	
Baron Trimlestown (1461)	John Barnewall, 3rd Baron Trimlestown	1513	1538	Died
Baron Trimlestown (1461)	Patrick Barnewall, 4th Baron Trimlestown	1538	1562	
Baron Dunsany (1462)	Robert Plunkett, 5th Baron of Dunsany	1521	1559	
Baron Delvin (1486)	Richard Nugent, 1st Baron Delvin	1486	1537	Died
Baron Delvin (1486)	Richard Nugent, 5th Baron Delvin	1537	1559	
Baron Kilcullen (1535)	Thomas Eustace, 1st Baron Kilcullen	1535	1549	New creation
Baron Power (1535)	Richard Power, 1st Baron Power	1535	1539	New creation; died
Baron Power (1535)	Piers Power, 2nd Baron Power	1539	1545	

Preceded by List of peers 1520–1529	Lists of peers by decade 1530–1539	Succeeded by List of peers 1540–1549
