= Kenelm Somerville, 17th Lord Somerville =

Royal Navy Admiral and hereditary peer (1787–1864)

Admiral The Right Honourable The Lord Somerville
- Born: 14 November 1787; Bath, Somerset
- Died: 19 October 1864, aged 76; Newbold Comyn
- Military career
- Allegiance: United Kingdom
- Branch: Royal Navy
- Service years: 1801–1846
- Rank: Admiral
- Commands: HMS Sourabaya; HMS Thames
- Conflicts: French Revolutionary Wars; Napoleonic Wars; Action of 25 September 1806; Invasion of Isle de France; Battle of Tamatave; Invasion of Java; War of 1812
- Awards: Naval General Service Medal with two clasps

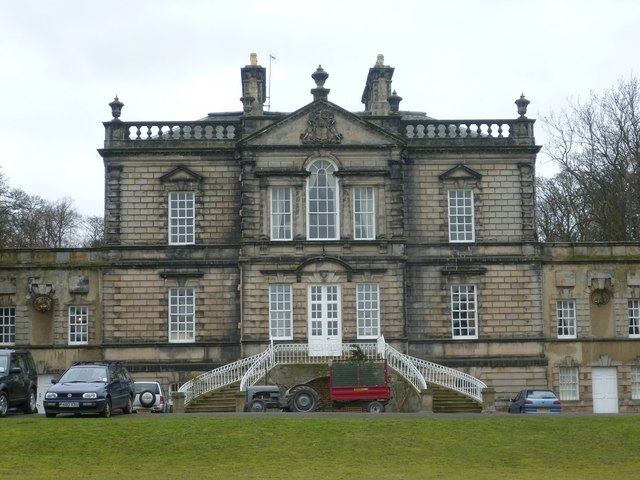
Drum House, Gilmerton, Scotland, family seat of the Lords Somerville

Admiral Kenelm Somerville, 17th Lord Somerville (14 November 1787 – 19 October 1864) was a Royal Navy officer and Scottish hereditary peer. He joined the navy in 1801 and served throughout the Napoleonic Wars, fighting at the invasion of Isle de France, Battle of Tamatave, and invasion of Java. He was promoted to commander in 1811 and in 1813 took command of the troopship HMS Thames which he sailed to North America to fight in the War of 1812. Promoted to post-captain in 1814, he commanded a flotilla in the expedition that burned Washington. Somerville retired from the navy in 1846 and continued to be promoted on the retired list, becoming an admiral in 1862. He inherited the title of Lord Somerville from his brother in 1842 and died at Newbold Comyn in 1864 at the age of 76.

== Early life ==
Kenelm Somerville was born the third son of Lieutenant-Colonel the Honourable Hugh Somerville, the son of James Somerville, 13th Lord Somerville, and Mary, the daughter of the Honourable Wriothesley Digby, at Bath on 14 November 1787. Somerville's maternal great-grandfather was William Digby, 5th Baron Digby of Sherborne Castle. He was educated at Rugby School and joined the Royal Navy in May 1801 as a volunteer on board the 74-gun ship of the line HMS Mars. The family seat was at Drum House, near Edinburgh, Scotland, as the ancestral home of the Lord Somerville peerage.

== Naval career ==
Mars was the flagship of Rear-Admiral Edward Thornbrough and in her Somerville served in the English Channel until September. At this point he transferred to the brand new 32-gun frigate HMS Narcissus, serving in her in the North and Mediterranean seas. By July 1803 Somerville had been promoted to midshipman, and in this month he participated in Narcissus's capture of the French 16-gun corvette Alcyon and then served on the blockade of Toulon. He left Narcissus in December 1804 and after spending a brief period of time on half pay he joined the 32-gun frigate HMS Medusa in February 1805. Medusa then sailed with the new Governor-General of India, Lord Cornwallis, to India. They returned on 26 January 1806, having completed a journey of 13,831 miles in 82 days. Medusa was commanded by Captain Sir John Gore who was then appointed to command the 74-gun ship of the line HMS Revenge, and when Gore transferred to that ship he took Somerville with him. Serving on the blockade of Rochefort in a squadron under the command of Commodore Sir Samuel Hood, Somerville and Revenge were present at the action of 25 September 1806 where the squadron captured four French frigates.

Somerville was promoted to lieutenant on 11 November 1807 and sent to join the 16-gun sloop HMS Falcon, in which he served until 16 November 1808 when he removed into the 44-gun frigate HMS Phoebe. In Phoebe Somerville fought at the successful invasion of Isle de France in November–December 1810. After this he took part in the Battle of Tamatave on 20 May 1811 where Phoebe and two frigates and a brig engaged three French frigates, capturing the 40-gun Renommée. On 25 May the squadron sailed to Tamatave where they secured the capture of another of the frigates they had engaged on 20 May, the 40-gun Néréide. Phoebe then sailed to take part in the invasion of Java between August and September; upon the surrender of that settlement a 14-gun ship was captured; she was commissioned as HMS Sourabaya and Somerville was promoted to acting commander and sent to command her. His rank was confirmed on 1 February 1812.

On 11 October 1813 Somerville was given command of the 32-gun frigate HMS Thames which was in service as a troopship for the War of 1812. He conveyed the 44th Regiment of Foot from Bordeaux to North America soon after. While in command of Thames Somerville was promoted to post-captain on 7 June 1814. He was subsequently given command of a flotilla of small boats in August, with which he sailed up the Patuxent River and assisted in the attack on Commodore Joshua Barney's squadron of gunboats on 22 August, and in the burning of Washington two days later. For his services while in command of his flotilla Somerville was praised by his commanding officer, Rear-Admiral George Cockburn, who in turn mentioned Somerville in his dispatches to Admiral Sir Alexander Cochrane. This was Somerville's last active service in the Royal Navy. He succeeded his elder brother Mark Somerville as Lord Somerville on 3 June 1842 and was made a retired captain on 1 October 1846.

Somerville continued to be promoted on the retired list of the navy, becoming a rear-admiral on 1 September 1846. In 1849 he received the Naval General Service Medal with two clasps. He was subsequently promoted to vice-admiral on 19 March 1857 and admiral on 20 May 1862. He died at Newbold Comyn on 19 October 1864 and was buried at Aston Somerville.

== Family ==
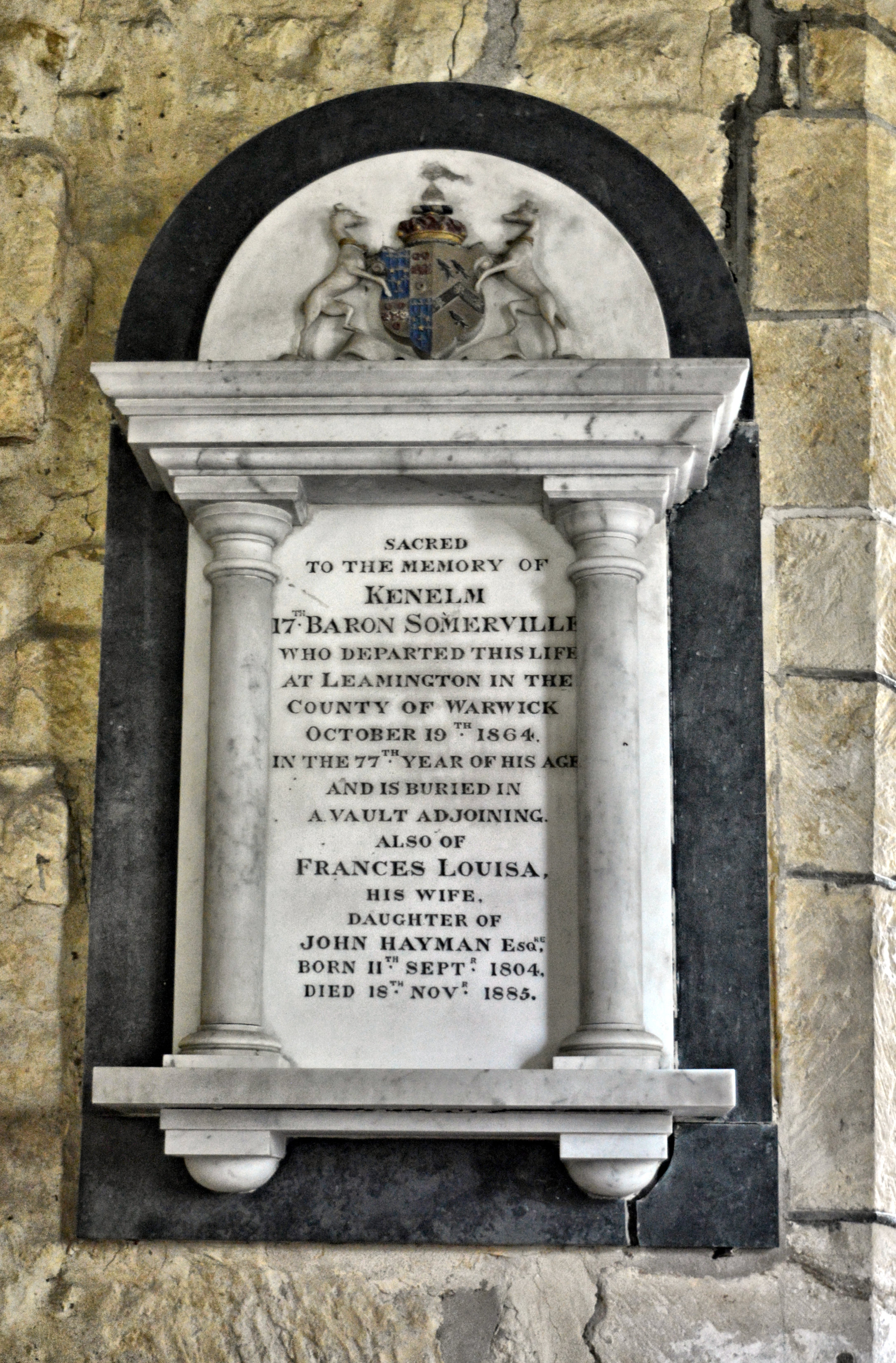
Memorial to Somerville and his wife

Somerville married Frances Louisa (d. 18 November 1885), the only daughter of John Hayman, on 3 September 1833. Together they had two sons and five daughters:

- Lieutenant Hugh Somerville, 18th Lord Somerville (11 October 1839 – 17 November 1868), Warwickshire Yeomanry officer, killed in a hunting accident
- Lieutenant Frederick Noel Somerville (8 October 1840 – 8 January 1867), Rifle Brigade officer
- Louisa Harriet Somerville (11 January 1834 – 25 February 1923), married Lieutenant-General Charles Stewart Henry CB of the Royal Horse Artillery on 21 October 1871
- Emily Charlotte Somerville (b. 29 July 1836), married the Reverend Thomas Bond Bird Robinson of Milton on 29 April 1860.
- Mary Agnes Somerville (19 December 1837 – 16 June 1889), married Sir Theophilus Biddulph, 7th Baronet, on 18 June 1872
- Selina Constance Somerville (21 November 1841 – 13 January 1910), married Captain Ralph Smyth of the 17th Regiment of Foot on 6 August 1861
- Julia Frances Somerville (24 May 1844 – 30 March 1913), married Major-General Sir Edward William Blackett, 7th Baronet CB, on 23 November 1871

== Citations ==
Peerage of Scotland
Preceded by Mark Somerville	Lord Somerville; 1842–1864	Succeeded by Hugh Somerville
