= James Somerville (disambiguation) =

Sir James Somerville (1882–1949) was a British admiral.

James Somerville may also refer to:

- James Somerville, 6th Lord Somerville (died 1569), Lord of the Parliament of Scotland
- James Somerville (family historian) (1632–1690), Scottish writer and soldier
- Sir James Somerville, 1st Baronet (1698–1748), Irish politician
- James Somerville (Bruce County politician) (1826–1898)
- James Somerville (Wentworth County, Ontario politician) (1834–1916)
- James Somerville, 2nd Baron Athlumney (1865–1929), Irish noble
- James Dugald Somerville (1868–1960), South Australian historian
- James Graham Somerville (1915–2014), conservationist
- Jimmy Somerville (born 1961), Scottish singer-songwriter
- Jimmy Somerville (footballer) (fl. 1920s), Scottish footballer with Airdrieonians

== See also ==
- James Sommerville, Canadian-born horn player
