= James Cockburn of Skirling =

Scottish landowner

James Cockburn of Skirling was a Scottish landowner, captain of Edinburgh Castle, and supporter of Mary, Queen of Scots. His castle at Skirling was demolished by Regent Moray.

== Career ==
He was a son of William Cockburn of Skirling and Marion Somerville, perhaps a daughter of Lord Somerville. William Cockburn was involved in gold mining at Crawford Muir in the time of Regent Albany. James Cockburn became laird of Skirling when his older brother William Cockburn died in 1551. The estate included lands at Letham and a fulling mill near Haddington. James Cockburn leased some lands from the nuns at Haddington.

When Mary, Queen of Scots anticipated travelling to York to meet Elizabeth I in July 1562, a number of lairds including James Cockburn of Skirling were invited to convene in Edinburgh to form her escort. After stayed at Cowthally Castle, Mary visited Skirling while on progress on 26 August 1563. James Cockburn and his brother-in-law Lord Herries were cautioners for the Earl of Huntly from 3 August 1565 to 17 April 1566.

James Cockburn seems to have been an adherent of the Earl of Bothwell, and signed a document concerning Bothwell's property transactions on 26 October 1566 during Mary's visit to Jedburgh. James Balfour, who succeeded Skirling as keeper of Edinburgh Castle, also signed the document, an undertaking that Bothwell would buy the mills of Melrose from Alexander Balfour of Denmylne.

=== Edinburgh Castle ===
James Cockburn first appears in public affairs when he was appointed Captain of Edinburgh Castle in March and April 1567. French Paris said that Queen Mary asked him to deliver a coffer of her jewels to the laird of Skirling at Edinburgh Castle.

Cockburn was a witness to some of the papers in the divorce of Bothwell and Lady Jean Gordon and one of his associates Thomas Craigwalls gave evidence. The elder Craigwalls had served as Bothwell's porter and worked in Edinburgh Castle at the time of the divorce, and the younger Thomas Craigwalls was also a servant of Bothwell.

According to the Diurnal of Occurrents, the cannon of Edinburgh Castle saluted Mary and Bothwell on their return from Dunbar Castle on 6 May and Skirling gave the castle keys to his successor James Balfour on 8 May. He signed an acknowledgement that he had received the keys from the commissioners of the Earl of Mar as "Scairling, knycht". On 12 May, when Bothwell was made Duke of Orkney and Shetland, Skirling's cousin James Cockburn of Langtoun was knighted.

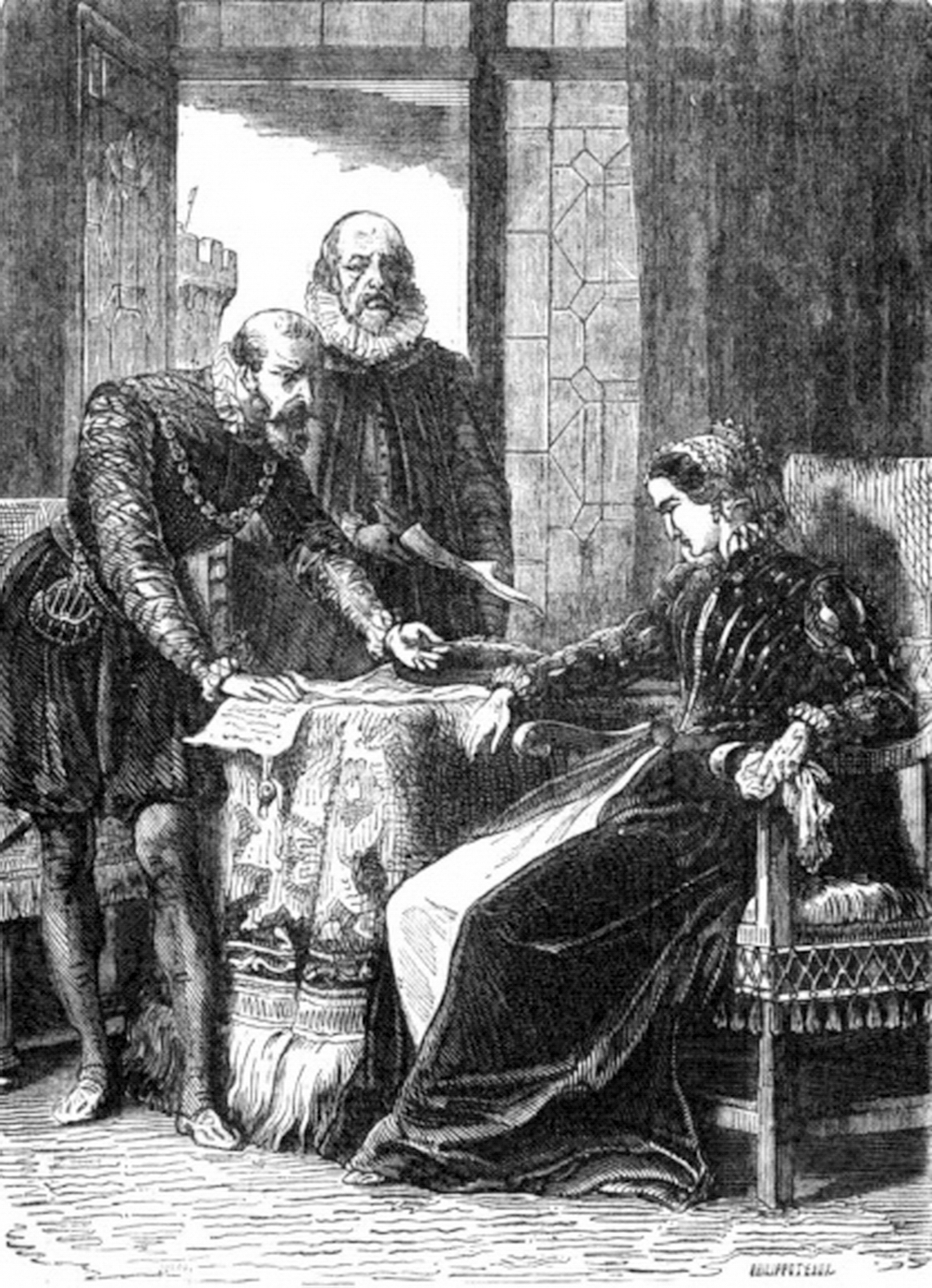
Mary, Queen of Scots signs abdication papers at Lochleven Castle

=== Comptroller ===
Cockburn signed his name as "Skirling, knight" or "Skirling, comptroller" after a financial office briefly held for Queen Mary. According to the Diurnal he was proclaimed comptroller at the cross of Edinburgh on 9 June 1567, displacing William Murray of Tullibardine. He received £350 Scots as comptroller from the treasurer in June for the receipts from church feus.

After the battle of Carberry Hill, on 7 July 1567 the Privy Council ordered that crown income including the thirds of benefices used to fund the royal household should not be paid to Cockburn, as he was a suspect in the murder of Lord Darnley and had been appointed only while Mary was in her "schameful thraldome in the Earl of Bothwell's company".

=== Trial ===
James Cockburn, Patrick Hepburn of Riccarton, and William Edmeston (a son of the parson of Fala) appeared in person in court at Edinburgh's tolbooth on 22 August 1567 to be charged with "art and part" in the murder of Lord Darnley, but the case was dismissed or continued to a later date. The English diplomat Nicholas Throckmorton wrote that Skirling and Riccarton came to the hearing "well attended" with followers. The records of Edinburgh burgh council mention that three drummers played on the High Street during the trial.

=== Mary in exile ===
Cockburn was a signatory to a band in support of Queen Mary made on 29 June 1567 at Dumbarton Castle, and another on 8 May 1568. According to Robert Lindsay of Pitscottie, he fought at the battle of Langside. James Cockburn accompanied Queen Mary to England in May 1568 and was included in a list of her attendants at Carlisle Castle. Skirling and Lord Claude Hamilton and others were lodged outside the castle. They visited Mary in the castle outwith meal times.

Regent Moray's diplomat Nicolas Elphinstone, who had recently sold Mary's pearls to Elizabeth I, came to Carlisle on 1 June. Skirling complained about his presence as a traitor to Mary and hinted at violence and possible clashes in the town. Mary sent Cockburn to Scotland on 13 July, and he returned to her at Bolton on 6 August. Mary mentioned the return of "lerd Squerlin" in a letter to Elizabeth I.

=== Skirling castle demolished ===
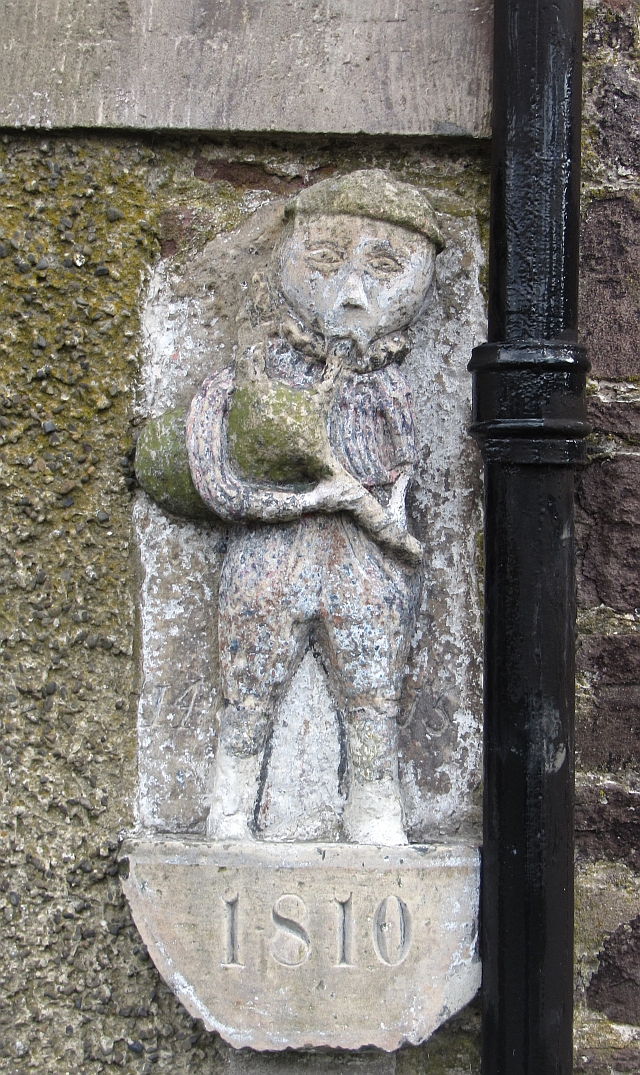
Carving of a piper said to have come from Skirling castle

Regent Moray and Lord Home demolished the Place of Skirling on 12 June 1568, who brought 2,000 men, with artillery and gunpowder from Edinburgh Castle. The laird of Skirling was "at the horn", effectively barred from credit and commerce. Moray confiscated wool belonging to Cockburn in July, selling it for £56 Scots, and the Earl of Morton took Cockburn's cattle from his brother's house in August.

A declaration composed in Mary's name in 1568 mentions that Skirling and Kenmure had been "blawin up". The destruction of the castle is mentioned in a contemporary political poem, Tom Truth's Rhime in Defence of the Queen of Scots. The site at Skirling includes a low mound with a former moat and has been excavated by archaeologists, finds including a woman's leather shoe with pinking and slashing suggest occupation in the 15th- and 16th-centuries. A stone carving of a piper set on a nearby house is said to have come from the castle.

=== Conference at York ===
In September 1568, James Cockburn attended the conference at York as one of Mary's commissioners, where Regent Moray produced the Casket letters. He signed a statement made by his brother-in-law Lord Herries, a narrative of recent events, known as the "Book of Complaints". On 16 October he signed as "Scarling, knycht" a reply made by Mary's commissioners which stated that she had resigned the crown of Scotland after taking the advice of the Earl of Atholl, William Murray of Tullibardine, and William Maitland of Lethington, who had sent Robert Melville to her at Lochleven with a ring and tokens to persuade her to sign to avoid her "present death" and without prejudice "in na sort" to her future rights. Lord Lindsay, according to the commissioners, brought the papers to Mary which she signed "with many tears, never looking what was in the writings". Skirling returned to Bolton from York.

In November he may have attended meetings at Westminster. Mary sent him from Bolton to Scotland in December 1568 with "three of her tallest servants", according to Francis Knollys he was sent to stir up trouble against Moray and strengthen Dumbarton Castle while Moray was in England. After Moray's assassination, Skirling attended a meeting of Mary's supporters in Glasgow.

== Marriage and family ==
In April 1552, James Cockburn married Jonet, Jane, or Jeanne Hereis, a daughter of William Herries, 3rd Lord Herries of Terregles. Regent Arran contributed to the dowry or "tochar", and gave her black velvet for a long-tailed gown with two bodices and two pairs of sleeves, a purple velvet gown, three satin skirts, a velvet hat, and partlets and hoods. She was given a gold chain and a garnishing to wear on her French hood. The clothes were made by the tailor John Anderson.

Cockburn's brother-in-law, Lord Herries organised Queen Mary's journey to England in 1568. In 1586, James Cockburn made over some of his lands to his son William and his wife Helen Carmichael. In 1592, after the death of James Cockburn, the lands of Skirling were recognised as a free barony for his son William. A daughter, Agnes Cockburn married James Hamilton of Libberton (Lanarkshire) and secondly John Keith of Ravenscraig. "Dame Jeane Hereis, Lady Skirling" died in Edinburgh's Canongate in December 1612.
