= John Somerville =

John Somerville may refer to:

- John Somerville (sculptor) (born 1951)
- John Somerville (Australian footballer) (1939–1984), Australian rules footballer
- John Somerville (conspirator) (1560–1583), plotted against Elizabeth I of England
- John Somerville, 3rd Lord Somerville (died 1491)
- John Somerville, 4th Lord Somerville (died 1523)
- John Somerville (Scottish footballer), Scottish footballer and manager
- John Somerville (bowls) (1926–1987), New Zealand lawn bowls player
- John Somerville (philosopher) (born 1905), recipient of the Gandhi Peace Award
- John Somerville (minister) (1774-1839) inventor of the safety catch
