= James Somerville, 6th Lord Somerville =

Scottish nobleman (c.1518–1569)

James Somerville, 6th Lord Somerville, (c.1518–1569) was a Lord of the Parliament of Scotland

James was the son of Hugh Somerville, 5th Lord Somerville and Jonet Maitland.

== James and Mary of Guise ==
James Somerville wrote to Queen Regent of Scotland, Mary of Guise, from Cowthally Castle on 22 March 1554. He asked to be excused from a tax owed by his father from 1549. On 27 April 1560 he signed the bond of the Scottish nobility to promote the Scottish Reformation, expel French troops supporting Mary of Guise, and to join with the English army sent for that purpose. On 10 May 1560, he signed the ratification of the Treaty of Berwick, by which the Lords of the Congregation invited the English army that was besieging Leith.

== Supporter of the captive Queen ==
With other Lords, Somerville signed three letters in support of the release of Mary, Queen of Scots from England. On 28 July 1568, they wrote from Largs to Elizabeth I of England. The Lords asked Elizabeth not to let them have to take their cause to the other Princes of Europe. Another letter on 30 July 1568 appealed to the Duke of Alba to get Spanish support for the release of Mary. With no reply from Elizabeth, on 24 August Somerville signed another letter at Dumbarton Castle. As Elizabeth had persuaded Mary to instruct them not to prevent Regent Moray's parliament by force, and they had thereby lost their advantage, the Lords now asked for Mary's re-instatement or release to France or Scotland.

== Marriages and family ==
James was first married in 1529 to Jean Hamilton, an illegitimate daughter of James Hamilton, 1st Earl of Arran. The Earl of Arran gave her a dowry of £886-13s-4d in his will.

His second wife was Agnes Hamilton, daughter of Sir James Hamilton of Finnart, they married at Craignethan Castle in 1536. Their children included:

- Hugh Somerville, 7th Lord Somerville
- James Somerville

== Death ==
James was present at the Battle of Langside in 1568 (supporting Queen Mary) and received a serious wound from which he never recovered. He died in 1569 at Couthalley Castle, Carnwath.

Peerage of Scotland
Preceded by Hugh Somerville	Lord Somerville; 1549–1569	Succeeded by Hugh Somerville
