= John Somerville, 4th Lord Somerville =

John Somerville, 4th Lord Somerville, (c.1484-1513), was a Lord of the Parliament of Scotland.

He was the eldest son of William Somerville, Master of Somerville, the son of John Somerville, 3rd Lord Somerville, and Marjory Montgomerie, daughter of Alexander Montgomerie, 2nd Lord Montgomerie and sister of Hugh Montgomerie, 1st Earl of Eglinton.

According to the 17th-century family history written by James, 11th Lord Somerville, this Lord John was an ineffectual character, and his affairs were managed by his relations as tutors and curators. The historian only found one charter signed by John at Edinburgh in 1510 connected with his coming-of-age, and assumes the Lord spent most of his life at Cowthally Castle near Carnwath. There is no record of John attending Parliament.

He was succeeded as Lord Somerville by his brother Hugh Somerville.

Grant states he was killed at Flodden in 1513 alongside other Scottish nobles.

== Sources ==
- Archbold, William Arthur Jobson (1898). "Somerville, Hugh". In Lee, Sidney (ed.). Dictionary of National Biography. Vol. 53. London: Smith, Elder & Co. pp. 250, 251.
- Scott, Walter, ed., James Somerville, author, The Memorie of the Somervilles by James, 11th Lord Somerville, vol. 1, Ballantyne, Edinburgh (1815)
- Scott, Walter, ed., The Memorie of the Somervilles by James, 11th Lord Somerville, vol. 2, Ballantyne, Edinburgh (1815)

Peerage of Scotland
Preceded by John Somerville	Lord Somerville; 1491–1523	Succeeded by Hugh Somerville
