= Thomas Somerville, 1st Lord Somerville =

Scottish judge and peer (died 1434)

Thomas Somerville, 1st Lord Somerville, (d. 1434), was a Lord of the Parliament of Scotland.

In 1423 Thomas Somerville, as Lord of Carnwath, came to London as an ambassador to treat for the release of James I of Scotland, who had been captive in England for many years. Somerville was also recorded as a Warden of the Scottish Borders in 1424. As Somerville of that Ilk, he sat on the assize at Stirling Castle in May 1425 that condemned Murdoch Stewart, Duke of Albany. Thomas Somerville probably founded the Collegiate Church at Carnwath with his family burial aisle around 1425–1430, and repaired the church at Linton, Roxburghshire.

== Lands ==
According to James, 11th Lord Somerville, author of the history of the Somerville family, it was during the life of Thomas, 1st Lord Somerville, that "the fortunes of the Somerville family . . . reached their zenith in territorial possessions in power and influence." He had four baronies: Carnwath in Lanarkshire and Cambusnethan in North Lanarkshire; Linton in Roxburgh; and Plean in Stirlingshire. In addition, upon the death of his uncle, Thomas Somerville, in 1412, he succeeded to the estates of Gilmerton, Drum, and Goodtrees in the Edinburgh vicinity. He also held lands in Quothquan and Newbigging in Lanarkshire; and Broughton in Peeblesshire. Cambusnethan was brought to him by his wife, Janet, daughter of Alexander Stewart of Darnley (d.1404).

== Family ==
Thomas Somerville, 1st Lord Somerville, married Janet Stewart, daughter of Alexander Stewart of Darnley, before July 1392. Their eldest daughter Mary married Sir William Hay of Yester, another daughter Geillis married Sir Robert Logan of Restalrig, and Margaret married Roger Kirkpatrick of Closeburn in Niddsdale. His heir William Somerville, 2nd Lord Somerville, married Janet Mowat of Stenness. The first Lord Somerville died in December 1434.

== Sources ==
- Scott, Walter, ed., James Somerville, The Memorie of the Somervilles by James, 11th Lord Somerville, vol. 1, Ballantyne, Edinburgh (1815)
- Scott, Walter, ed., The Memorie of the Somervilles by James, 11th Lord Somerville, vol. 2, Ballantyne, Edinburgh (1815)

Peerage of Scotland
New creation	Lord Somerville; 1430–1434	Succeeded by William Somerville
