= Margaret Hartsyde =

Scottish servant and landowner, accused of a jewel theft

Margaret Hartsyde or Hairtsyde (died 1642) was a Scottish servant and landowner accused of a theft of jewels. As a servant of the queen, Anne of Denmark, Hartsyde's duties included looking after the royal jewels, dealing with the goldsmith George Heriot, and handling large sums of money.

== Servant of a queen ==
Margaret Hartsyde was a daughter of Malcolm Hartsyde of Kirkwall, Orkney. She is first recorded as one of the serving women in Anne of Denmark's chamber in 1601. She came with the queen to England at the Union of the Crowns in 1603. When the court moved to Winchester in September 1603, to avoid plague in London, Anne of Denmark ordered fabrics for new clothes for Hartsyde and other women who had made the journey from Scotland, including Anne Livingstone, Margaret Stewart, and Jean Drummond.

In 1603, the French ambassador, the Marquis de Rosny, gave Anne of Denmark a mirror of Venice crystal in a gold box set with diamonds, and a gold table clock with diamonds to Lucy Russell, Countess of Bedford, and a gold box with the French king's portrait to Lady Rich. Rosny also gave a diamond ring to "Margaret Aisan, a favourite lady of the queen's bedchamber". This may have been Margaret Hartsyde. The ambassador had recognised her importance although she lacked the aristocratic status of the other women. The nuance of a gift to such a minor courtier as "Margaret Aisan" was noted by older historians, including Nathaniel Wraxall.

In December 1603 Arbella Stuart discussed with Mary Talbot, Countess of Shrewsbury the delicate issue of buying New Year's Day gifts for Anne of Denmark. Stuart recommended asking Hartsyde because she was discreet, and would let her "understand the Queenes minde with out knowing who asked it". The role of chamberers and chamber women in giving valuable advice to gift-givers can be seen in records of the court of Elizabeth I, and conferred prestige and power.

Anne's Scottish secretary William Fowler complained to Sir Robert Cecil about "Margaret", one of the queen's servants, meaning Margaret Hartsyde. Fowler was clearly jealous of her position and claimed that paperwork sent for Anne to sign was delayed by her women, and "Margaret" had too much authority, and was able to prompt the queen to act for others and "importune procurers".

One of her letters to Sir William Livingstone of Kilsyth described how Anne of Denmark was surprised by his leaving the court, and had expected him to deliver a jewel to her which he ought to send to queen as soon as possible. She was hoping to buy a house in Libberton in Lanarkshire with her husband.

The Privy Council suggested economies in the royal households by reducing the amount of food allowed in October 1605. Food allowances were assigned to individual members of the household in "messes" and "dishes". The allowance for one aristocratic courtier, Jean Drummond was a "diet of 7 dishes" and this might be reduced to the "chamber mess of two" which other ladies at court received. Evidently Drummond enjoyed special favour and had a number of servants and followers. Margaret Hartsyde's allowance, though not as generous as Drummond's, was also proposed to be reduced, from "4 dishes of meat".

Hartsyde handled large sums of money, and in 1606 paid the goldsmith George Heriot £500 towards the queen's bill for jewels. In 1607 Heriot gave Hartsyde a ring worth £30 for the queen, and wrote in his account that she had told him the purchase was "by her Majesty's direction", evidence that Hartsyde was trusted with the queen's business.

== Marriage ==
Hartsyde married one of King James's servants, John Buchanan, a sergeant of the king's buttery, before 11 August 1603, when they were given a joint pension of 100 marks annually. John Buchanan was a son of Robert Buchanan of Leny near Callander.

== Acquisition of lands and property ==
In September 1604, Dudley Fortescue of Chilton in Suffolk hanged himself at Blunt's Hall in Little Wratting. As a suicide, his property and goods were forfeited to the crown. King James awarded his goods to Margaret Hartsyde, and the Privy Council wrote to Sir Nicholas Bacon to make sure she got full benefit. Hartsyde received a cash gift from Robert Sidney, the queen's chamberlain. His steward noted her name as "Mrs Hartshead".

Margaret Hartsyde and her husband acquired lands in Scotland, possibly exciting jealousy by their rise in status. This included a plot of land close to the back gate of Holyrood Palace, which they obtained from the royal carpenter and architect John Murray in April 1606. On 12 June 1606 Anne of Denmark gave them a charter for the Mains of Edmonston near Niddrie and Cauldcotts, lands in the Musselburgh portion of her Dunfermline Abbey estate. John Buchanan was made a burgess of Edinburgh in August 1606 and the town gave him a gold angel coin for spices and wine for a celebratory banquet.

== Arrest and scandal ==
Margaret Hartsyde stole jewels and peals from Anne in London and attempted to sell them back to George Heriot. The French ambassador Antoine Lefèvre de la Boderie gave an account of the story in a letter of 30 October 1607. He said that Margaret Hartsyde had obtained permission to leave court and visit her friends in Scotland. As soon as she left, she was accused of making speeches against the King and Queen. King James was outraged. She was arrested in Scotland and was found to have 30,000 Écu in silver or jewels. Boderie heard she would be executed. He heard that Anne of Denmark regretted Hartsyde's involvement with her brother, Ulrik of Denmark (1578–1624), during his last visit to England. He thought there was a wider "aromatic" scandal.

== Trial and sentencing ==
Margaret Hartsyde was sent for trial in Edinburgh and convicted of "unlawful subracting and detening" in June 1608, even though she had signed a confession. It was alleged she had concealed stolen jewels by adding them to the costumes of the royal children's dolls, in the phrase of the time, "to busk babeis".

She was not sentenced to death but banishment to Orkney was proposed. John Buchanan was found not guilty. King James and Anne of Denmark were displeased by this verdict. The king's advocate Thomas Hamilton and the Privy Council wrote to King James on 24 June saying that Hartsyde had the best lawyers in Edinburgh on her side, including Thomas Hope, and that in clearing her of a charge of "theft", the assize had "very far mistaken their duty." He recommended the king order her "to be declared infamous in all time coming" as "a restraint and terror to all other servants".

Anne of Denmark had hoped Hartsyde would be convicted and condemned by the laws of Scotland and wrote to Lord Balmerino expressing her disappointment. The jewels, it was claimed, had been a gift from the queen. It was rumoured that Margaret had been indiscreet with the queen's secrets, revealing what a "wise chambermaid" would not have done. King James wrote to lawyers in Edinburgh querying their judgement, calling them "pettyfoggeris", and ordered the Privy Council to interview anyone who had set their hands to the case.

The Privy Council replied to King James on 18 August 1608. They did not then have a statement from the lawyers at the trial and so could not begin a formal process or challenge against them. A second hearing in Linlithgow pronounced Hartsyde guilty of an "infamous" crime against the royal persons, and she was imprisoned in Blackness Castle.

=== Appeals and intercession for John Buchanan ===
John Buchanan appealed to the Privy Council in February 1609 to be released from the "bounds of his confining" as he was innocent of the fact of his wife's conviction. King James responded to the council claiming he had no interest in the case, which was in their hands, and they ought to examine the case further "to discover his guiltiness". The council apologised and explained that Hartsyde had given her oath that Buchanan was unaware of her embezzlement of the queen's jewels and money received. As her crime had no witness, it was hard to incriminate Buchanan, and so the King's Advocate Thomas Hamilton had not proceeded against him. Considering the likely collusion of man and wife, both had been imprisoned. The council now thought Buchanan should be freed, at least within the environs of Edinburgh (but not to go "southwards" to London where, if secretly guilty, he might confer with accomplices about the jewels), unless the King had other considerations. They felt Buchanan was confined at the King's direction. The council wrote another letter that day, 23 February, to Anne of Denmark, asking her to intercede with King James for the release or enlargement of Buchanan, despite his wife's "damnable ingratitude and heinous offence". The people of Edinburgh had some sympathy for his predicament, imprisoned without hope of trial, which would usually merit release in Scotland. They wished that she would consult with James, and Buchanan would be allowed to come to Edinburgh (he was now in Orkney) and conduct his lawful affairs.

King James replied on 27 April 1609, again noting the business was not of great significance to him. He felt the presumption of Buchanan's involvement and guilt must be strong. Buchanan already enjoyed enough liberty with the run of Orkney. However, James was informed that Buchanan owed a Mr John Dalzell a large sum of money, and so Buchanan could be allowed to come to Edinburgh to pay Dalzell (but not go three more miles south). He remained convinced that Buchanan's guilt would be revealed. The Privy Council asked Dalzell to list Buchanan's debts. There were expenses for the children of Hartsyde's brother and sister who were lodged in Dunfermline. Henry Wardlaw of Pitreavie had advanced £200 Sterling in recompense for the missing jewels.

The lands of the Mains of Edmonston and Cauldcotts near Edinburgh, previously granted to Hartsyde, were acquired in 1613 by John Hope and his son Sir Thomas Hope.

== Exile in Orkney ==
Hartsyde and Buchanan went to Orkney and paid £400 sterling for the value of the jewels. They bought at least two properties in Kirkwall, in Mid-town and on the High Street or King's Street, and a farm on Shapinsay. In March 1618 the King, by Anne of Denmark's intercession, gave John Buchanan freedom to travel in Scotland, and freedom to travel anywhere in the kingdom was granted to Margaret and John on 15 March 1619. Eventually in October 1619, James declared Margaret Hartsyde innocent, saying she had been "by the sinisterous information of certain of her unfrendis for the tyme, pursued criminallie". The legal process against her was held to be deleted and the Justice Clerk would not issue extracts of it.

== Orkney and Fife ==
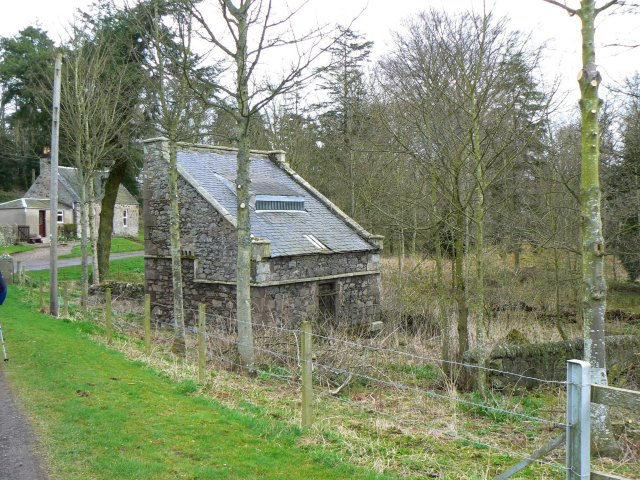
Dovecote at Scotscraig, near Tayport

Margaret Hartsyde married John Buchanan, a royal servant and the third son of Robert Buchanan of Leny. John Buchanan was made Chamberlain of Orkney and Shetland in May 1622, and was keeper of Birsay Palace, Newhouse on Orkney, Scalloway Castle, and the house at Sumburgh Ness in Shetland. There were two competitors for this office, Robert Monteith and Sir Robert Maxwell. Buchanan presided on the trials at Kirkwall of Marable Couper of the Northside of Birsay and Annie Taylor for witchcraft in 1624. Buchanan and Hartsyde bought properties in Orkney, including Elvick, the How, and Shapinsay mill, Harroldsgarth, and Sound.

Margaret Hartsyde and John Buchanan acquired the lands of Scotscraig in Fife in 1622 from George Ramsay of Dalhousie. By 1624, Buchanan became "Sir John Buchanan of Scotscraig". Scotscraig was near Tayport, Fife. John Lauder, Lord Fountainhall saw their initials "SJB" and "DMH" for Dame Margaret Hartsyde, carved on the windows of the house at Scotscraig in 1671.

== Family ==
Their children included:

- Possibly, John Buchanan, baptised at St Martin-in-the-Fields, 3 April 1608.
- Margaret Buchanan (died 1657), who in 1628 married Arthur Erskine (d. 1651), a son of Marie Stewart, Countess of Mar.
- Catherine Buchanan, who married William Forbes younger of Rires. He was a descendant of Margaret Beaton, a lady in waiting to Mary, Queen of Scots.

Margaret Hartsyde died in June 1642. A royal charter of April 1643 mentions that Margaret Hartsyde and John Buchanan had died in the years after 1635. Their son-in-law Arthur Erskine inherited Scotscraig.

A family burial aisle was built at Ferryport-on-Craig church in 1644 by her son-in-law Arthur Erskine. The church was demolished, and the aisle's carved lintel was built into the new church.
