= William Somerville, 2nd Lord Somerville =

William Somerville, 2nd Lord Somerville (died 20 August 1456) was a member of the Scottish Parliament in the mid-15th century. He is the first person to have clearly held the title Lord Somerville, having been created such in 1445, although other sources suggest that his father was the first Lord.

William Somerville was the son of Sir Thomas Somerville and his wife Janet Stewart. William Somerville married Janet Mowat. Their eldest daughter Marie married Ralph Weir, and another daughter Janet married James Cleilland of Cleilland. A younger son, William Somerville, married Margaret Hamilton of Preston and founded the Somerville of Plane family near Stirling. William's older son and heir, John Somerville, 3rd Lord Somerville, married Helen Hepburn, daughter of Sir Adam Hepburn by Janet Borthwick, then secondly married Mariotta Baille. William died on 20 August 1456 of a surfeit of fruit.

In March 1478 his widow Janet, Lady Craigmillar sued John, Lord Somerville, for goods and silverware which belonged to her by right of terce.

== Sources ==
- G. E. C., ed. Geoffrey F. White. The Complete Peerage. (London: St. Chaterine Press, 1953) Vol. XII, Part 1, p. 32.

Peerage of Scotland
Preceded by Thomas Somerville	Lord Somerville; 1445–1456	Succeeded by John Somerville
