= James Livingstone, 1st Viscount Kilsyth =

Scottish Royalist

James Livingstone, 1st Viscount Kilsyth (25 June 1616 – 7 September 1661), was a devoted Scottish Royalist who was raised to the peerage of Scotland as Viscount Kilsyth and Lord Campsie in 1661.

== Biography ==
James Livingstone, born on 25 June 1616, was younger son of Sir William Livingstone of Kilsyth, a Lord of Session, by his second wife, Margaret, daughter of Sir John Houston of Houston. On 23 April he was served heir male of his brother's grandson. Being a devoted loyalist he garrisoned Kilsyth Castle against Oliver Cromwell, for which and for other services he received from Charles II a letter of thanks dated 7 October 1650. He was excepted from Cromwell's Act of Grace in 1654, and fined £1,500.

After the Restoration he entered the Parliament of Scotland in 1661 as a shire commissioner for Stirlingshire. On 17 August 1661 raised to the peerage of Scotland by the title of Viscount Kilsyth and Lord Campsie but died the following 7 September in London.

== Family ==
James Livingstone married Eupheme, daughter of Sir Robert Cunningham of Robertland. They had two sons, James, 2nd viscount, and William, 3rd and last viscount, who having engaged in the rebellion of 1715 was attainted for high treason, and died an exile in Holland in 1733. Of his two daughters, Elizabeth married General Robert Montgomery, fifth son of Alexander, 6th Earl of Eglinton, and Anne died unmarried.
