= William Livingstone of Kilsyth =

Scottish landowner and courtier

Sir William Livingstone of Kilsyth (died 1627) was a Scottish landowner and courtier.

== Family background ==
He was a son of William Livingstone of Kilsyth, a Master of Household to King James VI, and Christian Graham, a daughter of William Graham, 3rd Earl of Menteith and Margaret Mowbray of Barnbougle, widow of John Cornwall of Bonhard. This branch of the Livingstone family had long been landowners in Kilsyth, then also known as "Monyabroch".

== Career ==
In 1605 the church minister John Welsh of Ayr wrote to him from his prison cell in Blackness Castle, assuring him that the wrath of God would fall on Archbishop Spottiswood and his family.

He kept in touch with the court of King James in London and was a correspondent of Ludovic Stewart, 2nd Duke of Lennox and Margaret Hartsyde, a Scottish servant of Anne of Denmark, the chamberer who looked after the queen's jewels. He was an agent for the duke's business in Scotland.

The Duke of Lennox was thought to be a conduit for patronage and court appointments, and those hoping to find their friends and allies positions at court would solicit his favour. However, Lennox claimed that placing more Scottish people in the king's household was increasingly difficult. He wrote to Livingstone, who had asked him to find a place for a Napier of Merchiston Castle in the king's Privy Chamber:

"although the King has this long time promised Merchiston ever the next vacant place, yet many hes bein placed over him and in this hes found gret impediments; for belive that ane stranger shall finde graet difficulty to obteane any suche place so long as ther is any Inglishe man that does aim at it; for it is thought by them all that ther is alreddy too many Scots heire in such places."

Margaret Hartsyde's letter to Livingstone describes how she was surprised by his leaving the court. Anna of Denmark had expected him to deliver a jewel to her. Hartsyde had told that queen that Livingstone had been waiting for an opportunity to give her the jewel in person. He should now send it to queen as soon as possible. Hartsyde was hoping to buy a house in Libberton in Lanarkshire with her husband John Buchanan.

Margaret Fleming, Lady Torwood, aunt of his eldest son's bride, wrote to him in 1609. Hugh, Lord Campbell of Loudon, brother of Lennox's deceased second wife Jean Campbell, wrote to Livingstone in 1610 about the Lennox lands of Inchinnan, and silver that had belonged to his sister. Lennox wrote that he was glad Livingstone was coming to court in 1622.

He died in 1627.

== Marriages and family ==
His first wife was Antoinette de Bord. Their children included William Livingstone of Darnchester (d. 1614), who married his cousin Anna Fleming, a daughter of John Fleming, 1st Earl of Wigtown and Lilias Graham.

Livingstone married secondly Margaret Houston, their children included James Livingstone, 1st Viscount Kilsyth.
