= John Southey Somerville, 15th Lord Somerville =

British agriculturist

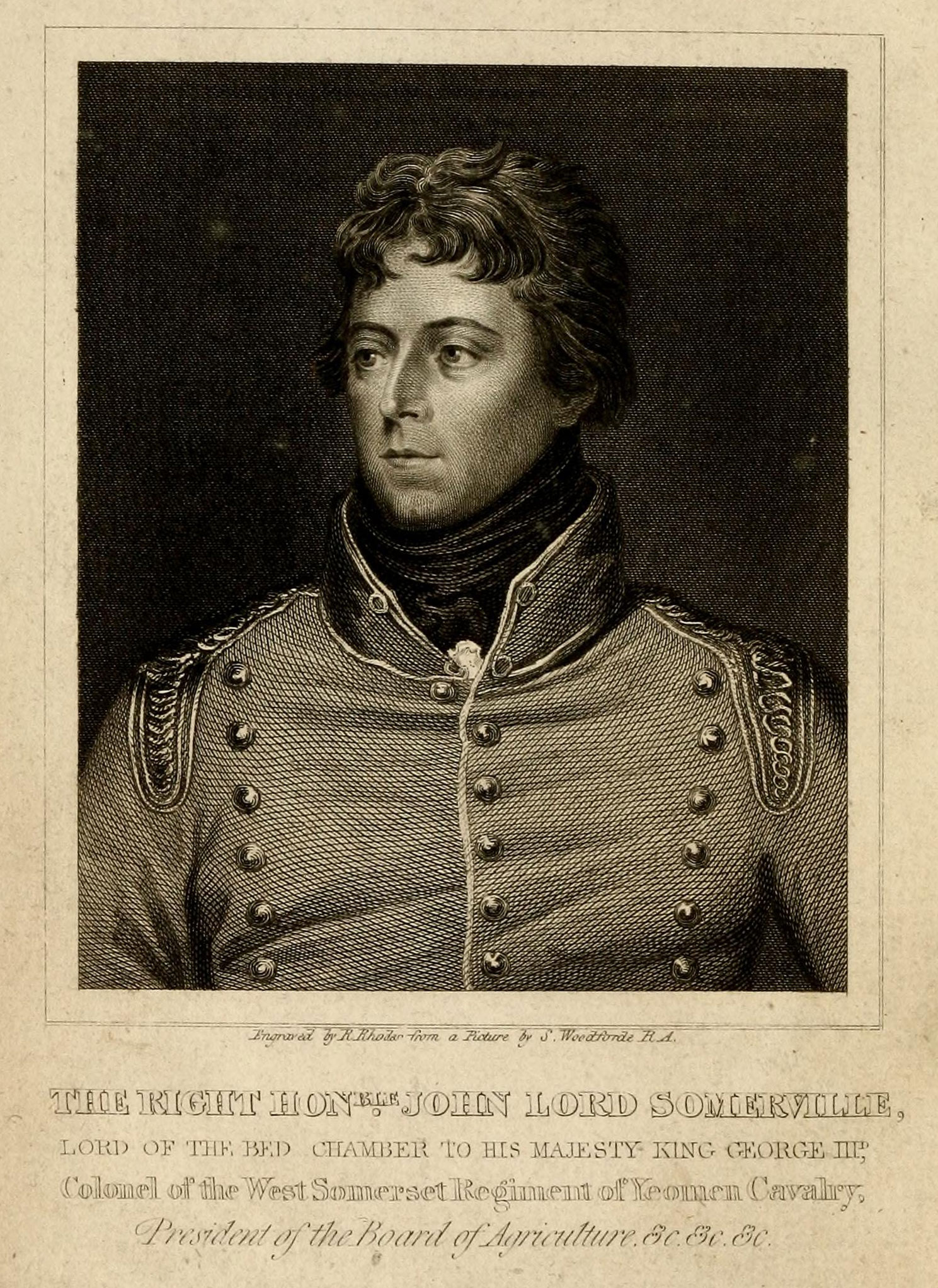
- by Richard Rhodes after Samuel Woodforde
- Born: 21 September 1765
- Died: 5 October 1819 (aged 54); Switzerland
- Occupation: Agriculturist

John Southey Somerville, 15th Lord Somerville (21 September 1765 – 5 October 1819) was a British agriculturist.

== Biography ==
Somerville was born at Fitzhead Court, near Taunton, on 21 Sept. 1765, was son of Hugh Somerville (d. 1795) by his first wife, Elizabeth Lethbridge (d. 1765). The father, Hugh, was younger son of James, thirteenth lord Somerville, head of the Scottish branch of the family. To the latter William Somerville, representative of the older (English) branch, granted in 1730, for monetary advances, the reversion of his remaining English estates. The thirteenth Lord Somerville accordingly became head of the family in both countries when the poet died without issue in 1742. He died in 1765, and his elder son James, the fourteenth lord, on 16 April 1796 without issue.

The grandson, John Southey, was first educated at Harrow, afterwards studied with a private tutor for three years at Peterborough, and finally entered St. John's College, Cambridge, as a fellow-commoner on 28 June 1782. He graduated M.A. in 1785, and then went the grand tour, falling in at Nice with Francis Russell, fifth duke of Bedford, and travelling with him to Leghorn, and through Italy, Switzerland, and France. On coming of age he was confronted with some legal difficulties as to certain Somerset estates inherited from his mother, and, the property being thrown into chancery, Somerville had to be content with one farm, which, though poor when he took it, he converted into a valuable property. After six years Lord-chancellor Thurlow, roused thereto, so it was said (Public Characters, ix. 202–3, 1806–7), by a spirited letter from Somerville, gave judgment in his favour. Soon after entering into his possessions, Somerville stirred up his neighbours in defence of the country, and received the command of a hundred Somerset yeomen. He subsequently became colonel of the West Somerset yeomanry, and continued to serve until a carriage accident compelled him to resign.

On succeeding as fifteenth Lord Somerville, on the death of his father's elder brother, the fourteenth lord, in 1796, he was elected a representative peer of Scotland in the House of Lords, and was re-elected to the parliaments of 1802 and 1806. In 1793 he was appointed an original member of the board of agriculture, and on 23 March 1798 he was elected president of the board through the influence of Pitt, thus ousting Sir John Sinclair, who received twelve votes to Somerville's thirteen. Immediately on his appointment Lord Somerville addressed his energies to reducing the expenses of the board within the limits of the parliamentary grant, and to stopping the extravagance in printing which had been the characteristic of Sir John's tenure of office and had involved the board in serious monetary difficulties. He advocated the offer of premiums for ‘discoveries and improvements in the most important and leading points of husbandry,’ and during his two years of office left the impress of a vigorous and practical mind upon the board's work. In 1799 he was made a lord of the king's bedchamber, with a stipend of 1,000l.; and this brought him into close personal relations with George III, whose interest in agriculture was very keen, and who supported Somerville in many of his schemes. Next to the king, to whom the credit belongs at this period of introducing merino sheep into England, Somerville became the largest breeder and owner of merinos in this country, and his flock became so valuable that two hundred sheep sold for 10,000l. In 1802 he paid a visit to Spain, where he effected the purchase of a valuable flock of pure merinos, and succeeded in obtaining a complete knowledge of the Spanish system of management. By example, by precept, and by printed addresses, he did all in his power to effect an improvement in sheep-breeding. In ‘The Origin of Species’ (ed. 1888, i. 35) Darwin quotes, in support of his arguments, some remarks made by Somerville in his ‘System’ (1800).

Somerville also invented several ingenious and useful devices for agricultural implements, including a plough. He started in 1802 an annual show in London of cattle, sheep, pigs, &c., which he carried on at his own expense for a number of years, and for which he provided the prizes. He was a constant attendant also at the famous sheep-shearings at Woburn and Holkham. He held views far in advance of his time on agricultural education, experimental farms, slaughtering of animals, old-age pensions, and other rural subjects.

He was a keen sportsman, both in the hunting field when young and as an angler in later life. But a succession of accidents greatly impaired an otherwise robust constitution. The winter of 1818 he spent in Italy, and the succeeding summer in France, for the benefit of his health. While journeying through Switzerland he died of dysentery at Vevay, on 5 October 1819. His remains were buried at Aston-Somerville.

Sir Walter Scott eulogised his handsome person and face, his polished manners, and his patriotism (Miscellaneous Prose Works, 1834, iv.). A portrait of him at Matfen Hall, Northumberland, by Samuel Woodforde, R.A. (engraved by James Ward, R.A., in 1800), depicts him in his yeomanry uniform, with, in the background, a team of oxen and a representation of his improved plough (a reproduction of this picture forms the frontispiece to vol. viii. 3rd ser. of the ‘Journal of the Royal Agricultural Society,’ 1897).

Somerville published:

- ‘Short Address to the Yeomanry of England and others,’ Bath, 1795.
- ‘The System followed during the last Two Years by the Board of Agriculture,’ two editions, London, 1800.
- ‘Facts and Observations relative to Sheep, Wool, Ploughs, Oxen,’ &c., 3rd edit., London, 1809.

He also wrote various letters and papers in agricultural publications, and annotated a ‘Work on Wool,’ by Robert Bakewell of Wakefield, London, 1808.

Peerage of Scotland
Preceded by James Somerville, 14th Lord Somerville	Lord Somerville; 1765–1819	Succeeded by Mark Somerville
