= John Somerville, 3rd Lord Somerville =

John Somerville, 3rd Lord Somerville (died 1491) was the son of William Somerville, 2nd Lord Somerville and Janet Mowat. He was a member of the Scottish Parliament. In 1449 he fought with the Scots who defeated the English at Sark. He was also present at the siege of Roxburgh in 1460 during which James II of Scotland died.

== Family ==
Somerville first married Helen Hepburn (daughter of Lord Hailes). He was succeeded by their grandson John Somerville, 4th Lord Somerville, the son of William, Master of Somerville. Their daughter Elizabeth married Gillespic (Archibald) Campbell, Master of Campbell, and was the mother of Colin Campbell, 1st Earl of Argyll.

After Helen's death, John married Marion Baillie, daughter of Sir William Baillie of Lamington. John's son by Marion Baillie, John Somerville of Quothquan, 1st Baron of Cambusnethan, was called 'Red Bag' on account of the red satin satchel he carried while hawking. Red-Bag would later be involved in rivalry over the Somerville family estates (died on Flodden Field 1513). After Lord John died, Marion married Humphrey Colquhoun, 10th of Colquhoun and 12th of Luss.

== Alliance with the Boyds ==
On 9 July 1466, Lord John, with the Boyds, Adam Hepburn, Master of Hailes, and Andrew Ker of Cessford, abducted James III of Scotland who was hunting near Linlithgow Palace to Edinburgh. The Boyds then attempted to gain control of the Scottish government for two years. Although John Somerville himself had assisted the Boyds at the abduction, in November 1469, Lord John attended the Parliament that condemned Sir Alexander Boyd to beheading for the abduction of James III in 1466.

== Marriages of William, Master of Somerville and John 'Red Bag' Somerville ==
According to the family history written by the 11th Lord Somerville, Lord John's heir, William, Master of Somerville, was born in 1453. He married firstly Marjorie Montgomery in June 1476. The 11th Lord wrote that James IV of Scotland visited Lord John at Cowthally Castle in September 1489, following the marriage of John's second son, John 'Red Bag' Somerville to Elizabeth Carmichael. (Elizabeth by her previous marriage was a sister-in-law of George Douglas, 4th Earl of Angus's wife) However, there is no record of this visit in the King's financial accounts.

William, Master of Somerville, died sometime after 18 May 1491. Soon after Lord John died, and on 14 February 1492 Marion Baillie, Lady Somerville, sued for 1000 marks to be given according to a marriage contract made for her deceased son William, Master of Somerville, to Jonet Douglas, daughter of William Douglas of Drumlanrig.

== Sources ==
- G. E. C., ed. Geoffrey F. White. The Complete Peerage. (London: St. Catherine Press, 1953) Vol. XII, Part 1, pp. 92–93.
- Scott, Walter, ed., James Somerville, author, The Memorie of the Somervilles by James, 11th Lord Somerville, vol. 1, Ballantyne, Edinburgh (1815)
- Scott, Walter, ed., The Memorie of the Somervilles by James, 11th Lord Somerville, vol. 2, Ballantyne, Edinburgh (1815)
- MacDougall, Norman, James III: a political study, John Donald (1982)

Peerage of Scotland
Preceded by William Somerville	Lord Somerville; 1456–1491	Succeeded by John Somerville
