= Lord Somerville =

Scottish title of nobility

Arms of Somerville: Azure, three mullets or 2 and 1 between seven cross-crosslets fitchée, argent 3, 1, 2 and 1

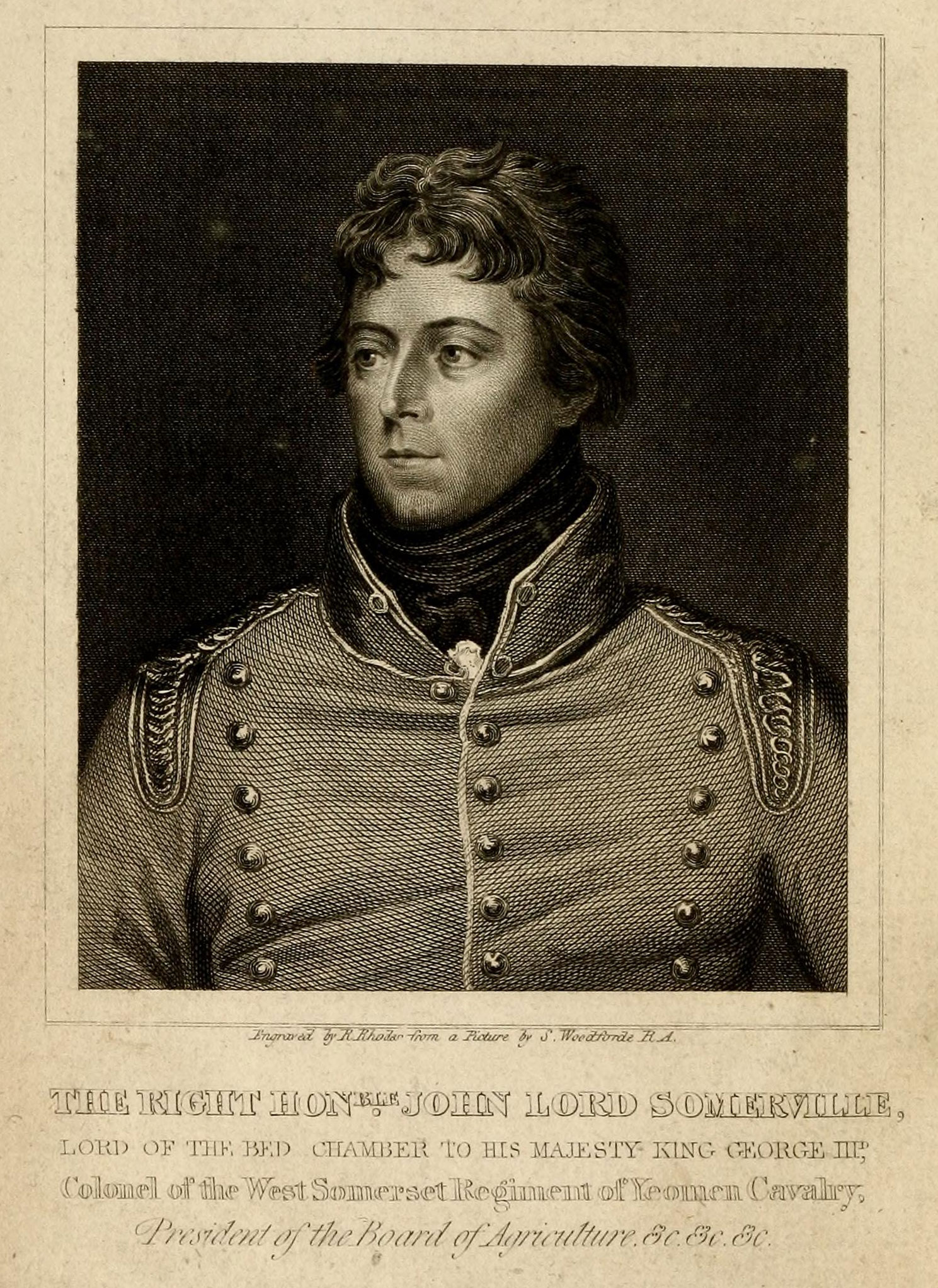
John Southey Somerville, 15th Lord Somerville (1765–1819)—engraved by Richard Rhodes (1765–1838), after a portrait by Samuel Woodforde (1763–1817)

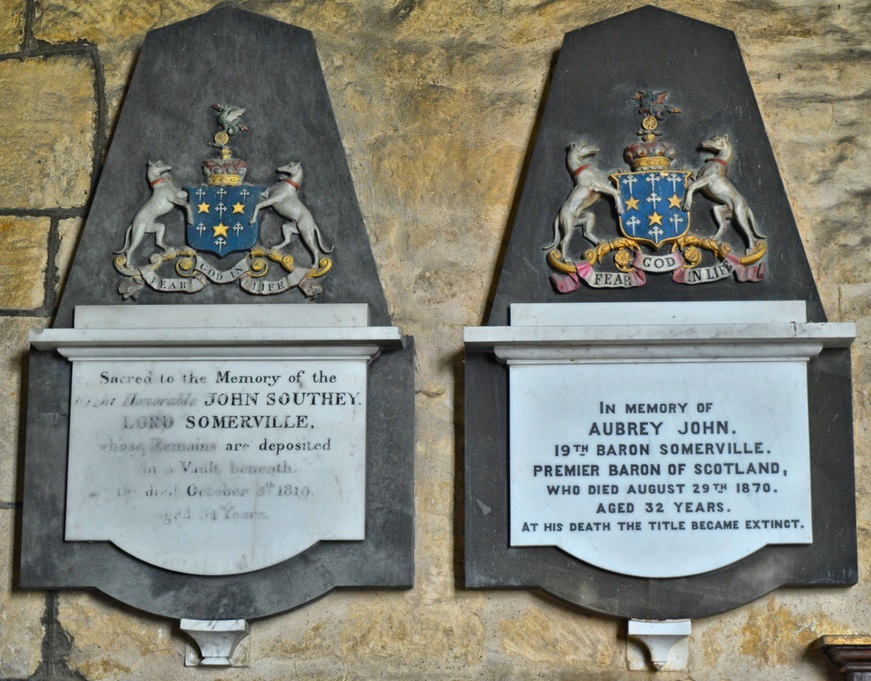
Mural monuments to the last of the Somervilles, Aston Somerville Church, Worcestershire

Lord Somerville is a title in the Peerage of Scotland which is subject to a number of ambiguities. The date of creation is not known with certainty but it was probably created about 1435 for Thomas Somerville, Justiciar of Scotland. The title was omitted in 1606 when an ordered list of the Scottish peerage was produced following the union of the Scottish and English crowns, and the title was not used during the 17th century. In 1723, however, the House of Lords ratified and acknowledged the title for James Somerville the 13th Lord. The consecutive numbers ascribed to the numerous Lords differ according to which authority is consulted. The list below uses the numbers favoured by Burkes Peerage.

The Somervilles claim descent from William de Somerville, given Carnwath by David I of Scotland in the 12th century.

A family history was written by James Somerville, 11th Lord Somerville in 1679. He related that William the Lion made John Somerville, his falconer, baron of Linton in Roxburghshire for killing a monstrous worm in 1174. The Worm of Linton was three Scots yards long and coloured like an adder. After stalking the beast for several days, Sir John killed it with a long iron-clad lance with a Catherine wheel fitted near its point. From this exploit the Somervilles used a wyvern in their heraldry. The poet Blind Harry mentions the knighting of Walter Somerville of Newbigging and his son David at the battle of Biggar by Alexander III of Scotland.

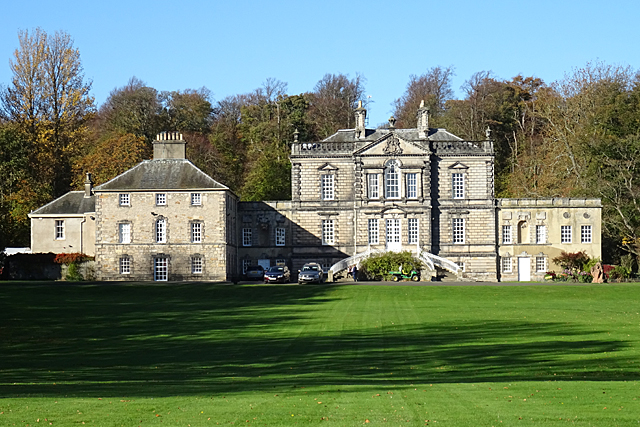
Drum House, Gilmerton, near Edinburgh

The later family seat at Drum House, Gilmerton, near Edinburgh was acquired as a result of the marriage of Sir Walter Somerville of Linton and Carnwath to the daughter and heiress of Sir John Herring. Carnwath was sold in the 16th century and Hugh Somerville, the 7th Lord, built a substantial tower house at Drum in 1585, which was replaced between 1726 and 1734 with a Palladian mansion designed by architect William Adam. The Drum estate was sold in 1862.

The family's earliest known ancestor is Sir Gualter de Somerville (anglicized as Walter de Somerville), a Norman knight and companion of William the Conqueror who, for his service during the Norman conquest of England, was awarded the lordship of Whichnour, in Stafford, and the land that is now known as Aston Somerville, in Evesham. One of Gualter's sons, William de Somerville, was close to King David I of Scotland and, for their friendship, David created for him the barony of Carnwath in the county of Lanark. He also acquired the barony of Linton in Roxburghshire. William's descendants, like himself, were close to royalty, and they went onto marry into prominent Scottish families. A descendant of Walter de Somerville was the English poet William Somervile (1675–1742).

The Somervilles of Cambusnethan were a scion of the Somerville family line; among their descendants were the physician William Somerville (1771–1860) and his wife and cousin, the polymath Mary Somerville (1780–1872). (Note: The Somerville family name was given to Somerville College, Oxford in 1879 in honour of Mary Somerville,)

== Lords Somerville ==
- Thomas Somerville, 1st Lord Somerville (c. 1370–1444)
- William Somerville, 2nd Lord Somerville (c. 1400–1456)
- John Somerville, 3rd Lord Somerville (d. 1491)
- John Somerville, 4th Lord Somerville (c. 1484–1523)
- Hugh Somerville, 5th Lord Somerville (c. 1484–1549)
- James Somerville, 6th Lord Somerville (c. 1518–1569)
- Hugh Somerville, 7th Lord Somerville (1547–1597)
- Gilbert Somerville, 8th Lord Somerville (1568–1618)
- Hugh Somerville, 9th Lord Somerville (c. 1573–1640), buried in Liberton Kirk
- James Somerville, 10th Lord Somerville (1595–1677), buried in Holyrood Abbey
- James Somerville, 11th Lord Somerville (1632–1693)
- James Somerville, 12th Lord Somerville (1674–1709)
- James Somerville, 13th Lord Somerville (1698–1765)
- James Somerville, 14th Lord Somerville (1727–1796)
- John Southey Somerville, 15th Lord Somerville (1765–1819)
- Mark Somerville, 16th Lord Somerville (1784–1842)
- Kenelm Somerville, 17th Lord Somerville (1787–1864)
- Hugh Somerville, 18th Lord Somerville (1839–1868)
- Aubrey John Somerville, 19th Lord Somerville (1838–1870)
