= William Graham, 3rd Earl of Menteith =

Scottish magnate

William Graham, 3rd Earl of Menteith (c. 1500 – c. 1543) was a Scottish magnate and third Earl of Menteith.

Signature of William Graham 3rd Earl of Menteith

== Biography ==
He was the son of Alexander Graham, 2nd Earl of Menteith (c. 1475 – c. 1537), and Margaret Buchanan. He was the great-grandson of Malise Graham, 1st Earl of Menteith (1406–1490). In 1521 he married Margaret Moubray, daughter of John Moubray of Barnbougle (she had previously been married to John Cornwall before his death in 1513), and they had five sons and two daughters, including:

- Lady Margaret Graham, who married Archibald Campbell, 4th Earl of Argyll
- John Graham, who succeeded his father as Earl of Menteith
- Lady Christian Graham, who married William Livingstone of Kilsyth, a Master of Household to James VI, their eldest son was William Livingstone of Kilsyth

On 20 May 1527, when he was titled Master of Menteith, he ran away from the King's army at Solway, but was pardoned despite it being considered an act of treason. He became the third Earl, receiving sasine of the Earldom on 16 May 1537. After the death of King James V in 1542, William was an opponent of the English interest in Scotland and on 24 July 1543 he signed a bond made by Cardinal Beaton to stop King Henry VIII of England from getting possession of the infant Mary, Queen of Scots.

William Graham was killed in a clan fight some time in autumn 1543, but certainly by 23 January 1544; some sources state that he was killed in October 1543 by the Tutor of Appin (a member of the Stewart family), after the Stewarts and their army ate a wedding feast to which the Earl had been invited. Some accounts also tell of the Murrays of Athole being the raiders of the feast. According to most stories, a band of Stewarts were passing through Menteith and happened upon a wedding feast. They ate up all the food, drank all the wine, and left within a short while. The Earl pursued them and was slain or mortally wounded by the robbers. Historian Andrew Fleming Hutchison recorded the colorful details this way:

Another version [of Graham’s death] sends the men of Athole to the Isle on a friendly visit. The Earl happened to be out at the time, but his dinner was cooked and waiting his return. The Murrays, probably thinking it a good joke, gathered up the roasted fowls destined for his dinner and took their departure. Soon the Earl arrived and, learning what had occurred, set off in eager and angry pursuit up the slopes of Mondhui. The leader of the Murrays turned in a friendly way, no doubt intending to explain the joke, and as he saw the Earl fitting an arrow to his bow, he shouted out as he handled his own, "Over me and over you!” ”No", cried the incensed Earl, "in me and in you!” And in him it was, for the Murray's arrow pierced his heart. His men, however, drove the enemy over the hill and returned with their dying master to the Isle.

Peerage of Scotland
Preceded by Alexander Graham	Earl of Menteith c. 1537 – c. 1543	Succeeded by John Graham
