= Meiler de Bermingham =

Norman-Irish lord (died 1529)

Meiler de Bermingham was a Norman-Irish lord who died in 1529.

Meiler was the last lord of Athenry before contact was resumed with the government in Dublin.

Peerage of Ireland
Preceded by Thomas III de Bermingham	Baron Athenry; 1500–1529	Succeeded by John de Bermingham
