= Solway Moss =

- Peat bog
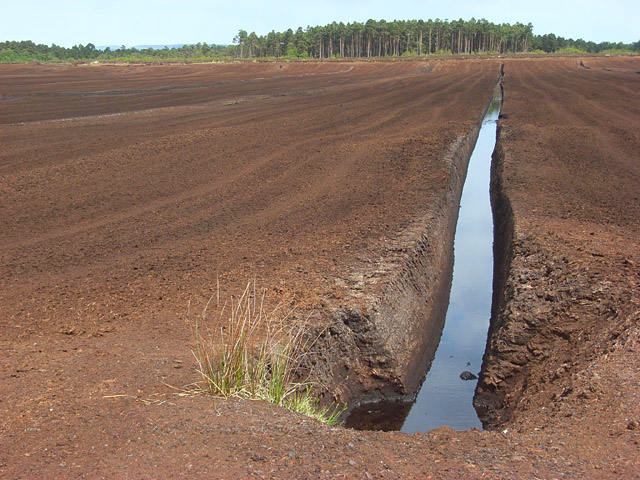
- Peat workings at Solway Moss

- Coordinates: 55.011225°N 3.025749°W
- Location: Cumbria, England

Solway Moss, also known as Solway Flow, is a moss (lowland peat bog), in the Cumberland district in Cumbria, England near the Scottish border and less than 1 mile (1.6 km) west of Longtown at grid reference NY345690. In 2005 the moss was the subject of a campaign by organisations including the RSPB and Friends of the Earth to get the area declared a Special Area of Conservation in order to prevent the destruction of the rare raised bog ecology.

In 1542 it was the location of the Battle of Solway Moss.

On 16 November 1771, during the night, Solway Moss burst, flooding local farms and settlements. one of several rivers to do so in the Great Flood of 1771.
