= The Drum, Edinburgh =

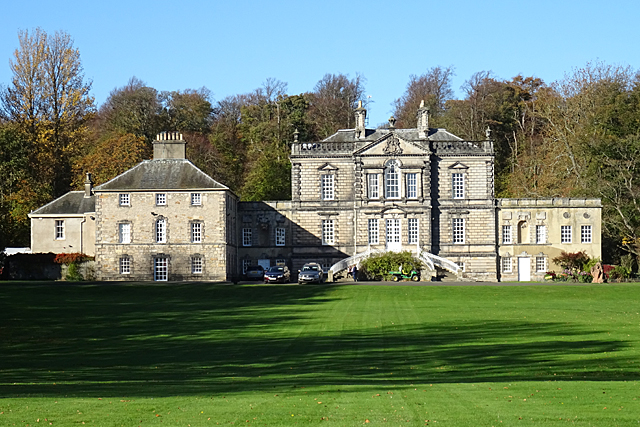
- Entrance front of The Drum

- Location in Edinburgh council area
- 55.9084°N 3.1201°W

History
- Built: 1726–1734
- Built for: John Somerville, 13th Lord Somerville

Site notes
- Architect: William Adam

Listed Building – Category A
- Designated: 14 July 1966
- Reference no.: LB28052

Inventory of Gardens and Designed Landscapes in Scotland
- Official name: The Drum
- Designated: 30 June 1987
- Reference no.: GDL00356

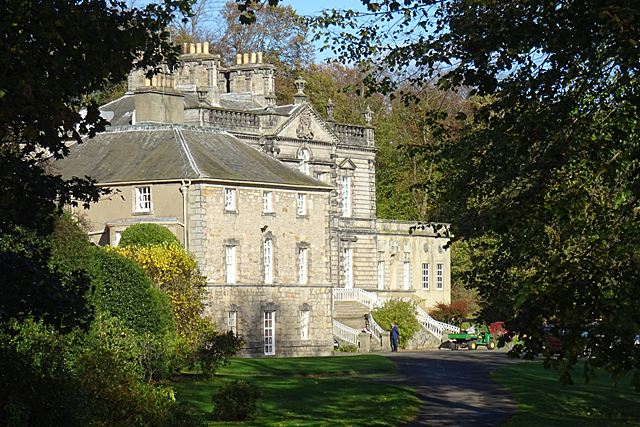
The Drum, driveway

The Drum is an 18th-century country house and estate on the outskirts of Edinburgh, Scotland. Located between the Gilmerton and Danderhall areas, The Drum is 4 miles (6.4 km) south-east of the city centre. The Drum was the seat of the Lords Somerville from the later Middle Ages, who built a 16th-century house on the estate. This was replaced in the 1720s with a classical house by William Adam. Sold by Lord Somerville in the early 19th century, the house remains in private hands.

== History ==
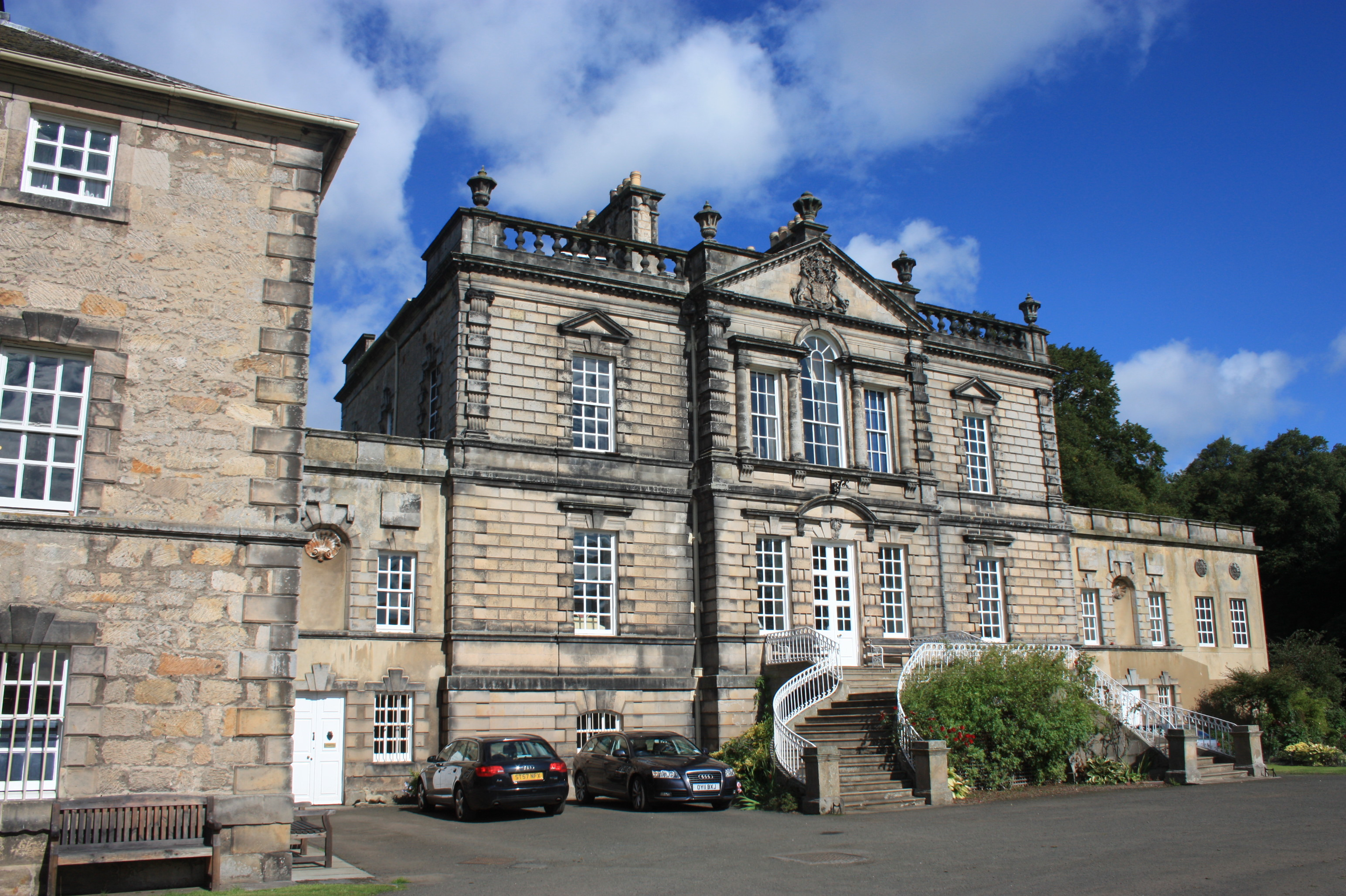
Drum House, Edinburgh

In the Middle Ages the area was part of a royal hunting forest named Drumselch, which extended north to Holyroodhouse. The lands were held by the Herring family until the 14th century, when Sir Walter de Somerville of Linton and Carnwath (d.1380) married Geilles, daughter of Sir John Herring of Gilmerton. By this marriage Sir Walter acquired half of the Gilmerton estate, including the lands of Drum. Sir Walter's grandson Thomas (d.1434) was created Lord Somerville by King James I, and The Drum remained in Sir Walter's family until 1800.

During the 16th century a dispute arose between the Lords Somerville and another branch of the family over the possession of Gilmerton and The Drum. This was resolved in 1578 after several years of legal debate, in favour of Hugh Somerville, 7th Lord Somerville (1547–1597). Subsequently, Lord Somerville re-established himself at The Drum, and in 1584 he commissioned the mason-architect John Mylne to build a new house. The project was advised by Somerville's kinsman Robert, Lord Seton, and the house was built between June 1584 and October 1585. It was damaged by fire some years later, and again in 1629, but was rebuilt each time. It was described by the 11th Lord Somerville in 1679:

The roumes are few, but fair and large; the entrie and stair-caice extremely ill-placed, neither is the outward forme modish, being built all in lenth in forme of a church.

In 1726 James Somerville, 13th Lord Somerville (1698–1765), commissioned the present house at The Drum from the architect William Adam. The new house incorporates the ground floor of the 16th-century mansion in its west wing. A matching east wing was planned but never built. The pediment over the entrance bears the arms of Lord Somerville and his first wife, while over the fireplace inside the Somerville arms are shown with those of his second wife, indicating the date of the interior as after 1736.

The Palladian design of the façade has been criticised for its "slightly muddled use of classical elements", with a central Venetian window and rusticated pilasters on the first floor apparently unsupported by any similar structure on the ground floor. The interior is decorated with "magnificent stucco work". The curved double stair leading to the main entrance was added in 1782. William Adam also laid out new parks around the house, including avenues focused on several buildings and monuments, few of which survive. From 1756 the Edinburgh Mercat Cross was located at The Drum, following its removal from the High Street, until its restoration in 1866. A replica is now located by the stables.

The estate was broken up in the early years of the 19th century, with the house purchased in 1862 by John More Nisbett, who also purchased much of the original grounds. His second son Hamilton More Nisbett (1868–1955) trained as an architect under John Kinross, and inherited The Drum on his older brother's death in 1939. His architectural practice was afterwards based at The Drum, and he published a history of the house. The Drum is still owned and occupied by the More Nisbett family.

The Drum is a category A listed building. The parks are included on the Inventory of Gardens and Designed Landscapes in Scotland, the national listing of significant gardens, and are described as a "good example of William Adam's formal style of landscape design carried out in the 1700s with the structure still relatively intact today".

Edinburgh's original mercat cross (market cross) was relocated from the Royal Mile to the grounds of Drum House in 1756 (a replica was later placed close to St Giles Cathedral during the 19th century).
