= Hugh Somerville, 5th Lord Somerville =

Scottish politician (c. 1484–1549)

Hugh Somerville, 5th Lord Somerville (c. 1484 – 1549) was a lord of the Parliament of Scotland. He is sometimes reckoned to be the 4th Lord Somerville. He succeeded his brother, John Somerville, 4th Lord Somerville. Hugh and John were sons of William Somerville, Master of Somerville, and Marjory Montgomerie.

== Hugh and Sir James Hamilton of Finnart ==
Hugh Somerville was in dispute with his uncle Sir John Somerville of Cambusnethan (known as Red-bag). John Somerville had forfeited his lands for his part in the fight in Edinburgh called 'Cleanse the Causeway.' Hugh, Lord Somerville, benefitted from John's loss. When Red-bag gained the upper hand in his legal struggle against him in 1528, Hugh asked James Hamilton of Finnart to be his backer. In April 1536, Hugh's son James married Agnes the daughter of James Hamilton of Finnart at Craignethan Castle. Later, Hugh sat on the assize that condemned Hamilton of Finnart to death for treason on 16 August 1540. By Finnart's death he gained the bailiary of Carstairs.

== Hugh and Regent Arran ==
Hugh was captured by the English at the battle of Solway Moss in 1542, and released in 1543. Henry VIII of England gave several of the Scottish prisoners presents of money on 28 January 1543; Somerville got £200. The English soldiers who had captured him, Richard Greme and John Brisco of Crofton, took their dispute over ransom money to the Privy Council which asked the Duke of Suffolk to arbitrate.

On his return to Scotland, Hugh became involved in a factional struggle against the Governor of Scotland, Regent Arran, and was associated with the Earl of Angus. On 1 November 1543, Hugh was arrested with Lord Maxwell and imprisoned in Edinburgh Castle. The Abbot of Paisley had kept the pair talking on the Royal Mile while waiting for a serjeant to arrest them in the name of Mary, Queen of Scots and the Regent. Somerville was then taken to Blackness Castle. The English diplomat Ralph Sadler thought they had been foolish to come to Edinburgh where their enemies the Regent and Cardinal Beaton had full control.

Hugh's last letter of 21 March 1549 explains his position. He, and other Scottish lords captured at Solway Moss in 1542, had undertaken to promote the marriage of Mary to Prince Edward. In November 1543, he was planning to go to England with counsel for the marriage when Regent Arran captured him in Edinburgh. Hugh was writing in 1549 to Thomas Wharton for the return of his son James for 20 days, who was then a hostage in England in his father's place.

On 21 October 1545, Hugh's second son John wrote to the Queen Dowager, Mary of Guise from Cowthally Castle. He said that Hugh, the Earl of Angus, and George Douglas and all their friends and favourers would resist the potential marriage of Regent Arran's son, James Hamilton to Queen Mary, despite rewards promised by the Hamiltons. He asked for her opinion which was sent to Cowthally and received by the Somerville's ally James Douglas of Drumlanrig.

Lord Somerville seems to have made his peace with Regent Arran, and spent Easter 1547 with him Linlithgow Palace.

== Marriages and family ==
He first married Anna Hamilton (d. 1516), a daughter of James Hamilton, 1st Earl of Arran.

He married, secondly, Jonet Maitland in 1516. She was the daughter of William Maitland, killed at the battle of Flodden, and Margaret Seton, a daughter of Lord Seton. Their children included;

- Agnes Somerville, who was betrothed to John Tweedie younger of Drumelzier in 1533
- Elizabeth Somerville, who married John Carmichael, their eldest son was Sir John Carmichael.
- James Somerville, 6th Lord Somerville
- Margaret Somerville, who married Charles Murray of Cockpool, and was the mother of John Murray, 1st Earl of Annandale
- John Somerville
- Hugh Somerville
- Michael Somerville
- William Somerville

The principal residence of Lord Somerville was Cowthally Castle which Hugh rebuilt in style after gaining possession in 1524. Hugh Somerville died in 1549. He was buried in the Somerville aisle at Carnwath Church.

== Sources ==
- Archbold, William Arthur Jobson (1898). "Somerville, Hugh". In Lee, Sidney (ed.). Dictionary of National Biography. Vol. 53. London: Smith, Elder & Co. pp. 250, 251.
- Cameron, Jamie, James V (Tuckwell: East Linton, 1998).
- Dickinson, William Croft, ed., Court Book of the Barony of Carnwath: 1513-1542 (Scottish History Society: Edinburgh, 1937).
- Gairdner & Brodie, ed., Letters and Papers Foreign and Domestic of Henry VIII, vol. 18 part 2 (London, 1902)
- Paul & Thomson, ed., Register of the Great Seal: 1513-1546 (HM General Register House: Edinburgh, 1883).
- McKean, Charles, The Scottish Chateau (Sutton, 2001).
- Scott, Walter, ed., The Memorie of the Somervilles by James, 11th Lord Somerville, vol. 1 (Ballantyne: Edinburgh, 1815).
- Scott, Walter, ed., James Somerville, author, The Memorie of the Somervilles by James, 11th Lord Somerville, vol. 2 (Ballantyne: Edinburgh, 1815).

Peerage of Scotland
Preceded by John Somerville	Lord Somerville c.1523–1549	Succeeded by James Somerville
