= Aston Somerville =

Village in Worcestershire, England

Coordinates: 52°02′31″N 1°56′05″W

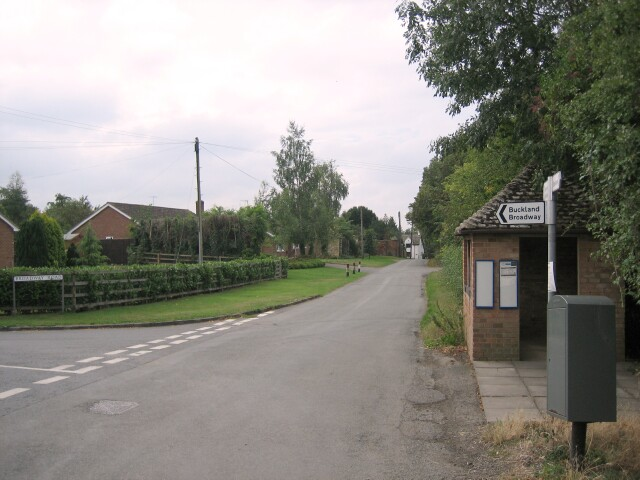
- Aston Somerville

- Location within Worcestershire
- OS grid reference: SP045382
- Civil parish: Aston Somerville
- District: Wychavon
- Shire county: Worcestershire
- Region: West Midlands
- Country: England
- Sovereign state: United Kingdom
- Post town: BROADWAY
- Postcode district: WR12
- Police: West Mercia
- Fire: Hereford and Worcester
- Ambulance: West Midlands

Aston Somerville is a small village approximately 3 miles (4.8 km) south of Evesham, Worcestershire, England.

== History ==
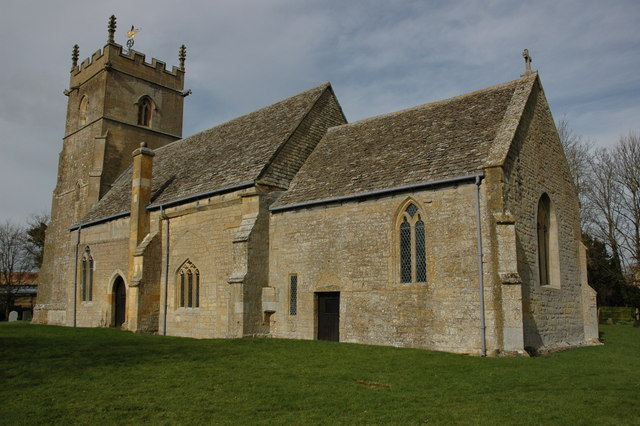
St Mary's Church

The name Aston derives from the Old English ēasttūn meaning 'east settlement'. The affix Somerville derives from the Somerville family, who held land in the village in the 13th century.

Historically, the Aston Somerville Village has consisted of three individual farms (originally known as the Lower, Middle and Upper Farms), albeit they have usually been farmed as one estate (most notably attributed to the Crowther Family in the 19th century).

St Mary's Church is a grade I listed building dating from the 13th century.

=== War memorials ===
The following names appear on the Village's war memorial in St. Mary's Church:

- Percy Baverstock
- Earnest Stock Dale
- Gerald Haines - who is also commemorated on the Broadway War Memorial
- George Frederick Hoddinot - "Fell at Damery" (also recorded on a tombstone)
- James Pay
- Alfred Perkins
- Leonard Pitman

Recorded on another gravestone in the Churchyard is another World War I casualty:

- Henry West KRR "Missing at Langemarch"

The sole World War II casualty recorded is:

- Geoffrey Norman Wilson (son of Lt Col D.D. Wilson)

=== Marriage records ===
As of July 2012, information on marriages in Aston Somerville that occurred between 1700 and 1812 is available on the internet.

=== 1994 Harrier crash ===
On 14 January 1994, Harrier ZD349 crashed, which killed the American pilot, from RAF Wittering, Captain Brenden Hearney (26 March 1964 - 1994), aged 29. He may have stayed in his aircraft, to avoid hitting a school, and did not eject. The wreckage was over two or three fields. His father was General Richard D. Hearney. Brenden had studied Engineering at the University of Southern California, where he was part of the Skull and Dagger (honor society).
