= Alexander Graham, 2nd Earl of Menteith =

Scottish magnate

Alexander Graham, 2nd Earl of Menteith (May 6, 1472 –c. 1537) was a Scottish magnate.

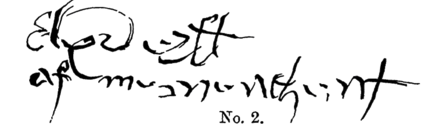
Signature of Alexander Graham

== Biography ==
Graham appears in the records of Scotland as the Earl of Menteith in 1493. Likely the grandson of Malise Graham, it is of some debate whether this Earl Alexander was the son of Patrick Graham (Earl Malise's second son) or was the son of Alexander Graham (Earl Malise's first son who died in 1471). Most evidence seems to show that Patrick Graham was the likely father.

Prior to 1493 and after the death of Earl Malise Graham in 1490, he is referenced, but at that time he is only referenced as heir. During the 15th century in Scotland, one was often termed an heir when the age of majority had not been reached. It is therefore likely that Alexander Graham, this second earl, was born around 1475.

Robbers from the Clan Gregor in the year 1533 stole 40 cows from him and his son William, Master of Menteith. He married Margaret Buchanan, daughter of Walter Buchanan of the Clan Buchanan, and had two sons and a daughter. He died between the 31st of January 1536 and the 27th of February, in 1537.

Peerage of Scotland
Preceded by Malise Graham	Earl of Menteith c. 1493 – c. 1537	Succeeded by William Graham
