= John de Bermingham =

Anglo-Irish lord (??–1547)

John de Bermingham (died 1547) was an Anglo-Irish lord.

John succeeded upon the death of his father, Meiler. He was the ninth lord since the town's foundation in the late 1230s. During his lifetime, Athenry began to decline in response to warfare with Clanricarde to the south-east, the Ó Ceallaigh of Uí Maine to the east, and the Ó Conchobhairs and Mac Diarmadas of Síol Muiredaig and Moylurg. Its trade had been secondary to Galway, yet as late as 1540 the town was well-populated and featuring new buildings, indicating that John's era enjoyed some prosperity.

Contemporary Irish annals such as the Annals of Loch Cé (and their successor, the Annals of the Four Masters), only give allusive references to events in the area, and few directly concerning de Bermingham himself.

A notable feature of his lordship is the North Gate of Athenry, which is believed to have been built in his time. It is now the only surviving town gate, though over two-thirds of the wall, enclosing at least one hundred and fifty acres, survive.

Peerage of Ireland
Preceded by Meiler de Bermingham	Baron Athenry; 1529–1547	Succeeded by Richard II de Bermingham
