= Cowthally Castle =

12th century runined castle in South Lanarkshire, Scotland

- Carnwath, Lanarkshire
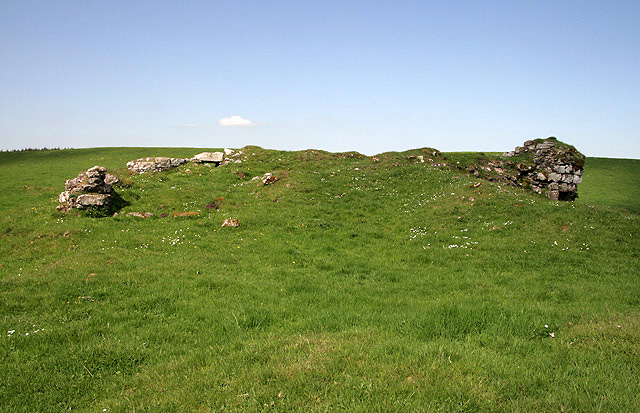
- Remains of Cowthally Castle

Site information
- Controlled by: Clan Somerville

Location
- Location of Cowthally Castle
- Coordinates: 55.7159°N 3.6392°W

Site history
- Built: 12th century

Cowthally Castle, also known as Couthalley, is a ruined L-plan castle near Carnwath, Lanarkshire, Scotland. The remains are protected as a scheduled monument.

The castle appears to have been constructed in the 12th century, and was re-built in 1375. The castle passed to Sir John Somerville, 4th Baron of Linton through marriage in 1317 to Lady Elizabeth Douglas. The castle was altered and extended in 1415 and again in 1524. The castle was besieged in 1557 and was partially destroyed and was rebuilt in 1586.

The buildings at the Castle surviving in the 17th century were carefully described by the James Somerville in his family history; the Memorie of the Somervilles. James Somerville claims that James IV came to Cowthally for a wedding "infare" in 1489 or the second year of his reign.

Mary, Queen of Scots stayed at Cowthally Castle on 24 August 1563.

== Sources ==
- Scott, Walter, ed., The Memorie of the Somervilles by James, 11th Lord Somerville, vol. 1, Ballantyne, Edinburgh (1815)
- Scott, Walter, ed., The Memorie of the Somervilles by James, 11th Lord Somerville, vol. 2, Ballantyne, Edinburgh (1815)
