= Hay (surname) =

Hay is an English and Scottish surname, shortened from the Scoto-Norman de la Haye. A common variation is Hayes, and to a lesser degree Haynes, Haines, or Hughes. Notable people with the surname include:

- Alexander Hay (disambiguation), several people
- Andrew Leith Hay (1785–1862), Scottish soldier, politician and author
- Ann Hawkes Hay (1745–1785), American soldier
- Arthur Hay, several people
- Barry Hay (born 1948), Dutch musician
- Bill Hay (1935–2024), Canadian ice hockey player
- Brogan Hay (born 1999), Scottish footballer
- Cody Hay (born 1983), Canadian figure skater
- Colin Hay (born 1953), Scottish-Australian musician
- Daisy Hay (fl. 2006–2022), British professor of English Literature
- Danny Hay (born 1975), New Zealand soccer player
- David Hay (disambiguation), several people
- Dennis Hay (born 1940), Scottish field hockey player and coach
- Denys Hay (1915–1994), British historian
- Douglas Hay (1876–1967), New Zealand cricket player and administrator
- Edward Hay (disambiguation), several people
- Eliza Monroe Hay (1786–1840), American socialite
- Elizabeth Hay (disambiguation), several people
- Elspeth Hay (born 1929/30), British sprinter
- Fernando Soto-Hay y García (fl. 1995), Mexican member of the Scout Movement
- Florence Hay (1932–1982) American baseball player
- Garry Hay (born 1977), Scottish footballer
- George Hay (disambiguation), several people
- Gilbert Hay (disambiguation), several people
- Gordon Hay (born 1952/53), Scottish author and translator
- Grace Marguerite Hay Drummond-Hay (1894–1946), British journalist and aviation pioneer
- Graham Hay (born 1965), Scottish footballer (Airdrieonians)
- Harry Hay (1912–2002), American gay rights activist
- Helen Scott Hay (1869–1932), American nurse
- Henry Hay (disambiguation), multiple people
- Hugh Hay (1889–1965), British World War I flying ace
- Ian Hay, pen name of John Hay Beith (1876–1952), British schoolmaster and soldier
- James Hay (disambiguation), multiple people
- Jocelyn Hay (1927–2014), British journalist
- John Hay (disambiguation), various including:
  - John Hay (1838–1905), American politician
  - John Hay (Henley MP) (1919–1998), British politician
  - John MacDougall Hay (1879–1919), Scottish novelist
  - Sir John Dalrymple-Hay, 3rd Baronet (1821–1912), British admiral
  - Sir John Hay, 6th Baronet (1788–1838), British politician
  - Lord John Hay (disambiguation), several people
- Kathryn Hay (born 1975), Australian politician
- Keith Hay (1917–1997), New Zealand businessman
- Logan Hay (1871–1942), American lawyer, historian, and politician
- Louise Hay (1926–2017), American New Age writer
- Louise Hay (1935–1989), French-born American mathematician
- Louise Linton (née Hay) (born 1980), Scottish-American actor
- Lucy Hay, Countess of Carlisle (1599–1660), English courtier
- Margaret Fordyce Dalrymple Hay (1889–1975), Australian librarian
- Lady Margaret Hay (1918–1975), British courtier
- Marion E. Hay (1865–1933), American politician
- Mark Hay (born 1952), American marine ecologist
- Mary Hay (actress) (1901–1957), American stage and screen actress
- Mary Garrett Hay (1857–1928), American suffragist
- Mavis Doriel Hay (1894–1979), British author and craftswoman
- Merle Hay (1896–1917), American soldier
- Millar Hay (born 1946), Scottish footballer
- Milton Hay (1817–1893), American lawyer and politician
- Oliver Perry Hay (1846–1930), American palaeontologist
- R.W. Hay (1786–1861), British public official.
- Richard Hay (born 1952), Indian politician and Member of Parliament
- Robert Hay (disambiguation), several people
- Roger Hay (1889–1917), British World War I flying ace
- Roy Hay (horticulturalist) (1910–1989), English horticultural journalist and broadcaster
- Roy Hay (musician) (born 1961), British keyboard player
- Sir Rupert Hay (1893–1962), British Indian Army officer and administrator in British India
- Samuel McClellan Hay (1825–1906), American banker and politician in Wisconsin
- Samuel Ross Hay (1865–1944), American Methodist bishop
- Udney Hay (1739–1806), American soldier, politician
- Trevor Hay (1945–2016), Australian chess master
- Walter Hay (born 1901), Scottish footballer
- Wellington Hay (1864–1932), Canadian politician
- Will Hay (1888–1949), British comic actor
- William Hay (disambiguation), several people

As aristocratic Scottish family name (see Clan Hay):

- John Hay, 1st Lord Hay of Yester (c. 1450 – 1508)
- John Hay, 2nd Lord Hay of Yester (died 1513)
- John Hay, 3rd Lord Hay of Yester (died 1543)
- John Hay, 4th Lord Hay of Yester (died 1557)
- William Hay, 5th Lord Hay of Yester (died 1586)
- William Hay, 6th Lord Hay of Yester (died 1591)
- James Hay, 7th Lord Hay of Yester (died 1609)
- John Hay, 8th Lord Hay of Yester (1593–1653) (became Earl of Tweeddale in 1646)
- John Hay, 2nd Earl of Tweeddale (1626–1697) (became Marquess of Tweeddale in 1694)
- John Hay, 2nd Marquess of Tweeddale (1645–1713)
- Charles Hay, 3rd Marquess of Tweeddale (1670–1715)
- John Hay, 4th Marquess of Tweeddale (1695–1762)
- George Hay, 5th Marquess of Tweeddale (1758–1770)
- George Hay, 6th Marquess of Tweeddale (1700–1787)
- George Hay, 7th Marquess of Tweeddale (1753–1804)
- George Hay, 8th Marquess of Tweeddale (1787–1876)
- Arthur Hay, 9th Marquess of Tweeddale (1824–1878)
- William Montagu Hay, 10th Marquess of Tweeddale (1826–1911)
- William George Montagu Hay, 11th Marquess of Tweeddale (1884–1967)
- David George Montagu Hay, 12th Marquess of Tweeddale (1921–1979)
- Edward Douglas John Hay, 13th Marquess of Tweeddale (1947–2005)
- George Hay, 1st Earl of Kinnoull (died 1634)
- George Hay, 2nd Earl of Kinnoull (died 1644)
- George Hay, 3rd Earl of Kinnoull (died 1650)
- William Hay, 4th Earl of Kinnoull (died 1677)
- George Hay, 5th Earl of Kinnoull (died 1687)
- William Hay, 6th Earl of Kinnoull (died 1709)
- Thomas Hay, 7th Earl of Kinnoull (died 1719)
- George Henry Hay, 8th Earl of Kinnoull (1689–1758)
- Thomas Hay, 9th Earl of Kinnoull (1710–1787)
- Robert Hay-Drummond, 10th Earl of Kinnoull (1751–1804)
- Thomas Hay-Drummond, 11th Earl of Kinnoull (1785–1866)
- George Hay-Drummond, 12th Earl of Kinnoull (1827–1897)
- Archibald Hay, 13th Earl of Kinnoull (1855–1916)
- George Hay, 14th Earl of Kinnoull (1902–1938)
- William Hay, 15th Earl of Kinnoull (1935–2013)
- Charles Hay, 16th Earl of Kinnoull (born 1962)
- James Hay, 1st Earl of Carlisle (1580–1636)
- James Hay, 2nd Earl of Carlisle (1612–1660)
- William Hay, 1st Earl of Erroll (died c. 1462)
- Nicholas Hay, 2nd Earl of Erroll (died 1470)
- William Hay, 3rd Earl of Erroll (died 1507)
- William Hay, 4th Earl of Erroll (died 1513)
- William Hay, 5th Earl of Erroll (died 1541)
- William Hay, 6th Earl of Erroll (c. 1521 – 1541)
- George Hay, 7th Earl of Erroll (died 1573)
- Andrew Hay, 8th Earl of Erroll (died 1585)
- Francis Hay, 9th Earl of Erroll (died 1615)
- William Hay, 10th Earl of Erroll (died 1636)
- Gilbert Hay, 11th Earl of Erroll (died 1675)
- John Hay, 12th Earl of Erroll (died 1704)
- Charles Hay, 13th Earl of Erroll (died 1717)
- Mary Hay, 14th Countess of Erroll (died 1758)
- James Hay, 15th Earl of Erroll (1726–1778)
- George Hay, 16th Earl of Erroll (1767–1798)
- William Hay, 17th Earl of Erroll (1772–1819)
- William George Hay, 18th Earl of Erroll (1801–1846)
- William Harry Hay, 19th Earl of Erroll (1823–1891)
- Charles Gore Hay, 20th Earl of Erroll (1852–1927)
- Victor Alexander Sereld Hay, 21st Earl of Erroll (1876–1928)
- Josslyn Victor Hay, 22nd Earl of Erroll (1901–1941)
- Diana Denyse Hay, 23rd Countess of Erroll (1926–1978)
- Merlin Sereld Victor Gilbert Moncreiffe, 24th Earl of Erroll (born 1948)

== See also ==
- Hay (disambiguation)
- Clan Hay
- Haye
- Hays (disambiguation)
- Hayes (surname)
- Haynes
- De la Hay (disambiguation)
