= William Hay =

William, Will, Willie, or Bill Hay may refer to:

== Arts and entertainment ==
- William Hay (architect) (1818–1888), Scottish architect
- William Delisle Hay (born 1853), British author
- William Hay (author) (1875–1945), Australian novelist and essayist
- Bill Hay (radio announcer) (1887–1978), American radio announcer
- Will Hay (1888–1949), English comedian and actor

== Law and politics ==
- William Hay (died 1664) (1594–1664), English politician
- William Hay (Seaford MP) (1695–1755), British MP for Seaford
- William Robert Hay (1761–1839), British barrister, cleric and magistrate
- William Hay (Australian politician) (1816–1908)
- Willie Hay, Baron Hay of Ballyore (born 1950), Northern Irish peer and Assemblyman

== Nobility ==
- William Hay, 1st Earl of Erroll (1423–1462), Scottish peer
- William Hay, 3rd Earl of Erroll (1449–1507), Scottish peer
- William Hay, 4th Earl of Erroll (1449–1513), Scottish peer and soldier
- William Hay, 5th Earl of Erroll (1495–1522), Scottish peer and statesman
- William Hay, 6th Earl of Erroll (1521–1541), Scottish peer
- William Hay, 6th Lord Hay of Yester (died 1591), Scottish nobleman and courtier
- William Hay, 10th Earl of Erroll (1590s–1636), Scottish nobleman
- William Hay, 4th Earl of Kinnoull (died 1677), Scottish peer
- William Hay, 6th Earl of Kinnoull (died 1709), Scottish peer
- William Hay, 17th Earl of Erroll (1772–1819), Scottish peer
- William Hay, 18th Earl of Erroll (1801–1846), Scottish peer
- William Hay, 19th Earl of Erroll (1823–1891), Scottish peer
- William Hay, 10th Marquess of Tweeddale (1826–1911), British politician, MP for Taunton and Haddington
- William Hay, 11th Marquess of Tweeddale (1884–1967), Scottish aristocrat, land owner and soldier
- William Hay, 15th Earl of Kinnoull (1935–2013), Scottish peer, surveyor and farmer

== Science and medicine ==
- William Howard Hay (1866–1940), American doctor, author, lecturer and dietician
- William Perry Hay (1872–1947), American zoologist
- William Walter Hay (1908–1998), American civil engineer and professor of railway engineering
- William W. Hay (1934–2022), American geologist and paleoclimatologist

== Sports ==
- William Hay (English cricketer) (1849–1925), English cricketer
- Arthur Hay (cricketer) (William Arthur Hay, 1873–1945), Australian Methodist minister and cricketer
- Bill Hay (footballer) (1934–2018), Australian footballer
- Bill Hay (field hockey) (born 1934), Singaporean Olympic hockey player
- Bill Hay (born 1935), Canadian ice hockey player
- Billy Hay (bowls) (1963–2015), Scottish lawn bowler

== Others ==
- William Hay (bishop) (1647–1707), Scottish bishop
- William Hay (police commissioner) (1794–1855), English police commissioner
- William H. Hay (1860–1946), United States Army officer
- Rupert Hay (William Rupert Hay, 1893–1962), British Indian Army officer and administrator

== See also ==
- William Haye (1948–2019), Jamaican cricketer
- William Hay Macnaghten (1793–1841), Anglo-Indian civil servant
- William Hays (disambiguation)
- William Hayes (disambiguation)
