= William Hayes =

William Hayes may refer to:

== In politics ==
- William Hayes (Irish politician), Irish Sinn Féin politician
- William Hayes (Canadian politician) (1879–1939), member of the Legislative Assembly of Alberta
- William D. Hayes (1884–1873), American public accountant and state auditor of Maine
- William P. Hayes (1866–1940), American lawyer and mayor of Springfield, Massachusetts
- Billy Hayes (trade unionist) (William Hayes, born 1953), British politician and leader of the Communication Workers' Union

== In sport ==
- William Hayes (American football) (born 1985), American football player
- William Hayes (Australian cricketer) (1883–1926), Australian cricketer
- William Hayes (New Zealand cricketer) (1890-1972), New Zealand cricketer
- William Hayes (diver) (born 1968), Canadian Olympic diver
- William Hayes (rugby league), rugby league footballer of the 1930s and 1940s
- William Hayes (wrestler) (1891–?), British wrestler
- Willie Hayes (basketball) (born 1967), American college basketball head coach
- Willie Hayes (1928–2014), Irish footballer
- Will Hayes (footballer, born 1995), horse trainer and former Australian rules footballer for Western Bulldogs and Carlton
- Will Hayes (footballer, born 2006), Australian rules footballer for Collingwood
- Bill Hayes (American football) (William Hayes, born 1943), former head coach at Winston-Salem State University and North Carolina A&T State University
- Bill Hayes (Australian footballer) (William Maurice Hayes, 1896–1969), Australian rules footballer
- Bill Hayes (baseball) (William Ernest Hayes, born 1957), catcher for the Chicago Cubs
- Bill Hayes (footballer, born 1915) (William Edward Hayes, 1915–1987), Irish footballer who played for Huddersfield Town, Cork United and Burnley
- Billy Hayes (footballer) (William Edward Hayes, 1895–?), English footballer who played as a goalkeeper

== Other people ==
- William Hayes (composer) (1708–1777), organist, conductor, writer
- William Hayes (geneticist) (1913–1994), Irish-born microbiologist and geneticist
- William Hayes (pastoralist) (1827–1913), Australian pastoralist
- William Hayes (photographer) (1871–1940), Victorian photographer in York, England
- William C. Hayes (1903–1963), American Egyptologist
- William Prine Hayes (1919–2009), Canadian commodore and educator
- William “Billy” Hayes (born 1947), convicted drug smuggler and co-author of Midnight Express
- William Q. Hayes (born 1956), U.S. federal judge
- William Hayes (academic) (1930–2025), president of St John's College, Oxford
- Billy Hayes (writer) (William Hayes, born 1947), American author of Midnight Express
- Bill Hayes (writer) (William Brooke Hayes, born 1961), American author of Insomniac City
- Bill Hayes (actor) (William Foster Hayes III, 1925–2024), American actor and singer
- Bully Hayes (William Henry Hayes, 1827/29–1877), American ship's captain and trader
- J. William Hayes (1921–1992), American entertainment lawyer

== See also ==
- William Haye (1948–2019), Jamaican cricketer
- Billy Hayes (disambiguation)
- William Hays (disambiguation)
- William Hay (disambiguation)
