= Billy Hayes =

Billy or Bill Hayes may refer to:

== In entertainment ==
- Bill Hayes (actor) (1925–2024), American actor and singer
- Bill Hayes (television producer), executive producer of Jon & Kate + 8
- Billy Hayes (musician) (born 1985), drummer in Wavves and formerly of Jay Reatard
- Billie Hayes (1924–2021), American television, film, and stage actress
- Bill Hays (director) (1938–2006), British television director

== In sport ==
- Bill Hayes (American football) (born 1943), former head coach at Winston-Salem State University and North Carolina A&T State University
- Bill Hayes (Australian footballer) (1896–1969), Australian rules footballer
- Bill Hayes (baseball) (born 1957), catcher for the Chicago Cubs
- Bill Hayes (footballer, born 1915) (1915–1987), Irish footballer who played for Huddersfield Town, Cork United and Burnley
- Billy Hayes (footballer) (1895–?), English footballer who played as a goalkeeper
- Billie Hayes (American football) (born 1947), American football player

== Other people ==
- Bill Hayes (politician) (born 1952), member of the Ohio House of Representatives
- Billy Hayes (trade unionist) (born 1953), leader of the Communication Workers' Union
- William “Billy” Hayes (born 1947), convicted drug smuggler and co-author of Midnight Express
- Bill Hayes (writer) (born 1961), author of Insomniac City
- Bill Hayes (pharmacist), Australian pharmacist

== See also ==
- William Hayes (disambiguation)
