= Margaret Hay =

Margaret Hay may refer to:

- Margaret Fordyce Dalrymple Hay (1889–1975), Australian librarian
- Lady Margaret Hay (1918–1975), British courtier
