= Delahaye (surname) =

Delahaye is a French surname. Notable people with the surname include:

- Angélique Delahaye (born 1963), French trade unionist and politician
- Charles Delahaye (ice hockey) (1905–1973), former Canadian ice hockey player
- Émile Delahaye (1843–1905), French automotive pioneer
- Ernest Delahaye (1853–1930), French writer
- Félix Delahaye (1767–1829), French gardener
- Gilbert Delahaye (1923–1997), Belgian author
- Hippolyte Delehaye (1859–1941), Belgian Jesuit hagiographic scholar
- Isaac Delahaye (born 1982), lead guitarist for symphonic metal band Epica
- Jacquotte Delahaye (fl. 1656), French female pirate in the Caribbean Sea
- Jean-Paul Delahaye (born 1952), French computer scientist and mathematician
- Laurent Delahaye (born 1977), French racing driver
- Luc Delahaye (born 1962), French photographer
- Rob Delahaye (born 1959), Dutch former professional footballer

== See also ==
- De la Haye (disambiguation)
- De la Hay (disambiguation)
- Hay (disambiguation)
- Hays (disambiguation)
- Hay (surname)
- Hayes (surname)
- Delahaye, automobile manufacturing company
- Clan Hay
