= William Hays =

William, Bill or Will Hays may refer to:

- William Hays (general) (1819–1875), American Civil War Union general
- William Hercules Hays (1820–1880), U.S. federal judge
- William Shakespeare Hays (1837–1907), American poet and lyricist
- William Torrance Hays (1837–1875), Ontario political figure
- William B. Hays (1844–1912), Mayor of Pittsburgh, Pennsylvania
- William Hays (painter) (1872-1934), American painter
- Will H. Hays (1879–1954), RNC chair, postmaster general, Hays Code film industry self-censorship advocate
- Bill Hays (director) (1938–2006), British director of stage and television
- William “Billy” Hayes (born 1947), convicted drug smuggler and co-author of Midnight Express

== See also ==
- William Hayes (disambiguation)
- William Hay (disambiguation)
