= Adam Hay =

Adam Hay may refer to:

- Sir Adam Hay, 7th Baronet (1795–1867), MP for Linlithgow Burghs 1826–30
- Adam Hay (Peeblesshire MP) (died 1775), MP for Peeblesshire 1767–68 and 1775

== See also ==
- Hay (surname)
