= William Douglas of Glenbervie =

Arms of the House Douglas of Glenbervie

Sir William Douglas of Glenbervie, Knt. (c. 1473 – 9 September 1513) was a Scottish nobleman, who fell at Flodden.

== Biography ==
Douglas was the second son of Archibald Douglas, 5th Earl of Angus, and his wife Elizabeth, daughter of Robert Boyd, 1st Lord Boyd. He obtained the lands of Glenbervie by his marriage and was thereafter styled Douglas of Glenbervie.

In 1493 and 1509 Douglas was in possession of charters of the lands of Grenane, in Ayrshire. The lands of Braidwood, in Lanarkshire, were confirmed to him in 1510.

William Douglas was knighted before 1511, and was slain on 9 September 1513 at the Battle of Flodden.

== Family ==
Douglas was pledged in marriage, by contract, in 1492, to Elizabeth, daughter and co-heir of the later James Auchinleck of that Ilk, by which contract he received a grant of the wardship of Auchinleck's estates. They had a son Sir Archibald Douglas of Glenbervie.

Elizabeth Douglas survived her husband and entered the convent of St. Catherine of Siena, on the Burgh Muir of Edinburgh. This convent was to give its name to the Sciennes area of the city.
