= Arthur Hay =

Arthur Hay may refer to:

- Arthur Hay, 9th Marquess of Tweeddale (1824–1878), Scottish soldier and ornithologist
- Arthur Hay (cricketer) (1873–1945), Australian clergyman and cricketer
- Arthur D. Hay (1884–1952), American attorney and judge in Oregon
