= Henry Hays =

Henry Hays may refer to:

- Henry Blake Hays (1829–1881), leader of the coal industry in Allegheny County, Pennsylvania
- Henry Francis Hays, KKK member
- Henry Hays, the son of the fictional detective Wayne Hays in True Detective season 3

== See also ==
- Harry Hays (disambiguation)
- Henry Hayes (disambiguation)
- Henry Hay (disambiguation)
