= De la Hay =

de la Hay is a Scoto-Norman surname. It may refer to:

- Gilbert de la Hay (died April 1333), fifth feudal baron of Errol in Gowrie
- Thomas de la Hay (c. 1342 – July 1406), Lord High Constable of Scotland

== See also ==
- Hay (surname)
- De la Haye (disambiguation)
- Delahaye (disambiguation)
