= Bonhard Castle =

Tower house in West Lothian, Scotland

Coordinates: 56.0010°N 3.5824°W

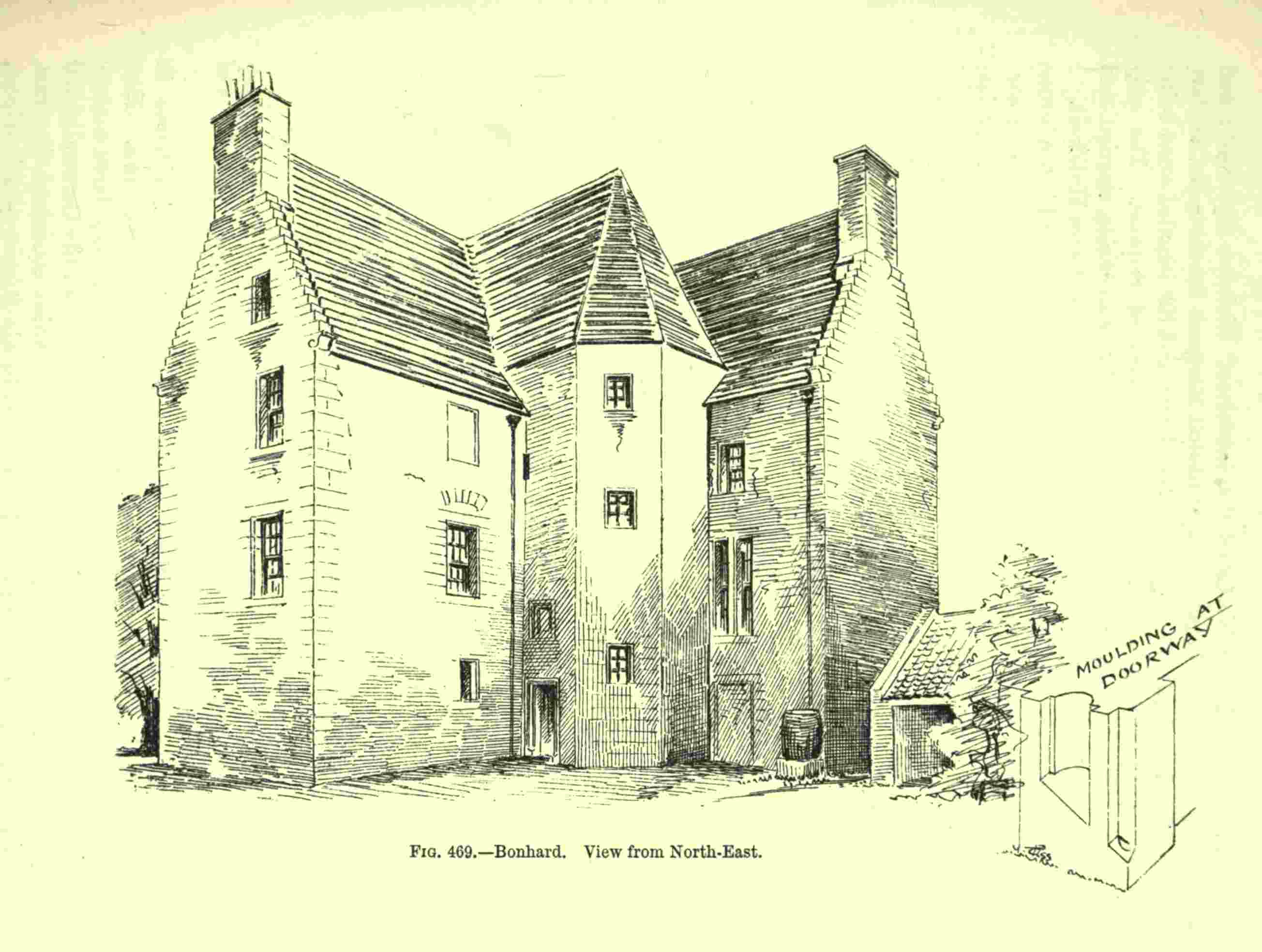
Drawing of Bonhard published in 1887

Bonhard Castle was an L-plan tower house, dating from the 16th century, around 1.5 miles (2.4 km) south east of Bo'ness, in West Lothian, Scotland. It was demolished in 1962.

Alternative names were Bonhard House, and Polkmyl Tower.

== History ==
The castle was owned by the Cornwalls of Bonhard. John Cornwall of Bonhard was killed at the battle of Flodden. Peter Cornwall of Bonhard built a house in Linlithgow which included a stone dated 1527 with his coat of arms. Nicholl Cornwall (1537–1607), younger of Bonhard, ignored a summons to fight during the Chaseabout Raid in 1565. Mary, Queen of Scots, gave his property to James Hamilton of Libberton.

Nicholl Cornwall's property was restored and in 1592 he was provost of Linlithgow. He first married Agnes Halkett, a sister of George Halkett, the Conservator of the Scottish Staple. His second wife was Mary Stewart, a niece of Walter Stewart of Blantyre. A dovecote at Bonhard included a 1591 datestone carved with the initials "NC-MS" and conjoint heraldry. However, the heraldry is thought be that of the Setons of Lough rather than Stewart, and may refer to a third marriage. The family motto used on the stone was "We Beig Ye See Warli" – We build, you see, warily.

Archibald Cornwall who worked for Edinburgh burgh council and was executed in 1601 is thought to have been a member of the Bonhard family.

Elizabeth Cornwall, Lady Dalmahoy, died at Bonhard in 1773. Subsequently, the castle was subdivided into farm-servant's dwellings, and altered internally. After it was burned out in 1959, it was blown up in 1962.

== Structure ==
The tower, which stood in a commanding position, had three storeys and a garret, with a semi-octagonal stair tower in the re-entrant angle. The original doorway was at the foot of the stair tower.

There was a kitchen in the unvaulted basement, while the hall was on the first floor; there was 17th-century plasterwork on that floor.

The site is now occupied by a new house.
