= Harry Hayes =

Harry Hayes or Hays may refer to:

- Harry Hayes (rugby league), Australian rugby league player
- Harry T. Hays (1820–1876), American army officer
- Harry Hays (1909–1982), Canadian politician
- Juan Enrique Hayes (1891–1976), Argentine footballer
- Enrique Ricardo Hayes, Argentine footballer and son of Juan Enrique Hayes

== See also ==
- Harry Hay (1912–2002), English-born American labor advocate
- Henry Hayes (disambiguation)
- Henry Hays (disambiguation)
- Harold Hayes (1926–1989), editor
- Harold Hays (born 1939), former American football linebacker
- Harry Heyes (born 1895), English footballer
