= Battle of Flodden =

1513 battle between England and Scotland

- Part of the War of the League of Cambrai
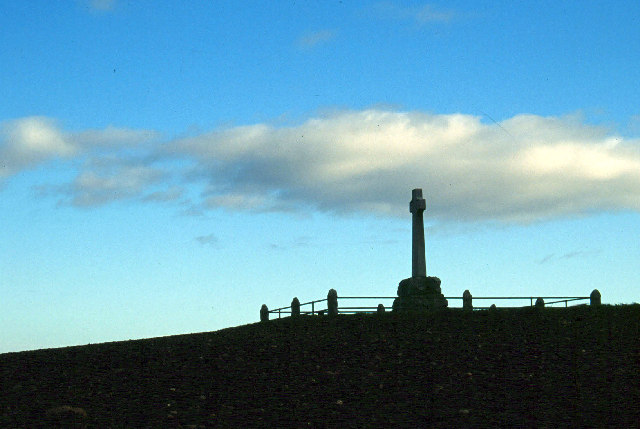
- The Flodden Memorial on Piper's Hill, overlooking the site of the battle
Date	9 September 1513
Location	Near Branxton, Northumberland, England 55°37′37″N 2°10′31″W
Result	English victory Accession of James V of Scotland

Belligerents
England	Scotland

Commanders and leaders
Queen Catherine; Earl of Surrey; Lord Thomas Howard; Lord Edmund Howard; Baron Dacre; Baron Monteagle	King James IV †; Lord Home; Earl of Montrose †; Earl of Bothwell †; Earl of Lennox †; Earl of Argyll †

Strength
20,000–30,000 men	30,000–40,000 men

Casualties and losses
1,500–1,700 killed	5,000–14,000 killed
- Location within England

The Battle of Flodden, Flodden Field, or occasionally Branxton or Brainston Moor was fought on 9 September 1513 between the Kingdom of England and the Kingdom of Scotland as part of the War of the League of Cambrai and resulted in an English victory. The battle was fought near Branxton, in the county of Northumberland, in northern England, between an invading Scots army under King James IV and an English army commanded by the Earl of Surrey. In terms of troop numbers, it was the largest battle ever fought between the two kingdoms.

After besieging and capturing several English border castles, James encamped his invading army on a commanding hilltop position at Flodden, awaited the English force that had been sent against him, and declined a challenge to fight in an open field. Surrey's army, therefore, carried out a circuitous march to position themselves in the rear of the Scottish camp. The Scots countered that by abandoning their camp and occupying the adjacent Branxton Hill and denying it to the English.

The battle began with an artillery duel followed by a downhill advance by Scottish infantry armed with pikes. Unknown to the Scots, an area of marshy land lay in their path, which broke up their formations. That gave the English troops the chance to bring about a close-quarter battle for which they were better equipped. James IV was killed in the fighting and became the last monarch from Great Britain to die in battle. That and the loss of a large proportion of the nobility led to a political crisis in Scotland.

British historians sometimes use the Battle of Flodden to mark the end of the Middle Ages in the British Isles; another candidate is the Battle of Bosworth Field in 1485.

== Background ==
Centuries of intermittent warfare between England and Scotland had been formally brought to an end by the Treaty of Perpetual Peace which James IV of Scotland and Henry VII of England signed in 1502. However, relations were soon soured by repeated cross-border raids, rivalry at sea leading to the death of the Scottish privateer Andrew Barton and the capture of his ships in 1511, and increasingly bellicose rhetoric by King Henry VIII of England in claiming to be the overlord of Scotland. Conflict began when James declared war on England to honour the Auld Alliance with France by diverting Henry's English troops from their campaign against King Louis XII of France. At this time, England was involved as a member of the "Catholic League" in the War of the League of Cambrai, defending Italy and the pope from the French, a part of the Italian Wars.

Pope Leo X, already a signatory to the anti-French Treaty of Mechlin, sent a letter to James threatening him with ecclesiastical censure for breaking his peace treaties with England on 28 June 1513, and subsequently James was excommunicated by Cardinal Christopher Bainbridge. James also summoned sailors and sent the Scottish navy, including the Great Michael, to join the ships of Louis XII of France. The fleet of twenty-two vessels commanded by James Hamilton, 1st Earl of Arran, departed from the Firth of Forth on 25 July accompanied by James as far as the Isle of May, intending to pass around the north of Scotland and create a diversion in Ireland before joining the French at Brest, from where it might cut the English line of communication across the English Channel. However, the fleet was so badly delayed that it played no part in the war; James had sent most of his experienced artillerymen with the expedition, a decision which was to have unforeseen consequences for his land campaign.

Henry was in France with Emperor Maximilian I at the siege of Thérouanne. The Scottish Lyon King of Arms brought James IV's letter of 26 July to him. James asked him to desist from attacking France in breach of their treaty. Henry's exchange with Islay Herald or the Lyon King on 11 August at his tent at the siege was recorded. The Herald declared that Henry should abandon his efforts against the town and go home. Angered, Henry said that James had no right to summon him, and ought to be England's ally, as James was married to his (Henry's) sister, Margaret. He declared:

And now, for a conclusion, recommend me to your master and tell him if he be so hardy to invade my realm or cause to enter one foot of my ground I shall make him as weary of his part as ever was man that began any such business. And one thing I ensure him by the faith that I have to the Crown of England and by the word of a King, there shall never King nor Prince make peace with me that ever his part shall be in it. Moreover, fellow, I care for nothing but for misentreating of my sister, that would God she were in England on a condition she cost the Schottes King not a penny.

Henry also replied by letter on 12 August, writing that James was mistaken and that any of his attempts on England would be resisted. Using the pretext of revenge for the murder of Robert Kerr, a Warden of the Scottish East March who had been killed by John "The Bastard" Heron in 1508, James invaded England with an army of about 30,000 men. However, both sides had been making lengthy preparations for this conflict. Henry VIII had already organised an army and artillery in the north of England to counter the expected invasion. Some of the guns had been returned to use against the Scots by Margaret of Austria, Duchess of Savoy. A year earlier, Thomas Howard, Earl of Surrey, had been appointed Lieutenant-General of the army of the north and was issued with banners of the Cross of St George and the Red Dragon of Wales. Only a small number of the light horsemen of the Scottish border had been sent to France. A northern army was maintained with artillery and its expense account started on 21 July. The first captains were recruited in Lambeth. Many of these soldiers wore green and white Tudor colours. Surrey marched to Doncaster in July and then Pontefract, where he assembled more troops from northern England.

=== "Ill Raid" ===
On 5 August, a force estimated at up to 7,000 Scottish border reivers commanded by Lord Home, crossed into Northumberland and began to pillage farms and villages, taking anything of value before burning the houses. Surrey had taken the precaution of sending Sir William Bulmer north with 200 mounted archers, which Bulmer augmented with locally levied men to create a force approaching 1,000 in strength. On 13 August, they prepared an ambush for the Scots as they returned north laden with the spoils of their looting, by hiding in the broom bushes that grew shoulder-high on Milfield Plain. Surprising the Scots with a sudden volley of arrows, the English killed as many as 600 of the Scots before they were able to escape, leaving their booty and the Home family banner behind them. Although the "Ill Raid" had little effect on the forthcoming campaign, it may have influenced James's decision not to fight an open battle against Surrey on the same ground. Whether the raid was undertaken solely on Lord Home's initiative, or whether it had been authorised by James is unknown.

== Invasion ==
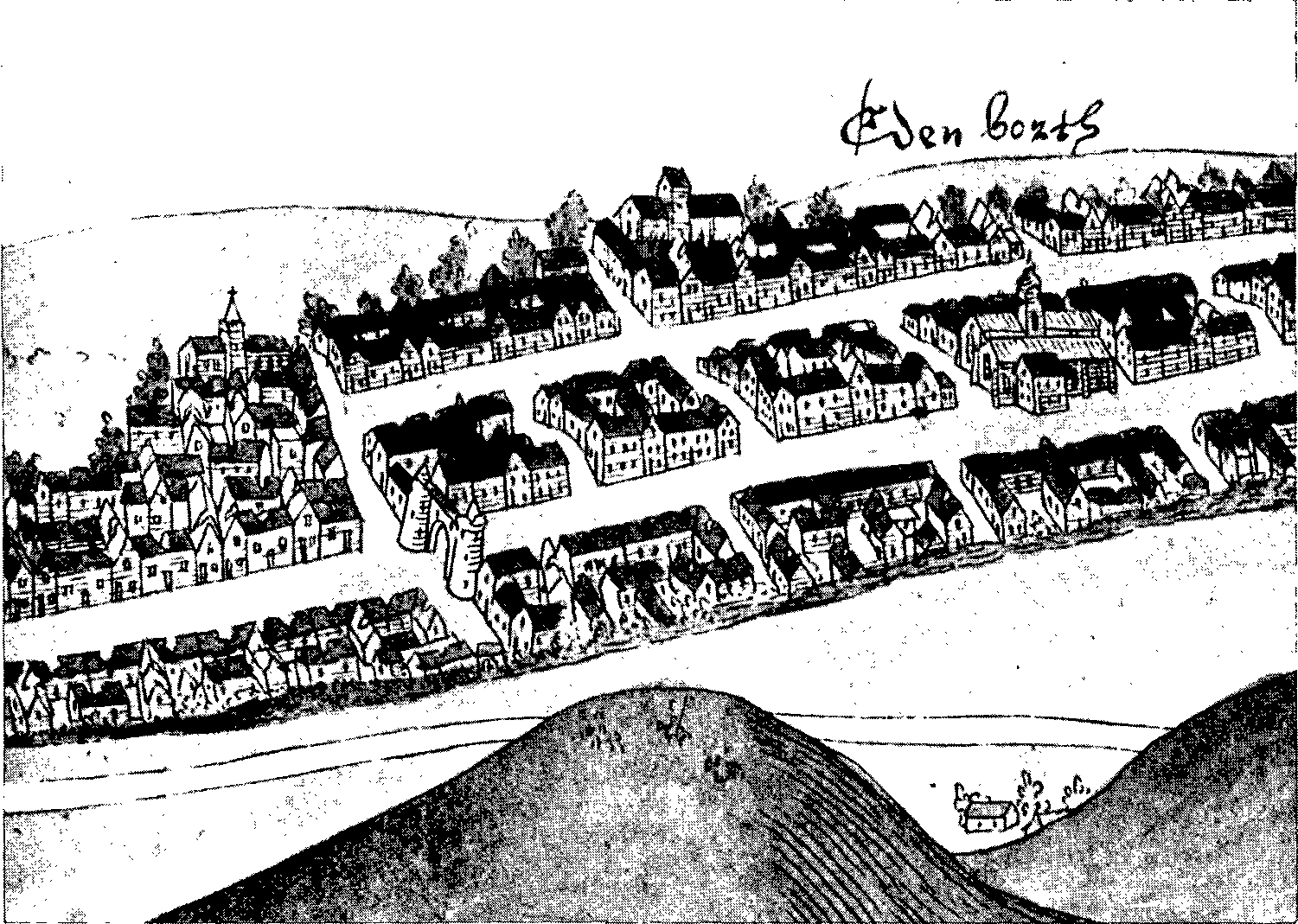
Sketch of Edinburgh in 1544 looking south, detail showing the Netherbow Port

On 18 August, five cannons brought down from Edinburgh Castle to the Netherbow Port at St Mary's Wynd for the invasion set off towards England dragged by borrowed oxen. On 19 August two gross culverins, four culverins pickmoyance and six (mid-sized) culverins moyane followed with the gunner Robert Borthwick and master carpenter John Drummond. The king himself set off that night with two hastily prepared standards of St Margaret and St Andrew.

The queen, Catherine of Aragon, was regent in England. On 27 August, she issued warrants for the property of all Scotsmen in England to be seized. On hearing of the invasion on 3 September, she ordered Thomas Lovell to raise an army in the Midland counties. She prepared banners for an army, including her heraldry, in case she herself was called north.

In keeping with his understanding of the medieval code of chivalry, King James sent notice to the English, one month in advance, of his intent to invade. This gave the English time to gather an army. After a muster on the Burgh Muir of Edinburgh, the Scottish host moved to Ellemford, to the north of Duns, Scottish Borders, and camped to wait for Angus and Home. The Scottish army, numbering some 42,000 men, crossed the River Tweed into England near Coldstream; the exact date of the crossing is not recorded, but is generally accepted to have been 22 August. The Scottish troops were unpaid and were only required by feudal obligation to serve for forty days. Once across the border, a detachment turned south to attack Wark on Tweed Castle, while the bulk of the army followed the course of the Tweed downstream to the northeast to invest the remaining border castles.

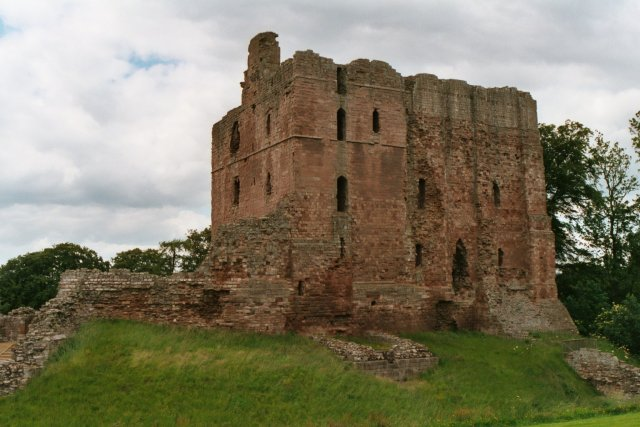
Norham Castle, which fell to the Scots on 29 August after a six-day bombardment by James's artillery.

On 24 August, James IV held a council or parliament at Twiselhaugh and made a proclamation for the benefit of the heirs of anyone killed during this invasion. By 29 August after a siege of six days, Bishop Thomas Ruthall's Norham Castle was taken and partly demolished after the Scottish heavy artillery had breached the recently refurbished outer walls. The Scots then moved south, capturing the castles of Etal and Ford.

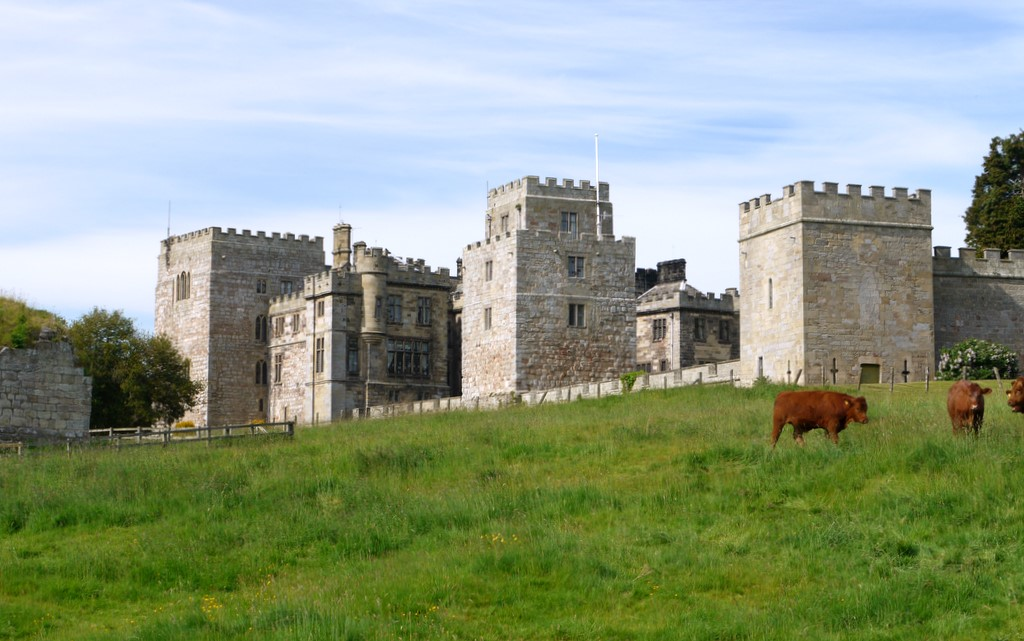
James IV captured Ford Castle from Lady Heron

A later Scottish chronicle writer, Robert Lindsay of Pitscottie, tells the story that James wasted valuable time at Ford enjoying the company of Elizabeth, Lady Heron and her daughter. Edward Hall says that Lady Heron was a prisoner (in Scotland), and negotiated with James IV and the Earl of Surrey her own release and that Ford Castle would not be demolished for an exchange of prisoners. The English herald, Rouge Croix, came to Ford to appoint a place for battle on 4 September, with extra instructions that any Scottish heralds who were sent to Surrey were to be met where they could not view the English forces. Raphael Holinshed's story is that a part of the Scottish army returned to Scotland, and the rest stayed at Ford waiting for Norham to surrender and debating their next move. James IV wanted to fight and considered moving to assault Berwick-upon-Tweed, but the Earl of Angus spoke against this and said that Scotland had done enough for France. James sent Angus home, and according to Holinshed, the Earl burst into tears and left, leaving his two sons, the Master of Angus and Glenbervie, with most of the Douglas kindred to fight.

In the meantime, Surrey was reluctant to commit his army too early, since once in the field they had to be paid and fed at enormous expense. From his encampment at Pontefract, he issued an order for forces raised in the northern counties to assemble at Newcastle on Tyne on 1 September. Surrey had 500 soldiers with him and was to be joined at Newcastle by 1,000 experienced soldiers and sailors with their artillery, who would arrive by sea under the command of Surrey's son, also called Thomas Howard, the Lord High Admiral of England. By 28 August, Surrey had arrived at Durham Cathedral where he was presented with the banner of Saint Cuthbert, which had been carried by the English in victories against the Scots in 1138 and 1346. On 3 September, Surrey moved his advanced guard to Alnwick while he awaited the completion of the muster and the arrival of the Lord Admiral whose ships had been delayed by storms.

=== Surrey's challenge ===
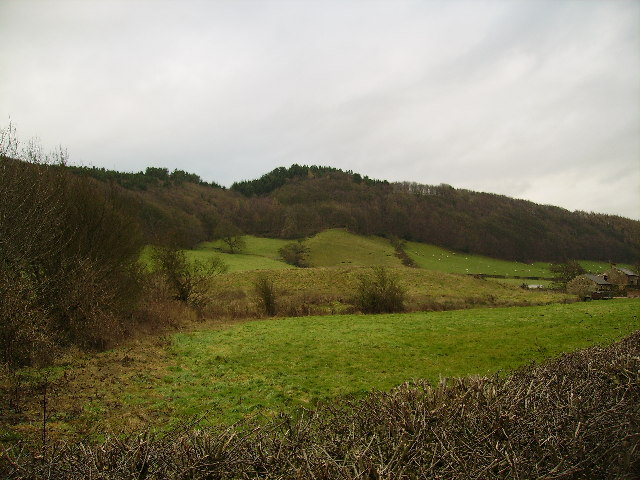
A view of Flodden Hill which shows its steep gradient. The crest of the hill was without trees at the time of the battle.

On Sunday 4 September, James and the Scottish army had taken up a position at Flodden Edge, a hill to the south of Branxton. This was an immensely strong natural feature since the flanks were protected by marshes on one side and steep slopes on the other, leaving only a direct approach. The amount of fortification which James constructed on the hill is disputed; several antiquaries had mapped supposed ramparts and bastions there over the centuries, but excavations conducted between 2009 and 2015 found no trace of 16th century work and concluded that James may have reused some features of an Iron Age hill fort.

The Earl of Surrey, writing at Wooler Haugh on Wednesday 7 September, compared the Scottish position to a fortress in a challenge sent to James IV by his herald, Thomas Hawley, the Rouge Croix Pursuivant. Surrey complained that James had sent his Islay Herald, agreeing that they would join in battle on Friday between 12 noon and 3 pm, and asked that James would face him on the plain at Milfield as appointed. James had no intention of leaving his carefully prepared position, perhaps recalling the fate of the Ill Raid on the same plain; he replied to Surrey that it was "not fitting for an Earl to seek to command a King". This put Surrey in a difficult position; the choice was to make a frontal attack on Flodden Edge, uphill in the face of the Scottish guns in their prepared position and in all probability be defeated, or to refuse battle, earning disgrace and the anger of King Henry. Waiting for James to make a move was not an option because his 20,000–26,000 strong army desperately needed resupply, the convoy of wagons bringing food and beer for the troops from Newcastle having been ambushed and looted by local Englishmen. During a council of war on Wednesday evening, an ingenious alternative plan was devised, advised by "the Bastard" Heron, who had intimate local knowledge and had recently arrived at the English camp.

== Battle ==
=== Initial manoeuvres ===
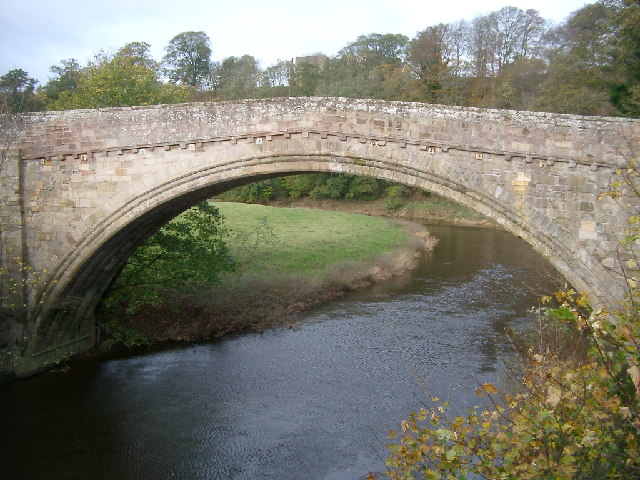
Twizell (or Twizel) Bridge, which allowed the English artillery to cross the River Till and outflank the Scottish Army.

On Thursday, 8 September, Surrey moved his army from Wooler Haugh and instead of heading northwest towards Flodden, he turned east across the River Till. From there, the English picked up the old Roman road known as the Devil's Causeway and headed north, making camp at Barmoor, near Lowick. James may have assumed that Surrey was heading for Berwick-upon-Tweed for resupply, but he was actually intending to outflank the Scots and either attack or blockade them from the rear. At 5 am on the morning of Friday, 9 September, after a damp night on short rations and having to drink water from streams because the beer had run out, Surrey's men set off westwards to complete their manoeuvre. Their objective was Branxton Hill, lying less than two miles (three kilometres) north of James's camp at Flodden. To re-cross the River Till, the English army split into two; one force under Surrey crossed several fords near Heaton Castle, while a larger vanguard numbering some 15,000 commanded by the Lord Admiral and including the artillery train, crossed at Twizell Bridge downstream.

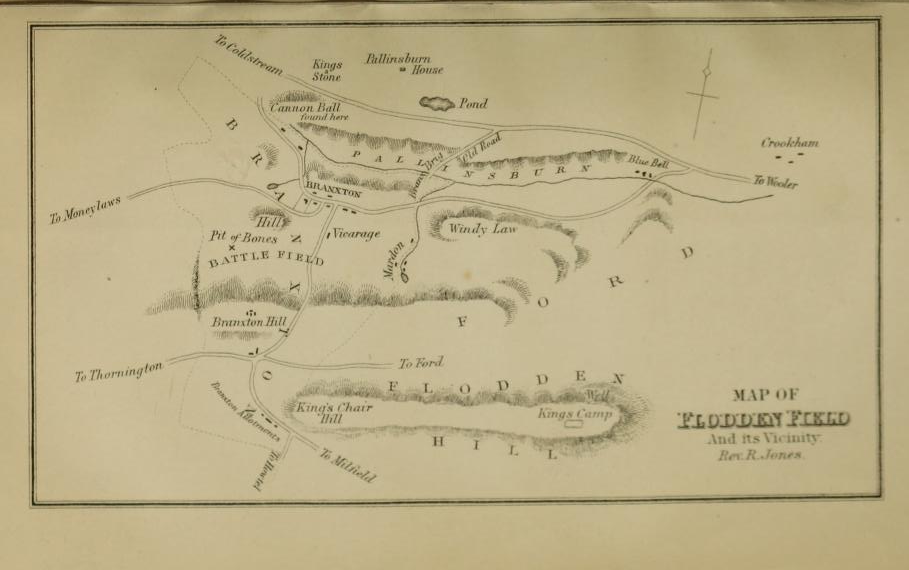
A map published in 1859, showing the features of the battlefield at Flodden.

Pitscottie says the vanguard crossed the bridge at 11 am and that James would not allow the Scots artillery to fire on the vulnerable English during this manoeuvre. This is not credible, since the bridge is some 6 miles (9.7 km) distant from Flodden, but James's scouts must have reported their approach. James quickly saw the threat and ordered his army to break camp and move to Branxton Hill, a commanding position which would deny the feature to the English and still give his pike formations the advantage of a downhill attack if the opportunity arose. The disadvantage was that the Scots were moving onto ground that had not been reconnoitered. The Lord Admiral, arriving with his vanguard at Branxton village, was unaware of the new Scottish position which was obscured by smoke from burning rubbish; when he finally caught sight of the Scottish army arrayed on Branxton Hill, he sent a messenger to his father urging him to hurry and also sending his Agnus Dei pendant to underline the gravity of his situation. In the meantime, he positioned his troops on the dead ground from where he hoped that the Scots could not assess the size of his force. James declined to attack the vulnerable vanguard, reportedly saying that he was "determined to have them all in front of me on one plain field and see what all of them can do against me".

=== Opposing forces ===
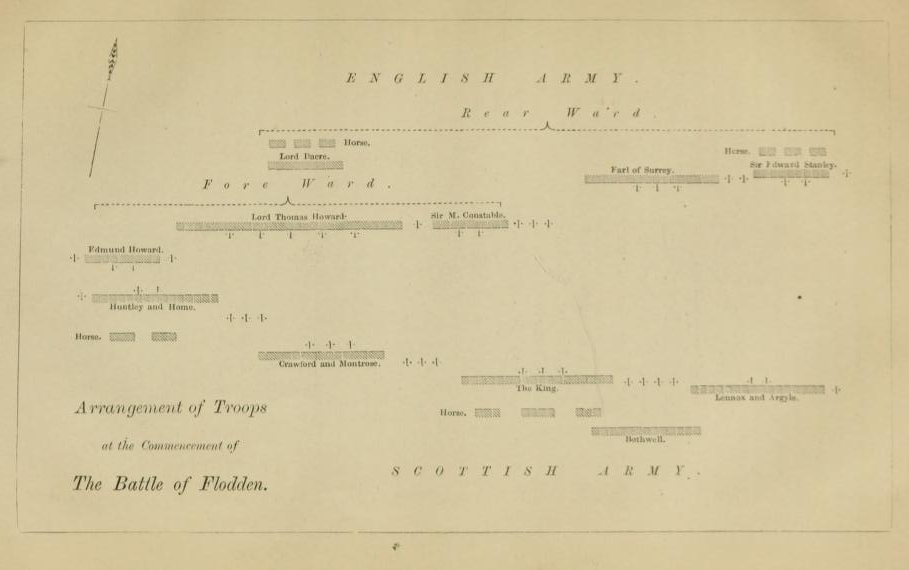
A diagram published in 1859, showing the arrangement of opposing forces at the Battle of Flodden. An error is that Edward Stanley's force is shown incorporated into the left of the English line, when in fact he arrived on the Scottish flank late in the battle.

James' army, somewhat reduced from the original 42,000 by sickness and desertion, still amounted to about 34,000, outnumbering the English force by 8,000. The Scottish army was organised into four divisions or battles. That on the left wing was commanded by the Lord Home and the Earl of Huntly and consisted of a combination of Borderers and Highlanders. Next in the line was the battle commanded by the Earls of Erroll, Crawford and Montrose composed of men from the northeast of Scotland. The third was commanded by James himself together with his son Alexander and the Earls of Cassillis, Rothes and Caithness. On the right, the Earls of Argyll and Lennox commanded a force drawn from the Highlands and Islands. Some sources state that there was a fifth battle acting as a reserve, perhaps commanded by the Earl of Bothwell. The Scottish infantry had been equipped with 18 feet (5.5 m) long pikes by their French allies; a new weapon which had proved devastating in continental Europe, but required training, discipline and suitable terrain to use effectively. The Scottish artillery, consisting mainly of heavy siege guns, included five great curtals and two great culverins (known as "the Seven Sisters"), together with four sakers, and six great serpentines. These modern weapons fired an iron ball weighing up to 66 pounds (30 kg) to a range of 2,000 yards (1,800 m). However, the heaviest of these required a team of 36 oxen to move each one and were only able to fire once every twenty minutes at the most. They were commanded by the king's secretary, Patrick Paniter, an able diplomat, but who had no artillery experience.

Upon Surrey's arrival, he deployed his troops on the forward slope of Piper Hill to match the Scottish dispositions. On his right, facing Hume and Huntly, was a battle composed of men from Cheshire, Lancashire and Yorkshire, commanded by Surrey's third son, Lord Edmund Howard. Of the central battles, one was commanded by the Lord Admiral and the other by Surrey himself. Sir Edward Stanley's force of cavalry and archers had been the last to leave Barmoor and would not arrive on the left flank until later in the day. A reserve of mounted Borderers commanded by Thomas, Baron Dacre were positioned to the rear. The English infantry was equipped with traditional polearms, mostly bills which were their favoured weapon. There was also a large contingent of well-trained archers armed with the English longbow. The English artillery consisted of light field guns of rather old-fashioned design, typically firing a ball of only about 1 pound (0.45 kg), but they were easily handled and capable of rapid fire.

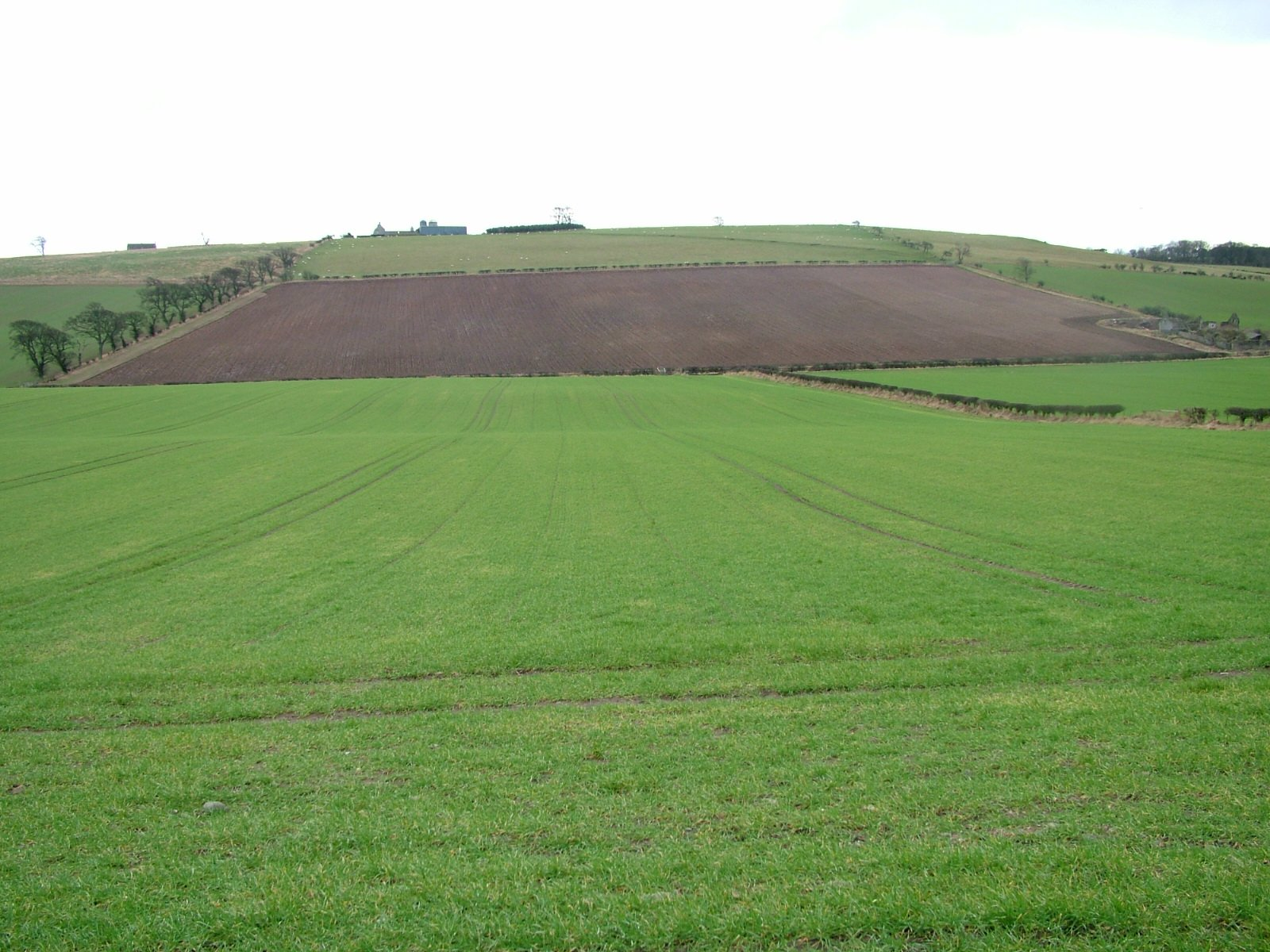
The western side of the battlefield, looking south-south-east from the monument erected in 1910, towards Branxton Hill on the skyline. The Scottish army advanced down the ploughed field, the English down the grassy field in the foreground. The modern boundary between the two fields marks the position of the marsh encountered by the Scots.

=== Engagement ===
At about 4 pm on Friday in wet and windy weather, James began the battle with an artillery duel, but his big guns did not perform as well as he had hoped. Contemporary accounts put this down to the difficulty for the Scots of shooting downhill, but another factor must have been that their guns had been poorly sited instead of being carefully emplaced, which was usually required for such heavy weapons, further slowing their ponderous rate of fire. This may explain English claims that the Scottish guns were destroyed by return fire, when in fact they were captured undamaged after the battle. The apparent silence of the Scottish artillery allowed the light English guns to turn a rapid fire on the massed ranks of infantry, although the effectiveness of this bombardment is difficult to assess.

The next phase started when Home and Huntly's battle on the Scottish left advanced downhill towards the opposite troops commanded by Edmund Howard. They advanced, according to the English, "in good order, after the Alamayns [i.e. German] manner, without speaking a word". The Scots had placed their most heavily armoured men in the front rank so that the English archers had little impact. The outnumbered English battle was forced back and elements of it began to run off. Surrey saved his son from disaster by ordering the intervention of Dacre's light horsemen, who were able to approach unobserved in the dead ground that had been exploited earlier by the vanguard. The eventual result was a stalemate in which both sides stood off from each other and played no further part in the battle. According to later accounts, when Huntly suggested that they rejoin the fighting, Home replied: "the man does well this day who saves himself: we fought those who were opposed to us and beat them; let our other companies do the same!".

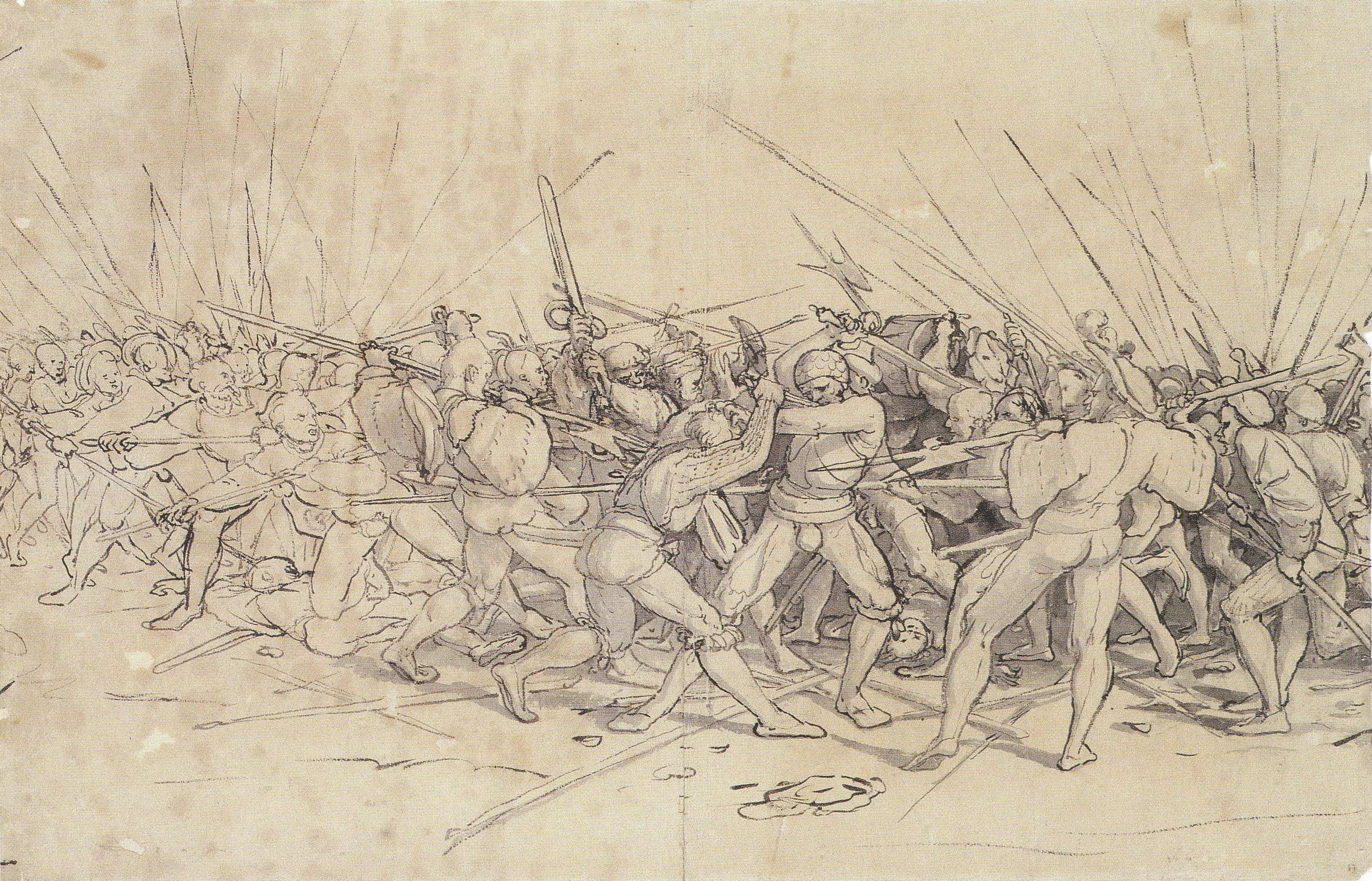
An early 16th century depiction of pikemen in close combat with halberdiers; the fighting at Flodden must have had a similar appearance.

In the meantime, James had observed Home and Huntly's initial success and ordered the advance of the next battle in line, commanded by Errol, Crawford and Montrose. At the foot of Branxton Hill, they encountered an unforeseen obstacle, an area of marshy ground, identified by modern hydrologists as a groundwater seepage zone, made worse by days of heavy rain. As they struggled to cross the waterlogged ground, the Scots lost the cohesion and momentum on which pike formations depended for success. Once the line was disrupted, the long pikes became an unwieldy encumbrance, and the Scots began to drop them "so that it seemed as if a wood were falling down" according to a later English poem. Reaching for their side-arms of swords and axes, they found themselves outreached by the English bills in the close-quarter fighting that developed.

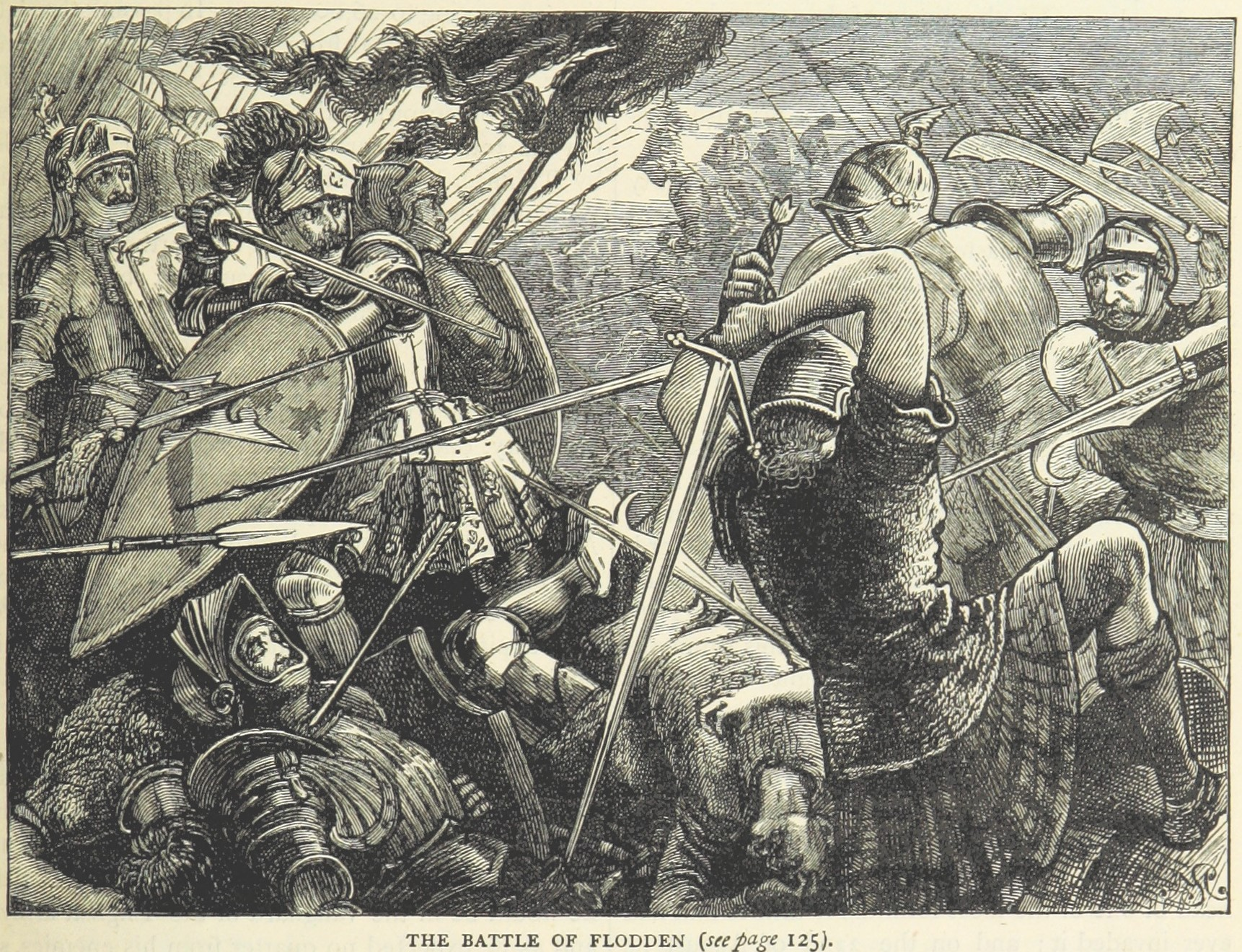
An 1873 artist's impression of the hand-to-hand fighting at the height of the battle.

It is unclear whether James had seen the difficulty encountered by the battle of the three earls, but he followed them down the slope regardless, making for Surrey's formation. James has been criticised for placing himself in the front line, thereby putting himself in personal danger and losing his overview of the field. He was, however, well-known for taking risks in battle and it would have been out of character for him to stay back. Encountering the same difficulties as the previous attack, James's men nevertheless fought their way to Surrey's bodyguard but no further. The final uncommitted Scottish formation, Argyll and Lennox's Highlanders held back, perhaps awaiting orders. The last English formation to engage was Stanley's force which, after following a circuitous route from Barmoor, finally arrived on the right of the Scottish line. They loosed volleys of arrows into Argyll and Lennox's battle, whose men lacked armour or any other effective defence against the archers. After suffering heavy casualties the Highlanders scattered.

The fierce fighting continued, centred on the contest between Surrey and James. As other English formations overcame the Scottish forces they had initially engaged, they moved to reinforce their leader. An instruction to English troops that no prisoners were to be taken explains the exceptional mortality amongst the Scottish nobility. James himself was killed in the final stage of the battle; his body was found surrounded by the corpses of his bodyguard of the Archers' Guard, recruited from the Forest of Ettrick and known as "the Flowers of the Forest". Despite having the finest armour available, the king's corpse was found to have two arrow wounds, one in the jaw, and wounds from bladed weapons to the neck and wrist. He was the last monarch to die in battle in the British Isles. Home, Huntly and his troops were the only formation to escape intact; others escaped in small groups, closely pursued by the English.

== Tactics and aftermath ==
Soon after the battle, the council of Scotland decided to send for help from Christian II of Denmark. The Scottish ambassador, Andrew Brounhill, was given instructions to explain "how this cais is hapnit." Brounhill's instructions blame James IV for moving down the hill to attack the English on marshy ground from a favourable position, and credits the victory to Scottish inexperience rather than English valour. The letter also mentions that the Scots placed their officers in the front line in medieval style, where they were vulnerable, contrasting this loss of the nobility with the English great men who took their stand with the reserves and at the rear. The English generals stayed behind the lines in the Renaissance style. The loss of so many Scottish officers meant there was no one to coordinate a retreat.

However, according to contemporary English reports, Thomas Howard marched on foot leading the English vanguard to the foot of the hill. Howard was moved to dismount and do this by taunts of cowardice sent by James IV's heralds, apparently based on his role at sea and the death two years earlier of the Scottish naval officer Sir Andrew Barton. A version of Howard's declaration to James IV that he would lead the vanguard and take no prisoners was included in later English chronicle accounts of the battle. Howard claimed his presence in "proper person" at the front was his trial by combat for Barton's death.

=== Weaponry ===
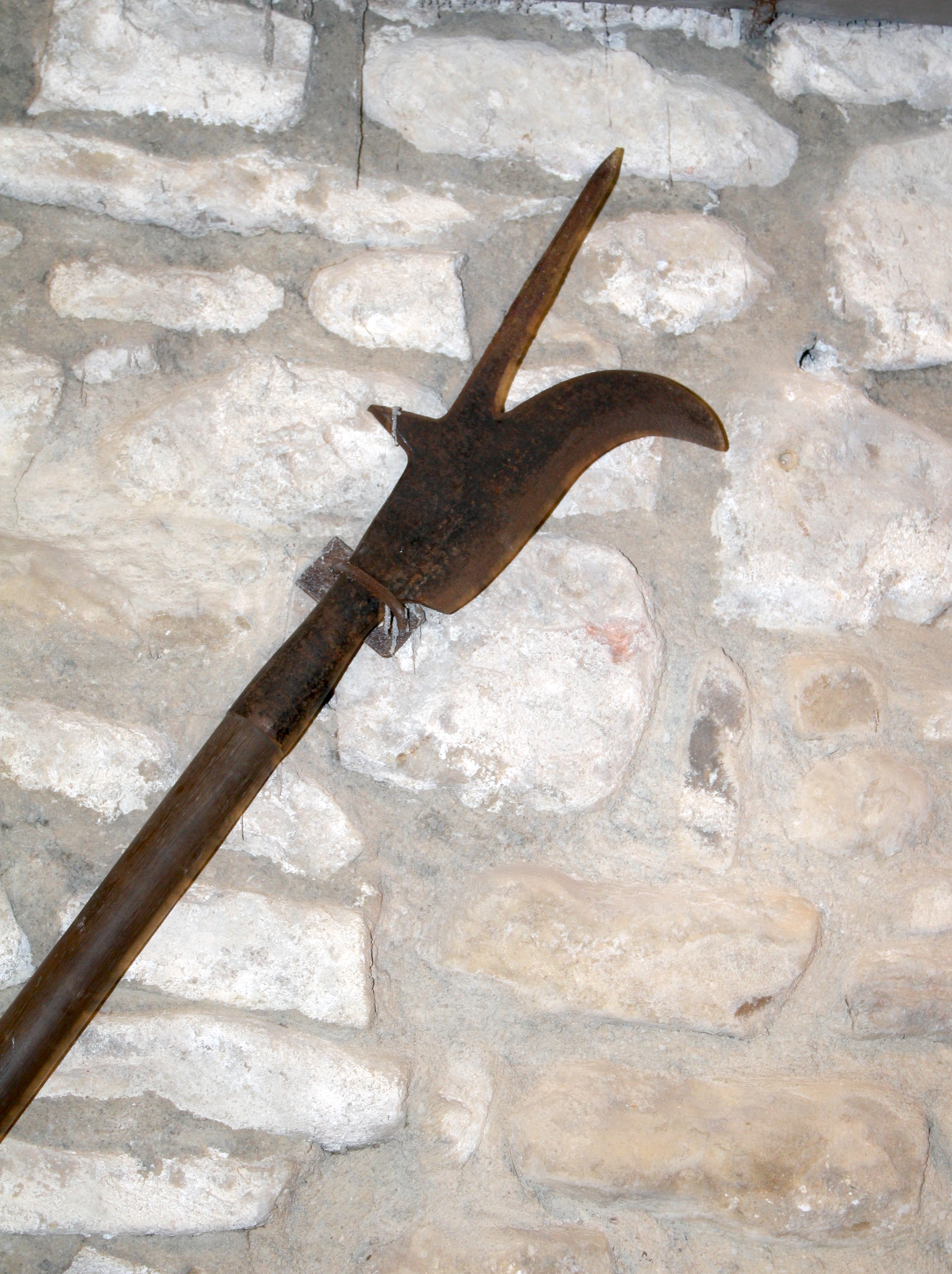
English bill, reputed to have been used at Flodden.

Flodden was essentially a victory of the bill used by the English over the pike used by the Scots. The pike was an effective weapon only in a battle of movement, especially to withstand a cavalry charge. The Scottish pikes were described by the author of the Trewe Encounter as "keen and sharp spears 5 yards long". Although the pike had become a Swiss weapon of choice and represented modern warfare, the hilly terrain of Northumberland, the nature of the combat, and the slippery footing did not allow it to be employed to the best effect. Bishop Ruthall reported to Thomas Wolsey, 'the bills disappointed the Scots of their long spears, on which they relied.' The infantrymen at Flodden, both Scots and English, had fought essentially like their ancestors, and Flodden has been described as the last great medieval battle in the British Isles. This was the last time that bill and pike would come together as equals in battle. Two years later Francis I of France defeated the Swiss pikemen at the Battle of Marignano, using a combination of heavy cavalry and artillery, ushering in a new era in the history of war. An official English diplomatic report issued by Brian Tuke noted the Scots' iron spears and their initial "very good order after the German fashion", but concluded that "the English halberdiers decided the whole affair, so that in the battle the bows and ordnance were of little use."

Despite Tuke's comment (he was not present), this battle was one of the first major engagements in the British Isles where artillery was significantly deployed. John Lesley, writing sixty years later, noted that the Scottish bullets flew over the English heads while the English cannon was effective: the one army placed so high and the other so low.

The Scots' advance down the hill was resisted by a hail of arrows, an incident celebrated in later English ballads. Hall says that the armoured front line was mostly unaffected; this is confirmed by the ballads which note that some few Scots were wounded in the scalp and, wrote Hall, James IV sustained a significant arrow wound. Many of the archers were recruited from Lancashire and Cheshire. Sir Richard Assheton raised one such company from Middleton, near Manchester. He rebuilt his parish church St. Leonard's, Middleton, which contains the unique "Flodden Window." It depicts and names the archers and their priest in stained glass. The window has been called the oldest known war memorial in the UK. The success of the Cheshire yeomanry, under the command of Richard Cholmeley, led to his later appointment as Lieutenant of the Tower of London.

=== Honours ===
Thomas Howard, 2nd Duke of Norfolk was given an augmentation of honour to commemorate the Battle of Flodden

As a reward for his victory, Thomas Howard was subsequently restored to the title of Duke of Norfolk, lost by his father's support for Richard III. The arms of the Dukes of Norfolk still carry an augmentation of honour awarded on account of their ancestor's victory at Flodden, a modified version of the Royal coat of arms of Scotland with the lower half of the lion removed and an arrow through the lion's mouth.

At Framlingham Castle the Duke kept two silver-gilt cups engraved with the arms of James IV, which he bequeathed to Cardinal Wolsey in 1524. The Duke's descendants presented the College of Arms with a sword, a dagger and a turquoise ring in 1681. The family tradition was either that these items belonged to James IV or were arms carried by Thomas Howard at Flodden. The sword blade is signed by the maker Maestre Domingo of Toledo. There is some doubt whether the weapons are of the correct period. The Earl of Arundel was painted by Philip Fruytiers, following Anthony van Dyck's 1639 composition, with his ancestor's sword, gauntlet and helm from Flodden. Thomas Lord Darcy retrieved a powder flask belonging to James IV and gave it to Henry VIII. A cross with rubies and sapphires with a gold chain worn by James and a hexagonal table salt with the figure of St Andrews on the lid were given to Henry by James Stanley, Bishop of Ely.

=== Legends of a lost king ===
Lord Dacre discovered the body of James IV on the battlefield. He later wrote that the Scots "love me worst of any Englishman living, by reason that I fande the body of the King of Scots." The chronicle writer John Stow gave a location for the king's death; "Pipard's Hill," now unknown, which may have been the small hill on Branxton Ridge overlooking Branxton church. Dacre took the body to Berwick-upon-Tweed, where according to Hall's Chronicle, it was viewed by the captured Scottish courtiers William Scott and John Forman who acknowledged it was the king's. (Forman, the king's sergeant-porter, had been captured by Richard Assheton of Middleton.) The body was then embalmed and taken to Newcastle upon Tyne. From York, a city that James had promised to capture before Michaelmas, the body was brought to Sheen Priory near London. A payment of £12-9s-10d was made for the "sertying ledying and sawdryng of the ded course of the King of Scottes" and carrying it York and to Windsor.

James's banner, sword and his cuisses (thigh-armour) were taken to the shrine of Saint Cuthbert at Durham Cathedral. Much of the armour of the Scottish casualties was sold on the field, and 350 suits of armour were taken to Nottingham Castle. A list of horses taken at the field runs to 24 pages.

Thomas Hawley, the Rouge Croix pursuivant, was first with news of the victory. He brought the "rent surcoat of the King of Scots stained with blood" to Catherine of Aragon at Woburn Abbey. She sent news of the victory to Henry VIII at Tournai with Hawley, and then sent John Glyn on 16 September with James's coat (and iron gauntlets) and a detailed account of the battle written by Lord Howard. Brian Tuke mentioned in his letter to Cardinal Bainbridge that the coat was lacerated and chequered with blood. Catherine suggested Henry should use the coat as his battle-banner, and wrote she had thought to send him the body too, as Henry had sent her the Duke of Longueville, his prisoner from Thérouanne, but "Englishmen's hearts would not suffer it."

In addition to these relics, the gold crucifix worn by James IV on the field of battle, set with three balas rubies and three sapphires and containing a fragment of the True Cross, was listed in the jewel book inventory of Henry VIII in the chapel of the Tower of London.

Soon after the battle, there were legends that James IV had survived. A Scottish merchant at Tournai in October claimed to have spoken with him, and Lindsay of Pitscottie records two myths: "thair cam four great men upon hors, and every ane of thame had ane wisp upoun thair spear headis, quhairby they might know one another and brought the king furth of the feild, upoun ane dun hackney," and also that the king escaped from the field but was killed between Duns and Kelso. Similarly, John Lesley adds that the body taken to England was "my lord Bonhard" and James was seen in Kelso after the battle and then went secretly on pilgrimage in far nations. George Buchanan reported a rumour that James IV had escaped the field, leaving his Squire of Attendance, Alexander Elphinstone, 1st Lord Elphinstone to fight on, and that the English may have mistaken Elphinstone's body for the king.

A legend arose that James had been warned against invading England by supernatural powers. While he was praying in St Michael's Kirk at Linlithgow, a man strangely dressed in blue had approached his desk saying his mother had told him to say James should not go to war or take the advice of women. Then before the king could reply, the man vanished. David Lindsay of the Mount and John Inglis could find no trace of him. The historian R. L. Mackie wondered if the incident really happened as a masquerade orchestrated by an anti-war party: Norman Macdougall doubts if there was a significant anti-war faction. Three other portents of disaster were described by Paolo Giovio in 1549 and repeated in John Polemon's 1578 account of the battle. When James was in council at the camp at Flodden Edge, a hare ran out of his tent and escaped the weapons of his knights; it was found that mice had gnawed away the strings and buckle of the king's helmet; and in the morning his tent was spreckled with a bloody dew.

=== Scotland after Flodden ===
The wife of James IV, Queen Margaret Tudor, is said to have awaited news of her husband at Linlithgow Palace, where a room at the top of a tower is called 'Queen Margaret's bower'. Ten days after the Battle of Flodden, the Lords of Council met at Stirling on 19 September, and set up a General Council of the Realm "to sit upon the daily council for all matters occurring in the realm" of thirty-five lords including clergymen, lords of parliament, and two of the minor barons, the lairds of The Bass and Inverrugy. This committee was intended to rule in the name of Margaret Tudor and her son James V of Scotland.

The full Parliament of Scotland met at Stirling Castle on 21 October, where the 17-month-old King was crowned in the Chapel Royal. The General Council of Lords made special provisions for the heirs of those killed at Flodden, following a declaration made by James IV at Twiselhaugh, and protection for their widows and daughters. Margaret Tudor remained guardian or 'tutrix' of the King, but was not made Regent of Scotland.

The French soldier Antoine d'Arces arrived at Dumbarton Castle in November with a shipload of armaments which were transported to Stirling. The English already knew the details of this planned shipment from a paper found in a bag at Flodden field. Now that James IV was dead, Antoine d'Arces promoted the appointment of John Stewart, Duke of Albany, a grandson of James II of Scotland as Regent to rule Scotland instead of Margaret and her son. Albany, who lived in France, came to Scotland on 26 May 1515. By that date Margaret had given birth to James's posthumous son Alexander and married the Earl of Angus.

A later sixteenth-century Scottish attitude to the futility of the battle was given by Robert Lindsay of Pitscottie, in words that he attributed to Patrick Lord Lindsay at council before the engagement. Lord Lindsay advised the King to withdraw, comparing their situation to an honest merchant playing dice with a trickster, and wagering a gold rose-noble against a bent halfpenny. Their King was the gold piece, England the trickster, and Thomas Howard the halfpenny.

== Casualties ==
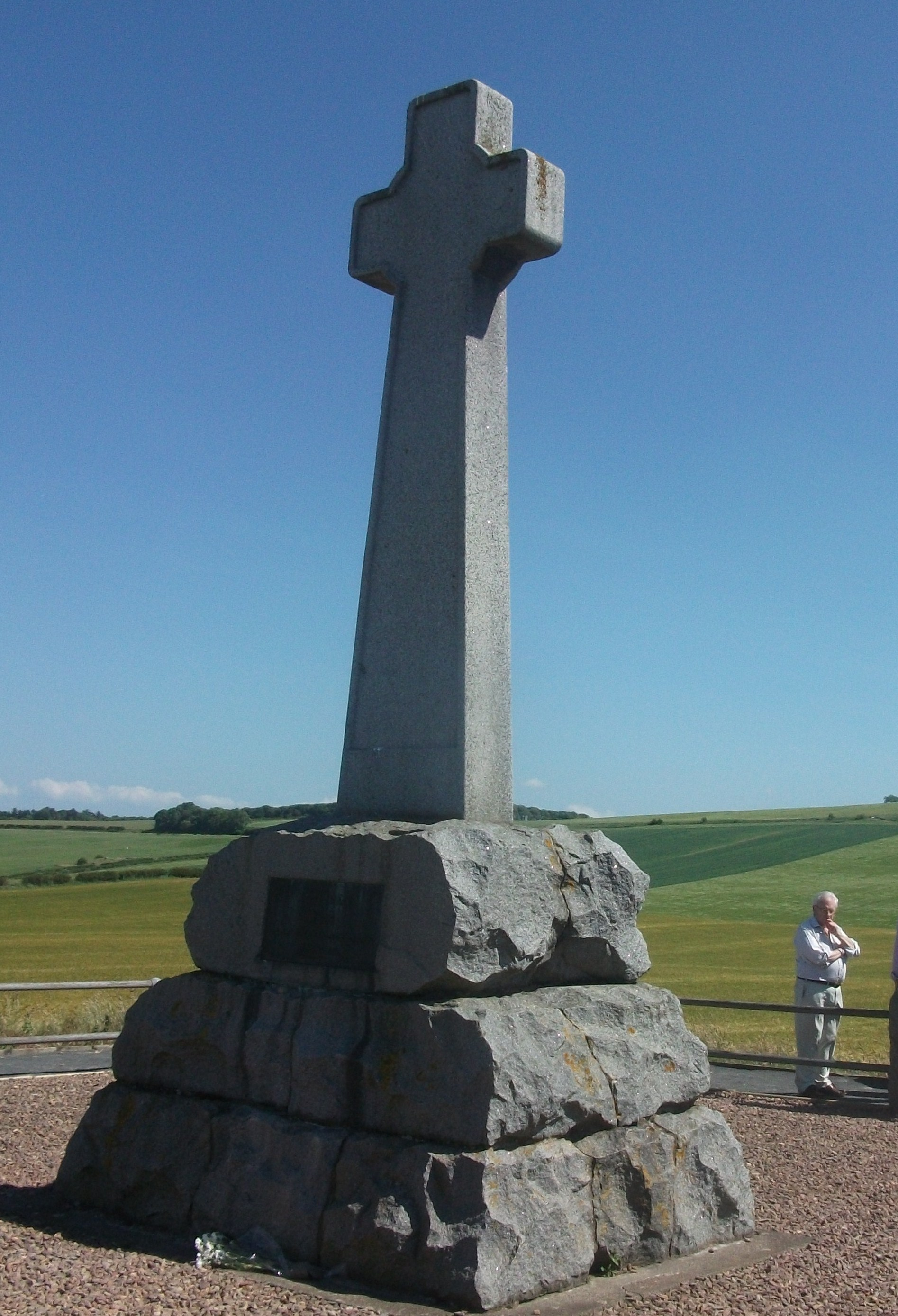
The Flodden memorial cross, erected in 1910, contemplated by the Tudor historian David Starkey.

Surrey's army lost 1,500 men killed in battle. There were various conflicting accounts of the Scottish loss. A contemporary account produced in French for the Royal Postmaster of England, in the immediate aftermath of the battle, states that about 10,000 Scots were killed, a claim repeated by Henry VIII on 16 September while he was still uncertain of the death of James IV. William Knight sent the news from Lille to Rome on 20 September, claiming 12,000 Scots had died, with fewer than 500 English casualties. Italian newsletters put the Scottish losses at 18,000 or 20,000 and the English at 5,000. Brian Tuke, the English Clerk of the Signet, sent a newsletter stating 10,000 Scots killed and 10,000 escaped the field. Tuke reckoned the total Scottish invasion force to have been 60,000 and the English army at 40,000. George Buchanan wrote in his History of Scotland (published in 1582) that, according to the lists that were compiled throughout the counties of Scotland, there were about 5,000 killed. A plaque on the monument to the 2nd Duke of Norfolk (as the Earl of Surrey became in 1514) at Thetford put the figure at 17,000. Edward Hall, thirty years after, wrote in his Chronicle that "12,000 at the least of the best gentlemen and flower of Scotland" were slain.

As the nineteenth-century antiquarian John Riddell supposed, nearly every noble family in Scotland would have lost a member at Flodden. The dead are remembered by the song (and pipe tune) "Flowers of the Forest":

We'll hae nae mair lilting, at the yowe-milking,
Women and bairns are dowie and wae.
Sighing and moaning, on ilka green loaning,
The flowers of the forest are all wede away.

Contemporary English ballads also recalled the significance of the Scottish losses:

To tell you plaine, twelve thousand were slaine,
that to the fight did stand;
And many prisoners tooke that day,
the best in all Scotland.

That day made many a fatherlesse childe,
and many a widow poore;
And many a Scottish gay Lady,
sate weeping in her bowre.

A legend grew that while the artillery was being prepared in Edinburgh before the battle, a demon called Plotcock had read out the names of those who would be killed at the Mercat Cross on the Royal Mile. According to Pitscottie, a former Provost of Edinburgh, Richard Lawson, who lived nearby, threw a coin at the Cross to appeal against this summons and survived the battle.

Branxton Church was the site of some burials from the Battle of Flodden.

After Flodden, many Scottish nobles are believed to have been brought to Yetholm for interment, as being the nearest consecrated ground in Scotland.

=== Notable Scotsmen who died ===
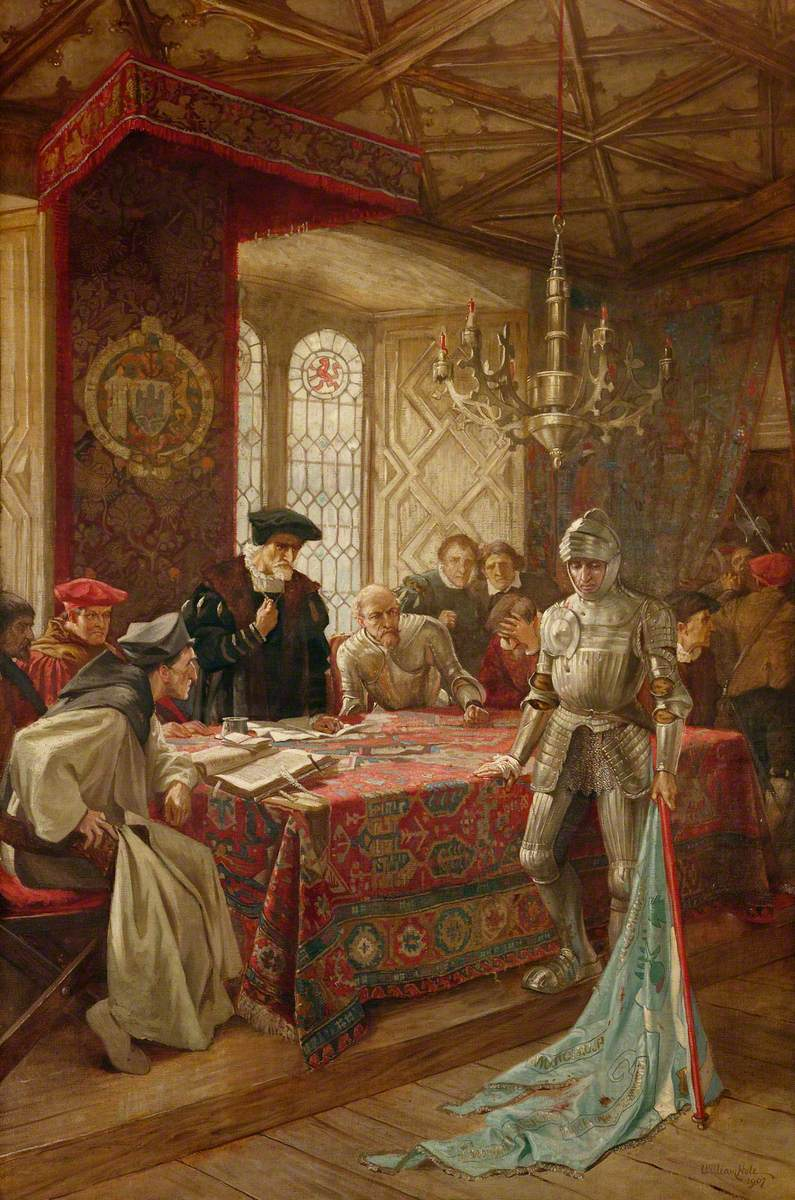
News of Flodden (William Hole), depicts a dejected soldier delivering a report to the Scottish court.

==== Royalty ====
- James IV, King of Scots (1473–1513, r. 1488–1513)

==== Clergy ====
- William Bunche, Abbot of Kilwinning
- George Hepburn, Bishop of the Isles and commendator of Arbroath and Iona
- Sir William Knollys, Lord St. John, Lord High Treasurer of Scotland, prior of Torphichen Preceptory.
- Laurence Oliphant, Abbot of Inchaffray
- Alexander Stewart, Archbishop of St Andrews and Lord Chancellor of Scotland, illegitimate son of James IV

==== Earls ====
- Archibald Campbell, 2nd Earl of Argyll
- John Douglas, 2nd Earl of Morton
- William Graham, 1st Earl of Montrose
- William Hay, 4th Earl of Erroll, Lord High Constable of Scotland
- Adam Hepburn, 2nd Earl of Bothwell, Lord High Admiral of Scotland
- David Kennedy, 1st Earl of Cassilis
- William Leslie, 3rd Earl of Rothes
- John Lindsay, 6th Earl of Crawford
- William Sinclair, 2nd Earl of Caithness
- Matthew Stewart, 2nd Earl of Lennox

==== Lords of Parliament ====
- William Borthwick, 3rd Lord Borthwick
- Alexander Elphinstone, 1st Lord Elphinstone.
- Robert Erskine, 4th Lord Erskine
- John Hay, 2nd Lord Hay of Yester
- John Maxwell, 4th Lord Maxwell
- John Ross, 2nd Lord Ross
- John Sempill, 1st Lord Sempill
- George Seton, 5th Lord Seton
- Henry Sinclair, 4th Lord Sinclair
- Andrew Stewart, 1st Lord Avondale
- Thomas Stewart, 2nd Lord Innermeath

==== Other Scottish casualties ====
- Abercromby of Ley.
- Robert Arnot of Woodmill. Comptroller of Scotland
- John Balfour of Denmilne.
- Blackadder of Blackadder.
- Boswell of Balmuto.
- Boswell of Auchinleck.
- Robert Bruce of Airth and Stenhouse.
- Duncan Campbell of Glenorchy.
- John Carnegie of Kinnaird.
- Alan Cathcart, Master of Cathcart, and his brothers Robert and John.
- William Carr.
- Robert Colville, Master of Ochiltree.
- William Cockburn of Langton and his eldest son and heir Alexander
- Robert Colville of Ochiltree.
- John Cornwall of Bonhard.
- Robert Crawford of Auchinames.
- John Crawford of Ardagh.
- Robert Crawford of Kilbirnie
- William Cunningham, 1st Laird of Craigends
- George Douglas, Master of Angus
- Sir William Douglas 6th of Drumlanrig
- Sir William Douglas of Glenbervie
- Sir John Douglas, 5th of Mains.
- Sir John Dunbar.
- Robert Elliot, 13th Chief of Clan Elliot
- John Erskine of Dun.
- Nicolas Fotheringham of Powrie
- Archibald Graham, 3rd of Garvock – King James' cousin
- George Graham, 1st of Calendar.
- Alexander Guthrie of Kincaldrum, and his son David
- John Haldane of Gleneagles.
- James Henderson of Fordell, Fife; Lord Justice Clerk
- Adam Hepburn of Craggis
- David Home of Wedderburn.
- Cuthbert Home, of Fast Castle.
- William Hoppringill, 1st Laird of Torwoodlee
- Patrick Houston.
- John Hunter 14th Laird of Hunterston
- Christopher Irving, Laird of Bonshaw.
- William Keith
- Alexander Lauder of Blyth, Provost of Edinburgh
- David, William, and George Lyon. All three brothers-in-law of Alexander Guthrie of Kincaldrum
- Uchtred MacDowall, Lord of Garthland
- William M'Clellan of Bomby
- Gilbert M'Clellan of Balmangan
- Patrick M'Clellan of Gelstoun
- Iain (John) MacFarlane 11th Baron of Arrochar, 8th Chief of Clan MacFarlane
- Lachlan MacLean, 10th Chief of Clan Maclean
- Duncan MacTavish, 6th Chief of Clan MacTavish.
- Allan MacTaus (MacTavish), brother of the 6th Chief.
- Ean MacTavish, heir to the chiefship of Clan MacTavish.
- Thomas Maule of Panmure.
- John Muirhead, Laird of Muirhead
- William Murray of Touchadam.
- Archibald Napier of Edinbellie.
- Colin Oliphant, Master of Oliphant
- Alexander Ramsay of Dalhousie
- Sir John Ramsay of Trarinzeane
- Sir William Seton, grandson of James I of Scotland
- Sir John Somerville of Cambusnethan
- James Stewart of Traquair.
- William Wallace of Craigie and Riccarton
- David Wemyss of Wemyss

=== Names of Scottish casualties from property records ===
A number of subsequent property transactions give names of the fallen. A register of royal charters was kept and published as the Register of the Great Seal of Scotland. The battle was mentioned because of the declaration James IV had made at Twiselhaugh respecting the heritage of the heirs of potential casualties, which waived feudal fees. Some of the lands noted were those held under Matthew, Earl of Lennox, who died in the battle of Flodden Field, "in campo bellico de Flodoun" (in the field of war at Flodden). Other great seal charters mentioned an altar dedicated for remembrance at St Giles', Edinburgh and the effect of the battle on Selkirk, a border town. These names include Adam Hacket, husband of Helen Mason.

The Exchequer Rolls of Scotland, a record of royal income, also gives names of the fallen. These were feudal tenants who held their lands from the King and would pay their dues directly to the exchequer. The names of landless men or those who held their lands from a landlord would not appear in this record. The preface to the published volume of the Exchequer Rolls gives this explanation and guide to the variety of Latin phrases used to describe deaths in the campaign;

The usual form of entry is "qui obiit in bello" (who died in the war), "in campo bellico" (in field of war), or "in campo" (in the field); but the forms also occur "qui obiit sub vixillo regis", (who died under the king's banner), which probably denotes that the fallen man was killed at Flodden, or "qui obiit in exercitu in Northumberland" (who died in the army in Northumberland), which perhaps indicates that the death occurred elsewhere than at Flodden, or that the place of death was unknown. In the Responde Books the earlier Sasines (property documents) are silent as to the campaign. The later Sasines refer to it as "bellum", or "campus bellicus," and it is not till 1518 that Flodden is named, and then only about half-a-dozen times. ..., It must be borne in mind that it is only the King's vassals or tenants who left heirs in lands in the comparatively small portion of Scotland then held by the King, whose names can be expected to appear in the present Accounts. Besides the names in the following list, there are many other instances of Sasines taken in favour of the heirs of persons whom we know from other sources to have died at Flodden. p.clxii

== English soldiers knighted at Flodden ==
Around forty-five English soldiers were knighted by the Earl of Surrey after the battle. Edward Hall mentions some of their positions in the army's advance from Newcastle.

- Lord Scrope of Upsall, forward in army
- Edmund Howard, right-wing, and Marshall of Horse
- George Darcy, (son of Thomas Darcy), rear ward or guard.
- William Gascoigne, junior, rearward
- William Middleton
- William Mauleverer, of Arncliffe
- Thomas Berkeley, rearward
- Marmaduke Constable, junior, left-hand wing
- Christopher Dacre
- John Howthom
- Nicholas Appleyard, forward
- Edward Gorges, (nephew of the Earl of Surrey)
- Ralph Ellerker, junior
- John Willoughby, rearward
- Edward Etchingham, forward
- William Pennington
- John Stanley, rearward
- Walter Stonor
- Ninian Markenfield of Markington (d. 1527), rearward
- Thomas Burgh
- Ralph Bowes, (father of George Bowes)
- William Roos
- Bryan Stapleton of Wyghall, rear guard.
- William Newton
- Thomas Newton
- Guy Dawnay, rearward.
- Roger Grey
- Ralph Salvayne
- Roger Collingwood
- Richard Mauleverer
- William Mauleverer
- Roger Farewell
- William Constable of Hatfield (in Holderness), right wing.
- William Constable of Carthorpe
- Thomas Stranguishe
- John Bulmer, (uncle of Ralph Bulmer)
- Christopher Danby, of Thorp Perrow, (father of Christopher Danby)
- Edmund Walsingham
- Thomas Conyers
- Roger Fenwick, Constable of Newcastle
- Edward Musgrave, of Hartley
- William Percy
- Christopher Pickering of Killington (d. 1519)
- Henry Thwaites
- John Lumley, (Lord Lumley)
- Roger Ogle, (Lord Ogle)

== Battlefield today ==
The battlefield still looks much as it probably did at the time of the battle, but the burn and marsh which so badly hampered the Scots advance is now drained. A monument, erected in 1910, is easily reached from Branxton village by following the road past St Paul's Church. There is a small car park and a clearly marked and signposted battlefield trail with interpretive boards which make it easy to visualise the battle. Only the chancel arch remains of the medieval church where James IV's body was said to have rested after the battle – the rest is Victorian, dating from 1849 in the "Norman" style.

Each year, the neighbouring Scottish town of Coldstream marks the Battle of Flodden with a traditional horse ride to the battlefield and then having a service to mark all those who perished during the fight during the town's "Civic Week" – held in the first week of August.

== Commemoration ==
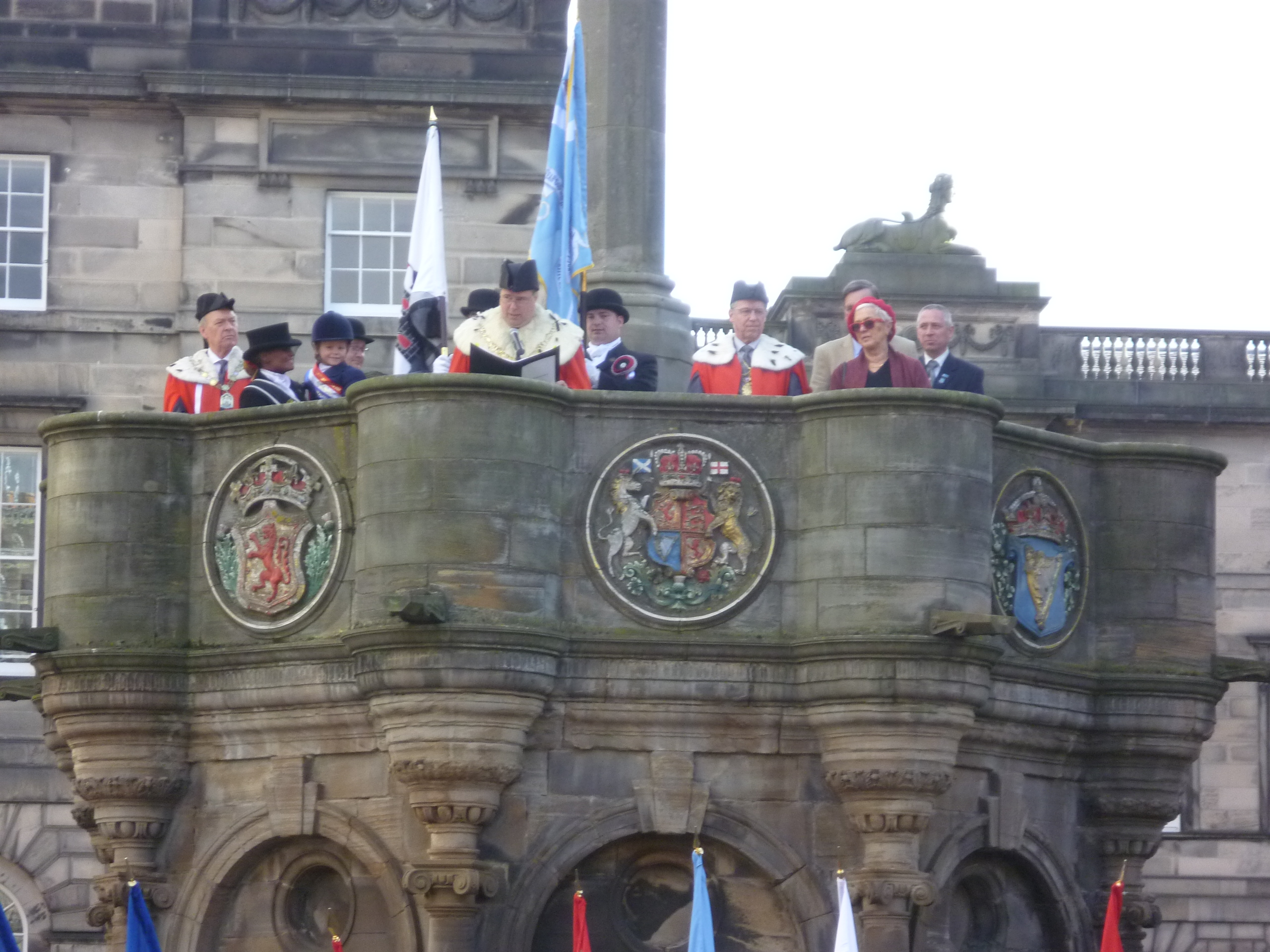
On the 500th anniversary of the battle a minute's silence for the town's dead was observed at the Mercat Cross in Edinburgh

The stained-glass Flodden Window in St Leonard's Church, Middleton, now in Greater Manchester, reputedly houses the oldest war memorial in Great Britain, constructed by Sir Richard Assheton in memory of the Battle of Flodden and the archers from Middleton who fought in it.

The Quincentennial of the battle in 2013 was commemorated by a programme of projects and events bringing together communities from both sides of the border. A number were funded by an £887,300 Heritage Lottery Fund grant including the expansion of the Flodden 1513 Ecomuseum and archaeology, documentary research and education projects, exhibitions and a solemn commemoration.

== In fiction ==
- Marmion: A Tale of Flodden Field (1808), an epic poem in six cantos by Sir Walter Scott
- The Battle of Flodden Field, told from several different perspectives, is the subject of the novel, Flodden Field, by Elisabeth McNeill, published in 2007.
- Flodden from the perspective of a Yorkshire archer is the subject of the novel Tom Fleck, by Harry Nicholson, published in 2011.
- The Flowers of the Forest, a historical novel by Elizabeth Byrd, chronicles the life of Queen Margaret Tudor of Scotland and culminates in the Battle of Flodden.
- Arthur Sullivan wrote an overture, his Overture Marmion (1867), inspired by the Scott poem.
- Sunset at Noon by Jane Oliver (1955) is a fictional account of the life of James IV.
- There is no historical record of anyone from the Clan Munro taking part in the Battle of Flodden Field; however, there is an old tradition that the Munros of Argyll are descended from a Flodden survivor. One of these descendants was Neil Munro.
- Gary Mill's 2017 novel 'Flodden' is a dramatised account of the battle of Flodden
- Graham Cooper's 2021 novel, An Ròs a Leigheas, written in Scottish Gaelic and published by Luath Press, is an account of the last few months of James IV's life leading up to the Flodden campaign, as seen through the eyes of his fool Tòmas.

== In film and television ==
- The British documentary series Two Men in a Trench also featured the battle in its first season, giving an accurate picture of what occurred and explaining the battle dynamics, showing the weakness and strong points of weapons used, etc.
- The second season of the Starz television series The Spanish Princess featured the battle. The depiction was fictionalized in certain respects, for example by having the title character, Catherine of Aragon, on the battlefield at the head of the English troops while heavily pregnant. The filming location was the Mendip Hills in Somerset.
- Towards the beginning of the 1969 movie The Prime of Miss Jean Brodie the title character talks about The Battle of Flodden.

== See also ==
- Clan MacTavish — Battle of Flodden
- Percy Folio
- Selkirk Common Riding
- Teribus ye teri odin
