= Henry Hayes =

Henry Hayes may refer to:

== People ==
- Henry Hayes (politician), Democratic member of the Wisconsin State Assembly
- Henry Browne Hayes (1762–1832), Irish-born convict
- Henry Hayes (musician), American musician and record label founder
- a pen name sometimes used by Ellen Olney Kirk

== Characters ==
- Henry Hayes (Deathlok), an incarnation of the Marvel Comics character Deathlok
- Henry Hayes (Stargate), a fictional character in the Stargate universe

== See also ==
- Harry Hayes (disambiguation)
- Harry Hays (disambiguation)
- Henry Hays (disambiguation)
