= De la Haye =

de la Haye, de La Haye, or de-la-Haye is a surname. Notable people with the surname include:

- Charlotte-Jeanne Béraud de La Haye de Riou, known as Madame de Montesson (1738–1806), playwright, wife of Louis Philippe d'Orléans, duc d'Orléans
- Corneille de La Haye, also known as Corneille de Lyon (died 1575), Dutch portrait painter
- Donald De La Haye (born 1996), American football kicker for the San Antonio Brahmas and YouTube personality
- Jean de La Haye (1593–1661), French Franciscan preacher and Biblical scholar
- Louis Marie de la Haye, Vicomte de Cormenin (1788–1868), French jurist and political pamphleteer
- Nicola de la Haye (between 1150 and 1156 to 1230), castellan of Lincoln Castle, England

== See also ==
- De la Hay (disambiguation)
- Delahaye, automobile manufacturer
- Delahaye (surname)
