= Logan Hay =

American lawyer, historian, and politician

Logan Hay (February 13, 1871–June 2, 1942) was an American lawyer, historian, and politician.

== Biography ==
Logan Hay was the son of Milton Hay (1817-1893), a Springfield, Illinois lawyer, and his wife Mary (Logan) Hay (d. 1874), daughter of Stephen T. Logan.

Hay was born in Springfield, Illinois. He went to Lawrenceville School in Lawrenceville, New Jersey. He went to Yale University and Harvard Law School. At Yale, He was a member of Skull & Bones. He was admitted to the Illinois bar in 1897. From 1903 to 1906, Hay served on the Springfield City Council. He then served in the Illinois Senate from 1906 to 1914.

Hay followed his father into the law, establishing a law practice in Springfield. He was a delegate to the 1912 Republican National Convention. He was the president of the Illinois State Bar Association for 1920–21.

Hay was deeply involved in the activities of the Abraham Lincoln Association. Following the death of John Whitfield Bunn in 1920, Hay served as president of the association from 1920 until his death. In 1967, the association created a medal known as the Logan Hay Medal that is awarded to individuals who have made noteworthy contributions to preserving and promoting the memory of Abraham Lincoln.

He died on June 2, 1942, at his home in Springfield, Illinois.
