= William Hay, 4th Earl of Erroll =

Scottish peer and soldier

The Right Honourable The Earl of Erroll
- Arms of the Earl of Erroll

8th Lord High Constable of Scotland
- In office 1507–1513
- Preceded by: William Hay
- Succeeded by: William Hay

Personal details
- Born: 1470 Huntly, Aberdeenshire, Scotland
- Died: 9 September 1513 (age 42 or 43) Battle of Flodden, Northumberland, England
- Spouse(s): Christian Lyon; Margaret Kinloch
- Children: William Hay, 5th Earl of Erroll; Lady Isabel Hay
- Parent(s): William Hay, 3rd Earl of Erroll; Lady Isabel Gordon

William Hay, 4th Earl of Erroll (1470 – 9 September 1513), styled as Lord Hay until 1507, was a Scottish peer and soldier. He was killed at the Battle of Flodden.

== Biography ==
William Hay was the son of William Hay, 3rd Earl of Erroll. He had double royal lineage: his grandfather, William Hay, 1st Earl of Erroll was a great-great grandson of King Robert II of Scotland; and his maternal grandfather was James I of Scotland.

He served as the Lord High Constable of Scotland, a hereditary title that was, after the king, the supreme officer of the Scottish army. He was killed on 9 September 1513 in the Battle of Flodden, near Branxton, Northumberland. He died alongside his younger brother Thomas, King James IV of Scotland and more than a dozen dukes and earls in a decisive English victory.

== Marriage and issue ==
He married Christian Lyon, daughter of John Lyon, 3rd Lord Glamis, and had two children:

1. William Hay, 5th Earl of Erroll (c. 1495, Errol, Perthshire, Scotland – 28 July 1522 in Edinburgh)
2. Lady Isabel Hay

He married secondly Margaret Kinloch of Cruvie, widow of Sir James Sandilands, 5th feudal baron of Calder.

== Ancestry ==
Ancestors of William Hay, 4th Earl of Erroll

16. Sir William de la Haye, 1st Lord Hay
8. Gilbert Hay
17. Margaret Gray
4. William Hay, 1st Earl of Erroll
18. William Hay of Yester
9. Alicia Hay
19. Alicia de la Haye
2. William Hay, 3rd Earl of Erroll
20. Archibald Douglas, 3rd Earl of Douglas
10. James Douglas, 7th Earl of Douglas
21. Joanna de Moravia
5. Lady Beatrix Douglas
22. Robert Stewart, Duke of Albany
11. Lady Beatrix Stewart
23. Margaret Graham, Countess of Menteith
1. William Hay, 4th Earl of Erroll
24. Alexander Seton, Lord Gordon
12. Alexander Gordon, 1st Earl of Huntly
25. Lady Elizabeth Stewart
6. George Gordon, 2nd Earl of Huntly
26. William Crichton, 1st Lord Crichton
13. Elizabeth Crichton
27. Agnes Maitland
3. Lady Isabel Gordon
Robert III of Scotland
James I of Scotland
Anabella Drummond
7. Annabella of Scotland
30. John Beaufort, 1st Earl of Somerset
Lady Joan Beaufort
31. Margaret Holland, Duchess of Clarence

Military offices
Preceded by William Hay	Lord High Constable of Scotland; 1507–1513	Succeeded by William Hay
Peerage of Scotland
Preceded by William Hay	Earl of Erroll; 1507–1513	Succeeded by William Hay
