= William Hays (painter) =

American painter

- Born: July 1, 1872; Catskill, New York, United States
- Died: September 30, 1934 (aged 62); Millbrook, New York, United States
- Occupation: Painter

William Hays (July 1, 1872 – September 30, 1934) was an American painter. His work was part of the painting event in the art competition at the 1932 Summer Olympics.
