= William Hay, 3rd Earl of Erroll =

Scottish peer (c. 1449–1507)

The Right Honourable The Earl of Erroll PC
- Arms of the Earl of Erroll

7th Lord High Constable of Scotland
- In office 1470–1507
- Preceded by: Nicholas Hay
- Succeeded by: William Hay

Personal details
- Born: c. 1449 Errol, Perthshire, Scotland
- Died: 14 January 1507 (age 70 or 71) Huntly, Aberdeenshire
- Spouse(s): Isabel Gordon; Elizabeth Leslie
- Children: 7, including William
- Parent(s): William Hay, 1st Earl of Erroll; Beatrix Douglas

William Hay, 3rd Earl of Erroll PC (c. 1449 – 14 January 1507) was a Scottish peer. He was the third Earl of Erroll and the fourth Lord Hay of Erroll.

== Biography ==
William Hay was the son of William Hay, 1st Earl of Erroll and his wife, Beatrix, daughter of James Douglas, 7th Earl of Douglas. He was the great-great grandson of King Robert II of Scotland and his first wife, Elizabeth Mure.

He inherited the earldom after the death of his older brother, Nicholas, in 1470.

He was a member of the King James III's Privy Council and a commissioner for the 1482 peace treaty with England.

== Marriage and issue ==
He married first Lady Isabel Gordon, daughter of George Gordon, 2nd Earl of Huntly and Princess Annabella of Scotland, daughter of King James I of Scotland. They had three sons and one daughter:

1. William Hay, 4th Earl of Erroll, killed with his brother at the Battle of Flodden, 9 September 1513. He married Christian Lyon, daughter of John Lyon, 3rd Lord Glamis, and had issue:
  1. William Hay, 5th Earl of Erroll
2. Thomas Hay of Logie, killed at Flodden. He married Margaret Logie, daughter of Lyon Logie of that Ilk, and had issue:
  1. George Hay, 7th Earl of Erroll
  2. Beatrix Hay
3. John Hay
4. Lady Beatrix Hay, contracted to marry eldest son of Sir William Keith of Inverugie

He married secondly Lady Elizabeth Leslie, daughter of George Leslie, 1st Earl of Rothes. They had two sons and one daughter:

1. John II Hay
2. William Hay of Lesk
3. Lady Elizabeth Hay, married David Lindsay, 8th Earl of Crawford

Military offices
Preceded by Nicholas Hay	Lord High Constable of Scotland; 1470–1507	Succeeded by William Hay
Peerage of Scotland
Preceded by Nicholas Hay	Earl of Erroll; 1470–1507	Succeeded by William Hay
