= Millar Hay =

Scottish footballer

Personal information
- Full name: Millar Adam Hay
- Date of birth: 20 May 1946 (age 80)
- Place of birth: Cathcart, Scotland
- Position: Forward

Senior career*
Years	Team	Apps	(Gls)
1964–1969	Queen's Park	154	(31)
1969–1972	Clyde	67	(8)
1972–1973	Hamilton Academical	22	(0)

International career
1965–1969	Scotland Amateurs	14	(2)
1968	Great Britain	2	(0)
- * Club domestic league appearances and goals

Millar Adam Hay (born 20 May 1946) is a Scottish retired amateur footballer who made over 150 appearances in the Scottish League for Queen's Park as a forward. He also played for Clyde and Hamilton Academical. Hay represented Scotland at amateur level and made two 1968 Summer Olympic qualifying appearances for Great Britain.
