= Milton Hay =

American politician

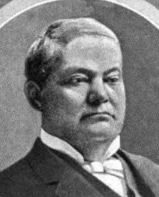

Member of the Illinois House of Representatives
- In office 1874–1876

Personal details
- Born: July 3, 1817 Lexington, Kentucky, US
- Died: September 16, 1893 (aged 76) Springfield, Illinois, US
- Party: Republican
- Children: Logan Hay
- Occupation: Lawyer

Milton Hay (July 3, 1817 – September 16, 1893) was an American politician and lawyer.

== Biography ==
Hay was born in Lexington, Kentucky. He moved with his family to Springfield, Illinois in 1832. He went to the public schools and was taught at home. Hay studied law at the law office of Abraham Lincoln and John T. Stuart in Springfield, Illinois. He was admitted to the Illinois bar in 1840 and practiced law in Pittsfield, Illinois until 1858. Hay then practiced law in Springfield, Illinois, with John M. Palmer and with Shelby Moore Cullom. Hay served in the Illinois Constitutional Convention of 1872 and was a Republican. He also served in the Illinois House of Representatives from 1874 to 1876. He died at his home in Springfield, Illinois. His son Logan Hay also served in the Illinois General Assembly. Hay was the son-in-law of Stephen T. Logan.
