= John Riddell (genealogist) =

John Riddell (1785 – 8 February 1862) was a Scottish peerage lawyer and genealogist.

== Life ==
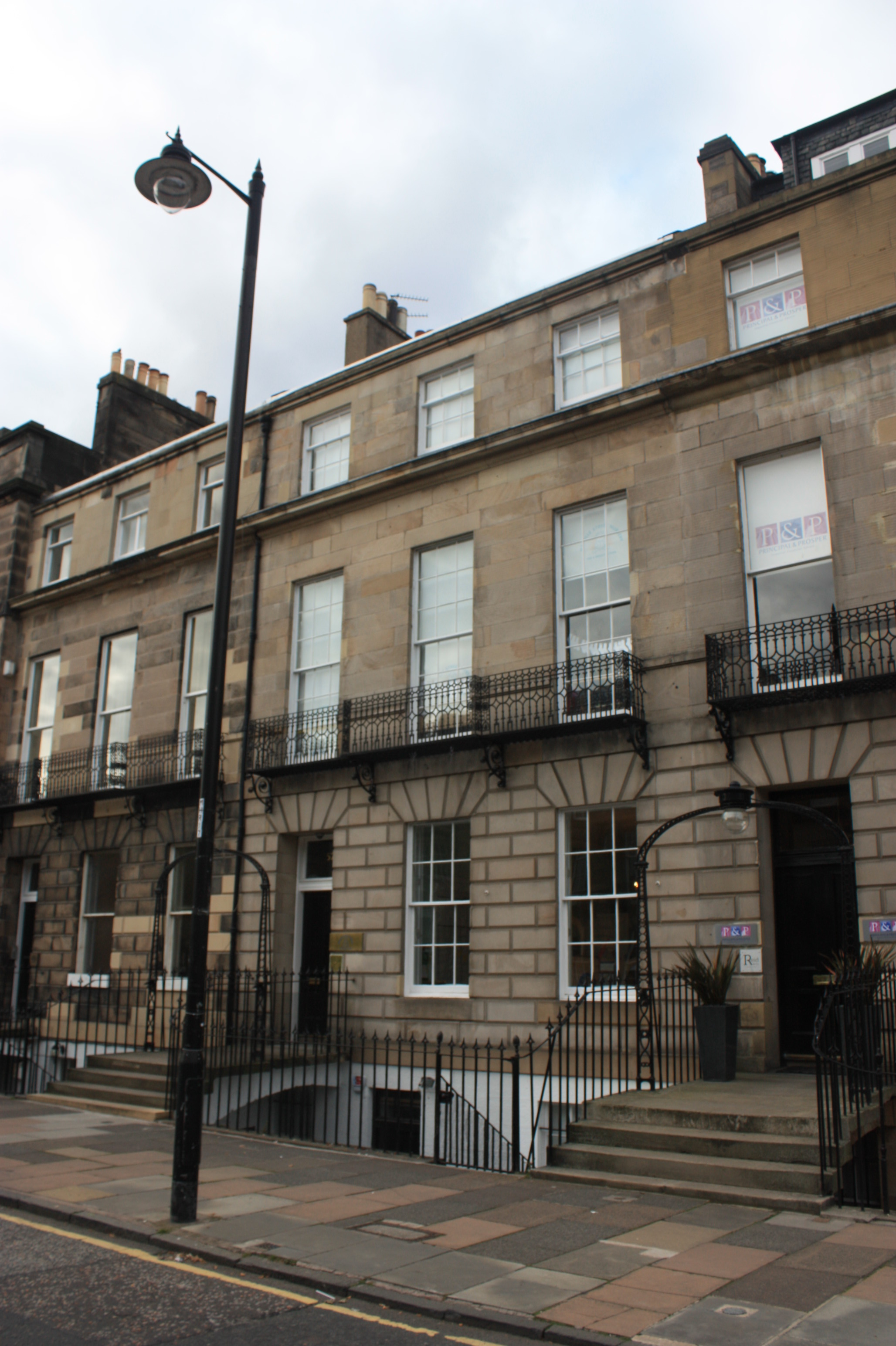
Riddell's house at 57 Melville Street, Edinburgh

He was eldest son of Anne, eldest daughter of John Glassford of Dougalston, by Anne, daughter of Sir John Nisbet of Dean, and Henry Riddell of Little Govan. Educated for the law, he was called to the Scottish bar in 1807.

Riddell made genealogy and Scottish peerage law a special study. He prepared the Crawford and Montrose peerage cases for James Lindsay, 24th Earl of Crawford.

Riddell died unmarried at his house, 57 Melville Street, Edinburgh, on 8 February 1862. He was buried in the Dean Cemetery on the west side of the city.

He left a number of manuscripts which, in terms of his will, were acquired by the Advocates' and Signet Libraries, Edinburgh.

== Works ==
Riddell enjoyed genealogical research for its own sake, and his speciality earned him an allusion in The Lay of the Last Minstrel. His works were:

- The Saltfoot Controversy, with a Reply; also an Appendix containing some Remarks on the present State of the Lyon Office, Edinburgh.
- Reply to the Mis-statements of Dr. Hamilton of Bardowie respecting the Descent of his Family; with Remarks on the Claim of the Lennoxes of Woodhead to the Male Representation and Honours of the Original Earls of Lennox, Edinburgh, 1828.
- Remarks upon Scottish Peerage Law, with special Reference to the Case of the Earldom of Devon, 1833, Edinburgh.
- Tracts, Legal and Historical; containing (1) Reply to Mr. Tytler's Historical Remarks on the Death of Richard II; (2) Observations upon the Representation of the Rusky and Lennox Families, and other Points in Mr. Napier's Memoirs of Merchiston; (3) Remarks upon the Law of Legitimation per subsequens matrimonium; the Nature of our English Canons and the Legitimacy of the Stewarts, Edinburgh, 1835.
- Additional Remarks upon the Question of the Lennox or Rusky Representation, and other Topics, Edinburgh, 1835.
- Inquiry into the Law and Practice in Scottish Peerages before and after the Union, involving the Questions of Jurisdiction and Forfeitures; with an Exposition of our original Consistorial Law, 2 vols., 1842, Edinburgh; based on Remarks upon Scottish Peerage Law, it became a standard work on its subject.
- Stewartiana; being more about the Case of Robert II, and his Issue, Edinburgh, 1843.
- Comments in Refutation of Pretensions as to the Representation of the ancient Stirlings of Calder: a Review of "The Stirlings of Keir", Edinburgh, 1860.

== Notes ==
Attribution

This article incorporates text from a publication now in the public domain: Lee, Sidney, ed. (1896). "Riddell, John". Dictionary of National Biography. Vol. 48. London: Smith, Elder & Co.
