= William Hay, 5th Earl of Erroll =

Scottish peer and statesman

The Right Honourable The Earl of Erroll
- Arms of the Earl of Erroll

9th Lord High Constable of Scotland
- In office 1513–1522
- Preceded by: William Hay, 4th Earl of Erroll
- Succeeded by: William Hay, 6th Earl of Erroll

Personal details
- Born: c. 1495 Errol, Perthshire, Scotland
- Died: 28 July 1522 (age 26 or 27) Edinburgh, Scotland
- Spouse: Elizabeth Ruthven
- Children: William Hay, 6th Earl of Erroll
- Parent(s): William Hay, 4th Earl of Erroll; Christian Lyon

William Hay, 5th Earl of Erroll (c. 1495 – 28 July 1522) was a Scottish peer and statesman.

== Biography ==
William Hay was the son of the William Hay, 4th Earl of Erroll and Christian Lyon. He had double royal lineage, descended from Kings Robert II of Scotland and James I of Scotland.

He inherited the earldom on 20 October 1513, aged approximately 18. In his role as Lord High Constable of Scotland, the young earl was sent as a commissioner to France in 1515 and to England in 1516.

== Marriage and issue ==
William Hay married Elizabeth Ruthven, youngest daughter of William Ruthven, 1st Lord Ruthven by his second wife, Christian Forbes, and had one son by her:

- William Hay, 6th Earl of Erroll (1521 – 11 April 1541)

He died on 28 July 1522, not yet 30 years old. As his son William died under 21 years of age, the lands of Errol, Perthshire were held by the Crown, until the end of 1541, when the title was inherited by George Hay, the grandson of William Hay, 3rd Earl of Erroll.

== Ancestry ==
Ancestors of William Hay, 5th Earl of Erroll

16. Gilbert of the Haye
8. William Hay, 1st Earl of Erroll
17. Alicia Hay
4. William Hay, 3rd Earl of Erroll
18. James Douglas, 7th Earl of Douglas
9. Lady Beatrix Douglas
19. Lady Beatrix Stewart
2. William Hay, 4th Earl of Erroll
20. Alexander Gordon, 1st Earl of Huntly
10. George Gordon, 2nd Earl of Huntly
21. Elizabeth Crichton
5. Lady Isabel Gordon
James I of Scotland
11. Annabella of Scotland
Lady Joan Beaufort
1. William Hay, 5th Earl of Erroll
24. Sir John Lyon of Glamis
12. Patrick Lyon, 1st Lord Glamis
25. Lady Elizabeth Graham
6. John Lyon, 3rd Lord Glamis
26. Walter Ogilvy
13. Isabel Ogilvy
27. Isabel Glen
3. Christian Lyon
28. Sir James Scrymgeour
14. Sir John Scrymgeour
29. Aegidia Maxwell
7. Elizabeth Scrymgeour
30. Sir William Abernathy, 6th of Saltoun
15. Marion Abernathy
31. Lady Mary Stewart

Military offices
Preceded by William Hay	Lord High Constable of Scotland; 1513–1522	Succeeded by William Hay
Peerage of Scotland
Preceded by William Hay	Earl of Erroll; 1513–1522	Succeeded by William Hay
