= Gilbert Hay =

Gilbert Hay may refer to:

- Gilbert Hay (poet) (1403–?), Scottish poet
- Gilbert Hay, 11th Earl of Erroll, Scottish nobleman
- Gilbert I de la Hay (died 1263), co-Regent of Scotland during King Alexander III of Scotland's minority
- Gilbert II de la Hay (died 1333), Lord High Constable of Scotland
