= Alexander Hay =

Alexander Hay may refer to:

- Alexander Hay (died 1594), Scottish politician
- Alexander Hay, Lord Fosterseat (c. 1560–1640), Scottish judge
- Alexander Hay (mayor) (1806–1882), mayor of Pittsburgh, 1842–1845
- Alexander Hay (South Australian politician) (1820–1898), member of the South Australian Parliament
- Alexander Hay (songwriter) (1826–after 1891), Newcastle–born cabinet maker, songwriter and poet
- Alexander Hay (Australian politician) (1865–1941), New Zealand-born member of the Australian House of Representatives
- Alexander Leith Hay (1758–1838), British army officer
- Alex Hay (1933–2011), Scottish golfer
