= Henry Hay =

Henry Hay may refer to:

- Harry Hay (swimmer) (1893–1952), Australian swimmer
- Henry Hay (writer) (1910–1985), journalist, translator and writer on magic
- Harry Hay (Henry Hay, Jr., 1912–2002), gay rights and labor activist

== See also ==
- Henry Hays (disambiguation)
- Henry Maurice Drummond-Hay
