= Elizabeth Hay =

Elizabeth Hay may refer to:

- Elizabeth Hay (novelist) (born 1951), Canadian writer
- Elizabeth Monroe Hay, full name of Eliza Monroe Hay (1786–1840)
- Elizabeth Wellesley, Duchess of Wellington (1820–1904), née Lady Elizabeth Hay, British peer
- Elizabeth Hay, Countess of Erroll (1801–1856), wife to the Earl of Erroll
- Betty Hay (1927–2007), American biologist

== See also ==
- Liz Hayes (born 1956), Australian television presenter
