= Arthur Hay (cricketer) =

Australian clergyman and cricketer

Personal information
- Full name: William Arthur Hay
- Born: 6 December 1873; Peterhead, Aberdeenshire, Scotland
- Died: 16 June 1945 (aged 71); Claremont, Perth, Western Australia
- Batting: Left-handed
- Bowling: Slow-medium left-arm orthodox

Domestic team information
- Years: Team
- 1917/18: Otago

Career statistics
Competition	First-class
Matches	2
Runs scored	17
Batting average	8.50
100s/50s	0/0
Top score	13
Balls bowled	552
Wickets	18
Bowling average	10.66
5 wickets in innings	2
10 wickets in match	1
Best bowling	8/70
Catches/stumpings	1/–
- Source: ESPNcricinfo, 14 May 2016

William Arthur Hay (6 December 1873 – 16 June 1945) was an Australian Methodist minister. He was also a cricketer, who played two first-class matches for Otago in New Zealand in the 1917–18 season, taking 18 wickets.

== Life and career ==
Born in Scotland, the eldest of 11 children, Hay came with his family to Australia in the 1880s. He began his ministry in 1896 as the inaugural Wesleyan minister of the newly established mining settlements of Black Flag and Broad Arrow in the West Australian goldfields. After postings in the West Australian towns of Collie, Northam and Bunbury, he was appointed to Mount Eden Methodist Church in Auckland, New Zealand, in 1911.

While in Northam, Hay, a slow-medium left-arm spin bowler and left-handed batsman, had played for a representative Western Australia Eastern Districts cricket team against the touring New South Wales state team in March 1907. He played cricket in Auckland for the Eden club, and was close to selection for the Auckland representative team in early 1913. When he was posted to Dunedin in 1914 he played in the senior competition with the Carisbrook club.

Hay was selected to play for the Otago cricket team in March 1918 against Southland at the Carisbrook ground in Dunedin. Making his first-class cricket debut at the age of 44 years 102 days, he opened the bowling and bowled unchanged through both innings, taking 8 for 70 and 4 for 48 for match figures of 58–14–118–12. Two weeks later, also at Carisbrook, he took 5 for 49 and 1 for 25 against Canterbury for match figures of 34–10–74–6. Otago won both matches.

He was transferred to Timaru in 1919 to take charge of the Methodist circuit there. While in Timaru he represented South Canterbury at cricket, taking 7 for 27 (all bowled) in a victory over Ashburton County in January 1923, then a week later he played for a combined South Canterbury, Ashburton County and North Otago team against the touring Marylebone Cricket Club, taking two wickets. At the time a local newspaper described his bowling thus: "Medium-pace left-hand round-the-wicket bowler; breaks from off or leg at will."

In 1923 Hay was transferred to Christchurch. In early 1928 he took time off for health reasons and visited Western Australia. He did not resume his duties in Christchurch and in early 1929 he was transferred to West Perth. He then served in Kalgoorlie from 1935 to 1940, when he was transferred to Subiaco in Perth. In 1941 he was elected president of the Methodist Conference of Western Australia.

== Personal life ==
Hay married Emma Jane ("Minnie") Langridge in Melbourne in April 1902. They had a daughter, Jean, a noted New Zealand educator, and a son, Hugh. Minnie died in Perth in September 1934. Hay died in June 1945, aged 71, survived by his second wife, Myrtle, and Jean and Hugh.
