= Billy Hayes (footballer) =

English footballer

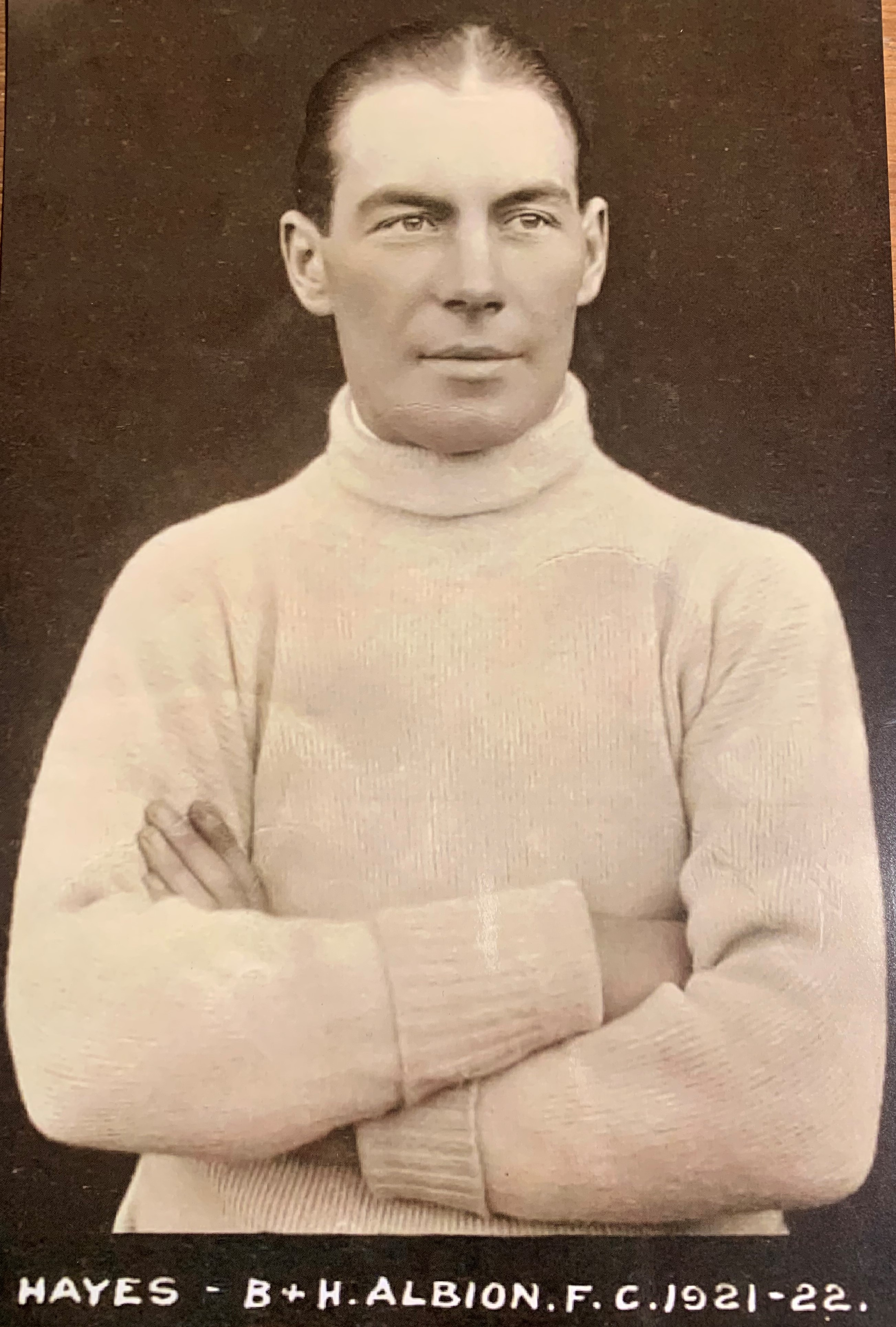
- Hayes in 1921

Personal information
- Full name: William Edward Hayes
- Date of birth: 8 November 1895
- Place of birth: Croston, England
- Date of death: 1956
- Position: Goalkeeper

Youth career
- Eccleston

Senior career*
Years	Team	Apps	(Gls)
1912–1919	Preston North End	10	(0)
- → Chorley (loan)
1919–1924	Brighton & Hove Albion	209	(0)
1924–1926	Southend United	51	(0)
1926–1927	Accrington Stanley	41	(0)
1927–1928	Stockport County	16	(0)
- Winsford United
- Burscough Rangers
- Stalybridge Celtic
- Bacup Borough
- * Club domestic league appearances and goals

William Edward Hayes (8 November 1895 – after 1928) was an English professional footballer who played as a goalkeeper. He began his senior career with Preston North End, where he made 10 league appearances, all of them in the 1914–15 season. During the First World War, he played one match as a guest for Burnley. After the war, Hayes played for several clubs, including Brighton & Hove Albion and Southend United, playing more than 250 league matches. Towards the end of his career, he played for a number of non-League sides.
