= William Haye =

Jamaican cricketer (1948–2019)

Personal information
- Born: 15 September 1948
- Died: 18 March 2019 (aged 70); Jamaica
- Source: Cricinfo, 26 December 2019

William Haye (15 September 1948 – 18 March 2019) was a Jamaican cricketer who played in seven first-class and two List A matches for Jamaica between 1970 and 1977. In March 2019, he was shot dead in his own home, before the house was set on fire.

== See also ==
- List of cricketers who were murdered
