= Bill Hayes (Australian footballer) =

Australian rules footballer

Personal information
- Full name: William Maurice Hayes
- Born: 30 April 1896; Essendon, Victoria
- Died: 28 March 1975 (aged 78); Deniliquin
- Height: 175 cm (5 ft 9 in)
- Weight: 77 kg (170 lb)

Playing career^{1}
Years	Club	Games (Goals)
1923–24	Essendon	4 (0)
- ^{1} Playing statistics correct to the end of 1924.

William Maurice Hayes (30 April 1896 – 28 March 1975) was an Australian rules footballer who played with Essendon in the Victorian Football League (VFL).
