= Annabella of Scotland =

Annabella Stewart of Scotland
- Countess of Geneva; Countess of Huntly
- Born: c. 1436
- Died: 1509 (Aged 73)
- Spouse: Louis of Savoy, Count of Geneva (m. 1447; ann. 1458) George Gordon, 2nd Earl of Huntly (m. 1459; ann. 1471)
- Issue: Alexander Gordon, 3rd Earl of Huntly; Isabella Gordon
- House: House of Stewart
- Father: James I of Scotland
- Mother: Joan Beaufort

Annabella of Scotland (c. 1436 – 1509) was a Scottish princess, a member of the House of Stewart, and by her two marriages Countess of Geneva and Countess of Huntly. Both of her marriages were annulled; the first without being consummated, and the second on grounds of consanguinity.

== Life ==
=== Early years ===
Presumably named after her paternal grandmother, Annabella was the eighth child and sixth daughter of King James I and Joan Beaufort. Her sisters were Margaret, Isabella, Eleanor, Mary and Joan, and her brothers were James II of Scotland and his twin brother Alexander, who died in infancy.

=== First marriage ===
On 14 December 1444 was signed the marriage contract between Annabella and Louis, Count of Geneva, son of Louis, Duke of Savoy at Stirling Castle. Both bride and groom were about 8 years old. The following year, Annabella went to Savoy to be educated there.

The cortege of the princess, accompanied by the ambassadors of her father-in-law, arrived in Savoy in September 1445, after an eventful journey of 86 days. Many expenses were incurred for her reception, even though she was neither the heiress to the Kingdom of Scotland nor the future Duchess of Savoy.

However, the official wedding was never celebrated. King Charles VII of France, wasn't in favor of this alliance and sent several embassies to prevent it. The marriage contract was thus broken during negotiations at Gannat in 1458, in the presence of the French King and the representatives of the Duke of Savoy and the King of Scotland. The Duke had to pay 25,000 écus in damages to the Scottish royal family.

=== Second marriage ===
Annabella returned to Scotland and married Lord George Gordon, son and heir of the 1st Earl of Huntly before 10 March 1460. After the death of her father-in-law on 15 July 1470, her husband became in the 2nd Earl, and Annabella the Countess of Huntly. However, shortly after the 2nd Earl instituted proceedings to have his marriage with Annabella annulled because she was related in the third and fourth degrees of consanguinity with his first wife, Elizabeth Dunbar, 8th Countess of Murray; the marriage was finally dissolved by the sentence pronounced on 24 July 1471.

== Issue ==
Annabella had children with her second husband the 2nd Earl of Huntly; two children are attributed to her:

- Lady Isabella Gordon (d. 1485), wife of William Hay, 3rd Earl of Erroll (d. 1507).
- Alexander Gordon, 3rd Earl of Huntly (died 21 January 1523/24). (Note: There still has been some uncertainty regarding Alexander's mother, whether she was Annabella Stewart or Elizabeth Hay. But the fact that his father married Elizabeth Hay in or about 12 May 1476 and that Alexander himself was a member of parliament, as well as being one of the Lords of the Articles in 1485, makes it chronologically implausible he could have been Elizabeth Hay's son; meaning most probably his mother was Annabella Stewart.)

However, there are other children of the 2nd Earl of Huntly whose maternity remained disputed; they could be children of either Annabella or the 2nd Earl's third and last wife (and previously mistress) Lady Elizabeth Hay:

- Adam Gordon, who married Lady Elizabeth de Moravia, daughter and heir of John de Moravia, 8th Earl of Sutherland, and in her right became Countess of Sutherland after her brother's death. Their son was Alexander Gordon, Master of Sutherland.
- William Gordon, married Janet Ogilvy and was the ancestor of the Gordons of Gight. (Note: George Gordon Byron, 6th Baron Byron claimed descent from Annabella through his mother Catherine, daughter of George Gordon, 12th Lord of Gight. Byron wrote: "By her [Annabella], he [the 2nd Earl of Huntly] left four sons: the third, Sir William Gordon, I have the honour to claim as one of my progenitors.")
- James Gordon, mentioned in an entail in 1498.
- Lady Janet Gordon, who married firstly, Alexander Lindsay, Master of Crawfurd; secondly, Patrick, Master of Gray (annulled); thirdly, Patrick Buttar of Gormark; and fourthly, James Halkerston of Southwood. She died before February 1559.
- Lady Elizabeth Gordon, who was contracted to marry William Keith, 3rd Earl Marischal, in 1481.

== Ancestry ==
Ancestors of Annabella of Scotland

8. Robert II of Scotland
4. Robert III of Scotland
9. Elizabeth Mure
2. James I of Scotland
10. Sir John Drummond, 11th of Lennox
5. Anabella Drummond
11. Mary Montifex
1. Annabella of Scotland
12. John of Gaunt, 1st Duke of Lancaster
6. John Beaufort, 1st Earl of Somerset
13. Katherine Swynford
3. Joan Beaufort
14. Thomas Holland, 2nd Earl of Kent
7. Margaret Holland
15. Alice FitzAlan

== Bibliography ==
- Guichenon, Samuel (1660). Histoire généalogique de la royale maison de Savoie, justifiée par titres, fondations de monastères, manuscrits, anciens monuments, histoires et autres preuves authentiques. Livres 1–2 /; enrichie de plusieurs portraits, sceaux, monnaies, sculptures et armoiries (in French). Lyon: G. Barbier. p. 1073.
- Priscilla Bawcutt, Bridget Henisch, Scots Abroad in the Fifteenth Century: The Princesses Margaret, Isabella and Eleanor, Elizabeth Ewan and Maureen M. Meikle (éd.), Women in Scotland, c.1100–1750, East Linton, Tuckwell, 1999, pp. 45–55. online
- Bonner, Elizabeth (1999). Scotland 'Auld Alliance' with France, 1295–1560. Vol. 84.
- Fiona Downie, La Voie Quelle Menace Tenir': Annabella Stewart, Scotland, and the European Marriage Market, 1444–56, The Scottish Historical Review, vol. 78, no. 206, 1999, pp. 170–191. JSTOR 25530900.
- Eva Pibiri, Histoire de femme, histoire d'Etat. Stratégie matrimoniale à la cour de Savoie pour la couronne de Chypre, 1455–1457 (in French), in Bollettino storico-bibliografico subalpino, 102/2 (2004), pp. 443–472. online
- Meredith Comba, Methods of queenship in matrimonial diplomacy: Fifteenth century Scottish royal women . Constellations, 2014, vol. 5, no 2.
