= Margaret Fordyce Dalrymple Hay =

Australian librarian (1893–1970)

Margaret Fordyce Dalrymple Hay (1889–1975) was an Australian librarian and administrator central to the operations of the University of Sydney Law School. She inspired the school's annual Margaret Dalrymple Hay Prize for Law, Lawyers and Justice.

== Early life ==
Born Christmas Eve 1889, Hay was the eldest of six children born to Richard Dalrymple Hay, surveyor, and his wife Bessie, née Cheesbrough, then living in Rushcutters Bay, Sydney.

== Career ==
In June 1919, Margaret was first employed as a typist in the Law School at the University of Sydney. By 1923, she was a clerk and the following year a Law Librarian, having taken on additional duties. As the majority of staff were part-time, Margaret assumed a central role in the faculty's administration, providing a vital link between students and academics. She proposed The Jubilee book of the Law School of the University of Sydney, 1890-1940 (1940) which records the first fifty years of the law school and during World War II was secretary for the Law School Comforts Fund, sending monthly parcels of books to law students serving in the forces. She also compiled the Legal Digest, a quarterly newsletter intertwining gossip about members of the profession with information on legislative changes. Keen to assist servicemen studying law by correspondence, she forwarded teaching materials and textbooks, and arranged tutoring and examinations.

Hay's career spanned the development of the Law School into a large postwar faculty, covering the changeover from John Peden's deanship to that of Kenneth Shatwell. During this period, she became an associate-member of the National Council of Women of New South Wales and joined the National (late United Australia) Party. She had several articles published in The Sydney Morning Herald and left behind several unpublished works including a biography of Sir Thomas Bavin and a history of T. J. Thompson's family and stockbroking firm, revealing both her dedication to the legal profession and her political conservatism. Hay retired in December 1953 with a holiday in England and spent the following 60's working part-time in the law library.

== Death ==
Hay died on 10 December 1975 in the Scottish Hospital, Paddington and was cremated.

== Recognition ==
Her work was officially acknowledged in 1946 by a group of ex-service law graduates and undergraduates, with part of their gift of 100 pounds forming the foundation of the annual Margaret Dalrymple Hay Prize for Law, Lawyers and Justice.
