= List of peers 1490–1499 =

This page lists all peers who held extant titles between 1490 and 1499.

== Peerage of England ==
Title	Holder	Date gained	Date lost	Notes
Duke of Cornwall (1337)	Arthur Tudor	1486	1502	
Duke of Buckingham (1444)	Edward Stafford, 3rd Duke of Buckingham	1485	1521	
Duke of Suffolk (1448)	John de la Pole, 2nd Duke of Suffolk	1450	1491	Died
Duke of Suffolk (1448)	Edmund de la Pole, 3rd Duke of Suffolk	1491	1493	Surrendered the Dukedom
Duke of Norfolk (1483)	none	1485	1514	Attainted
Duke of Bedford (1485)	Jasper Tudor, 1st Duke of Bedford	1485	1495	Died, title extinct
Duke of York (1494)	Henry Tudor	1494	1509	New creation
Duke of Somerset (1499)	Edmund Tudor, Duke of Somerset	1499	1500	New creation; died; title extinct
Marquess of Dorset (1475)	Thomas Grey, 1st Marquess of Dorset	1475	1501	
Marquess of Berkeley (1489)	William de Berkeley, 1st Marquess of Berkeley	1489	1492	Died, title extinct
Earl of Warwick (1088)	Anne Neville, 16th Countess of Warwick	1448	1492	Died
Earl of Warwick (1088)	Edward Plantagenet, 17th Earl of Warwick	1492	1499	Attainted, and his honours became forfeited
Earl of Arundel (1138)	Thomas FitzAlan, 17th Earl of Arundel	1487	1524	
Earl of Oxford (1142)	John de Vere, 13th Earl of Oxford	1485	1513	
Earl of Westmorland (1397)	Ralph Neville, 3rd Earl of Westmorland	1484	1499	Died
Earl of Westmorland (1397)	Ralph Neville, 4th Earl of Westmorland	1499	1549	
Earl of Northumberland (1416)	Henry Percy, 5th Earl of Northumberland	1489	1527	
Earl of Shrewsbury (1442)	George Talbot, 4th Earl of Shrewsbury	1473	1538	
Earl of Essex (1461)	Henry Bourchier, 2nd Earl of Essex	1483	1540	
Earl of Kent (1465)	Edmund Grey, 1st Earl of Kent	1465	1490	Died
Earl of Kent (1465)	George Grey, 2nd Earl of Kent	1490	1505	
Earl Rivers (1465)	Richard Woodville, 3rd Earl Rivers	1483	1491	Died, title extinct
Earl of Wiltshire (1470)	Edward Stafford, 2nd Earl of Wiltshire	1473	1499	Died, title extinct
Earl of Winchester (1472)	Lewis de Bruges, 1st Earl of Winchester	1472	1492	Died
Earl of Winchester (1472)	John de Bruges, 2nd Earl of Winchester	1492	1500	Resigned the Peerage
Earl of Huntingdon (1479)	William Herbert, 1st Earl of Huntingdon	1479	1491	Died, title extinct
Earl of Surrey (1483)	Thomas Howard, 1st Earl of Surrey	1483	1524	
Earl of Devon (1485)	Edward Courtenay, 1st Earl of Devon	1485	1509	
Earl of Derby (1485)	Thomas Stanley, 1st Earl of Derby	1485	1504	
Viscount Beaumont (1440)	William Beaumont, 2nd Viscount Beaumont	1460	1507	
Viscount Lisle (1483)	Edward Grey, 1st Viscount Lisle	1483	1492	Died
Viscount Lisle (1483)	John Grey, 2nd Viscount Lisle	1492	1504	
Viscount Welles (1487)	John Welles, Viscount Welles	1487	1499	Died, title extinct
Baron de Ros (1264)	Edmund de Ros, 10th Baron de Ros	1464	1508	
Baron Dynham (1295)	John Dynham, 8th or 1st Baron Dynham	1467	1501	
Baron Fauconberg (1295)	Joan Neville, 6th Baroness Fauconberg	1429	1490	Died, Barony fell into abeyance until 1903
Baron FitzWalter (1295)	John Radcliffe, 9th Baron FitzWalter	1485	1496	Attainted, and his honours became forfeited
Baron FitzWarine (1295)	John Bourchier, 11th Baron FitzWarin	1479	1539	
Baron Grey de Wilton (1295)	Reginald Grey, 7th Baron Grey de Wilton	1442	1493	Died
Baron Grey de Wilton (1295)	John Grey, 8th Baron Grey de Wilton	1493	1498	
Baron Grey de Wilton (1295)	Edmund Grey, 9th Baron Grey de Wilton	1498	1511	
Baron Clinton (1299)	John Clinton, 7th Baron Clinton	1488	1514	
Baron De La Warr (1299)	Thomas West, 8th Baron De La Warr	1476	1525	
Baron Ferrers of Chartley (1299)	John Devereux, 9th Baron Ferrers of Chartley	1468	1501	
Baron de Clifford (1299)	Henry Clifford, 10th Baron de Clifford	1485	1523	
Baron Morley (1299)	Alice Parker, 9th Baroness Morley	1489	1518	
Baron Strange of Knockyn (1299)	Joan le Strange, 9th Baroness Strange	1470	1514	
Baron Zouche of Haryngworth (1308)	John la Zouche, 7th Baron Zouche	1468	1526	Attainder reversed in 1495
Baron Audley of Heleigh (1313)	John Tuchet, 6th Baron Audley	1459	1490	Died
Baron Audley of Heleigh (1313)	James Tuchet, 7th Baron Audley	1490	1497	Died, title became forfeited
Baron Cobham of Kent (1313)	John Brooke, 7th Baron Cobham	1464	1512	
Baron Willoughby de Eresby (1313)	Christopher Willoughby, 10th Baron Willoughby de Eresby	1475	1499	Died
Baron Willoughby de Eresby (1313)	William Willoughby, 11th Baron Willoughby de Eresby	1499	1526	
Baron Dacre (1321)	Thomas Fiennes, 8th Baron Dacre	1486	1534	
Baron FitzHugh (1321)	George FitzHugh, 7th Baron FitzHugh	1487	1513	
Baron Greystock (1321)	Elizabeth Dacre, 6th Baroness Greystoke	1487	1516	
Baron Harington (1326)	Cecily Bonville, 7th Baroness Harington	1460	1530	
Baron Scrope of Masham (1350)	Thomas Scrope, 6th Baron Scrope of Masham	1475	1493	Died
Baron Scrope of Masham (1350)	Alice Scrope, 7th Baroness Scrope of Masham	1493	1502	
Baron Botreaux (1368)	Mary Hungerford, 5th Baroness Botreaux	1477	1529	
Baron Scrope of Bolton (1371)	John Scrope, 5th Baron Scrope of Bolton	1459	1498	Died
Baron Scrope of Bolton (1371)	Henry Scrope, 6th Baron Scrope of Bolton	1498	1506	
Baron Cromwell (1375)	Maud Stanhope, 4th Baroness Cromwell	1490	1497	Abeyance terminated in 1490; Died, Barony fell into abeyance again, until terminated in 1923
Baron Lumley (1384)	George Lumley, 3rd Baron Lumley	1480	1508	
Baron Bergavenny (1392)	George Nevill, 4th Baron Bergavenny	1447	1492	Died
Baron Bergavenny (1392)	George Nevill, 5th Baron Bergavenny	1492	1536	
Baron Grey of Codnor (1397)	Henry Grey, 4th Baron Grey of Codnor	1444	1496	Died, Barony fell into abeyance until 1989
Baron Berkeley (1421)	Maurice Berkeley, 3rd Baron Berkeley	1492	1506	Title previously held by the Marquess of Berkeley
Baron Latimer (1432)	Richard Neville, 2nd Baron Latimer	1469	1530	
Baron Dudley (1440)	Edward Sutton, 2nd Baron Dudley	1487	1532	
Baron Lisle (1444)	John Grey, 4th Baron Lisle	1487	1504	
Baron Saye and Sele (1447)	Richard Fiennes, 4th Baron Saye and Sele	1476	1501	
Baron Beauchamp of Powick (1447)	Richard Beauchamp, 2nd Baron Beauchamp	1475	1503	
Baron Stourton (1448)	William Stourton, 5th Baron Stourton	1487	1523	
Baron Berners (1455)	John Bourchier, 2nd Baron Berners	1474	1533	
Baron Hastings de Hastings (1461)	Edward Hastings, 2nd Baron Hastings	1483	1506	
Baron Herbert (1461)	Elizabeth Somerset, Baroness Herbert	1490	1514	Title previously held by the Earls of Pembroke
Baron Ogle (1461)	Ralph Ogle, 3rd Baron Ogle	1485	1513	
Baron Mountjoy (1465)	William Blount, 4th Baron Mountjoy	1485	1534	
Baron Dacre of Gilsland (1473)	Thomas Dacre, 2nd Baron Dacre	1485	1525	
Baron Grey of Powis (1482)	John Grey, 1st Baron Grey of Powis	1482	1497	Died
Baron Grey of Powis (1482)	John Grey, 2nd Baron Grey of Powis	1497	1504	
Baron Daubeney (1486)	Giles Daubeney, 1st Baron Daubeney	1486	1507	
Baron Cheyne (1487)	John Cheyne, Baron Cheyne	1487	1499	Died, title extinct
Baron Willoughby de Broke (1491)	Robert Willoughby, 1st Baron Willoughby de Broke	1492	1502	New creation
Baron Ormond of Rochford (1495)	Thomas Butler, 1st Baron Ormond of Rochford	1495	1515	New creation; also Earl of Ormond in the Peerage of Ireland

== Peerage of Scotland ==
Title	Holder	Date gained	Date lost	Notes
Duke of Rothesay (1398)	-	1488	1507	
Duke of Ross (1488)	James Stewart, Duke of Ross	1488	1504	
Duke of Montrose (1489)	David Lindsay, 1st Duke of Montrose	1489	1495	Died, title extinct
Earl of Sutherland (1235)	John de Moravia, 8th Earl of Sutherland	1460	1508	
Earl of Angus (1389)	Archibald Douglas, 5th Earl of Angus	1463	1513	
Earl of Crawford (1398)	John Lindsay, 6th Earl of Crawford	1495	1513	Title previously held by the Duke of Montrose
Earl of Menteith (1427)	Malise Graham, 1st Earl of Menteith	1427	1490	Died
Earl of Menteith (1427)	Alexander Graham, 2nd Earl of Menteith	1490	1537	
Earl of Huntly (1445)	George Gordon, 2nd Earl of Huntly	1470	1501	
Earl of Erroll (1452)	William Hay, 3rd Earl of Erroll	1470	1507	
Earl of Caithness (1455)	William Sinclair, 2nd Earl of Caithness	1476	1513	
Earl of Argyll (1457)	Colin Campbell, 1st Earl of Argyll	1457	1493	Died
Earl of Argyll (1457)	Archibald Campbell, 2nd Earl of Argyll	1493	1513	New creation
Earl of Atholl (1457)	John Stewart, 1st Earl of Atholl	1457	1512	
Earl of Morton (1458)	James Douglas, 1st Earl of Morton	1458	1493	Died
Earl of Morton (1458)	John Douglas, 2nd Earl of Morton	1493	1513	
Earl of Rothes (1458)	George Leslie, 1st Earl of Rothes	1458	1490	Died
Earl of Rothes (1458)	George Leslie, 2nd Earl of Rothes	1490	1513	
Earl Marischal (1458)	William Keith, 3rd Earl Marischal	1483	1530	
Earl of Buchan (1469)	James Stewart, 1st Earl of Buchan	1469	1499	Died
Earl of Buchan (1469)	Alexander Stewart, 2nd Earl of Buchan	1469	1505	
Earl of Mar and Garioch (1486)	John Stewart, Earl of Mar and Garioch	1485	1503	
Earl of Glencairn (1488)	Robert Cunningham, 2nd Earl of Glencairn	1488	1490	De jure Earl; died
Earl of Glencairn (1488)	Cuthbert Cunningham, 3rd Earl of Glencairn	1490	1541	De jure Earl, until 1503
Earl of Bothwell (1488)	Patrick Hepburn, 1st Earl of Bothwell	1488	1508	
Earl of Lennox (1488)	John Stewart, 1st Earl of Lennox	1488	1495	Died
Earl of Lennox (1488)	Matthew Stewart, 2nd Earl of Lennox	1495	1513	
Lord Erskine (1429)	Thomas Erskine, 2nd Lord Erskine	1453	1494	de jure Earl of Mar; died
Lord Erskine (1429)	Alexander Erskine, 3rd Lord Erskine	1494	1509	de jure Earl of Mar
Lord Somerville (1430)	John Somerville, 3rd Lord Somerville	1456	1491	Died
Lord Somerville (1430)	John Somerville, 4th Lord Somerville	1491	1523	
Lord Haliburton of Dirleton (1441)	George Haliburton, 4th Lord Haliburton of Dirleton	1459	1492	Died
Lord Haliburton of Dirleton (1441)	James Haliburton, 5th Lord Haliburton of Dirleton	1492	1502	
Lord Forbes (1442)	Alexander Forbes, 4th Lord Forbes	1483	1491	Died
Lord Forbes (1442)	Arthur Forbes, 5th Lord Forbes	1491	1493	
Lord Forbes (1442)	John Forbes, 6th Lord Forbes	1493	1547	
Lord Hamilton (1445)	James Hamilton, 2nd Lord Hamilton	1479	1529	
Lord Maxwell (1445)	John Maxwell, 3rd Lord Maxwell	1485	1513	
Lord Glamis (1445)	John Lyon, 3rd Lord Glamis	1486	1497	Died
Lord Glamis (1445)	John Lyon, 4th Lord Glamis	1497	1500	
Lord Graham (1445)	William Graham, 3rd Lord Graham	1472	1513	
Lord Lindsay of the Byres (1445)	David Lindsay, 2nd Lord Lindsay	1482	1490	Died
Lord Lindsay of the Byres (1445)	John Lindsay, 3rd Lord Lindsay	1490	1497	Died
Lord Lindsay of the Byres (1445)	Patrick Lindsay, 4th Lord Lindsay	1497	1526	
Lord Saltoun (1445)	James Abernethy, 3rd Lord Saltoun	1488	1505	
Lord Gray (1445)	Andrew Gray, 2nd Lord Gray	1469	1514	
Lord Montgomerie (1449)	Hugh Montgomerie, 2nd Lord Montgomerie	1470	1545	
Lord Sinclair (1449)	Henry Sinclair, 3rd Lord Sinclair	1487	1513	
Lord Fleming (1451)	Robert Fleming, 1st Lord Fleming	1451	1494	Died
Lord Fleming (1451)	John Fleming, 2nd Lord Fleming	1494	1524	
Lord Seton (1451)	George Seton, 2nd Lord Seton	1478	1508	
Lord Borthwick (1452)	William Borthwick, 3rd Lord Borthwick	1484	1503	
Lord Boyd (1454)	Alexander Boyd, 3rd Lord Boyd	1482	Aft. 1508	
Lord Oliphant (1455)	Laurence Oliphant, 1st Lord Oliphant	1455	1498	Died
Lord Oliphant (1455)	John Oliphant, 2nd Lord Oliphant	1498	1516	
Lord Kennedy (1457)	John Kennedy, 2nd Lord Kennedy	1489	1509	
Lord Livingston (1458)	James Livingston, 2nd Lord Livingston	1467	1497	Died
Lord Livingston (1458)	James Livingston, 3rd Lord Livingston	1497	1503	
Lord Cathcart (1460)	Alan Cathcart, 1st Lord Cathcart	1460	1497	Died
Lord Cathcart (1460)	John Cathcart, 2nd Lord Cathcart	1497	1535	
Lord Lovat (1464)	Hugh Fraser, 1st Lord Lovat	1464	1500	
Lord Innermeath (1470)	Thomas Stewart, 2nd Lord Innermeath	1489	1513	
Lord Carlyle of Torthorwald (1473)	John Carlyle, 1st Lord Carlyle	1473	1501	
Lord Home (1473)	Alexander Home, 1st Lord Home	1473	1490	Died
Lord Home (1473)	Alexander Home, 2nd Lord Home	1490	1506	
Lord of the Isles (1476)	John of Islay, 1st Lord of the Isles	1476	1498	Died; title forfeit
Lord Ruthven (1488)	William Ruthven, 1st Lord Ruthven	1488	1528	
Lord Crichton of Sanquhar (1488)	Robert Crichton, 1st Lord Crichton of Sanquhar	1488	1494	Died
Lord Crichton of Sanquhar (1488)	Robert Crichton, 2nd Lord Crichton of Sanquhar	1494	1513	
Lord Drummond of Cargill (1488)	John Drummond, 1st Lord Drummond	1488	1519	
Lord Hay of Yester (1488)	John Hay, 1st Lord Hay of Yester	1488	1508	
Lord Sempill (1489)	John Sempill, 1st Lord Sempill	1489	1513	
Lord Herries of Terregles (1490)	Herbert Herries, 1st Lord Herries of Terregles	1490	1505	New creation
Lord Ogilvy of Airlie (1491)	James Ogilvy, 1st Lord Ogilvy of Airlie	1491	1504	New creation
Lord Ross (1499)	John Ross, 1st Lord Ross	1499	1501	New creation

== Peerage of Ireland ==
Title	Holder	Date gained	Date lost	Notes
Earl of Kildare (1316)	Gerald FitzGerald, 8th Earl of Kildare	1478	1513	
Earl of Ormond (1328)	Thomas Butler, 7th Earl of Ormond	1478	1515	
Earl of Desmond (1329)	Maurice FitzGerald, 9th Earl of Desmond	1487	1520	
Earl of Waterford (1446)	George Talbot, 4th Earl of Waterford	1473	1538	
Viscount Gormanston (1478)	Robert Preston, 1st Viscount Gormanston	1478	1503	
Baron Athenry (1172)	Thomas III de Bermingham	1473	1500	
Baron Kingsale (1223)	James de Courcy, 13th Baron Kingsale	1476	1499	Died
Baron Kingsale (1223)	Edmond de Courcy, 14th Baron Kingsale	1499	1505	
Baron Kerry (1223)	Edmond Fitzmaurice, 9th Baron Kerry	1469	1498	Died
Baron Kerry (1223)	Edmond Fitzmaurice, 10th Baron Kerry	1498	1543	
Baron Barry (1261)	William Barry, 11th Baron Barry	1488	1500	
Baron Slane (1370)	James Fleming, 7th Baron Slane	1470	1492	Died
Baron Slane (1370)	Christopher Fleming, 8th Baron Slane	1492	1517	
Baron Howth (1425)	Nicholas St Lawrence, 4th Baron Howth	1485	1526	
Baron Killeen (1449)	Edmond Plunkett, 4th Baron Killeen	1469	1510	
Baron Trimlestown (1461)	Christopher Barnewall, 2nd Baron Trimlestown	1470	1513	
Baron Dunsany (1462)	John Plunkett, 3rd Baron of Dunsany	1480	1500	
Baron Portlester (1462)	Rowland FitzEustace, 1st Baron Portlester	1462	1496	Died, title extinct
Baron Delvin (1486)	Richard Nugent, 1st Baron Delvin	1486	1537	

Preceded by List of peers 1480–1489	Lists of peers by decade 1490–1499	Succeeded by List of peers 1500–1509
