= List of peers 1480–1489 =

This page lists all peers who held extant titles between 1480 and 1489.

== Peerage of England ==
Title	Holder	Date gained	Date lost	Notes
Duke of Cornwall (1337)	Edward Plantagenet	1470/1471	1483	Ascended the Throne, when all his honours merged in the Crown
Duke of Cornwall (1337)	None	1483	1483	during the reign of Edward V.
Duke of Cornwall (1337)	Edward of Middleham	1483	1484	Died, and his peerage dignities lapsed to the Crown
Duke of Cornwall (1337)	None	1484	1486	-
Duke of Cornwall (1337)	Arthur Tudor	1486	1502	
Duke of Buckingham (1444)	Henry Stafford, 2nd Duke of Buckingham	1460	1483	Attainted
Duke of Buckingham (1444)	Edward Stafford, 3rd Duke of Buckingham	1485	1521	Restored
Duke of Suffolk (1448)	John de la Pole, 2nd Duke of Suffolk	1450	1491	
Duke of Gloucester (1461)	Richard Plantagenet, 1st Duke of Gloucester	1461	1483	Ascended the Throne, when all his honours merged in the Crown
Duke of York (1474)	Richard of Shrewsbury, 1st Duke of York	1474	1483	1st Duke of Norfolk, 1st Earl of Nottingham, 1st Earl Warenne; Died, titles became extinct
Duke of Norfolk (1483)	John Howard, 1st Duke of Norfolk	1483	1485	New creation; attainted and his honours became forfeited
Duke of Bedford (1485)	Jasper Tudor, 1st Duke of Bedford	1485	1495	New creation; restored as Earl of Pembroke
Marquess of Dorset (1475)	Thomas Grey, 1st Marquess of Dorset	1475	1501	
Marquess of Berkeley (1489)	William de Berkeley, 1st Marquess of Berkeley	1489	1492	New creation; Earl of Nottingham in 1483, Viscount Berkeley in 1481
Earl of Warwick (1088)	Anne Neville, 16th Countess of Warwick	1448	1492	
Earl of Arundel (1138)	William FitzAlan, 16th Earl of Arundel	1438	1487	Died
Earl of Arundel (1138)	Thomas FitzAlan, 17th Earl of Arundel	1487	1524	
Earl of Oxford (1142)	John de Vere, 13th Earl of Oxford	1485	1513	Restored
Earl of Norfolk (1312)	Anne de Mowbray, 8th Countess of Norfolk	1476	1481	Died, title extinct
Earl of Westmorland (1397)	Ralph Neville, 2nd Earl of Westmorland	1425	1484	Died
Earl of Westmorland (1397)	Ralph Neville, 3rd Earl of Westmorland	1484	1499	
Earl of Northumberland (1416)	Henry Percy, 4th Earl of Northumberland	1470	1489	Died
Earl of Northumberland (1416)	Henry Percy, 5th Earl of Northumberland	1489	1527	
Earl of Shrewsbury (1442)	George Talbot, 4th Earl of Shrewsbury	1473	1538	
Earl of Worcester (1449)	Edward Tiptoft, 2nd Earl of Worcester	1471	1485	Died, Earldom extinct
Earl of Richmond (1452)	Henry Tudor, Earl of Richmond	1456	1485	Ascended the Throne, when all his honours merged in the Crown
Earl of Essex (1461)	Henry Bourchier, 1st Earl of Essex	1461	1483	Died
Earl of Essex (1461)	Henry Bourchier, 2nd Earl of Essex	1483	1540	
Earl of Kent (1465)	Edmund Grey, 1st Earl of Kent	1465	1490	
Earl Rivers (1465)	Anthony Woodville, 2nd Earl Rivers	1469	1483	Died
Earl Rivers (1465)	Richard Woodville, 3rd Earl Rivers	1483	1491	
Earl of Lincoln (1467)	John de la Pole, 1st Earl of Lincoln	1467	1487	Died, title extinct
Earl of Wiltshire (1470)	Edward Stafford, 2nd Earl of Wiltshire	1473	1499	
Earl of Winchester (1472)	Lewis de Bruges, 1st Earl of Winchester	1472	1492	
Earl of Salisbury (1478)	Edward Plantagenet, Earl of Salisbury	1476	1484	Became Duke of Cornwall in 1483, see above
Earl of Huntingdon (1479)	William Herbert, 1st Earl of Huntingdon	1479	1491	
Earl of Surrey (1483)	Thomas Howard, 1st Earl of Surrey	1483	1491	New creation; Attainted 1485-1490
Earl of Devon (1485)	Edward Courtenay, 1st Earl of Devon	1485	1509	New creation
Earl of Derby (1485)	Thomas Stanley, 1st Earl of Derby	1485	1504	New creation
Earl of Bath (1486)	Philibert de Chandée, 1st Earl of Bath	1486	14??	New creation; died, title extinct
Viscount Beaumont (1440)	William Beaumont, 2nd Viscount Beaumont	1460	1507	Attainted 1471-1485
Viscount Lisle (1483)	Edward Grey, 1st Viscount Lisle	1483	1492	New creation
Viscount Lovell (1483)	Francis Lovell, 1st Viscount Lovell	1483	1487	New creation; died, title extinct
Viscount Welles (1487)	John Welles, 1st Viscount Welles	1487	1499	New creation
Baron de Ros (1264)	Edmund de Ros, 10th Baron de Ros	1464	1508	Restored in 1485
Baron Dynham (1295)	John Dynham, 8th or 1st Baron Dynham	1467	1501	
Baron Fauconberg (1295)	Joan Neville, 6th Baroness Fauconberg	1429	1490	
Baron FitzWalter (1295)	Elizabeth Radcliffe, suo jure Baroness FitzWalter	1431	1485	Died
Baron FitzWalter (1295)	John Radcliffe, 9th Baron FitzWalter	1485	1496	
Baron FitzWarine (1295)	John Bourchier, 11th Baron FitzWarin	1479	1539	
Baron Grey de Wilton (1295)	Reginald Grey, 7th Baron Grey de Wilton	1442	1493	
Baron Clinton (1299)	John Clinton, 6th Baron Clinton	1464	1488	Died
Baron Clinton (1299)	John Clinton, 7th Baron Clinton	1488	1514	
Baron De La Warr (1299)	Thomas West, 8th Baron De La Warr	1476	1525	
Baron Ferrers of Chartley (1299)	John Devereux, 9th Baron Ferrers of Chartley	1468	1501	
Baron Lovel (1299)	Francis Lovel, 9th Baron Lovel	1465	1485	Created Viscount Lovel 1483, titles forfeit 1485
Baron de Clifford (1299)	Henry Clifford, 10th Baron de Clifford	1485	1523	Attainder reversed
Baron Ferrers of Groby (1299)	Elizabeth Ferrers, 6th Baroness Ferrers of Groby	1445	1483	Died, Barony succeeded by her son, the Marquess of Dorset, and held by his heirs until 1554, when it became forfeited
Baron Morley (1299)	Henry Lovel, 8th Baron Morley	1476	1489	Died
Baron Morley (1299)	Alice Parker, 9th Baroness Morley	1489	1518	
Baron Strange of Knockyn (1299)	Joan le Strange, 9th Baroness Strange	1470	1514	
Baron Zouche of Haryngworth (1308)	John la Zouche, 7th Baron Zouche	1468	1526	Attainted in 1485
Baron Audley of Heleigh (1313)	John Tuchet, 6th Baron Audley	1459	1490	
Baron Cobham of Kent (1313)	John Brooke, 7th Baron Cobham	1464	1512	
Baron Willoughby de Eresby (1313)	Christopher Willoughby, 10th Baron Willoughby de Eresby	1475	1499	
Baron Dacre (1321)	Joan Dacre, 7th Baroness Dacre	1458	1486	Died
Baron Dacre (1321)	Thomas Fiennes, 8th Baron Dacre	1486	1534	
Baron FitzHugh (1321)	Richard FitzHugh, 6th Baron FitzHugh	1472	1487	Died
Baron FitzHugh (1321)	George FitzHugh, 7th Baron FitzHugh	1487	1513	
Baron Greystock (1321)	Ralph de Greystock, 5th Baron Greystock	1436	1487	Died
Baron Greystock (1321)	Elizabeth Dacre, 6th Baroness Greystoke	1487	1516	
Baron Harington (1326)	Cecily Bonville, 7th Baroness Harington	1460	1530	
Baron Poynings (1337)	Eleanor Percy, 6th Baroness Poynings	1446	1482	Died, Barony succeeded by the Earl of Northumberland, and held by his heirs
Baron Scrope of Masham (1350)	Thomas Scrope, 6th Baron Scrope of Masham	1475	1493	
Baron Botreaux (1368)	Mary Hungerford, 5th Baroness Botreaux	1477	1529	Baroness Hungerford in 1485
Baron Scrope of Bolton (1371)	John Scrope, 5th Baron Scrope of Bolton	1459	1498	
Baron Lumley (1384)	Thomas Lumley, 2nd Baron Lumley	1461	1480	Died
Baron Lumley (1384)	George Lumley, 3rd Baron Lumley	1480	1508	
Baron Bergavenny (1392)	George Nevill, 4th Baron Bergavenny	1447	1492	
Baron Grey of Codnor (1397)	Henry Grey, 4th Baron Grey of Codnor	1444	1496	
Baron Berkeley (1421)	William de Berkeley, 2nd Baron Berkeley	1463	1492	Created Marquess of Berkeley, Earl of Nottingham and Viscount Berkeley, see above
Baron Latimer (1432)	Richard Neville, 2nd Baron Latimer	1469	1530	
Baron Dudley (1440)	John Sutton, 1st Baron Dudley	1440	1487	Died
Baron Dudley (1440)	Edward Sutton, 2nd Baron Dudley	1487	1532	
Baron Lisle (1444)	Elizabeth Talbot, 3rd Baroness Lisle	1475	1487	Died
Baron Lisle (1444)	John Grey, 4th Baron Lisle	1487	1504	
Baron Saye and Sele (1447)	Richard Fiennes, 4th Baron Saye and Sele	1476	1501	
Baron Beauchamp of Powick (1447)	Richard Beauchamp, 2nd Baron Beauchamp	1475	1503	
Baron Stourton (1448)	John Stourton, 3rd Baron Stourton	1479	1485	Died
Baron Stourton (1448)	Francis Stourton, 4th Baron Stourton	1485	1487	
Baron Stourton (1448)	William Stourton, 5th Baron Stourton	1487	1523	
Baron Berners (1455)	John Bourchier, 2nd Baron Berners	1474	1533	
Baron Stanley (1456)	Thomas Stanley, 2nd Baron Stanley	1459	1504	Created Earl of Derby in 1485, Barony held by his heirs until 1594, when it fell into abeyance
Baron Neville (1459)	Ralph Neville, 2nd Baron Neville	1472	1499	Succeeded as Earl of Westmorland, Barony held by his heirs until 1571, when it was attainted
Baron Hastings de Hastings (1461)	William Hastings, 1st Baron Hastings	1461	1483	Died
Baron Hastings de Hastings (1461)	Edward Hastings, 2nd Baron Hastings	1483	1506	Created Baron Hastings of Hungerford in 1482
Baron Ogle (1461)	Owen Ogle, 2nd Baron Ogle	1469	1485	Died
Baron Ogle (1461)	Ralph Ogle, 3rd Baron Ogle	1485	1513	
Baron Mountjoy (1465)	John Blount, 3rd Baron Mountjoy	1475	1485	Died
Baron Mountjoy (1465)	William Blount, 4th Baron Mountjoy	1485	1534	
Baron Howard (1470)	John Howard, 1st Baron Howard	1470	1485	Created Duke of Norfolk in 1483; Barony forfeited in 1485
Baron Dacre of Gilsland (1473)	Humphrey Dacre, 1st Baron Dacre	1473	1485	Died
Baron Dacre of Gilsland (1473)	Thomas Dacre, 2nd Baron Dacre	1485	1525	
Baron Grey of Powis (1482)	John Grey, 1st Baron Grey of Powis	1482	1497	New creation
Baron Daubeney (1486)	Giles Daubeney, 1st Baron Daubeney	1486	1507	New creation
Baron Cheyne (1487)	John Cheyne, Baron Cheyne	1487	1499	New creation

== Peerage of Scotland ==
Title	Holder	Date gained	Date lost	Notes
Duke of Rothesay (1398)	James Stewart, Duke of Rothesay	1473	1488	Acceded to the Throne of Scotland
Duke of Albany (1456)	Alexander Stewart, Duke of Albany	1456	1483	Forfeited
Duke of Ross (1488)	James Stewart, Duke of Ross	1488	1504	New creation; also Earl of Ross in 1481
Duke of Montrose (1489)	David Lindsay, 1st Duke of Montrose	1489	1495	New creation, for life only
Earl of Sutherland (1235)	John de Moravia, 8th Earl of Sutherland	1460	1508	
Earl of Angus (1389)	Archibald Douglas, 5th Earl of Angus	1463	1513	
Earl of Crawford (1398)	David Lindsay, 5th Earl of Crawford	1453	1495	Created Duke of Ross in 1488, see above
Earl of Menteith (1427)	Malise Graham, 1st Earl of Menteith	1427	1490	
Earl of Huntly (1445)	George Gordon, 2nd Earl of Huntly	1470	1501	
Earl of Erroll (1452)	William Hay, 3rd Earl of Erroll	1470	1507	
Earl of Caithness (1455)	William Sinclair, 2nd Earl of Caithness	1476	1513	
Earl of Argyll (1457)	Colin Campbell, 1st Earl of Argyll	1457	1493	
Earl of Atholl (1457)	John Stewart, 1st Earl of Atholl	1457	1512	
Earl of Morton (1458)	James Douglas, 1st Earl of Morton	1458	1493	
Earl of Rothes (1458)	George Leslie, 1st Earl of Rothes	1458	1490	
Earl Marischal (1458)	William Keith, 2nd Earl Marischal	1463	1483	Died
Earl Marischal (1458)	William Keith, 3rd Earl Marischal	1483	1530	
Earl of Buchan (1469)	James Stewart, 1st Earl of Buchan	1469	1499	
Earl of Mar and Garioch (1486)	John Stewart, Earl of Mar and Garioch	1485	1503	New creation
Earl of Glencairn (1488)	Alexander Cunningham, 1st Earl of Glencairn	1488	1488	New creation; died
Earl of Glencairn (1488)	Robert Cunningham, 2nd Earl of Glencairn	1488	1490	De jure Earl
Earl of Bothwell (1488)	Patrick Hepburn, 1st Earl of Bothwell	1488	1508	New creation
Earl of Lennox (1488)	John Stewart, 1st Earl of Lennox	1488	1495	New creation
Lord Erskine (1429)	Thomas Erskine, 2nd Lord Erskine	1453	1494	de jure Earl of Mar
Lord Somerville (1430)	John Somerville, 3rd Lord Somerville	1456	1491	
Lord Haliburton of Dirleton (1441)	George Haliburton, 4th Lord Haliburton of Dirleton	1459	1492	
Lord Forbes (1442)	William Forbes, 3rd Lord Forbes	1462	1483	Died
Lord Forbes (1442)	Alexander Forbes, 4th Lord Forbes	1483	1491	
Lord Crichton (1443)	William Crichton, 3rd Lord Crichton	1454	1484	Title forfeited
Lord Hamilton (1445)	James Hamilton, 2nd Lord Hamilton	1479	1529	
Lord Maxwell (1445)	Robert Maxwell, 2nd Lord Maxwell	1454	1485	Died
Lord Maxwell (1445)	John Maxwell, 3rd Lord Maxwell	1485	1513	
Lord Glamis (1445)	Alexander Lyon, 2nd Lord Glamis	1459	1486	Died
Lord Glamis (1445)	John Lyon, 3rd Lord Glamis	1486	1497	
Lord Graham (1445)	William Graham, 3rd Lord Graham	1472	1513	
Lord Lindsay of the Byres (1445)	John Lindsay, 1st Lord Lindsay	1445	1482	Died
Lord Lindsay of the Byres (1445)	David Lindsay, 2nd Lord Lindsay	1482	1490	
Lord Saltoun (1445)	William Abernethy, 2nd Lord Saltoun	1460	1488	Died
Lord Saltoun (1445)	James Abernethy, 3rd Lord Saltoun	1488	1505	
Lord Gray (1445)	Andrew Gray, 2nd Lord Gray	1469	1514	
Lord Montgomerie (1449)	Hugh Montgomerie, 2nd Lord Montgomerie	1470	1545	
Lord Sinclair (1449)	William Sinclair, 1st Lord Sinclair	1449	1484	Died
Lord Sinclair (1449)	William Sinclair, 2nd Lord Sinclair	1484	1487	Died
Lord Sinclair (1449)	Henry Sinclair, 3rd Lord Sinclair	1487	1513	
Lord Fleming (1451)	Robert Fleming, 1st Lord Fleming	1451	1494	
Lord Seton (1451)	George Seton, 2nd Lord Seton	1478	1508	
Lord Borthwick (1452)	William Borthwick, 2nd Lord Borthwick	1470	1484	Died
Lord Borthwick (1452)	William Borthwick, 3rd Lord Borthwick	1484	1503	
Lord Boyd (1454)	Robert Boyd, 1st Lord Boyd	1454	1482	Died
Lord Boyd (1454)	James Boyd, 2nd Lord Boyd	1482	1484	Died
Lord Boyd (1454)	Alexander Boyd, 3rd Lord Boyd	1482	Aft. 1508	
Lord Oliphant (1455)	Laurence Oliphant, 1st Lord Oliphant	1455	1498	
Lord Kennedy (1457)	Gilbert Kennedy, 1st Lord Kennedy	1457	1489	Died
Lord Kennedy (1457)	John Kennedy, 2nd Lord Kennedy	1489	1509	
Lord Livingston (1458)	James Livingston, 2nd Lord Livingston	1467	1497	
Lord Hailes (1458)	Patrick Hepburn, 1st Lord Hailes	1458	1483	Died
Lord Hailes (1458)	Patrick Hepburn, 2nd Lord Hailes	1483	1508	Created Earl of Bothwell, see above
Lord Avandale (1459)	Andrew Stewart, 1st Lord Avandale	1459	1488	Died, title extinct
Lord Cathcart (1460)	Alan Cathcart, 1st Lord Cathcart	1460	1497	
Lord Darnley (1460)	John Stewart, 1st Baron Darnley	1460	1495	Created Earl of Lennox, see above
Lord Lovat (1464)	Hugh Fraser, 1st Lord Lovat	1464	1500	
Lord Innermeath (1470)	Walter Stewart, 1st Lord Innermeath	1470	1489	Died
Lord Innermeath (1470)	Thomas Stewart, 2nd Lord Innermeath	1489	1513	
Lord Carlyle of Torthorwald (1473)	John Carlyle, 1st Lord Carlyle	1473	1501	
Lord Home (1473)	Alexander Home, 1st Lord Home	1473	1490	
Lord of the Isles (1476)	John of Islay, 1st Lord of the Isles	1476	1498	
Lord Bothwell (1485)	John Ramsay, 1st Lord Bothwell	1485	1488	New creation; Lost the title in 1488
Lord Ruthven (1488)	William Ruthven, 1st Lord Ruthven	1488	1528	New creation
Lord Crichton of Sanquhar (1488)	Robert Crichton, 1st Lord Crichton of Sanquhar	1488	1494	New creation
Lord Drummond of Cargill (1488)	John Drummond, 1st Lord Drummond	1488	1519	New creation
Lord Hay of Yester (1488)	John Hay, 1st Lord Hay of Yester	1488	1508	New creation
Lord Sempill (1489)	John Sempill, 1st Lord Sempill	1489	1513	New creation

== Peerage of Ireland ==
Title	Holder	Date gained	Date lost	Notes
Earl of Kildare (1316)	Gerald FitzGerald, 8th Earl of Kildare	1478	1513	
Earl of Ormond (1328)	Thomas Butler, 7th Earl of Ormond	1478	1515	
Earl of Desmond (1329)	James FitzGerald, 8th Earl of Desmond	1468	1487	Died
Earl of Desmond (1329)	Maurice FitzGerald, 9th Earl of Desmond	1487	1520	
Earl of Waterford (1446)	George Talbot, 4th Earl of Waterford	1473	1538	
Viscount Gormanston (1478)	Robert Preston, 1st Viscount Gormanston	1478	1503	
Baron Athenry (1172)	Thomas III de Bermingham	1473	1500	
Baron Kingsale (1223)	James de Courcy, 13th Baron Kingsale	1476	1499	
Baron Kerry (1223)	Edmond Fitzmaurice, 9th Baron Kerry	1469	1498	
Baron Barry (1261)	William Barry, 8th Baron Barry	1420	1480	Died
Baron Barry (1261)	John Barry, 9th Baron Barry	1480	1486	
Baron Barry (1261)	Thomas de Barry, 10th Baron Barry	1486	1488	
Baron Barry (1261)	William Barry, 11th Baron Barry	1488	1500	
Baron Slane (1370)	James Fleming, 7th Baron Slane	1470	1492	
Baron Howth (1425)	Robert St Lawrence, 3rd Baron Howth	1465	1485	Died
Baron Howth (1425)	Nicholas St Lawrence, 4th Baron Howth	1485	1526	
Baron Killeen (1449)	Edmond Plunkett, 4th Baron Killeen	1469	1510	
Baron Trimlestown (1461)	Christopher Barnewall, 2nd Baron Trimlestown	1470	1513	
Baron Dunsany (1462)	Richard Plunkett, 2nd Baron of Dunsany	1463	1480	Died
Baron Dunsany (1462)	John Plunkett, 3rd Baron of Dunsany	1480	1500	
Baron Portlester (1462)	Rowland FitzEustace, 1st Baron Portlester	1462	1496	
Baron Delvin (1486)	Richard Nugent, 1st Baron Delvin	1486	1537	New creation

Preceded by List of peers 1470–1479	Lists of peers by decade 1480–1489	Succeeded by List of peers 1490–1499
