= List of peers 1510–1519 =

This page lists all peers who held extant titles between 1510 and 1519.

== Peerage of England ==
Title	Holder	Date gained	Date lost	Notes
Duke of Cornwall (1337)	none	1509	1511	
Duke of Cornwall (1337)	Henry Tudor	1511	1511	Died, and the Dukedom lapsed to the Crown
Duke of Cornwall (1337)	none	1511	1514	
Duke of Cornwall (1337)	Henry Tudor	1514	1514	Died, and the Dukedom lapsed to the Crown
Duke of Cornwall (1337)	none	1514	1537	
Duke of Buckingham (1444)	Edward Stafford, 3rd Duke of Buckingham	1485	1521	
Duke of Norfolk (1483)	Thomas Howard, 2nd Duke of Norfolk	1514	1524	Restored
Duke of Suffolk (1514)	Charles Brandon, 1st Duke of Suffolk	1514	1545	Viscount Lisle in 1513
Marquess of Dorset (1475)	Thomas Grey, 2nd Marquess of Dorset	1501	1530	
Earl of Arundel (1138)	Thomas FitzAlan, 17th Earl of Arundel	1487	1524	
Earl of Oxford (1142)	John de Vere, 13th Earl of Oxford	1485	1513	Died
Earl of Oxford (1142)	John de Vere, 14th Earl of Oxford	1513	1526	
Earl of Salisbury (1337)	Margaret Pole, Countess of Salisbury	1513	1539	Restored
Earl of Westmorland (1397)	Ralph Neville, 4th Earl of Westmorland	1499	1549	
Earl of Northumberland (1416)	Henry Percy, 5th Earl of Northumberland	1489	1527	
Earl of Shrewsbury (1442)	George Talbot, 4th Earl of Shrewsbury	1473	1538	
Earl of Essex (1461)	Henry Bourchier, 2nd Earl of Essex	1483	1540	
Earl of Kent (1465)	Richard Grey, 3rd Earl of Kent	1505	1524	
Earl of Surrey (1483)	Thomas Howard, 1st Earl of Surrey	1483	1491	Restored as Duke of Norfolk, see above
Earl of Derby (1485)	Thomas Stanley, 2nd Earl of Derby	1504	1521	
Earl of Wiltshire (1510)	Henry Stafford, 1st Earl of Wiltshire	1510	1523	New creation
Earl of Devon (1511)	William Courtenay, 1st Earl of Devon	1511	1511	New creation; died
Earl of Devon (1511)	Henry Courtenay, 2nd Earl of Devon	1511	1538	
Earl of Worcester (1514)	Charles Somerset, 1st Earl of Worcester	1514	1526	New creation
Baron de Ros (1264)	George Manners, 11th Baron de Ros	1512	1513	Abeyance terminated in 1512; Died
Baron de Ros (1264)	Thomas Manners, 12th Baron de Ros	1513	1543	
Baron FitzWalter (1295)	Robert Radcliffe, 10th Baron FitzWalter	1506	1542	
Baron FitzWarine (1295)	John Bourchier, 11th Baron FitzWarin	1479	1539	
Baron Grey de Wilton (1295)	Edmund Grey, 9th Baron Grey de Wilton	1498	1511	Died
Baron Grey de Wilton (1295)	George Grey, 10th Baron Grey de Wilton	1511	1515	Died
Baron Grey de Wilton (1295)	Thomas Grey, 11th Baron Grey de Wilton	1515	1518	Died
Baron Grey de Wilton (1295)	Richard Grey, 12th Baron Grey de Wilton	1518	1520	
Baron Clinton (1299)	John Clinton, 7th Baron Clinton	1488	1514	Died
Baron Clinton (1299)	Thomas Clinton, 8th Baron Clinton	1514	1517	Died
Baron Clinton (1299)	Edward Clinton, 9th Baron Clinton	1517	1585	
Baron De La Warr (1299)	Thomas West, 8th Baron De La Warr	1476	1525	
Baron Ferrers of Chartley (1299)	Walter Devereux, 10th Baron Ferrers of Chartley	1501	1558	
Baron de Clifford (1299)	Henry Clifford, 10th Baron de Clifford	1485	1523	
Baron Morley (1299)	Alice Parker, 9th Baroness Morley	1489	1518	Died
Baron Morley (1299)	Henry Parker, 10th Baron Morley	1518	1556	
Baron Strange of Knockyn (1299)	Joan le Strange, 9th Baroness Strange	1470	1514	Died; Title succeeded by the Earl of Derby, and held by his heirs until 1594, when it fell into abeyance
Baron Zouche of Haryngworth (1308)	John la Zouche, 7th Baron Zouche	1468	1526	
Baron Audley of Heleigh (1313)	John Tuchet, 8th Baron Audley	1512	1557	Abeyance terminated in 1512
Baron Cobham of Kent (1313)	John Brooke, 7th Baron Cobham	1464	1512	Died
Baron Cobham of Kent (1313)	Thomas Brooke, 8th Baron Cobham	1512	1529	
Baron Willoughby de Eresby (1313)	William Willoughby, 11th Baron Willoughby de Eresby	1499	1526	
Baron Dacre (1321)	Thomas Fiennes, 8th Baron Dacre	1486	1534	
Baron FitzHugh (1321)	George FitzHugh, 7th Baron FitzHugh	1487	1513	Died, Barony fell into abeyance
Baron Greystock (1321)	Elizabeth Dacre, 6th Baroness Greystoke	1487	1516	Died
Baron Greystock (1321)	William Dacre, 7th Baron Greystoke	1516	1563	
Baron Harington (1326)	Cecily Bonville, 7th Baroness Harington	1460	1530	
Baron Scrope of Masham (1350)	Henry Scrope, 9th Baron Scrope of Masham	Aft. 1502	1512	Died
Baron Scrope of Masham (1350)	Ralph Scrope, 10th Baron Scrope of Masham	1512	1515	Died
Baron Scrope of Masham (1350)	Geoffrey Scrope, 11th Baron Scrope of Masham	1515	1517	Died, Barony fell into abeyance
Baron Botreaux (1368)	Mary Hungerford, 5th Baroness Botreaux	1477	1529	
Baron Scrope of Bolton (1371)	Henry Scrope, 7th Baron Scrope of Bolton	1506	1533	
Baron Lumley (1384)	Richard Lumley, 4th Baron Lumley	1508	1510	
Baron Lumley (1384)	John Lumley, 5th Baron Lumley	1510	1545	
Baron Bergavenny (1392)	George Nevill, 5th Baron Bergavenny	1492	1536	
Baron Berkeley (1421)	Maurice Berkeley, 4th Baron Berkeley	1506	1523	
Baron Latimer (1432)	Richard Neville, 2nd Baron Latimer	1469	1530	
Baron Dudley (1440)	Edward Sutton, 2nd Baron Dudley	1487	1532	
Baron Lisle (1444)	Elizabeth Grey, 5th Baroness Lisle	1504	1519	Died
Baron Lisle (1444)	Elizabeth Grey, 6th Baroness Lisle	1519	1525	
Baron Saye and Sele (1447)	Edward Fiennes, 5th Baron Saye and Sele	1501	1528	
Baron Stourton (1448)	William Stourton, 5th Baron Stourton	1487	1523	
Baron Berners (1455)	John Bourchier, 2nd Baron Berners	1474	1533	
Baron Hastings de Hastings (1461)	George Hastings, 3rd Baron Hastings	1506	1544	
Baron Herbert (1461)	Elizabeth Somerset, Baroness Herbert	1490	1514	Died
Baron Herbert (1461)	Henry Somerset, 4th Baron Herbert	1514	1548	
Baron Ogle (1461)	Ralph Ogle, 3rd Baron Ogle	1485	1513	Died
Baron Ogle (1461)	Robert Ogle, 4th Baron Ogle	1513	1530	
Baron Mountjoy (1465)	William Blount, 4th Baron Mountjoy	1485	1534	
Baron Dacre of Gilsland (1473)	Thomas Dacre, 2nd Baron Dacre	1485	1525	
Baron Grey of Powis (1482)	Edward Grey, 3rd Baron Grey of Powis	1504	1552	
Baron Daubeney (1486)	Henry Daubeney, 2nd Baron Daubeney	1507	1548	
Baron Willoughby de Broke (1491)	Robert Willoughby, 2nd Baron Willoughby de Broke	1502	1521	
Baron Ormond of Rochford (1495)	Thomas Butler, 1st Baron Ormond of Rochford	1495	1515	Died, Barony fell into abeyance
Baron Conyers (1509)	William Conyers, 1st Baron Conyers	1509	1524	
Baron Darcy de Darcy (1509)	Thomas Darcy, 1st Baron Darcy de Darcy	1509	1538	
Baron Montagu (1514)	Henry Pole, 1st Baron Montagu	1513	1539	New creation
Baron Monteagle (1514)	Edward Stanley, 1st Baron Monteagle	1514	1523	New creation

== Peerage of Scotland ==
Title	Holder	Date gained	Date lost	Notes
Duke of Rothesay (1398)	James Stewart, Duke of Rothesay	1512	1513	
Duke of Albany (1456)	John Stewart, Duke of Albany	1515	1536	Restored
Duke of Ross (1514)	Alexander Stewart, Duke of Ross	1514	1515	New creation; died, title extinct
Earl of Sutherland (1235)	John de Moravia, 9th Earl of Sutherland	1508	1514	Died
Earl of Sutherland (1235)	Elizabeth de Moravia, 10th Countess of Sutherland	1514	1535	
Earl of Angus (1389)	Archibald Douglas, 5th Earl of Angus	1463	1513	Died
Earl of Angus (1389)	Archibald Douglas, 6th Earl of Angus	1513	1557	
Earl of Crawford (1398)	John Lindsay, 6th Earl of Crawford	1495	1513	Died
Earl of Crawford (1398)	Alexander Lindsay, 7th Earl of Crawford	1513	1517	Died
Earl of Crawford (1398)	David Lindsay, 8th Earl of Crawford	1517	1542	
Earl of Menteith (1427)	Alexander Graham, 2nd Earl of Menteith	1490	1537	
Earl of Huntly (1445)	Alexander Gordon, 3rd Earl of Huntly	1501	1524	
Earl of Erroll (1452)	William Hay, 4th Earl of Erroll	1507	1513	Died
Earl of Erroll (1452)	William Hay, 5th Earl of Erroll	1513	1541	
Earl of Caithness (1455)	William Sinclair, 2nd Earl of Caithness	1476	1513	Died
Earl of Caithness (1455)	John Sinclair, 3rd Earl of Caithness	1513	1529	
Earl of Argyll (1457)	Archibald Campbell, 2nd Earl of Argyll	1493	1513	Died
Earl of Argyll (1457)	Colin Campbell, 3rd Earl of Argyll	1513	1529	
Earl of Atholl (1457)	John Stewart, 1st Earl of Atholl	1457	1512	Died
Earl of Atholl (1457)	John Stewart, 2nd Earl of Atholl	1512	1521	
Earl of Morton (1458)	John Douglas, 2nd Earl of Morton	1493	1513	Died
Earl of Morton (1458)	James Douglas, 3rd Earl of Morton	1513	1548	
Earl of Rothes (1458)	George Leslie, 2nd Earl of Rothes	1490	1513	Died
Earl of Rothes (1458)	William Leslie, 3rd Earl of Rothes	1513	1513	Died
Earl of Rothes (1458)	George Leslie, 4th Earl of Rothes	1513	1558	
Earl Marischal (1458)	William Keith, 3rd Earl Marischal	1483	1530	
Earl of Buchan (1469)	John Stewart, 3rd Earl of Buchan	1505	1551	
Earl of Glencairn (1488)	Cuthbert Cunningham, 3rd Earl of Glencairn	1490	1541	
Earl of Bothwell (1488)	Adam Hepburn, 2nd Earl of Bothwell	1508	1513	
Earl of Bothwell (1488)	Patrick Hepburn, 3rd Earl of Bothwell	1513	1556	
Earl of Lennox (1488)	Matthew Stewart, 2nd Earl of Lennox	1495	1513	Died
Earl of Lennox (1488)	John Stewart, 3rd Earl of Lennox	1513	1526	
Earl of Moray (1501)	James Stewart, 1st Earl of Moray	1501	1544	
Earl of Arran (1503)	James Hamilton, 1st Earl of Arran	1503	1529	
Earl of Montrose (1503)	William Graham, 1st Earl of Montrose	1503	1513	Died
Earl of Montrose (1503)	William Graham, 2nd Earl of Montrose	1513	1571	
Earl of Eglinton (1507)	Hugh Montgomerie, 1st Earl of Eglinton	1507	1545	
Earl of Cassilis (1509)	David Kennedy, 1st Earl of Cassilis	1509	1513	Died
Earl of Cassilis (1509)	Gilbert Kennedy, 2nd Earl of Cassilis	1513	1527	
Lord Erskine (1429)	Robert Erskine, 4th Lord Erskine	1509	1513	de jure Earl of Mar; died
Lord Erskine (1429)	John Erskine, 5th Lord Erskine	1513	1552	de jure Earl of Mar
Lord Somerville (1430)	John Somerville, 4th Lord Somerville	1491	1523	
Lord Haliburton of Dirleton (1441)	Janet Haliburton, 7th Lady Haliburton of Dirleton	1502	1560	
Lord Forbes (1442)	John Forbes, 6th Lord Forbes	1493	1547	
Lord Maxwell (1445)	John Maxwell, 4th Lord Maxwell	1485	1513	Died
Lord Maxwell (1445)	Robert Maxwell, 5th Lord Maxwell	1513	1546	
Lord Glamis (1445)	John Lyon, 6th Lord Glamis	1505	1528	
Lord Lindsay of the Byres (1445)	Patrick Lindsay, 4th Lord Lindsay	1497	1526	
Lord Saltoun (1445)	Alexander Abernethy, 4th Lord Saltoun	1505	1527	
Lord Gray (1445)	Andrew Gray, 2nd Lord Gray	1469	1514	Died
Lord Gray (1445)	Patrick Gray, 3rd Lord Grayy	1514	1541	
Lord Sinclair (1449)	Henry Sinclair, 3rd Lord Sinclair	1487	1513	Died
Lord Sinclair (1449)	William Sinclair, 4th Lord Sinclair	1513	1570	
Lord Fleming (1451)	John Fleming, 2nd Lord Fleming	1494	1524	
Lord Seton (1451)	George Seton, 3rd Lord Seton	1508	1513	Died
Lord Seton (1451)	George Seton, 6th Lord Seton	1513	1549	
Lord Borthwick (1452)	William Borthwick, 3rd Lord Borthwick	1484	1513	Died
Lord Borthwick (1452)	William Borthwick, 4th Lord Borthwick	1513	1542	
Lord Boyd (1454)	Robert Boyd, 4th Lord Boyd	Aft. 1508	1558	
Lord Oliphant (1455)	John Oliphant, 2nd Lord Oliphant	1498	1516	Died
Lord Oliphant (1455)	Laurence Oliphant, 3rd Lord Oliphant	1516	1566	
Lord Livingston (1458)	William Livingston, 4th Lord Livingston	1503	1518	Died
Lord Livingston (1458)	Alexander Livingston, 5th Lord Livingston	1518	1553	
Lord Cathcart (1460)	John Cathcart, 2nd Lord Cathcart	1497	1535	
Lord Lovat (1464)	Thomas Fraser, 2nd Lord Lovat	1500	1524	
Lord Innermeath (1470)	Thomas Stewart, 2nd Lord Innermeath	1489	1513	Died
Lord Innermeath (1470)	Richard Stewart, 3rd Lord Innermeath	1513	1532	
Lord Carlyle of Torthorwald (1473)	William Carlyle, 2nd Lord Carlyle	1501	1524	
Lord Home (1473)	Alexander Home, 3rd Lord Home	1506	1516	
Lord Home (1473)	George Home, 4th Lord Home	1516	1549	
Lord Ruthven (1488)	William Ruthven, 1st Lord Ruthven	1488	1528	
Lord Crichton of Sanquhar (1488)	Robert Crichton, 2nd Lord Crichton of Sanquhar	1494	1513	Died
Lord Crichton of Sanquhar (1488)	Robert Crichton, 3rd Lord Crichton of Sanquhar	1513	1516-20	Died
Lord Crichton of Sanquhar (1488)	Robert Crichton, 4th Lord Crichton of Sanquhar	1516-20	1536	
Lord Drummond of Cargill (1488)	John Drummond, 1st Lord Drummond	1488	1519	Died
Lord Drummond of Cargill (1488)	David Drummond, 2nd Lord Drummond	1519	1571	
Lord Hay of Yester (1488)	John Hay, 2nd Lord Hay of Yester	1508	1513	Died
Lord Hay of Yester (1488)	John Hay, 3rd Lord Hay of Yester	1513	1543	
Lord Sempill (1489)	John Sempill, 1st Lord Sempill	1489	1513	Died
Lord Sempill (1489)	William Sempill, 2nd Lord Sempill	1513	1552	
Lord Herries of Terregles (1490)	Andrew Herries, 2nd Lord Herries of Terregles	1505	1513	Died
Lord Herries of Terregles (1490)	William Herries, 3rd Lord Herries of Terregles	1513	1543	
Lord Ogilvy of Airlie (1491)	James Ogilvy, 3rd Lord Ogilvy of Airlie	1506	1524	
Lord Ross (1499)	John Ross, 2nd Lord Ross	1501	1513	Died
Lord Ross (1499)	Ninian Ross, 3rd Lord Ross	1513	1556	
Lord Avondale (1500)	Andrew Stewart, 1st Lord Avondale	1500	1513	Died
Lord Avondale (1500)	Andrew Stewart, 2nd Lord Avondale	1513	1549	
Lord Elphinstone (1509)	Alexander Elphinstone, 1st Lord Elphinstone	1509	1513	Died
Lord Elphinstone (1509)	Alexander Elphinstone, 2nd Lord Elphinstone	1513	1547	

== Peerage of Ireland ==
Title	Holder	Date gained	Date lost	Notes
Earl of Kildare (1316)	Gerald FitzGerald, 8th Earl of Kildare	1478	1513	Died
Earl of Kildare (1316)	Gerald FitzGerald, 9th Earl of Kildare	1513	1534	
Earl of Ormond (1328)	Thomas Butler, 7th Earl of Ormond	1478	1515	Died
Earl of Ormond (1328)	Piers Butler, 8th Earl of Ormond	1515	1539	
Earl of Desmond (1329)	Maurice FitzGerald, 9th Earl of Desmond	1487	1520	
Earl of Waterford (1446)	George Talbot, 4th Earl of Waterford	1473	1538	
Viscount Gormanston (1478)	William Preston, 2nd Viscount Gormanston	1503	1532	
Baron Athenry (1172)	Meiler de Bermingham	1500	1529	
Baron Kingsale (1223)	David de Courcy, 15th Baron Kingsale	1505	1520	
Baron Kerry (1223)	Edmond Fitzmaurice, 10th Baron Kerry	1498	1543	
Baron Barry (1261)	John Barry, 12th Baron Barry	1500	1530	
Baron Slane (1370)	Christopher Fleming, 8th Baron Slane	1492	1517	Died
Baron Slane (1370)	James Fleming, 9th Baron Slane	1517	1578	
Baron Howth (1425)	Nicholas St Lawrence, 4th Baron Howth	1485	1526	
Baron Killeen (1449)	Edmond Plunkett, 4th Baron Killeen	1469	1510	Died
Baron Killeen (1449)	John Plunkett, 5th Baron Killeen	1510	1550	
Baron Trimlestown (1461)	Christopher Barnewall, 2nd Baron Trimlestown	1470	1513	Died
Baron Trimlestown (1461)	John Barnewall, 3rd Baron Trimlestown	1513	1538	
Baron Dunsany (1462)	Edward Plunkett, 4th Baron of Dunsany	1500	1521	
Baron Delvin (1486)	Richard Nugent, 1st Baron Delvin	1486	1537	

Preceded by List of peers 1500–1509	Lists of peers by decade 1510–1519	Succeeded by List of peers 1520–1529
