= List of peers 1500–1509 =

This page lists all peers who held extant titles between 1500 and 1509.

== Peerage of England ==
Title	Holder	Date gained	Date lost	Notes
Duke of Cornwall (1337)	Arthur Tudor	1486	1502	Died, and his peerage dignities lapsed to the Crown
Duke of Cornwall (1337)	Henry Tudor	1502	1509	Ascended the Throne, when all his honours merged in the Crown
Duke of Cornwall (1337)	none	1509	1511	
Duke of Buckingham (1444)	Edward Stafford, 3rd Duke of Buckingham	1485	1521	
Duke of Norfolk (1483)	none	1485	1514	Attainted
Duke of York (1494)	Henry Tudor	1494	1504	Creation became void, by Act of Parliament; Duke of Cornwall since 1502, see above
Marquess of Dorset (1475)	Thomas Grey, 1st Marquess of Dorset	1475	1501	Died
Marquess of Dorset (1475)	Thomas Grey, 2nd Marquess of Dorset	1501	1530	
Earl of Arundel (1138)	Thomas FitzAlan, 17th Earl of Arundel	1487	1524	
Earl of Oxford (1142)	John de Vere, 13th Earl of Oxford	1485	1513	
Earl of Westmorland (1397)	Ralph Neville, 4th Earl of Westmorland	1499	1549	
Earl of Northumberland (1416)	Henry Percy, 5th Earl of Northumberland	1489	1527	
Earl of Shrewsbury (1442)	George Talbot, 4th Earl of Shrewsbury	1473	1538	
Earl of Essex (1461)	Henry Bourchier, 2nd Earl of Essex	1483	1540	
Earl of Kent (1465)	George Grey, 2nd Earl of Kent	1490	1505	Died
Earl of Kent (1465)	Richard Grey, 3rd Earl of Kent	1505	1524	
Earl of Surrey (1483)	Thomas Howard, 1st Earl of Surrey	1483	1491	
Earl of Devon (1485)	Edward Courtenay, 1st Earl of Devon	1485	1509	Died, peerage forfeited as his son and heir was attainted
Earl of Derby (1485)	Thomas Stanley, 1st Earl of Derby	1485	1504	Died
Earl of Derby (1485)	Thomas Stanley, 2nd Earl of Derby	1504	1521	
Viscount Beaumont (1440)	William Beaumont, 2nd Viscount Beaumont	1460	1507	Died, title extinct
Viscount Lisle (1483)	John Grey, 2nd Viscount Lisle	1492	1504	Died, title extinct
Baron de Ros (1264)	Edmund de Ros, 10th Baron de Ros	1464	1508	Died, Barony fell into abeyance
Baron Dynham (1295)	John Dynham, 8th or 1st Baron Dynham	1467	1501	Died, Barony fell into abeyance
Baron FitzWalter (1295)	Robert Radcliffe, 10th Baron FitzWalter	1506	1542	Attainter reversed
Baron FitzWarine (1295)	John Bourchier, 11th Baron FitzWarin	1479	1539	
Baron Grey de Wilton (1295)	Edmund Grey, 9th Baron Grey de Wilton	1498	1511	
Baron Clinton (1299)	John Clinton, 7th Baron Clinton	1488	1514	
Baron De La Warr (1299)	Thomas West, 8th Baron De La Warr	1476	1525	
Baron Ferrers of Chartley (1299)	John Devereux, 9th Baron Ferrers of Chartley	1468	1501	Died
Baron Ferrers of Chartley (1299)	Walter Devereux, 10th Baron Ferrers of Chartley	1501	1558	
Baron de Clifford (1299)	Henry Clifford, 10th Baron de Clifford	1485	1523	
Baron Morley (1299)	Alice Parker, 9th Baroness Morley	1489	1518	
Baron Strange of Knockyn (1299)	Joan le Strange, 9th Baroness Strange	1470	1514	
Baron Zouche of Haryngworth (1308)	John la Zouche, 7th Baron Zouche	1468	1526	
Baron Cobham of Kent (1313)	John Brooke, 7th Baron Cobham	1464	1512	
Baron Willoughby de Eresby (1313)	William Willoughby, 11th Baron Willoughby de Eresby	1499	1526	
Baron Dacre (1321)	Thomas Fiennes, 8th Baron Dacre	1486	1534	
Baron FitzHugh (1321)	George FitzHugh, 7th Baron FitzHugh	1487	1513	
Baron Greystock (1321)	Elizabeth Dacre, 6th Baroness Greystoke	1487	1516	
Baron Harington (1326)	Cecily Bonville, 7th Baroness Harington	1460	1530	
Baron Scrope of Masham (1350)	Alice Scrope, 7th Baroness Scrope of Masham	1493	1502	Died
Baron Scrope of Masham (1350)	Elizabeth Scrope, 8th Baroness Scrope of Masham	1502	Aft. 1502	Died
Baron Scrope of Masham (1350)	Henry Scrope, 9th Baron Scrope of Masham	Aft. 1502	1512	
Baron Botreaux (1368)	Mary Hungerford, 5th Baroness Botreaux	1477	1529	
Baron Scrope of Bolton (1371)	Henry Scrope, 6th Baron Scrope of Bolton	1498	1506	Died
Baron Scrope of Bolton (1371)	Henry Scrope, 7th Baron Scrope of Bolton	1506	1533	
Baron Lumley (1384)	George Lumley, 3rd Baron Lumley	1480	1508	Died
Baron Lumley (1384)	Richard Lumley, 4th Baron Lumley	1508	1510	
Baron Bergavenny (1392)	George Nevill, 5th Baron Bergavenny	1492	1536	
Baron Berkeley (1421)	Maurice Berkeley, 3rd Baron Berkeley	1492	1506	Died
Baron Berkeley (1421)	Maurice Berkeley, 4th Baron Berkeley	1506	1523	
Baron Latimer (1432)	Richard Neville, 2nd Baron Latimer	1469	1530	
Baron Dudley (1440)	Edward Sutton, 2nd Baron Dudley	1487	1532	
Baron Lisle (1444)	John Grey, 4th Baron Lisle	1487	1504	Died
Baron Lisle (1444)	Elizabeth Grey, 5th Baroness Lisle	1504	1519	
Baron Saye and Sele (1447)	Richard Fiennes, 4th Baron Saye and Sele	1476	1501	Died
Baron Saye and Sele (1447)	Edward Fiennes, 5th Baron Saye and Sele	1501	1528	
Baron Beauchamp of Powick (1447)	Richard Beauchamp, 2nd Baron Beauchamp	1475	1503	Died, title extinct
Baron Stourton (1448)	William Stourton, 5th Baron Stourton	1487	1523	
Baron Berners (1455)	John Bourchier, 2nd Baron Berners	1474	1533	
Baron Hastings de Hastings (1461)	Edward Hastings, 2nd Baron Hastings	1483	1506	Died
Baron Hastings de Hastings (1461)	George Hastings, 3rd Baron Hastings	1506	1544	
Baron Herbert (1461)	Elizabeth Somerset, Baroness Herbert	1490	1514	
Baron Ogle (1461)	Ralph Ogle, 3rd Baron Ogle	1485	1513	
Baron Mountjoy (1465)	William Blount, 4th Baron Mountjoy	1485	1534	
Baron Dacre of Gilsland (1473)	Thomas Dacre, 2nd Baron Dacre	1485	1525	
Baron Grey of Powis (1482)	John Grey, 2nd Baron Grey of Powis	1497	1504	Died
Baron Grey of Powis (1482)	Edward Grey, 3rd Baron Grey of Powis	1504	1552	
Baron Daubeney (1486)	Giles Daubeney, 1st Baron Daubeney	1486	1507	Died
Baron Daubeney (1486)	Henry Daubeney, 2nd Baron Daubeney	1507	1548	
Baron Willoughby de Broke (1491)	Robert Willoughby, 1st Baron Willoughby de Broke	1492	1502	Died
Baron Willoughby de Broke (1491)	Robert Willoughby, 2nd Baron Willoughby de Broke	1502	1521	
Baron Ormond of Rochford (1495)	Thomas Butler, 1st Baron Ormond of Rochford	1495	1515	
Baron Conyers (1509)	William Conyers, 1st Baron Conyers	1509	1524	New creation
Baron Darcy de Darcy (1509)	Thomas Darcy, 1st Baron Darcy de Darcy	1509	1538	New creation

== Peerage of Scotland ==
Title	Holder	Date gained	Date lost	Notes
Duke of Rothesay (1398)	James, Duke of Rothesay	1507	1508	Died
Duke of Rothesay (1398)	Arthur Stewart, Duke of Rothesay	1509	1510	
Duke of Ross (1488)	James Stewart, Duke of Ross	1488	1504	Died, title extinct
Earl of Sutherland (1235)	John de Moravia, 8th Earl of Sutherland	1460	1508	Died
Earl of Sutherland (1235)	John de Moravia, 9th Earl of Sutherland	1508	1514	
Earl of Angus (1389)	Archibald Douglas, 5th Earl of Angus	1463	1513	
Earl of Crawford (1398)	John Lindsay, 6th Earl of Crawford	1495	1513	
Earl of Menteith (1427)	Alexander Graham, 2nd Earl of Menteith	1490	1537	
Earl of Huntly (1445)	George Gordon, 2nd Earl of Huntly	1470	1501	Died
Earl of Huntly (1445)	Alexander Gordon, 3rd Earl of Huntly	1501	1524	
Earl of Erroll (1452)	William Hay, 3rd Earl of Erroll	1470	1507	Died
Earl of Erroll (1452)	William Hay, 4th Earl of Erroll	1507	1513	
Earl of Caithness (1455)	William Sinclair, 2nd Earl of Caithness	1476	1513	
Earl of Argyll (1457)	Archibald Campbell, 2nd Earl of Argyll	1493	1513	
Earl of Atholl (1457)	John Stewart, 1st Earl of Atholl	1457	1512	
Earl of Morton (1458)	John Douglas, 2nd Earl of Morton	1493	1513	
Earl of Rothes (1458)	George Leslie, 2nd Earl of Rothes	1490	1513	
Earl Marischal (1458)	William Keith, 3rd Earl Marischal	1483	1530	
Earl of Buchan (1469)	Alexander Stewart, 2nd Earl of Buchan	1469	1505	Died
Earl of Buchan (1469)	John Stewart, 3rd Earl of Buchan	1505	1551	
Earl of Mar and Garioch (1486)	John Stewart, Earl of Mar and Garioch	1485	1503	Died, title extinct
Earl of Glencairn (1488)	Cuthbert Cunningham, 3rd Earl of Glencairn	1490	1541	
Earl of Bothwell (1488)	Patrick Hepburn, 1st Earl of Bothwell	1488	1508	Died
Earl of Bothwell (1488)	Adam Hepburn, 2nd Earl of Bothwell	1508	1513	
Earl of Lennox (1488)	Matthew Stewart, 2nd Earl of Lennox	1495	1513	
Earl of Moray (1501)	James Stewart, 1st Earl of Moray	1501	1544	New creation
Earl of Arran (1503)	James Hamilton, 1st Earl of Arran	1503	1529	New creation
Earl of Montrose (1503)	William Graham, 1st Earl of Montrose	1503	1513	New creation
Earl of Eglinton (1507)	Hugh Montgomerie, 1st Earl of Eglinton	1507	1545	New creation
Earl of Cassilis (1509)	David Kennedy, 1st Earl of Cassilis	1509	1513	New creation
Lord Erskine (1429)	Alexander Erskine, 3rd Lord Erskine	1494	1509	de jure Earl of Mar; died
Lord Erskine (1429)	Robert Erskine, 4th Lord Erskine	1509	1513	de jure Earl of Mar
Lord Somerville (1430)	John Somerville, 4th Lord Somerville	1491	1523	
Lord Haliburton of Dirleton (1441)	James Haliburton, 5th Lord Haliburton of Dirleton	1492	1502	Died
Lord Haliburton of Dirleton (1441)	Patrick Haliburton, 6th Lord Haliburton of Dirleton	1502	1506	
Lord Haliburton of Dirleton (1441)	Janet Haliburton, 7th Lady Haliburton of Dirleton	1502	1560	
Lord Forbes (1442)	John Forbes, 6th Lord Forbes	1493	1547	
Lord Hamilton (1445)	James Hamilton, 2nd Lord Hamilton	1479	1529	Created Earl of Arran, see above
Lord Maxwell (1445)	John Maxwell, 3rd Lord Maxwell	1485	1513	
Lord Glamis (1445)	John Lyon, 4th Lord Glamis	1497	1500	Died
Lord Glamis (1445)	George Lyon, 5th Lord Glamis	1500	1505	Died
Lord Glamis (1445)	John Lyon, 6th Lord Glamis	1505	1528	
Lord Graham (1445)	William Graham, 3rd Lord Graham	1472	1513	Created Earl of Montrose, see above
Lord Lindsay of the Byres (1445)	Patrick Lindsay, 4th Lord Lindsay	1497	1526	
Lord Saltoun (1445)	James Abernethy, 3rd Lord Saltoun	1488	1505	Died
Lord Saltoun (1445)	Alexander Abernethy, 4th Lord Saltoun	1505	1527	
Lord Gray (1445)	Andrew Gray, 2nd Lord Gray	1469	1514	
Lord Montgomerie (1449)	Hugh Montgomerie, 2nd Lord Montgomerie	1470	1545	Created Earl of Eglinton, see above
Lord Sinclair (1449)	Henry Sinclair, 3rd Lord Sinclair	1487	1513	
Lord Fleming (1451)	John Fleming, 2nd Lord Fleming	1494	1524	
Lord Seton (1451)	George Seton, 2nd Lord Seton	1478	1508	Died
Lord Seton (1451)	George Seton, 3rd Lord Seton	1508	1513	
Lord Borthwick (1452)	William Borthwick, 3rd Lord Borthwick	1484	1513	
Lord Boyd (1454)	Alexander Boyd, 3rd Lord Boyd	1482	Aft. 1508	Died
Lord Boyd (1454)	Robert Boyd, 4th Lord Boyd	Aft. 1508	1558	
Lord Oliphant (1455)	John Oliphant, 2nd Lord Oliphant	1498	1516	
Lord Kennedy (1457)	John Kennedy, 2nd Lord Kennedy	1489	1509	Died
Lord Kennedy (1457)	David Kennedy, 3rd Lord Kennedy	1509	1513	Created Earl of Cassilis, see above
Lord Livingston (1458)	James Livingston, 3rd Lord Livingston	1497	1503	Died
Lord Livingston (1458)	William Livingston, 4th Lord Livingston	1503	1518	
Lord Cathcart (1460)	John Cathcart, 2nd Lord Cathcart	1497	1535	
Lord Lovat (1464)	Hugh Fraser, 1st Lord Lovat	1464	1500	Died
Lord Lovat (1464)	Thomas Fraser, 2nd Lord Lovat	1500	1524	
Lord Innermeath (1470)	Thomas Stewart, 2nd Lord Innermeath	1489	1513	
Lord Carlyle of Torthorwald (1473)	John Carlyle, 1st Lord Carlyle	1473	1501	Died
Lord Carlyle of Torthorwald (1473)	William Carlyle, 2nd Lord Carlyle	1501	1524	
Lord Home (1473)	Alexander Home, 2nd Lord Home	1490	1506	Died
Lord Home (1473)	Alexander Home, 3rd Lord Home	1506	1516	
Lord Ruthven (1488)	William Ruthven, 1st Lord Ruthven	1488	1528	
Lord Crichton of Sanquhar (1488)	Robert Crichton, 2nd Lord Crichton of Sanquhar	1494	1513	
Lord Drummond of Cargill (1488)	John Drummond, 1st Lord Drummond	1488	1519	
Lord Hay of Yester (1488)	John Hay, 1st Lord Hay of Yester	1488	1508	Died
Lord Hay of Yester (1488)	John Hay, 2nd Lord Hay of Yester	1508	1513	
Lord Sempill (1489)	John Sempill, 1st Lord Sempill	1489	1513	
Lord Herries of Terregles (1490)	Herbert Herries, 1st Lord Herries of Terregles	1490	1505	Died
Lord Herries of Terregles (1490)	Andrew Herries, 2nd Lord Herries of Terregles	1505	1513	
Lord Ogilvy of Airlie (1491)	James Ogilvy, 1st Lord Ogilvy of Airlie	1491	1504	Died
Lord Ogilvy of Airlie (1491)	John Ogilvy, 2nd Lord Ogilvy of Airlie	1504	1506	Died
Lord Ogilvy of Airlie (1491)	James Ogilvy, 3rd Lord Ogilvy of Airlie	1506	1524	
Lord Ross (1499)	John Ross, 1st Lord Ross	1499	1501	Died
Lord Ross (1499)	John Ross, 2nd Lord Ross	1501	1513	
Lord Avondale (1500)	Andrew Stewart, 1st Lord Avondale	1500	1513	New creation
Lord Elphinstone (1509)	Alexander Elphinstone, 1st Lord Elphinstone	1509	1513	New creation

== Peerage of Ireland ==
Title	Holder	Date gained	Date lost	Notes
Earl of Kildare (1316)	Gerald FitzGerald, 8th Earl of Kildare	1478	1513	
Earl of Ormond (1328)	Thomas Butler, 7th Earl of Ormond	1478	1515	
Earl of Desmond (1329)	Maurice FitzGerald, 9th Earl of Desmond	1487	1520	
Earl of Waterford (1446)	George Talbot, 4th Earl of Waterford	1473	1538	
Viscount Gormanston (1478)	Robert Preston, 1st Viscount Gormanston	1478	1503	Died
Viscount Gormanston (1478)	William Preston, 2nd Viscount Gormanston	1503	1532	
Baron Athenry (1172)	Thomas III de Bermingham	1473	1500	Died
Baron Athenry (1172)	Meiler de Bermingham	1500	1529	
Baron Kingsale (1223)	Edmond de Courcy, 14th Baron Kingsale	1499	1505	Died
Baron Kingsale (1223)	David de Courcy, 15th Baron Kingsale	1505	1520	
Baron Kerry (1223)	Edmond Fitzmaurice, 10th Baron Kerry	1498	1543	
Baron Barry (1261)	William Barry, 11th Baron Barry	1488	1500	Died
Baron Barry (1261)	John Barry, 12th Baron Barry	1500	1530	
Baron Slane (1370)	Christopher Fleming, 8th Baron Slane	1492	1517	
Baron Howth (1425)	Nicholas St Lawrence, 4th Baron Howth	1485	1526	
Baron Killeen (1449)	Edmond Plunkett, 4th Baron Killeen	1469	1510	
Baron Trimlestown (1461)	Christopher Barnewall, 2nd Baron Trimlestown	1470	1513	
Baron Dunsany (1462)	John Plunkett, 3rd Baron of Dunsany	1480	1500	Died
Baron Dunsany (1462)	Edward Plunkett, 4th Baron of Dunsany	1500	1521	
Baron Delvin (1486)	Richard Nugent, 1st Baron Delvin	1486	1537	

Preceded by List of peers 1490–1499	Lists of peers by decade 1500–1509	Succeeded by List of peers 1510–1519
