= List of peers 1470–1479 =

This page lists all peers who held extant titles between 1470 and 1479.

== Peerage of England ==
Title	Holder	Date gained	Date lost	Notes
Duke of Cornwall (1337)	Edward of Westminster	1453	1471	Died, when his peerage dignities lapsed to the Crown
Duke of Cornwall (1337)	Edward Plantagenet	1470/1471	1483	Created Earl of March, and of Pembroke in 1479
Duke of Norfolk (1397)	John de Mowbray, 4th Duke of Norfolk	1461	1476	Died, title became extinct; Earldom of Norfolk succeeded by a daughter, see below
Duke of Buckingham (1444)	Henry Stafford, 2nd Duke of Buckingham	1460	1483	
Duke of Somerset (1448)	Edmund Beaufort, 3rd Duke of Somerset	1464	1471	Died, title became extinct
Duke of Suffolk (1448)	John de la Pole, 2nd Duke of Suffolk	1450	1491	
Duke of Clarence (1461)	George Plantagenet, 1st Duke of Clarence	1461	1478	Created Earl of Salisbury, and of Warwick in 1472; attained, and all his honours became forfeited
Duke of Gloucester (1461)	Richard Plantagenet, 1st Duke of Gloucester	1461	1483	
Duke of Bedford (1470)	George Neville, 1st Duke of Bedford	1470	1478	New creation; degraded from his peerage
Duke of York (1474)	Richard of Shrewsbury, 1st Duke of York	1474	1483	New creation; 1st Duke of Norfolk (1477), 1st Earl of Nottingham (1476), 1st Earl Warenne (1477)
Marquess of Montagu (1470)	John Neville, 1st Marquess of Montagu	1470	1471	New creation; attainted and his honours became forfeited
Marquess of Dorset (1475)	Thomas Grey, 1st Marquess of Dorset	1475	1501	New creation
Earl of Warwick (1088)	Anne Neville, 16th Countess of Warwick and Richard Neville, 16th Earl of Warwick	1448; 1449	1492; 1471	
Earl of Arundel (1138)	William FitzAlan, 16th Earl of Arundel	1438	1487	
Earl of Oxford (1142)	John de Vere, 13th Earl of Oxford	1462	1474	Attainted
Earl of Norfolk (1312)	Anne de Mowbray, 8th Countess of Norfolk	1476	1481	
Earl of Devon (1335)	John Courtenay, 7th Earl of Devon	1470	1471	Restored; died, titles fell in abeyance
Earl of Salisbury (1337)	Richard Neville, 6th Earl of Salisbury	1462	1471	Died, titles fell in abeyance
Earl of Westmorland (1397)	Ralph Neville, 2nd Earl of Westmorland	1425	1484	
Earl of Northumberland (1416)	Henry Percy, 4th Earl of Northumberland	1470	1489	Restored
Earl of Shrewsbury (1442)	John Talbot, 3rd Earl of Shrewsbury	1460	1473	Died
Earl of Shrewsbury (1442)	George Talbot, 4th Earl of Shrewsbury	1473	1538	
Earl of Worcester (1449)	John Tiptoft, 1st Earl of Worcester	1449	1470	Attainted
Earl of Worcester (1449)	Edward Tiptoft, 2nd Earl of Worcester	1471	1485	Restored
Earl of Richmond (1452)	Henry Tudor, Earl of Richmond	1456	1485	
Earl of Essex (1461)	Henry Bourchier, 1st Earl of Essex	1461	1483	
Earl of Kent (1465)	Edmund Grey, 1st Earl of Kent	1465	1490	
Earl Rivers (1465)	Anthony Woodville, 2nd Earl Rivers	1469	1483	
Earl of Lincoln (1467)	John de la Pole, 1st Earl of Lincoln	1467	1487	
Earl of Pembroke (1469)	William Herbert, 2nd Earl of Pembroke	1469	1479	Surrendered peerage
Earl of Wiltshire (1470)	John Stafford, 1st Earl of Wiltshire	1470	1473	New creation; died
Earl of Wiltshire (1470)	Edward Stafford, 2nd Earl of Wiltshire	1473	1499	
Earl of Huntingdon (1471)	Thomas Grey, 1st Earl of Huntingdon	1471	1475	New creation; resigned, and was created Marquess of Dorset
Earl of Winchester (1472)	Lewis de Bruges, 1st Earl of Winchester	1472	1492	New creation
Earl of Salisbury (1478)	Edward Plantagenet, Earl of Salisbury	1476	1484	New creation
Earl of Huntingdon (1479)	William Herbert, 1st Earl of Huntingdon	1479	1491	New creation
Viscount Beaumont (1440)	William Beaumont, 2nd Viscount Beaumont	1460	1507	Attainted 1471-1485
Viscount Lisle (1451)	Thomas Talbot, 2nd Viscount Lisle	1453	1470	Died, title extinct
Baron de Ros (1264)	Edmund de Ros, 10th Baron de Ros	1464	1508	Under attainder until 1485
Baron Dynham (1295)	John Dynham, 8th or 1st Baron Dynham	1467	1501	
Baron Fauconberg (1295)	Joan Neville, 6th Baroness Fauconberg	1429	1490	
Baron FitzWalter (1295)	Elizabeth Radcliffe, suo jure Baroness FitzWalter	1431	1485	
Baron FitzWarine (1295)	Thomazine FitzWarine, suo jure Baroness FitzWarine	1433	1471	Died
Baron FitzWarine (1295)	Fulk Bourchier, 10th Baron FitzWarin	1471	1479	Died
Baron FitzWarine (1295)	John Bourchier, 11th Baron FitzWarin	1479	1539	
Baron Grey de Wilton (1295)	Reginald Grey, 7th Baron Grey de Wilton	1442	1493	
Baron Clinton (1299)	John Clinton, 6th Baron Clinton	1464	1488	
Baron De La Warr (1299)	Richard West, 7th Baron De La Warr	1450	1476	Died
Baron De La Warr (1299)	Thomas West, 8th Baron De La Warr	1476	1525	
Baron Ferrers of Chartley (1299)	John Devereux, 9th Baron Ferrers of Chartley	1468	1501	
Baron Lovel (1299)	Francis Lovel, 9th Baron Lovel	1465	1485	
Baron Scales (1299)	Elizabeth de Scales Woodville, Baroness Scales	1460	1473	Died, Barony fell into abeyance
Baron Ferrers of Groby (1299)	Elizabeth Ferrers, 6th Baroness Ferrers of Groby	1445	1483	
Baron Morley (1299)	Alianore Lovel, 7th Baroness Morley	1442	1476	Died
Baron Morley (1299)	Henry Lovel, 8th Baron Morley	1476	1489	
Baron Strange of Knockyn (1299)	John le Strange, 8th Baron Strange	1449	1470	Died
Baron Strange of Knockyn (1299)	Joan le Strange, 9th Baroness Strange	1470	1514	
Baron Zouche of Haryngworth (1308)	John la Zouche, 7th Baron Zouche	1468	1526	
Baron Audley of Heleigh (1313)	John Tuchet, 6th Baron Audley	1459	1490	
Baron Cobham of Kent (1313)	John Brooke, 7th Baron Cobham	1464	1512	
Baron Willoughby de Eresby (1313)	Robert Welles, 8th Baron Willoughby de Eresby	1462	1470	Died
Baron Willoughby de Eresby (1313)	Joan Welles, 9th Baroness Willoughby de Eresby	1470	1475	Died
Baron Willoughby de Eresby (1313)	Christopher Willoughby, 10th Baron Willoughby de Eresby	1475	1499	
Baron Dacre (1321)	Joan Dacre, 7th Baroness Dacre	1458	1486	
Baron FitzHugh (1321)	Henry FitzHugh, 5th Baron FitzHugh	1452	1472	Died
Baron FitzHugh (1321)	Richard FitzHugh, 6th Baron FitzHugh	1472	1487	
Baron Greystock (1321)	Ralph de Greystock, 5th Baron Greystock	1436	1487	
Baron Harington (1326)	Cecily Bonville, 7th Baroness Harington	1460	1530	
Baron Poynings (1337)	Eleanor Percy, 6th Baroness Poynings	1446	1482	
Baron Scrope of Masham (1350)	Thomas Scrope, 5th Baron Scrope of Masham	1455	1475	Died
Baron Scrope of Masham (1350)	Thomas Scrope, 6th Baron Scrope of Masham	1475	1493	
Baron Botreaux (1368)	Margaret Hungerford, 4th Baroness Botreaux	1462	1477	Died
Baron Botreaux (1368)	Mary Hungerford, 5th Baroness Botreaux	1477	1520	
Baron Scrope of Bolton (1371)	John Scrope, 5th Baron Scrope of Bolton	1459	1498	
Baron Lumley (1384)	Thomas Lumley, 2nd Baron Lumley	1461	1480	
Baron Bergavenny (1392)	George Nevill, 4th Baron Bergavenny	1447	1492	
Baron Grey of Codnor (1397)	Henry Grey, 4th Baron Grey of Codnor	1444	1496	
Baron Berkeley (1421)	William de Berkeley, 2nd Baron Berkeley	1463	1492	
Baron Latimer (1432)	Richard Neville, 2nd Baron Latimer	1469	1530	
Baron Dudley (1440)	John Sutton, 1st Baron Dudley	1440	1487	
Baron Sudeley (1441)	Ralph Boteler, 1st Baron Sudeley	1441	1473	Died, title extinct
Baron Lisle (1444)	Elizabeth Talbot, 3rd Baroness Lisle	1475	1487	Title previously held by Viscounts Lisle
Baron Saye and Sele (1447)	William Fiennes, 2nd Baron Saye and Sele	1450	1471	Died
Baron Saye and Sele (1447)	Henry Fiennes, 3rd Baron Saye and Sele	1471	1476	Died
Baron Saye and Sele (1447)	Richard Fiennes, 4th Baron Saye and Sele	1476	1501	
Baron Beauchamp of Powick (1447)	John Beauchamp, 1st Baron Beauchamp of Powick	1447	1475	Died
Baron Beauchamp of Powick (1447)	Richard Beauchamp, 2nd Baron Beauchamp	1475	1503	
Baron Stourton (1448)	William Stourton, 2nd Baron Stourton	1462	1479	
Baron Stourton (1448)	John Stourton, 3rd Baron Stourton	1479	1485	
Baron Bergavenny (1450)	Edward Nevill, 1st Baron Bergavenny	1450	1476	Died, Barony succeeded by his son, Baron Bergavenny (1392 creation), see above
Baron Berners (1455)	John Bourchier, 1st Baron Berners	1455	1474	Died
Baron Berners (1455)	John Bourchier, 2nd Baron Berners	1474	1533	
Baron Stanley (1456)	Thomas Stanley, 2nd Baron Stanley	1459	1504	
Baron Neville (1459)	Ralph Neville, 2nd Baron Neville	1472	1499	Attainder reversed in 1472
Baron Montagu (1461)	John Neville, 1st Baron Montagu	1461	1471	Created Marquess of Montagu in 1471, both titles forfeited in 1471
Baron Cromwell (1461)	Humphrey Bourchier, 1st Baron Cromwell	1461	1471	Died, title extinct
Baron Hastings de Hastings (1461)	William Hastings, 1st Baron Hastings	1461	1483	
Baron Ogle (1461)	Owen Ogle, 2nd Baron Ogle	1469	1485	
Baron Wenlock (1461)	John Wenlock, 1st Baron Wenlock	1461	1471	Died, title extinct
Baron Mountjoy (1465)	Walter Blount, 1st Baron Mountjoy	1465	1474	Died
Baron Mountjoy (1465)	Edward Blount, 2nd Baron Mountjoy	1474	1475	Died
Baron Mountjoy (1465)	John Blount, 3rd Baron Mountjoy	1475	1485	
Baron Howard (1470)	John Howard, 1st Baron Howard	1470	1485	New creation
Baron Dacre of Gilsland (1473)	Humphrey Dacre, 1st Baron Dacre	1473	1485	New creation

== Peerage of Scotland ==
Title	Holder	Date gained	Date lost	Notes
Duke of Rothesay (1398)	James Stewart, Duke of Rothesay	1473	1488	
Duke of Albany (1456)	Alexander Stewart, Duke of Albany	1456	1483	
Earl of Ross (1215)	John of Islay, Earl of Ross	1449	1476	Surrendered the Earldom to the Crown and created Lord of the Isles (below)
Earl of Sutherland (1235)	John de Moravia, 8th Earl of Sutherland	1460	1508	
Earl of Orkney (1379)	William Sinclair, Earl of Orkney	1410	1470	Resigned the Earldom
Earl of Angus (1389)	Archibald Douglas, 5th Earl of Angus	1463	1513	
Earl of Crawford (1398)	David Lindsay, 5th Earl of Crawford	1453	1495	
Earl of Menteith (1427)	Malise Graham, 1st Earl of Menteith	1427	1490	
Earl of Huntly (1445)	Alexander Gordon, 1st Earl of Huntly	1445	1470	Died
Earl of Huntly (1445)	George Gordon, 2nd Earl of Huntly	1470	1501	
Earl of Erroll (1452)	Nicholas Hay, 2nd Earl of Erroll	1462	1470	Died
Earl of Erroll (1452)	William Hay, 3rd Earl of Erroll	1470	1507	
Earl of Caithness (1455)	William Sinclair, 1st Earl of Caithness	1455	1476	Resigned
Earl of Caithness (1455)	William Sinclair, 2nd Earl of Caithness	1476	1513	
Earl of Argyll (1457)	Colin Campbell, 1st Earl of Argyll	1457	1493	
Earl of Atholl (1457)	John Stewart, 1st Earl of Atholl	1457	1512	
Earl of Morton (1458)	James Douglas, 1st Earl of Morton	1458	1493	
Earl of Rothes (1458)	George Leslie, 1st Earl of Rothes	1458	1490	
Earl Marischal (1458)	William Keith, 2nd Earl Marischal	1463	1483	
Earl of Mar and Garioch (1459)	John Stewart, Earl of Mar and Garioch	1459	1479	Died, title extinct
Earl of Buchan (1469)	James Stewart, 1st Earl of Buchan	1469	1499	
Lord Erskine (1429)	Thomas Erskine, 2nd Lord Erskine	1453	1494	de jure Earl of Mar
Lord Somerville (1430)	John Somerville, 3rd Lord Somerville	1456	1491	
Lord Haliburton of Dirleton (1441)	George Haliburton, 4th Lord Haliburton of Dirleton	1459	1492	
Lord Forbes (1442)	William Forbes, 3rd Lord Forbes	1462	1483	
Lord Crichton (1443)	William Crichton, 3rd Lord Crichton	1454	1484	
Lord Hamilton (1445)	James Hamilton, 1st Lord Hamilton	1445	1479	Died
Lord Hamilton (1445)	James Hamilton, 2nd Lord Hamilton	1479	1529	
Lord Maxwell (1445)	Robert Maxwell, 2nd Lord Maxwell	1454	1485	
Lord Glamis (1445)	Alexander Lyon, 2nd Lord Glamis	1459	1486	
Lord Graham (1445)	William Graham, 2nd Lord Graham	1466	1472	Died
Lord Graham (1445)	William Graham, 3rd Lord Graham	1472	1513	
Lord Lindsay of the Byres (1445)	John Lindsay, 1st Lord Lindsay	1445	1482	
Lord Saltoun (1445)	William Abernethy, 2nd Lord Saltoun	1460	1488	
Lord Gray (1445)	Andrew Gray, 2nd Lord Gray	1469	1514	
Lord Montgomerie (1449)	Alexander Montgomerie, 1st Lord Montgomerie	1449	1470	Died
Lord Montgomerie (1449)	Hugh Montgomerie, 2nd Lord Montgomerie	1470	1545	
Lord Sinclair (1449)	William Sinclair, 1st Lord Sinclair	1449	1484	Previously Earl of Caithness and Orkney
Lord Fleming (1451)	Robert Fleming, 1st Lord Fleming	1451	1494	
Lord Seton (1451)	George Seton, 1st Lord Seton	1451	1478	Died
Lord Seton (1451)	George Seton, 2nd Lord Seton	1478	1508	
Lord Borthwick (1452)	William Borthwick, 1st Lord Borthwick	1452	1470	Died
Lord Borthwick (1452)	William Borthwick, 2nd Lord Borthwick	1470	1484	
Lord Boyd (1454)	Robert Boyd, 1st Lord Boyd	1454	1482	
Lord Oliphant (1455)	Laurence Oliphant, 1st Lord Oliphant	1455	1498	
Lord Kennedy (1457)	Gilbert Kennedy, 1st Lord Kennedy	1457	1489	
Lord Livingston (1458)	James Livingston, 2nd Lord Livingston	1467	1497	
Lord Hailes (1458)	Patrick Hepburn, 1st Lord Hailes	1458	1483	
Lord Avandale (1459)	Andrew Stewart, 1st Lord Avandale	1459	1488	
Lord Cathcart (1460)	Alan Cathcart, 1st Lord Cathcart	1460	1497	
Lord Darnley (1460)	John Stewart, 1st Baron Darnley	1460	1495	
Lord Lovat (1464)	Hugh Fraser, 1st Lord Lovat	1464	1500	
Lord Innermeath (1470)	Walter Stewart, 1st Lord Innermeath	1470	1489	New creation
Lord Carlyle of Torthorwald (1473)	John Carlyle, 1st Lord Carlyle	1473	1501	New creation
Lord Home (1473)	Alexander Home, 1st Lord Home	1473	1490	New creation
Lord of the Isles (1476)	John of Islay, 1st Lord of the Isles	1476	1498	New creation for the former Earl of Ross (above)

== Peerage of Ireland ==
Title	Holder	Date gained	Date lost	Notes
Earl of Kildare (1316)	Thomas FitzGerald, 7th Earl of Kildare	1434	1478	Died
Earl of Kildare (1316)	Gerald FitzGerald, 8th Earl of Kildare	1478	1513	
Earl of Ormond (1328)	John Butler, 6th Earl of Ormond	1461	1478	Died
Earl of Ormond (1328)	Thomas Butler, 7th Earl of Ormond	1478	1515	
Earl of Desmond (1329)	James FitzGerald, 8th Earl of Desmond	1468	1487	
Earl of Waterford (1446)	John Talbot, 3rd Earl of Waterford	1460	1473	Died
Earl of Waterford (1446)	George Talbot, 4th Earl of Waterford	1473	1538	
Viscount Gormanston (1478)	Robert Preston, 1st Viscount Gormanston	1478	1503	New creation
Baron Athenry (1172)	Thomas II de Bermingham	1428	1473	Died
Baron Athenry (1172)	Thomas III de Bermingham	1473	1500	
Baron Kingsale (1223)	Nicholas de Courcy, 12th Baron Kingsale	1460	1476	Died
Baron Kingsale (1223)	James de Courcy, 13th Baron Kingsale	1476	1499	
Baron Kerry (1223)	Edmond Fitzmaurice, 9th Baron Kerry	1469	1498	
Baron Barry (1261)	William Barry, 8th Baron Barry	1420	1480	
Baron Gormanston (1370)	Robert Preston, 4th Baron Gormanston	1450	1503	Created Viscount Gormanston, see above
Baron Slane (1370)	Thomas Fleming, 6th Baron Slane	1463	1470	Died
Baron Slane (1370)	James Fleming, 7th Baron Slane	1470	1492	
Baron Howth (1425)	Robert St Lawrence, 3rd Baron Howth	1465	1485	
Baron Killeen (1449)	Edmond Plunkett, 4th Baron Killeen	1469	1510	
Baron Trimlestown (1461)	Robert Barnewall, 1st Baron Trimlestown	1461	1470	Died
Baron Trimlestown (1461)	Christopher Barnewall, 2nd Baron Trimlestown	1470	1513	
Baron Dunsany (1462)	Richard Plunkett, 2nd Baron of Dunsany	1463	1480	
Baron Portlester (1462)	Rowland FitzEustace, 1st Baron Portlester	1462	1496	
Baron Ratoath (1468)	Robert Bold, 1st Baron Ratoath	1468	1479	Died, title extinct

Preceded by List of peers 1460–1469	Lists of peers by decade 1470–1479	Succeeded by List of peers 1480–1489
