= Battle of Sauchieburn =

1488 battle in Scotland

- Part of the second rebellion against James III
Date	11 June 1488
Location	south of Stirling, Scotland 56°04′N 3°55′W
Result	Rebel victory

Belligerents
Scottish Crown	Rebels

Commanders and leaders
King James III †; Duke of Montrose; Earl of Menteith; Earl of Glencairn †; MacKenzie of Gairloch	Duke of Rothesay; Lord Home; Earl of Angus; Earl of Eglinton

Strength
c. 30,000	c. 18,000

Casualties and losses
Unknown, but higher than the rebels	Low

Registered battlefield
- Designated: 14 December 2012
- Reference no.: BTL38

The Battle of Sauchieburn was fought on 11 June 1488, at the side of Sauchie Burn, a stream about two miles (3 km) south of Stirling, Scotland. The battle was fought between the followers of King James III of Scotland and a large group of rebellious Scottish nobles including the future Alexander Home, 2nd Lord Home, who were nominally led by the king's 15-year-old son, James, Duke of Rothesay. James III was killed in the battle, and his son succeeded him as James IV.

== Father and son ==
James III had faced rebellion for months, with a complicated series of events leading to Sauchieburn. The rebels having made James, Duke of Rothesay their figurehead earlier in the year, James III became determined to get hold of his son and settle the matter. However he broke his written word that he would negotiate first, instead travelling south to Edinburgh from his stronghold in the north. This breaking of his word apparently caused some of his strong supporters to desert him, such as Huntly, Erroll, Marischal, and Glamis; they adopted a neutral stance on the issues. In May, James crossed the river to use Blackness as a base, with the Duke of Rothesay at Linlithgow. However, attempts to reach the prince at Linlithgow were defeated in a small skirmish, and James was forced back to Blackness, from where he fled, leaving behind those he had given as hostages to the rebels. By 16 May he was back in Edinburgh, and began spreading money around to raise supporters, including to his half uncle, John Stewart, 1st Earl of Atholl. At this point the rebels were geographically split, some at Stirling, some at Linlithgow. James again took the initiative with a sudden move over to Fife with his supporters and their men, advancing on Stirling, where on 10 June he took the rebels by surprise, driving them southwards. This left James with the town of Stirling, perhaps not the castle, from where he advanced on 11 June to meet the combined forces of the rebels driven from Stirling and those who had come from Linlithgow in support. To aid him in battle, James III carried with him the sword of Robert the Bruce. Dr John Ireland heard the King's confession. His army was arrayed by the advocate John Ross of Montgrenan and battle began.

The battle went badly for the Royalists. Persistent legends, based on the highly coloured and unreliable accounts of sixteenth-century chroniclers such as Adam Abell, Robert Lindsay of Pitscottie, John Lesley, and George Buchanan, claim that James III was assassinated at Milltown, near Bannockburn, soon after the battle. There is no contemporary evidence to support this account, nor the allegation that he fled the battle, nor the tale that his assassin impersonated a priest in order to approach James.

Pitscottie provided a story that, on the eve of the battle, his ancestor David Lord Lindsay of the Byres presented James III with a "great grey horse" that would carry him faster than any other horse into or away from the battle. Unfortunately, the horse threw the King during the battle, and James III was either killed in the fall, or was finished off by enemy soldiers. The sword of Robert the Bruce and a chest of the old king's treasure was recovered from the battlefield by Walter Simpson.

The Duke of Rothesay was crowned at Scone Abbey at the end of June, and reigned as King James IV for 25 years. James IV bore intense guilt for the indirect role which he had played in the death of his father. He decided to do penance for his sin, constantly wearing an iron belt around his waist, next to the skin, to which he added weight every year throughout his life.

The battlefield is currently under research to be inventoried and protected by Historic Scotland, under the Scottish Historical Environment Policy of 2009.

== Participants ==
Some of the participants in the Battle of Sauchieburn included:

- Royalists:
  - Alexander Cunningham, 1st Earl of Glencairn, slain in the battle;
  - Malise Graham, 1st Earl of Menteith;
  - David Lindsay, 1st Duke of Montrose;
  - Lord Erskine;
  - Lord Graham;
  - Lord Maxwell;
  - Sir William Ruthven, 1st Laird of Ruthven;
  - David Lindsay, 2nd Lord Lindsay who, in a later chronicle account, gave James III the horse that threw him;
  - Sir Thomas Sempill of Eliotston, Sheriff of Renfrew, killed in battle;
  - William Douglas of Cavers and his followers.
  - Roger Grierson I of Lag, Fatally wounded
  - The troops were largely from Scotland's northern counties, plus some burgh levies.
- Rebels:
  - Alexander Home, 2nd Lord Home;
  - Archibald Douglas, 5th Earl of Angus;
  - Patrick Hepburn, 1st Earl of Bothwell;
  - Lord Gray;
  - Lord (Hugh) Mongomerie, 1st Earl of Elington;
  - The troops were largely from East Lothian, the Merse, Galloway, and the border counties.
