= Laurence Oliphant =

Laurence Oliphant is the name of:

- Laurence Oliphant, 1st Lord Oliphant (1434–1498), Scottish nobleman
- Laurence Oliphant, 3rd Lord Oliphant (died 1566), Scottish nobleman
- Laurence Oliphant, 4th Lord Oliphant (1529–1593), Scottish nobleman
- Laurence Oliphant, 5th Lord Oliphant
- Laurence Oliphant (author) (1829–1888), British MP for Stirling Burghs, international traveller, diplomat and mystic
- Laurence Oliphant (Jacobite) (1691–1767), army officer
- Laurence Oliphant (Scottish politician) (1791–1862), MP for Perth, 1832
- Laurence Oliphant (British Army officer) (1846–1914), British Army General
