= Patrick Lyon, 1st Lord Glamis =

Scottish nobleman

Patrick Lyon, 1st Lord Glamis (1402 – 21 March 1459) P.C. was a Scottish nobleman, created Lord Glamis on 28 June 1445.

He was a son of Sir John Lyon of Glamis (c. 1377 – c. 1435) and Elizabeth Graham, daughter of Sir Patrick Graham of Dundaff and Kincardine and Euphemia Stewart, Countess of Strathearn. Sir John was the son of Sir John Lyon (d. 1382) and Princess Joanna Stewart, daughter of Robert II of Scotland.

Patrick Lyon was hostage in England for King James I from 1424 until 9 November 1427 when he was exchanged for another hostage. He was one of the Lords Auditors (1450–1451) and Master of the King's Household (1450–1452) to King James II. He was Ambassador to England (1451) and again (1455). He was Keeper of the Castles of Kildrummy, Kindrocht and Balveny (1456–1459).

Late in 1427 or soon thereafter he married Isabel, daughter of Sir Walter Ogilvie of Lintrethan, Treasurer of Scotland. They had at least five children:

- Alexander Lyon, 2nd Lord Glamis
- John Lyon, 3rd Lord Glamis
- William Lyon of Peetanya / Pettanys and of Easter Ogil
- Elizabeth, the wife of Alexander Robertson of Strowane
- Violetta, the wife of Hugh Fraser, 1st Lord Lovat

His widow Isobel, Lady Glamis, married Gilbert Kennedy, 1st Lord Kennedy. In 1484 she sued John Kennedy for silver ware which he claimed to have bought from Gilbert Kennedy, 1st Lord Kennedy.

Peerage of Scotland
New creation	Lord Glamis; 1445–1459	Succeeded by Alexander Lyon
