= David Lindsay, 2nd Lord Lindsay =

David Lindsay, 2nd Lord Lindsay of the Byres (died 1490) was a Scottish lord of parliament and supporter of King James III of Scotland.

== Battle of Sauchieburn ==
Lindsay of the Byres remained a supporter of James III of Scotland after his son Prince James had left Stirling Castle as the figurehead of a rival faction. He was present at the battle of Sauchieburn at Bannockburn on 11 June 1488. James III was killed. The historian Norman Macdougall finds the story of Robert Lindsay of Pitscottie that the King tried to escape on a horse provided by his ancestor Lord Lindsay unlikely.

Peerage of Scotland
Preceded by John Lindsay	Lord Lindsay of the Byres; 1482–1490	Succeeded by John Lindsay
