= Alexander Lyon, 2nd Lord Glamis =

Scottish nobleman

Alexander Lyon, 2nd Lord of Glamis (c. 1430–1486), was a Scottish nobleman.

The son of Patrick Lyon, 1st Lord Glamis (d. 1459), he was Keeper of Kildrummy Castle and Kindrochit Castle from his father's death until 1462. He later sat on the King's Council.

He married Agnes Crichton, daughter of William Crichton, 1st Lord Crichton, Chancellor of Scotland, but had no surviving children. His title was inherited by his younger brother John Lyon.

== Fictional portrayals ==
- The Lion's Whelp (1997) by Nigel Tranter. Set during 1437–1460, during the reign of James II of Scotland, the book describes the boy-king's time under regents Archibald Douglas, 5th Earl of Douglas, Lord Crichton, and Sir Alexander Livingston, and the plot to kill William Douglas, 6th Earl of Douglas at the "Black Dinner", seen through the eyes of Alexander Lyon, Master and then 2nd Lord of Glamis. The book ends with the death of James.

Peerage of Scotland
Preceded by Patrick Lyon	Lord Glamis; 1459–1486	Succeeded by John Lyon
