= Laurence Oliphant, 3rd Lord Oliphant =

Scottish nobleman

Laurence Oliphant, 3rd Lord Oliphant (died 1566) was a Scottish nobleman.

== Life ==
He was the son of Colin, Master of Oliphant (killed at the battle of Flodden in 1513), by Lady Elizabeth Keith, second daughter of William Keith, 3rd Earl Marischal. He succeeded his grandfather John Oliphant, 2nd Lord Oliphant, in 1516, and was one of the Scottish nobles taken prisoner at the battle of Solway Moss on 25 November 1542, reaching Newark on 15 December, on the way to London. The annual value of his lands was then estimated at two thousand merks Scots.

Oliphant remained in England in the custody of Sir Thomas Lee, knt., but on 1 July 1543 was allowed to be ransomed for eight hundred merks sterling, on condition that, along with other captive Scottish nobles, he should acknowledge Henry VIII of England as lord-superior, should co-operate in procuring him the government of Scotland, and should exert his influence to get the infant Queen Mary delivered to Henry, to be brought up in England. He later made no attempt to fulfil these pledges. In 1560 at a meeting at Aberdeen he nominally adhered to the Protestant cause, but probably never joined against Queen Mary.

Oliphant died on 26 March 1566.

== Family ==
By Margaret, eldest daughter of James Sandilands of Cruvie, Oliphant had three sons and four daughters. The sons were:

- Laurence Oliphant, 4th Lord Oliphant;
- Peter, ancestor of the Oliphants of Langton; and
- William.

The daughters were:

- Catherine, married first to Sir Alexander Oliphant of Kellie, and secondly to George Dundas of Dundas;
- Margaret, married first to William Murray of Abercaimy, and secondly to James Clephane of Carslogie;
- Jean, to William Moncriefie of Moncriefie; and
- Lilias, to Robert Lundie of Balgonie.

== Notes ==
Attribution

This article incorporates text from a publication now in the public domain: Lee, Sidney, ed. (1895). "Oliphant, Laurence (d.1566)". Dictionary of National Biography. Vol. 42. London: Smith, Elder & Co.

Peerage of Scotland
Preceded by John Oliphant	Lord Oliphant; 1516–1566	Succeeded by Laurence Oliphant
