= Robert Lindsay of Pitscottie =

Scottish chronicler and author

Robert Lindsay of Pitscottie (also Lindesay or Lyndsay; c. 1532–1580) was a Scottish chronicler, author of The Historie and Chronicles of Scotland, 1436–1565, the first history of Scotland to be composed in Scots rather than Latin.

== Biography ==
Of the family of the Lindsays of the Byres, a grandson of Patrick Lindsay, 4th Lord Lindsay, Robert was born at Pitscottie, in the parish of Ceres, Fife, which he held in lease at a later period. His Historie, the only work by which he is remembered, is described as a continuation of that of Hector Boece, translated by John Bellenden. Although it sometimes degenerates into a mere chronicle of short entries, it is not without passages of great picturesqueness. Sir Walter Scott made use of it in his narrative poem Marmion; and, in spite of its inaccuracy in details, it is useful for the social history of the period. Lindesay's share in the Historie was generally supposed to end with 1565; but Dr Aeneas Mackay considers that the frank account of the events connected with Mary, Queen of Scots, between 1565 and 1575 contained in one of the manuscripts is by his hand and was only suppressed because it was too faithful in its record of contemporary affairs. The Historie was first published in 1728. A complete edition of the text, based on the Laing MS. No. 218 in the University of Edinburgh, was published by the Scottish Text Society in 1899 under the editorship of Aeneas Mackay. The manuscript, formerly in the possession of John Scott of Halkshill, is fuller, and, though in a later hand, is, on the whole, a better representative of Lindsay's text.

According to the Biographical Dictionary of Eminent Scotsmen:

As to the Chronicles themselves, it is not perhaps very easy to determine in what language they should be spoken of. They present a strange compound of endless and aimless garrulity, simplicity, credulity, and graphic delineation; the latter, however, evidently the effect not of art or design, but of a total want of them. He describes events with all the circumstantiality of an eyewitness, and with all the prolixity of one who is determined to leave nothing untold, however trifling it may be.

But his credulity, in particular, seems to have been boundless, and is remarkable even for the credulous age in which he lived. He appears to have believed, without question, every thing which was told him; and, believing it, has carefully recorded it. After detailing at some length, and with great gravity, all the circumstances of the mysterious summons of Plotcock, previous to the battle of Flodden, "Verily," he says, "the author of this, that caused me write the manner of the summons, was a landed gentleman, who was at that time twenty years of age, and was in the town the time of the said summons; and thereafter, when the field was stricken, he swore to me, there was no man that escaped that was called in this summons, but that one man alone which made his protestation."

The earnest and honest simplicity of the good old chronicler, however, is exceedingly amusing. He aims at nothing beyond a mere record of what he conceived to be facts, and these he goes on detailing, with a great deal of incoherence, and all the unintellectual precision, of an artificial process, neither feeling, passion, nor mind ever appearing to mingle in the slightest degree with his labours. These characteristics of the chronicles of Lindsay have greatly impaired their credibility, and have almost destroyed all confidence in them as authorities.
