= John Lyon, 3rd Lord Glamis =

Scottish Nobleman

John Lyon, 3rd Lord of Glamis (1431 – 1 April 1497) was a Scottish nobleman.

Born in Angus, he was the second son of Patrick Lyon, 1st Lord Glamis, and inherited the title on his brother's death in 1486. He attended university, possibly in Paris. He was active in royal service during the early reign of James IV of Scotland, and was appointed justiciar north of Forth.

Before 1479 he married Elizabeth Scrymgeour, the daughter of Sir James (aka Seumas) Scrymgeour of Glassary & Dudhope, constable of Dundee and they had four sons and seven daughters. The eldest, John Lyon, succeeded his father as Lord Glamis. The three younger sons: David Lyon of Cossins, William and George, were killed at the Battle of Flodden in 1513.

Lord Glamis was buried in Glamis Kirk, Angus.

Peerage of Scotland
Preceded by Alexander Lyon	Lord Glamis; 1486–1497	Succeeded by John Lyon
