= Patrick Lindsay, 4th Lord Lindsay =

Tudor advisor and counsellor

Patrick Lindsay, 4th Lord Lindsay of the Byres (died 1526) was a reputed advisor of James IV of Scotland, and counsellor to Margaret Tudor.

== Career ==
The 16th century writer Robert Lindsay of Pitscottie gave Patrick Lord Lindsay a number of speeches in his chronicle History of Scotland. Lindsay was said to have advised the nobles of Scotland to fight at Flodden on 9 September 1513 but send James IV of Scotland home. In Pitscottie's story, Lindsay compared the forthcoming encounter to a wager of a gold rose-noble against a bent halfpenny.

After the battle of Flodden, in December 1513, Lord Lindsay was appointed a counsellor to Margaret Tudor. The arrangement did not last as Margaret married the Earl of Angus and John Stewart, Duke of Albany became regent. In May 1524 Regent Albany appointed Patrick and his son and grandson joint Sheriffs of Fife.

== Family ==
Patrick married Isabella Pitcairn, he was succeeded as Lord Lindsay by his grandson, John Lindsay, son of John Lindsay of Pitcruvy, Master of Lindsay.

== Lord Lindsay and Pitscottie ==
As the historian Norman Macdougall notes, Patrick was the grandfather of the author Robert Lindsay of Pitscottie. This family connection may lend some weight to some of the hearsay stories in Pitscottie's chronicle, although the relationship also caused Pitscottie to overemphasise the roles of the Lindsays of Byres.

Peerage of Scotland
Preceded by John Lindsay	Lord Lindsay of the Byres; 1497–c.1526	Succeeded by John Lindsay
