= James Fleming, 7th Baron Slane =

Irish nobleman

James Fleming (bef. 1442–1492) was an Irish nobleman, who sat as a member of the House of Lords in the Irish Parliament in 1491 and also served as High Sheriff of Meath.

James was the son of William Fleming, a younger son of the 2nd Baron, and his wife, the former Janet Rochfort. He succeeded to the title of his first cousin once removed, Thomas Fleming, 6th Baron Slane, in 1471. The family estates, which had been taken into royal custody, were restored to him by an Act of Parliament in the session of 1471-2. He was also given leave of absence to go to England. He was Sheriff of Meath in 1471-2.

He was one of the eleven Irish barons who came to Greenwich at Henry VII of England's summons in 1489; to their embarrassment, they were served at the table by the former pretender to Henry's Crown, Lambert Simnel, whose cause most of the Irish nobility including Lord Slane had supported. After the downfall of Simnel's cause at the Battle of Stoke in 1487, the King treated him with great clemency, pardoning him and giving him a job in the Royal kitchens, from which he was eventually promoted to the office of Royal Falconer. The Irish nobility had been treated with similar mercy, and almost all of them received a royal pardon, but clearly, the King could not resist playing a joke on Simnel's former allies, who, he once remarked, would "Crown an ape" to gain more power.

Lord Slane married Elizabeth Welles, daughter of Sir William Welles (d. 1463), Lord Chancellor of Ireland, and his wife Anne Barnewall; Elizabeth, who had previously been married to the second Baron Killeen, died in 1506. Their children were:

- Christopher Fleming, 8th Baron Slane
- two younger sons, Thomas Fleming and Sir George Fleming, from whom later Barons of Slane were descended.

The Annals of Ulster state that James' death was due to the first recorded Irish outbreak of sweating sickness, Ireland having apparently escaped the first English epidemic of 1485. However, it has been suggested more recently that the actual cause of death was typhus.

== Sources ==
- G. E. C., ed. Geoffrey F. White. The Complete Peerage. (London: St. Catherine Press, 1953) Vol. XII, Part 1, p. 8-9.

Peerage of Ireland
| Preceded by Thomas Fleming | Baron Slane; 1470–1492 | Succeeded by Christopher Fleming |
