= John Lindsay, 6th Earl of Crawford =

John Lindsay, 6th Earl of Crawford (before 1483–1513) was an Earl of Crawford.

He was the son of David Lindsay, 1st Duke of Montrose and Elizabeth Hamilton, and married Marion Home.

He fought with Huntly, Argyle, Marichal and Lovat against Donald Dhu in 1504.

In 1512 he was accused of murdering his brother, Alexander Lindsay. Called to appear in court in Dundee with his cousins David Lindsay and Alexander Lindsay, he was declared a rebel.

He died at the Battle of Flodden.

Peerage of Scotland
Preceded by David Lindsay	Earl of Crawford; 1495–1513	Succeeded by Alexander Lindsay
