= John Oliphant, 2nd Lord Oliphant =

Scottish landowner

John Oliphant, 2nd Lord Oliphant (died 1516) was a Scottish landowner.

He was the eldest son of Laurence Oliphant, 1st Lord Oliphant and Elizabeth Hay, a daughter of William Hay, 1st Earl of Erroll.

He is sometimes regarded as the 5th Lord Oliphant, Aberdalgie and Dupplin.

He sent his servant to the king with a gift of plums in August 1503, at the time of his wedding to Margaret Tudor. He, or his father, had sent the king a gift of plums in August 1497. James IV invited him to the baptism of his son in February 1507 at Holyrood. In March Oliphant was asked to spend Easter at court at Holyrood Palace.

In September 1507, James IV gave him a letter of remission or forgiveness for his crimes against Lord Drummond and Earl of Buchan. Oliphant had come to Drymen and Balloch and cast down dykes.

== Marriage and family ==
John Oliphant married Elizabeth Campbell, a daughter of Colin Campbell, 1st Earl of Argyll. Their children included:

- John Oliphant, Master of Oliphant
- Colin Oliphant, Master of Oliphant, who was killed at the battle of Flodden. He had married Elizabeth Keith, a daughter of William Keith, 2nd Earl Marischal. His children included Laurence Oliphant, 3rd Lord Oliphant

Peerage of Scotland
Preceded by Laurence Oliphant	Lord Oliphant; 1498–1516	Succeeded by Laurence Oliphant
