= Christopher Fleming, 8th Baron Slane =

Irish nobleman

Christopher Fleming (bef. 1474–1517) was an Irish nobleman, who was Lord High Treasurer of Ireland from 1514 until his death. He succeeded as 8th Baron Slane in 1492.

== Family ==
Christopher was the eldest son of James Fleming, 7th Baron Slane. His mother was Elizabeth Welles (died 1506), daughter of William Welles, Lord Chancellor of Ireland, and his wife Anne Barnewall, and widow of the 3rd Baron Killeen. He married firstly Lady Eilis FitzGerald, daughter of Gerald FitzGerald, 8th Earl of Kildare by his first wife Alison FitzEustace, daughter of Rowland FitzEustace, 1st Baron Portlester and his third wife Margaret d'Artois. After Eilis's death he married secondly Elizabeth Stucley, daughter of Nicholas Stucley of Affeton Castle, Devon, head of an ancient Devonshire family and ancestor of the Stucley baronets, and his wife Thomasine Cockworthy.

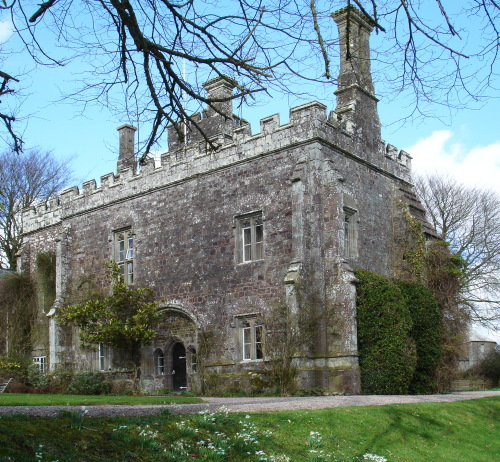
Affeton Manor, Devon, home of Lord Slane's second wife Elizabeth Stucley

By his first wife Christopher had three children:

- James Fleming, 9th Baron Slane, who married Alison, daughter of Sir Robert Dillon, Chief Justice of the Irish Common Pleas
- Eleanor
- Catherine, who married Sir Christopher Barnewall and was the main heiress of her brother James, who died childless.

On the 9th Baron's death, the barony passed to his cousin Thomas Fleming, 10th Baron Slane.

== Slane Friary ==
Today Christopher Fleming is best remembered for his religious foundations. In 1512, on the site of an earlier abbey at Slane, he built a friary and college for the Franciscan order. The friary was later abandoned, but its ruins are still one of the best-known sights of Slane.

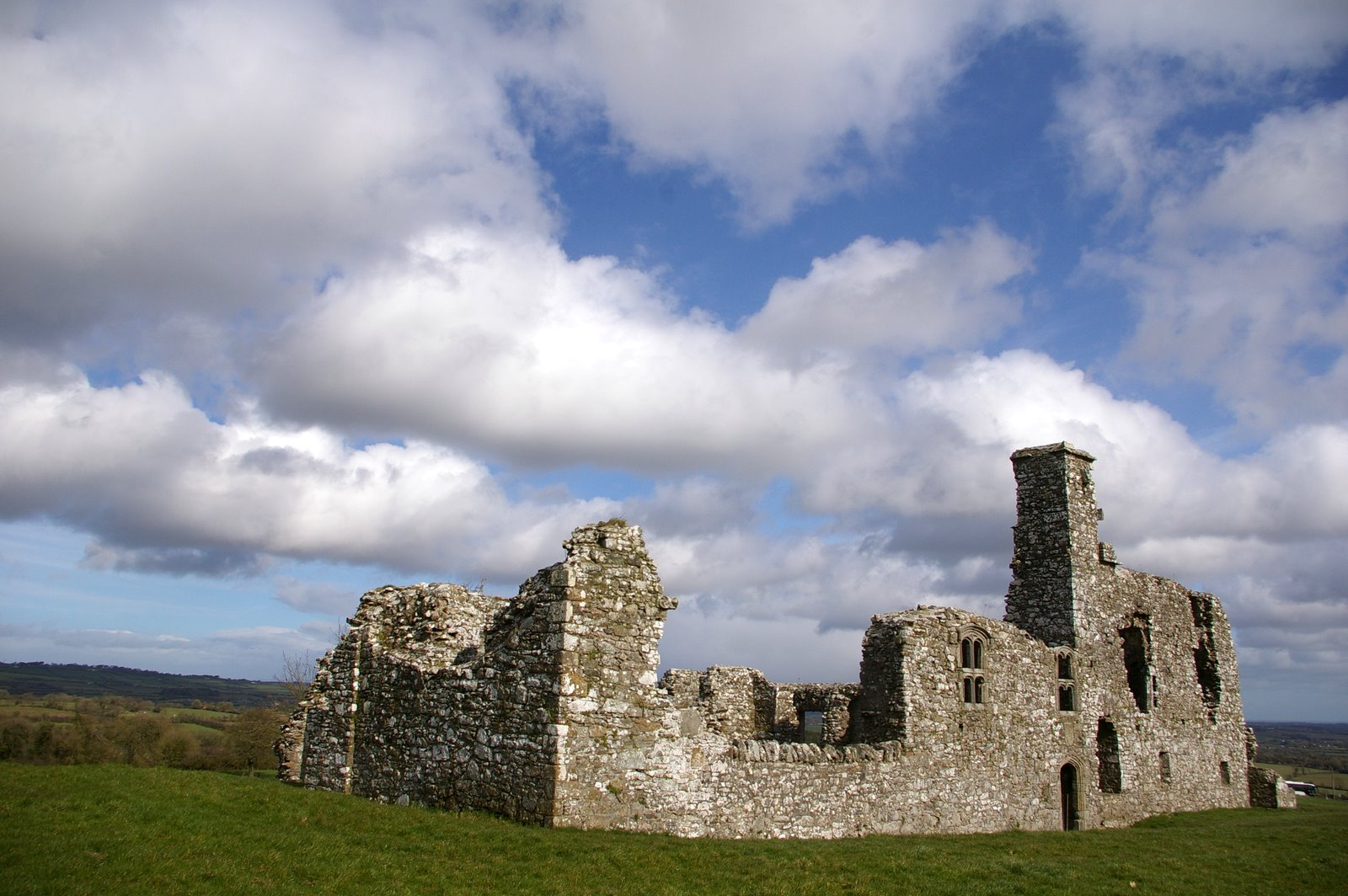
Ruins of Slane Friary

== Sources ==
- G. E. C., ed. Geoffrey F. White. The Complete Peerage. (London: St. Catherine Press, 1953) Vol. XII, Part 1, p. 3-4.

Peerage of Ireland
Preceded by James Fleming	Baron Slane; 1492–1517	Succeeded by James Fleming
