= David Lindsay, 1st Duke of Montrose =

Scottish nobleman

David Lindsay, 1st Duke of Montrose (1440 – 25 December 1495) was a Scottish nobleman.

He was the son of Alexander Lindsay, 4th Earl of Crawford, and inherited the Earldom of Crawford on his father's death in 1453. During his political career, he held the posts of Lord High Admiral of Scotland, Master of the Royal Household, Great Chamberlain, and Justiciar. He went frequently as an ambassador to England.

In 1488, he was created Duke of Montrose, the first Scotsman not of royal blood to be granted a Dukedom. Lindsay had won the favour of James III by remaining loyal to the king during the rebellion of his son Prince James. Lindsay was deprived of his dukedom by James IV when he acceded to the throne later that year, but it was restored in 1489 for life only. On his death in 1495, the title became extinct, although the Earldom continues to this day.

== Family ==
He married Elizabeth Hamilton, daughter of James Hamilton, 1st Lord Hamilton in 1459. They had three children before divorcing in the 1480s.

- Alexander Lindsay, Master of Crawford (1485 – 16 September 1489)
- Elizabeth Lindsay (born 1495)
- John Lindsay, 6th Earl of Crawford (c. 1495–1513)

== Arms ==
Coat of arms of David Lindsay, 1st Duke of Montrose

Coronet
Coronet of a Duke
Crest
Out of a Ducal Coronet Or, a Swan's Head, neck and wings proper.
Escutcheon
Gules, a Fess chequy Argent and Azure, en surtout an Inescutcheon Argent, charged with a Rose Gules.
Supporters
On either side a Lion guardant Gules.
Motto
ENDURE FORT (Endure bravely)

Peerage of Scotland
New creation	Duke of Montrose; 1488–1495	Extinct
Preceded by Alexander Lindsay	Earl of Crawford; 1453–1495	Succeeded by John Lindsay
Military offices
Preceded by William Sinclair	Lord High Admiral of Scotland	Succeeded by Alexander Stewart
Political offices
Unknown	Master of the Household of Scotland	Unknown
Preceded by James Stewart	Great Chamberlain; 1483–1489	Succeeded by Alexander Home
