= Laurence Oliphant, 1st Lord Oliphant =

Scottish nobleman (c. 1438 – 1498)

Laurence Oliphant, 1st Lord Oliphant (c. 1438 – 1498) was a Scottish peer.

== Origins of the Title ==
Laurence Oliphant was first styled as Lord Oliphant in July 1455, one month after he came of age.

== Early life ==
Laurence Oliphant was the eldest son and heir of Sir John Oliphant of Aberdalgie and Isobel, daughter of Sir Walter Ogilvie of Auchterhouse, Hereditary Sheriff of Angus. Born around 1438, his father was killed fighting in a feud between his Ogilvie brother-in-law and the Lindsays on 23 January 1445 when Laurence was seven or eight years old. He had brothers James Oliphant, 1st of Ardchailzie; John Oliphant and sisters Christian who married Alexander Blair of Balthayock; Elizabeth married James Herring of Tullibole and Lethendy and Margaret who married Sir Henry Wardlaw of Torrie. In 1450, King James II granted "the ward and marriage" of Laurence to Sir David Hay of Yester.

== Marriage and children ==
Laurence Oliphant married Elizabeth Hay, a daughter of William Hay, 1st Earl of Erroll. Their children included John Oliphant, 2nd Lord Oliphant (d. 1516).

Peerage of Scotland
| New creation | Lord Oliphant; 1455–1498 | Succeeded by John Oliphant |
