= Ralph Ogle, 3rd Baron Ogle =

Ralph Ogle, 3rd Baron Ogle (1468–1512) was an English Baron from Northumberland, England.

== Family Origins ==
Ralph Ogle was born on 7 November 1468 in Bothal, Northumberland, the son of Owen Ogle, 2nd Baron Ogle (1440–1486) and Eleanor Hilton.

== Career ==
In 1503 Ralph was charged with escorting Princess Margaret Tudor on her way to her marriage with James IV King of Scots.

He was summoned to parliament from 17 October 1509 to 29 November 1511.

== Marriage and Family ==
Ralph married Margaret Gascoigne, daughter of Sir William Gascoigne and Margaret Percy, daughter of Henry Percy, 3rd Earl of Northumberland. Ralph and Margaret had at least six children:

- Robert Ogle, 4th Baron Ogle (1490–1530) who married Anne Lumley
- Sir William Ogle
- John Ogle
- Anne Ogle, married Sir John Delaval, Sheriff of Northumberland (died 3 January 1572), & married Humphrey Lisle
- Dorothy Ogle who married Sir Thomas Forster. Second marriage to Thomas Grey of Horton.
- Margery Ogle who married George Harbottle

He died on 16 January 1512 in Morpeth, Northumberland and there is a tomb to him and Margaret, who is also said to have died in 1512, in St Andrew's church, Bothal, Northumberland.

Peerage of England
Preceded by Owen Ogle	Baron Ogle; 1486–1512	Succeeded by Robert Ogle
