= Thomas III de Bermingham =

Anglo-Irish peer (died 1500)

Thomas III de Bermingham was an Anglo-Irish lord who died in 1500.

The succession to the lordship is unclear for much of the 15th and early 16th centuries. Thomas III's exact relationship to the previous lord is uncertain, though the Complete Peerage states he was his son.

Peerage of Ireland
Preceded by Thomas II de Bermingham	Baron Athenry; 1473–1500	Succeeded by Meiler de Bermingham
