= George Seton, 2nd Lord Seton =

Scottish ambassador

George Seton, 3rd Lord Seton, of Seton, East Lothian, (c. 1415 – 1478) was a Lord of Parliament, Lord Auditor, and a Scottish ambassador.

== Family ==
George was the son and heir of William Seton, Master of Seton, who was killed at the battle of Verneuil on 17 August 1424. Sir William died before his father, the 2nd Lord Seton, and so George succeeded his grandfather John Seton, 2nd Lord Seton, when he was a minor, before 1434, and reached his majority before 2 November 1437.

== Career ==
He was knighted before 18 September 1439 and had a Safe-conduct to pass through England dated 23 April 1448, when he accompanied Lord Chancellor Crichton's Embassy to Flanders, France, and Burgundy. He served on a jury in a perambulation by Thomas de Cranstoun, Justiciar, on 22 March 1451, where he is styled "Sir George de Seton of that Ilk".

As a Lord of Parliament ('George domini Setoun') he sat in the Scottish Parliament as such on 14 June 1452.

He was a Privy Councillor by 11 July 1458 and made a Lord Auditor in 1469/70. He again had a Safe-conduct to travel to England as Ambassador on 16 March 1472 (1471/2), and once more on 21 April 1473.

== Marriage and death ==
He married twice: (1), before 8 January 1436/7, Margaret, only child of John Stewart, 2nd Earl of Buchan and Constable of France, by his spouse Elizabeth, only daughter of Archibald Douglas, 4th Earl of Douglas; (2), before 8 January 1460/1. Christian, née Murray, said to have been of the house of Tullibardine.

The 3rd Lord Seton died shortly after 15 July 1478 at the Black Friars, Edinburgh, and was buried there.

By his first wife, Lord Seton had only one son and heir:

- John, Master of Seton, died before 19 July 1476. Because John died before his father, his son (the grandson of the 3rd Lord Seton) succeeded as Lord Seton:
  - George Seton, 4th Lord Seton (d. 1507/8).
