= William Graham, 1st Earl of Montrose =

Scottish Lord of Parliament

- Coat of arms
- Tenure: 1503–1513
- Predecessor: New creation
- Successor: William Graham, 2nd Earl of Montrose
- Born: 1464
- Died: 9 September 1513 (aged 48–49)
- Father: William Graham, 2nd Lord Graham
- Mother: Lady Helen Douglas

William Graham, 1st Earl of Montrose (1464 – 9 September 1513) was a Scottish Lord of Parliament, who was raised to an earldom by James IV of Scotland and who died with his monarch at the Battle of Flodden.

Starting his career in the Parliament of Scotland in 1479, Graham supported James III of Scotland in his struggle against his rebellious son James IV. Following the death of James III, Graham switched his allegiance and supported James IV. He sat in the first two parliaments of the new king. He was created 1st Earl of Montrose in 1503. During the War of the League of Cambrai (1508–1516), Montrose joined James IV in a failed invasion of the Kingdom of England. He was killed in battle, alongside his brother, George Graham of Callendar, (Calendar) and his brother-in-law, Sir William Edmonstone of Duntreath.The English troops were instructed to take no prisoners during the Battle of Flodden, which explains the exceptional mortality amongst the Scottish nobility in this battle.

== Origins ==
Montrose was the eldest son and heir of William Graham, 2nd Lord Graham by Eleanor, also known as Helen or Elene, the daughter of William Douglas, 2nd Earl of Angus. The Grahams were a long-established family of Norman origin, who first rose to prominence in the reign of David I.

== Career ==
He succeeded to the peerage as the 3rd Lord Graham, as a minor, on the death of his father in about 1471 and sat in the Parliaments of James III in 1479, 1481, 1482 and 1487. He supported James III in his struggle with his son and was present at the Battle of Sauchieburn on 11 June 1488. He was then received into the favour of James IV, as was the case for many of James III's supporters, and sat in his first two Parliaments of 6 October 1488 and 6 February 1492.

In 1503, William Graham was created 1st Earl of Montrose (from his ancestral estate at Old Montrose) and he sat, in that capacity, in the Parliament of 3 February 1506.

Montrose accompanied James IV on his invasion of England in 1513 and was killed at the Battle of Flodden on 9 September 1513, together with his brother, George Graham of Callendar, (Calendar) and his brother-in-law, Sir William Edmonstone of Duntreath.

== Estates ==
Not long before his elevation to an earldom, Montrose acquired the estates of Aberuthven and Inchbrakie in Perthshire. Shortly after the creation of the earldom, on 3 March 1505, his ancestral lands of Old Montrose were erected into the free barony and earldom of Montrose and were re-granted to him on his surrender of them to the King. On the same day, he had three other charters to three other new baronies: Kincardine, Aberuthven and Kynnaber, in Forfarshire.

== Family ==
Montrose married first (on 25 November 1479) Annabel Drummond, one of the five daughters of John Drummond, 1st Lord Drummond, secondly Janet Edmonstone, daughter of Sir Archibald Edmonstone of Duntreath and thirdly Christian Wawane of Seggie, in Fife, the widow of Patrick Haliburton, 5th Lord Haliburton.

By his first wife, Montrose had:

- William Graham, 2nd Earl of Montrose
- Walter Graham, of Little Cairnie.

By his third wife, Montrose had a further son, Patrick Graham of Inchbraikie (grandfather of Bishop George Graham), to which lands Patrick received a charter from his father on 20 June 1513.

Montrose also had three daughters:

- Helen Graham, who married (dispensation 13 July 1509) Humphrey Colquhoun, Younger of Luss
- Nicolas Graham (a daughter of Graham's second marriage), who married (11 February 1504) John Moray, 6th of Abercairney
- Elizabeth Graham (a daughter of Graham's second marriage), who married (February 1514) Walter Drummond, Master of Drummond, the grandson of John Drummond, 1st Lord Drummond
- Margaret Graham (a daughter of Graham's second marriage), who married (contract 10 July 1510) Sir John Somerville of Cambusnethan
- Jean Graham, who married David Graham, 3rd of Fintry.

Other reputed (but doubtful) progeny include Andrew Graham, who was consecrated Bishop of Dunblane in 1575, and Jean Graham, who was said to have had a daughter by William Chisholm (I), who was consecrated Bishop of Dunblane in 1526.

== Sources ==
- Goodwin, George (2013). Fatal Rivalry: Flodden 1513. Phoenix (Orion Books Ltd). ISBN 978-1-78022-136-6.

Peerage of Scotland
New creation	Earl of Montrose; 1503–1513	Succeeded by William Graham
Preceded by William Graham	Lord Graham c.1471–1513	Succeeded by William Graham
