= Lord Oliphant =

Ttitle in the Peerage of Scotland

- Gules three Crescents Argent
- Creation date: July 1455
- Peerage: Peerage of Scotland
- First holder: Laurence Oliphant
- Last holder: (12th) David Oliphant of Bachilton
- Extinction date: October 1770

Lord Oliphant was a title in the Peerage of Scotland. It was created twice and de facto under Peerage Law a third time. The first creation is in abeyance of the law, the second extinct and the third creation is dormant.

The title was certainly established by 1455 for Laurence Oliphant, 1st or 4th Lord Oliphant, but this creation was resigned to the Crown on the death of the fifth (or eighth) lord in 1631. It was created again that same year for Patrick Oliphant (second creation), but this second creation became extinct in 1748 on the death of the tenth lord (or, fifth of second creation). A third creation was established de facto under peerage law on 15 March 1750 when William Oliphant of Langton sat and voted at the General Election of Peers but became dormant on the death of David Oliphant in 1770.

== The Origins of the Title ==
The earliest mention of Lord Oliphant is around the Tournai marble tombstone of Sir William Olifard's effigy in Aberdalgie Church, which itself has been dated to circa 1365 and reads: "Hic jacet Dominus Willielmus de Olyphant, Dominus de Aberdalgy, qui obiis Quinto Die Mensis Februarir, millesimo tricentesimo vigesimo nono, Orate" which translates as "Here lies Lord William Olyphant, Lord of Aberdalgy, who died 5th February 1329." The date of 1365 is significant for raising this monument as it is the year after William's son Walter and his wife Elizabeth Bruce had been granted (or re-granted) a significant number of lands by David II. There is no evidence to date of the creation of these two lordships. Lord of Aberdalgy could be argued to denote a barony and not a lordship except that they and the title Lord Dupplin were deemed in court in 1633 as having been resigned to the Crown by the 5th or 8th Lord Oliphant and thus were all three thereby confirmed as lordships by the Crown(Duries’ Decisions, p. 685).

The first documented evidence of Lord Oliphant is in the Great Seal of Scotland (Registrum Magni Sigilli Regum Scotorum) where John Oliphant is cited as brother germain to Lord Oliphant, on 2 February 1394-5. Thereafter, the monks of Pluscarden record that in 1408, two brothers of Lord Oliphant, William and Arthur, had assisted in the murder of Sir Patrick Graham, Earl of Strathearn. Despite being second cousins of the King, these two brothers were drawn, beheaded and hanged. Walter Bower, who continued John of Fordun's chronicles is also cited to have made reference to the same incident circa 1408.

The first Lord Oliphant and his brothers John, Arthur and William were nephews of King David II of Scotland and first cousins of King Robert II of Scotland, as evidenced by their mother being described in numerous charters issued by King David II of Scotland as "beloved sister."

By 1398 only five Lordships are thought to have been created in Scotland but between 1429 and 1500 at least forty six Lordships are known to have been created and that of Laurence, Lord Oliphant reappears then. The interim lack of any mention of a Lord Oliphant can be explained by Laurence’s father having died young in a feud between the Ogilvies and the Lindsays at Arbroath in 1445 and Laurence's grandfather William, although retoured heir to his father in 1417, spending some twenty years, being most of his adult life, imprisoned in England in the Tower of London from 1424, where he either died or did so within a year of his release, which precluded either from having the opportunity to have acted politically or on record as Lord Oliphant.

The Great Seal of Scotland is regularly cited as evidence in court cases and so evidences the case that these Oliphant first cousins of the Royal Family had been made Lords at this early date.

== The Title of Lord Oliphant ==
Sir Lawrence (sic) Oliphant was acknowledged as a Lord of Parliament under King James II and the first mention of him as Lord Oliphant was in July 1455, a month after he reached his majority, indicating that he had become eligible to inherit it then, rather than that it had been created instanto. Sir Laurence sat in Parliament as a Lord of Parliament on 14 October 1467. The Dignity continued in regular succession to Laurence the fifth (or eighth) Lord Oliphant, who succeeded his grandfather, Laurence the fourth (or seventh) Lord, in 1593, his father, the Master of Oliphant, having perished at sea in 1584.

The principle of law, that a Peerage of Scotland of unknown origin shall be presumed to be limited to the heirs male of the body of the Grantee, had not been established by a decision or otherwise in the seventeenth Century; and Laurence Oliphant, 5th Lord Oliphant, having no son but having a daughter Anne who became the wife of Sir James I Douglas of Mordington, by a Procuratory of Resignation resigned his Peerage in favour of Patrick Oliphant his heir male, desiring to ensure the continuance of his Dignity in the male line of his family. However, his intended destination was not processed as would have been usual by the King and no regrant followed upon it. Lord Oliphant died before the year 1631.

There having been no regrant, his daughter claimed the Peerage of Oliphant as his heir at law. The Court of Session exercised jurisdiction on claims to Peerages before the Union, and Lady Douglas’s case came before that Court on 11 July 1633, when her claim was opposed by Patrick Oliphant. The Lords of Session found that as her father and his predecessors had held and enjoyed the Dignity, such enjoyment and use, there being no Writ to show an entail, were sufficient to transmit the Lordship title to the heirs female; but that the Procuratory of Resignation, although the King had not conferred the Honour in conformity with it, had denuded Lord Oliphant of the Peerage and had barred all claims to it. (Duries’ Decisions, p. 685.)

This was to cherry-pick the form of descent and Lord Mansfield, in the Cassillis case in 1762, and or the Sutherland case in 1771, declared the decision of the Court of Session contrary to law and justice, (Mr. Maidment’s Report of the Cassillis case, p. 51, and of the Sutherland case, p. 9,) and it has been disregarded in all the cases which have come before the House of Lords in which similar questions were raised. See below for "Notes on dignities in the peerage of Scotland which are dormant or which have been forfeited" for a review of this anachronism. The reason for the anomaly was probably political, in that Sir James Douglas (the first Lord Mordington) was brother of the powerful Earl of Angus.

The King, according to the statement of Sir John Dalrymple of Stair, subsequently one of the Lords of Session, acted upon the views expressed by the Court of Session, and determined that the heir male should hold the Peerage of Oliphant. (Dalrymple’s Collections, p. 396.)

Thus, in 1641 the King created for Sir James Douglas, the husband of Anne, the daughter and heir of Laurence Lord Oliphant, a new title of Lord Mordington (on 10 March 1640 King Charles 1 referred to the Oliphant honours as "the designation of Oliphant, Aberdalgie and Dupplin".) and, granted him the precedency due to the former Lords Oliphant. It appears from the records of Parliament that Lord Mordington sat above the Lord Oliphant. This created the title of Lord Oliphant anew and in a manner not followed at any point since in Scottish Law.

It is certain that the heir male did become Lord Oliphant (second creation) because, on 19 October 1669, Lord Rosse protested that the calling of the Lords Elphinstone, Oliphant, Lovat and Borthwick before him should not prejudice him in his right to precedency before them, and on 12 June 1672, Lord Oliphant was present in Parliament as a Lord of Parliament, and sat in the precedency of the former Lords Oliphant. Patrick Oliphant of Newtyle, (afterwards Lord Oliphant,) the heir male, was the son of John Oliphant of Newtyle, the second son of Laurence the seventh Lord Oliphant. The male issue of Patrick Lord Oliphant failed in the person of Francis the fifth (second creation) Lord Oliphant, who died without issue in 1748.

The title of Lord Oliphant was, after the death of Francis, assumed by William Oliphant of Langton, descended from Peter Oliphant, the third son of Laurence the fourth Lord Oliphant. William voted as Lord Oliphant at the election of Representative Peers without protest on 15 March 1750. However, since the second creation was "heirs male of the body" of Patrick Oliphant of Newtyle, that title had become extinct on the death of the 5th Lord (second creation.) Therefore, in peerage law, sitting at the Election of Peers and voting as Lord Oliphant was de facto a third creation of the peerage. William died without issue in 1751 and although William had a nephew senior to him in line, the Langton line became extinct in 1852.

Laurence Oliphant of Gask, descended from William Oliphant of Newton, now thought to be fourth son of Colin, Master of Oliphant himself son of the second Lord Oliphant was acknowledged, albeit incorrectly, by William, 11th Lord Oliphant as his rightful successor but Gask, having taken the part of Prince Charles Edward in the insurrection of 1745 was debarred by attainder from assuming the title although he never tried to do so even after his attainder was lifted. In fact since the Act of Union in 1707 it was no longer the right of a peer to nominate his successor in the manner thereto. On 14 July 1760 Laurence was created Lord Oliphant in the Jacobite peerage. The heir of George, second son of Colin, Master of Oliphant was the next heir to the Oliphant Peerage.

Thus, the title of Lord Oliphant was next claimed and used without challenge by David Olyphant, 6th of Bachilton in 1757. He sat and voted as Lord Oliphant at the General Election of Peers in 1761 and died at Great Pulteney Street in London on Sunday, 27 October 1770.

The title of Lord Oliphant is now dormant.

The heir male to the first Lord Oliphant and thus to all three creations of Lord Oliphant and of Lord Aberdalgie and Lord Dupplin, is Richard Eric Laurence Oliphant of that Ilk, the current Chief of Clan Oliphant.

== Lords Oliphant, (by 1394) ==
- Sir John Oliphant, Lord of Aberdalgie and Lord of Dupplin, 1st Lord Oliphant (d. 1417)
- Sir William Oliphant, Lord of Aberdalgie and Lord of Dupplin, 2nd Lord Oliphant (d. 1444)
- Sir John Oliphant, Lord of Aberdalgie and Lord of Dupplin, 3rd Lord Oliphant (d. 1445)

== Lords Oliphant, (documented through from 1455) ==
- Laurence Oliphant, known as 1st but more correctly 4th Lord Oliphant, Aberdalgie and Dupplin (d. 1498)
- John Oliphant, known as 2nd but more correctly 5th Lord Oliphant, Aberdalgie and Dupplin (d. 1516)
- Laurence Oliphant, known as 3rd but more correctly 6th Lord Oliphant, Aberdalgie and Dupplin (1505–1566)
- Laurence Oliphant, known as 4th but more correctly 7th Lord Oliphant, Aberdalgie and Dupplin (1527–1593)
- Laurence Oliphant, known as 5th but more correctly 8th Lord Oliphant, Aberdalgie and Dupplin (1583–1631)

== Lords Oliphant, second creation (1631) ==
- Patrick Oliphant, known as 6th but more correctly 9th (second creation) Lord Oliphant (d. 1680)
- Charles Oliphant, known as 7th but more correctly 10th (second creation) Lord Oliphant (d. 1709)
- Patrick Oliphant, known as 8th but more correctly 11th (second creation) Lord Oliphant (d. 1721)
- William Oliphant, known as 9th but more correctly 12th (second creation) Lord Oliphant (d. 1728)
- Francis Oliphant, known as 10th but more correctly 13th (second creation) Lord Oliphant (1715–1748)

== Lords Oliphant, third creation (1748) ==
- William Oliphant, known as 11th but more correctly 14th (third creation) Lord Oliphant (d. 1751)

== Lords Oliphant, fourth creation (1757) ==
- David Oliphant, 6th of Bachilton, known as 12th but more correctly 15th (third creation) Lord Oliphant (d. 1770)

== See also ==
- Clan Oliphant
- Oliphant (surname)
