= James Hamilton, 2nd Marquess of Hamilton =

Scottish politician

The Marquess of Hamilton
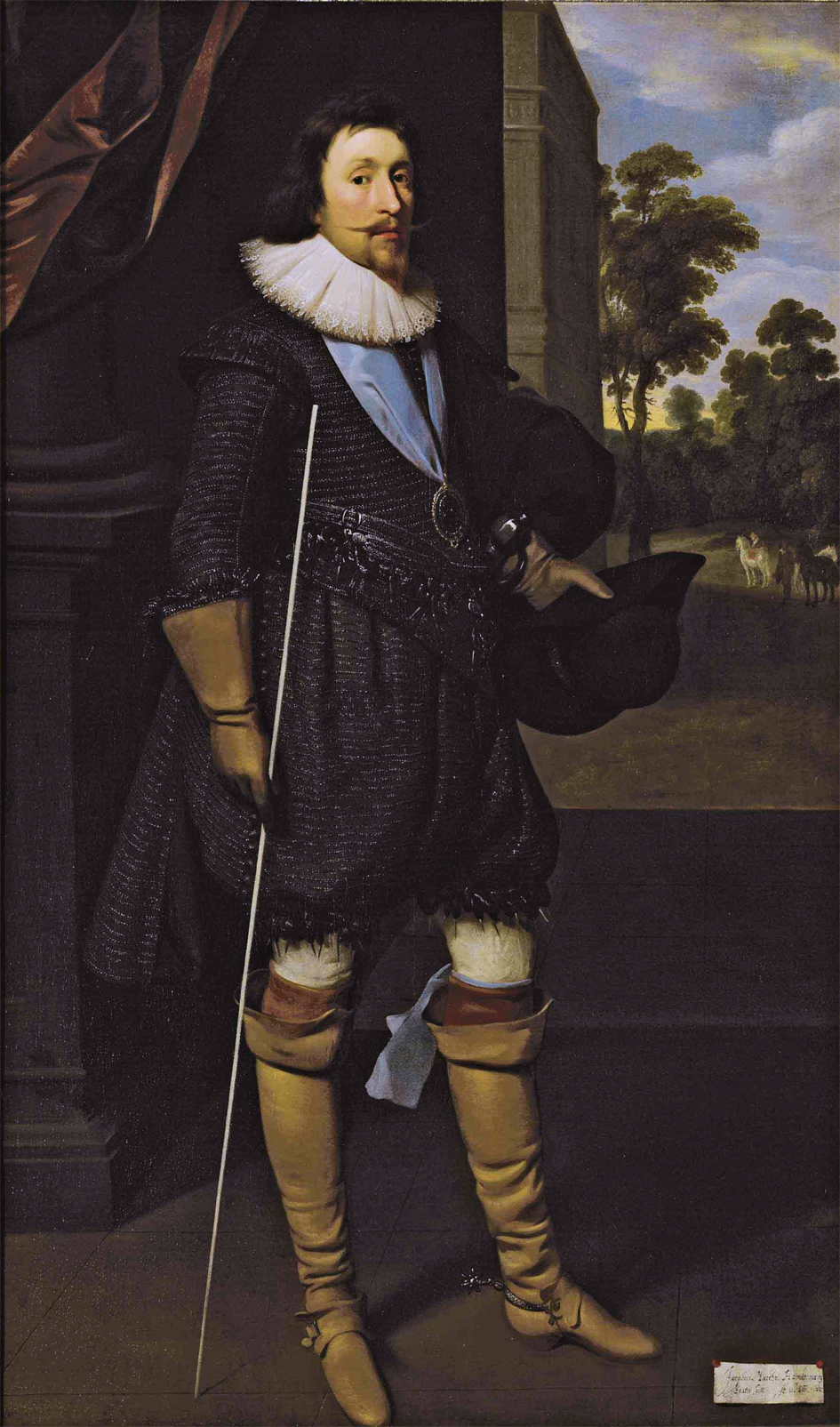
- Portrait after Daniël Mijtens, 1622
- Born: 1589
- Died: 2 March 1625 (aged 35–36); Whitehall, London
- Resting place: Hamilton
- Title: 2nd Marquess of Hamilton; 4th Earl of Arran
- Successor: James Hamilton, 1st Duke of Hamilton
- Spouse: Lady Ann Cunningham
- Children: Anne Montgomerie, Countess of Eglinton; Margaret Lindsay, Countess of Crawford; Mary Douglas, Countess of Queensberry; James Hamilton, 1st Duke of Hamilton; William Hamilton, 2nd Duke of Hamilton
- Parent(s): John Hamilton, 1st Marquess of Hamilton; Margaret Lyon

James Hamilton, 2nd Marquess of Hamilton and 4th Earl of Arran (1589 – 2 March 1625), styled Lord Aven from 1599 to 1604, was a Scottish politician.

== Career ==
He was the son of John Hamilton, 1st Marquess of Hamilton and Margaret Lyon. King James VI and the English ambassador William Ashby attended his christening at Hamilton in June 1589.

Hamilton inherited his father's titles and estates in 1604. King James granted him the property and lands of Arbroath Abbey, or "Aberbrothwick", and on 5 May 1608 created him Lord Aberbrothwick (or Arbroath). In 1609, Aberbrothwick inherited the earldom of Arran from his insane and childless uncle James Hamilton.

He moved to England with King James, and invested in the Somers Isles Company, an offshoot of the Virginia company, buying the shares of Lucy Harrington, Countess of Bedford. The Parish of Hamilton in the Somers Isles (alias Bermuda) is named for him. He was created Earl of Cambridge and Baron of Innerdale in the peerage of England on 16 June 1619. In 1621 he served as Lord High Commissioner to the Parliament of Scotland, the King's representative in the Parliament of Scotland.

== Marriage and children ==
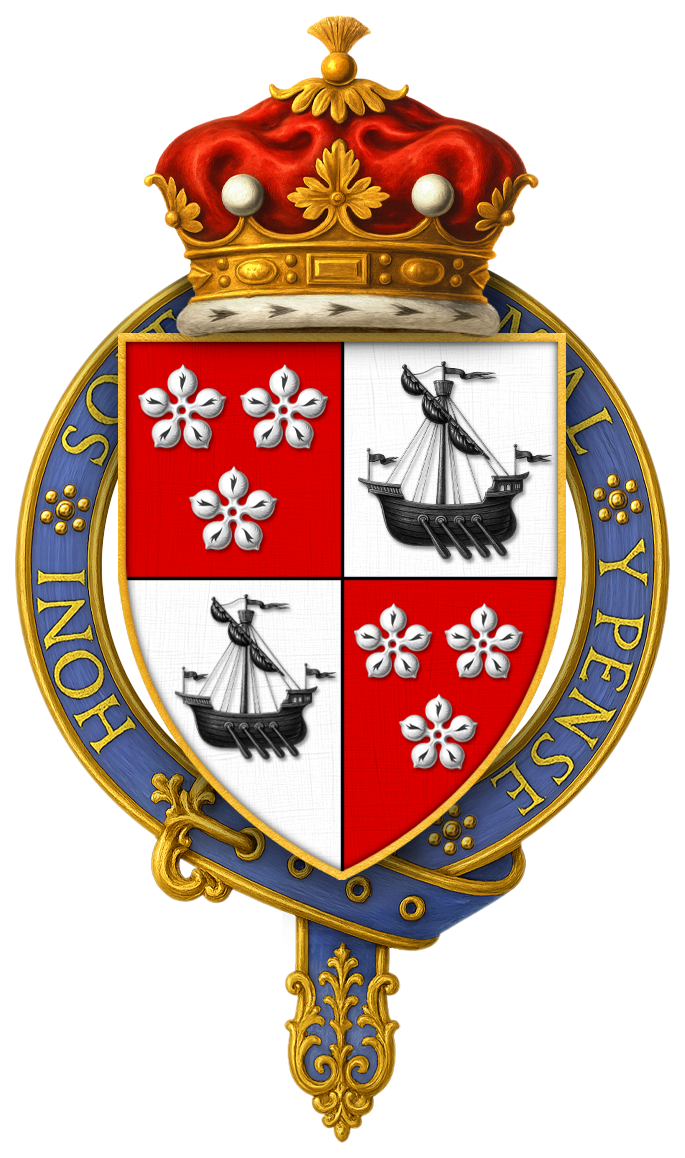
Arms of James Hamilton, 2nd Marquess of Hamilton

In 1603, he married Lady Ann Cunningham, a daughter of James Cunningham, 7th Earl of Glencairn and they had five children:

- Lady Anne Hamilton, married Hugh Montgomerie, 7th Earl of Eglinton and had issue
- Lady Margaret Hamilton, married John Lindsay, 17th Earl of Crawford, 1st Earl of Lindsay and had issue
- Lady Mary Hamilton (died 1633), married James Douglas, 2nd Earl of Queensberry, no issue
- James Hamilton, 1st Duke of Hamilton (1606–1649)
- William Hamilton, 2nd Duke of Hamilton (1616–1651)

He also had an illegitimate daughter, Margaret (who married John Hamilton, 1st Lord Belhaven and Stenton and had issue) by Anne Stewart, a daughter of Walter Stewart, 1st Lord Blantyre.

Hamilton died on 2 March 1625 at Whitehall, London, from a fever and was buried in the family mausoleum at Hamilton, on 2 September of that year.

== Ancestry ==
Ancestors of James Hamilton, 2nd Marquess of Hamilton

16. James Hamilton, 1st Lord Hamilton
8. James Hamilton, 1st Earl of Arran
17. Mary Stewart, Countess of Arran
4. James Hamilton, 2nd Earl of Arran
18. Sir David Betoun of Creich
9. Janet Bethune of Easter Wemyss
19. Janet Duddingston
2. John Hamilton, 1st Marquess of Hamilton
20. John Douglas, 2nd Earl of Morton=30
10. James Douglas, 3rd Earl of Morton
21. Janet Crichton =31
5. Lady Margaret Douglas
22. James IV of Scotland
11. Catherine Stewart
23. Marion Boyd
1. James Hamilton, 2nd Marquess of Hamilton
24. John Lyon, 4th Lord Glamis
12. John Lyon, 6th Lord Glamis
25. Elizabeth Gray
6. John Lyon, 7th Lord Glamis
26. George Douglas, Master of Angus
13. Janet Douglas, Lady Glamis
27. Elizabeth Drummond
3. Margaret Lyon
28. William Keith, 2nd Earl Marischal
14. Robert Keith, Master of Marischal
29. Lady Elizabeth Gordon
7. Janet Keith
30. John Douglas, 2nd Earl of Morton =20
15. Lady Elizabeth Douglas
31. Janet Crichton =21

== Biography ==
- Cokayne, George E. (1910). Gibbs, Vicary (ed.). The complete peerage of England, Scotland, Ireland, Great Britain and the United Kingdom, extant, extinct, or dormant. Vol. I, Ab-Adam to Basing. London: St. Catherine Press.

Parliament of Scotland
Preceded by The Earl Marischal	Lord High Commissioner; 1621	Succeeded by The Earl of Traquair (from 1639)
Court offices
Preceded by The Duke of Lennox	Lord Steward; 1623–1625	Succeeded by The Earl of Pembroke
Peerage of Scotland
Preceded by John Hamilton	Marquess of Hamilton; 1604–1625	Succeeded by James Hamilton
Preceded by James Hamilton	Earl of Arran; 1609–1625	Succeeded by James Hamilton
New creation	Lord Aberbrothwick; 1608–1625	Succeeded by James Hamilton
Peerage of England
New creation	Earl of Cambridge; 1619–1625	Succeeded by James Hamilton
