= John Hamilton, 1st Marquess of Hamilton =

Scottish marquess (1540–1604)

John Hamilton
- Marquess of Hamilton
- Tenure: 1599–1604
- Successor: James Hamilton
- Born: 1540
- Died: 26 April 1604 (aged 63–64)
- Spouse: Margaret Lyon
- Issue Detail: Edward, James, Margaret
- Father: James Hamilton, 2nd Earl of Arran
- Mother: Margaret Douglas

John Hamilton, 1st Marquess of Hamilton (1540–1604) was the founder of the long line of the marquesses and dukes of Hamilton in Scotland.

== Birth and origins ==
John was born about 1540 in Scotland. He was the third son of James Hamilton and his wife Margaret Douglas. His father was the 2nd Earl of Arran and Duke of Châtellerault in France.

Family tree

John Hamilton with wife, parents, and other selected relatives. (Note: This family tree is partly derived from the Abercorn pedigree pictured in Cokayne. Also see the lists of siblings and children in the text.)

James; 1st Earl c. 1475 – 1529	Janet; Bethune c. 1490 – c. 1522
James; 2nd Earl c. 1516 – 1575; Châtellerault	Margaret; Douglas b. c. 1510
James; 3rd Earl; 1537–1609	John; 1st Marquess; 1540–1604;	Margaret; Lyon d. 1625	Claud; 1st Lord; Paisley; 1546–1621
James; 2nd Marquess; 1589–1625	Anne; Cuninghame d. 1632	James; 1st Earl; Abercorn; 1575–1618
James; 1st Duke; 1606–1649	Margaret; Feilding c. 1590 – 1638	William; 2nd Duke; 1616–1651	Elizabeth; Maxwell c. 1620 – bef. 1659

Legend

XXX	John; Hamilton	XXX	Marquesses & dukes of Hamilton	XXX	Earls of Arran

John's mother was a daughter of James Douglas, 3rd Earl of Morton. Both parents were Scottish. They had married in September 1532. John was one of nine siblings, who are listed in his father's article.

== Early life ==
On 28 November 1547, John, still a boy, was appointed Commendator of Inchaffray Abbey, a position he held until 1551, when he was made Commendator of Arbroath instead. He had the benefit of Arbroath until 1579, although his right was disputed by George Douglas (a natural son of the Earl of Angus who would later become Bishop of Moray).

== Lord John and the exiled Queen ==
He was now known as the "Abbot of Arbroath", or "Lord John". His family supported Mary, Queen of Scots, after her imprisonment at Lochleven Castle, her abdication in favour of her one-year-old son on 24 July 1567, her defeat at Langside in 1568 and her flight to England shortly afterwards. The possibility that he might marry the exiled Queen was discussed. In October 1568, both the Duke of Norfolk and Francis Knollys, Mary's custodian at Bolton Castle, were aware that Mary entertained the idea of a marriage to Lord John. In November 1568, Mary confronted Knollys, having heard that he spread a rumour that Lord John had recently returned to Scotland from France and was raising an armed force to rescue her.

Mary addressed a letter to John Hamilton and her supporters in Scotland on 9 December 1568 describing the events of the conference at York, where her status was discussed. She warned that Dumbarton Castle would be besieged, that Elizabeth I would support her half-brother James Stewart, 1st Earl of Moray. Mary claimed that Elizabeth had promised to her that Moray would not be allowed in presence, and had broken other agreements regarding the conference and the commissioners. Queen Elizabeth responded to the claims in Mary's letter by denying them in a proclamation on 22 January 1569, and writing to the Earl and Countess of Mar who kept James VI at Stirling Castle.

In January 1570, the Earl of Moray, who ruled Scotland as regent during part of the minority of King James VI, was assassinated by John Hamilton of Bothwellhaugh, a supporter of Queen Mary, at Linlithgow. John's father (the Duke of Châtellerault and 2nd Earl of Arran) had been imprisoned by Murray at the time and John himself might have had a hand in the murder. His successor, Regent Lennox, died in 1571 from a shot in his back during a skirmish at Stirling with the Queen's party. Finally, on 23 February 1573, Hamilton's father gave up his support for Mary and recognised Mary's infant son James as King of Scotland.

== Head of the family ==
His father died at Hamilton on 22 January 1575. His older brother James succeeded as the 3rd Earl of Arran, but because of his insanity, he was placed under John's care making John the de facto Earl and head of the family.

In November 1575, John and his brother Claud took part in a horse race against English borderers at Solway sands.

== Marriage and children ==
On 30 December 1577 John contracted to marry Margaret Lyon, Countess of Cassilis, the widow of Gilbert Kennedy, 4th Earl of Cassilis, and daughter of John Lyon, 7th Lord Glamis, promising to marry her before 10 February 1578. His wife was a staunch Protestant. She had converted her first husband who had been a Catholic before their marriage.

John and Margaret had three children:

- Edward, who died in infancy
- James (1589–1625), The ambassador William Ashby was a godparent at his christening. He succeeded as the 2nd Marquess of Hamilton
- Margaret, who married John Maxwell, 9th Lord Maxwell There were great preparations at Hamilton Palace and rich apparel bought in Edinburgh for the wedding in September 1597.

Hamilton also had two illegitimate children:

- Margaret Hamilton, who married Sir Humphrey Colquhoun of Luss
- Sir John Hamilton of Letterick, from whom descended the Lords Bargany

== Forfeiture and English Exile ==
In 1579 James Douglas, 4th Earl of Morton accused John and his younger brother Claud to have been implicated in the murders of the regents Moray and Lennox and obtained that John and Claud were included in the Scottish Act of forfeiture of 1579. In consequence John lost his income from the abbey of Arbroath and had to leave the country. He fled first to England, then to France. He returned to England and there stayed with his brother Claud in the North. While in England he reconciled himself with Archibald Douglas, 8th Earl of Angus who was also in exile there due to his association with the Raid of Ruthven. King James had by now come under the influence of James Stewart of Bothwellmuir, to whom the King had granted Hamilton's brother's earldom of Arran.

== Back in Scotland ==
With the connivance of Elizabeth I, John Hamilton, with the Earls of Angus and Mar, and the Master of Glamis, raised an army and entered Scotland, reaching Stirling in October 1585. James Stewart of Bothwellmuir fled and King James capitulated on 4 November, receiving the banished lords into his presence.

At a parliament convened at Linlithgow on 1 December 1585, King James rescinded Hamilton's forfeiture and restored him and the other lords to their previously held lands. Further Hamilton was raised to the Privy Council and made captain of Dumbarton Castle. According to David Hume of Godscroft, the Earl of Angus and Hamilton argued over precedence in the king's privy or outer chamber at Holyrood Palace. James VI came out of his bed chamber and made them reconcile by drinking and joining hands.

James VI sailed to Norway in October 1589 and made Hamilton in charge of the three border wards of Scotland. Elizabeth approved of his appointment. In April 1590 he visited Dalkeith Palace and when the gardener tried to stop him taking a horse, Hamilton's servant shot him. Hamilton bore the sceptre at the coronation of Anne of Denmark in St Giles, Edinburgh.

On 1 July 1592 Lord John Hamilton captured Archibald Wauchope of Niddrie with other rebel followers of the Earl of Bothwell at the meadow of Lesmahagow and imprisoned them in Craignethan Castle, promising their lives would be spared. James VI sent Sir John Carmichael, captain of the royal guard, to collect the prisoners, but one of Hamilton's sons released them.

In 1588 John founded a grammar school that became known as Hamilton Academy. In 1972 this school became the Hamilton Grammar School.

In the 1590s, John became embroiled with James VI's cousin and favourite Ludovic Stuart, 2nd Duke of Lennox, in a struggle over Dumbarton Castle. Although James had earlier made Hamilton captain of the castle 'for life', it was an office which Lennox coveted and he lobbied the king hard for it. After protracted resistance, Hamilton was finally obliged to relinquish Dumbarton Castle to Lennox in January 1598.

== Marquess ==
Hamilton continued to rise in the King's favour, and on 15 April 1599, following the baptism of Princess Margaret at Holyroodhouse, he was created Marquess of Hamilton, Earl of Arran and Lord Aven. In August 1602 he hosted the French ambassador, the Baron de Tour at Hamilton Palace, who hunted with the king and the Duke of Lennox and played a card game called "mawe".

== Death ==
The Marquess died on 12 April 1604. He was succeeded by his son James as the 2nd Marquess of Hamilton. James also succeeded as the 4th Earl of Arran in 1609 upon his elder brother's death.

Timeline
Age	Date	Event
0	1540	Born, probably in Hamilton, Lanarkshire, Scotland.
1–2	1542, 14 Dec	Accession of Queen Mary, succeeding King James V
6–7	1547, 28 Nov	Made Commendator of Inchaffray Abbey while still a boy.
10–11	1551, 4 Sep	Made Commendator of Arbroath instead.
26–27	1567, 24 Jul	Accession of King James VI, succeeding Queen Mary
27–28	1568, 13 May	Mary lost the Battle of Langside and flees to England.
29–30	1570, 23 Jan	Probably involved in the murder of the Regent Moray.
30–31	1571, 4 Sep	Regent Lennox killed.
34–35	1575, 22 Jan	Became de facto earl when his insane brother succeeded as de jure 3rd Earl of Arran.
37–38	1578, Jan or Feb	Married Margaret Lyon.
38–39	1579	Forfeited (together with Claud).
41–42	1582, Aug	Raid of Ruthven
44–45	1585, 4 Nov	Welcomed back by the King at Stirling.
46–47	1587, 8 Feb	Mary, Queen of Scots executed at Fotheringhay Castle, England.
58–59	1599, 15 Apr	Created Marquess of Hamilton.
62–63	1603, 24 Mar	Accession of King James I, succeeding Queen Elizabeth I
63–64	1604, 12 Apr	Died.

== Notes and references ==
=== Sources ===
- Cokayne, George Edward (1892). Complete Peerage of England, Scotland, Ireland, Great Britain and the United Kingdom, Extant, Extinct, or Dormant. Vol. IV (1st ed.). London: George Bell and Sons. OCLC 1180828941. – G to K (for Hamilton)
- Cokayne, George Edward (1910). Gibbs, Vicary (ed.). The complete peerage of England, Scotland, Ireland, Great Britain and the United Kingdom, extant, extinct, or dormant. Vol. I (2nd ed.). London: St Catherine Press. OCLC 228661424. – Ab-Adam to Basing (for Arran)
- Debrett, John (1828). Peerage of the United Kingdom of Great Britain and Ireland. Vol. II (17th ed.). London: F. C. and J. Rivington. OCLC 54499602. – Scotland and Ireland
- Dunlop, Robert (1890). "Hamilton, James, second Earl of Arran and Duke of Châtelherault (d. 1575)". In Lee, Sidney (ed.). Dictionary of National Biography. Vol. XXIV. New York: MacMillan and Co. pp. 167–170. OCLC 8544105.
- Fraser, Antonia (1970) [1st pub. 1969]. Mary Queen of Scots. London: Panther Books. OCLC 469449102.
- Fraser, William (1887). Historical Manuscript Commission 11th Report Appendix Part 6 Manuscripts of the Duke of Hamilton K.T. London: Eyre & Spottiswoode.
- Fryde, Edmund Boleslaw; Greenway, D. E.; Porter, S.; Roy, I., eds. (1986). Handbook of British Chronology. Royal Historical Society Guides and Handbooks, No. 2 (3rd ed.). London: Offices of the Royal Historical Society. ISBN 0-86193-106-8. – (for timeline)
- Groome, Francis Hindes (1892). "Kennedy, Gilbert, fourth Earl of Cassillis". In Lee, Sidney (ed.). Dictionary of National Biography. Vol. XXX. New York: MacMillan and Co. pp. 419–420. OCLC 8544105. (for his wife's first husband)
- Henderson, Thomas Finlayson (1890a). "Hamilton, James, third Earl of Arran (1530–1609)". In Lee, Sidney (ed.). Dictionary of National Biography. Vol. XXIV. New York: MacMillan and Co. pp. 173–176. OCLC 8544105.
- Henderson, Thomas Finlayson (1890b). "Hamilton, John, first Marquis of Hamilton (1532–1604)". In Lee, Sidney (ed.). Dictionary of National Biography. Vol. XXIV. New York: MacMillan and Co. pp. 192–195. OCLC 8544105.
- Henderson, Thomas Finlayson (1898). "Stewart, James of Bothwellmuir". In Lee, Sidney (ed.). Dictionary of National Biography. Vol. LIV. London: Smith, Elder, & Co. pp. 308–311. OCLC 8544105.
- Marshall, Rosalind K. (2004). "Hamilton, John, first marquess of Hamilton (1539/40–1604)". In Matthew, Colin; Harrison, Brian (eds.). Oxford Dictionary of National Biography. Vol. 24. New York: Oxford University Press. pp. 864–867. ISBN 0-19-861374-1.
- Paul, Sir James Balfour (1907). The Scots Peerage, Founded on Wood's Edition of Sir Robert Douglas's Peerage of Scotland. Vol. IV. Edinburgh: David Douglas. OCLC 505064285. – Fife to Hyndford (for Hamilton)

Peerage of Scotland
New creation	Marquess of Hamilton; 1599–1604	Succeeded by James Hamilton
