= Anna Hume =

Scottish translator, poet and writer

Anna Hume (floruit 1644) was a Scottish translator, poet and writer.

Hume was the daughter of Jacobean poet and historian David Hume of Godscroft and Barbara Johnstoun of Elphinstone. She superintended the posthumous publication of her father's History of the House and Race of Douglas and Angus, published The Triumphs of Love, Chastitie, Death: translated out of Petrarch by Mrs. Anna Hume, and is also said to have translated many of her father's Latin poems.

Controversy surrounded her publication of History of the House and Race of Douglas and Angus, as William Douglas, 11th Earl of Angus, and first marquis of Douglas, was dissatisfied with Hume's work. Douglas consulted Drummond of Hawthornden, who admitted various defects and extravagant views in Hume. Hawthornden, however, did not fight to stop the publication of the work, as be believed that the suppression of the book would ruin the gentlewoman, 'who hath ventured, she says, her whole fortune' on its publication. Drummond of Hawthornden, after observing Anna Hume's commendatory verses, declared himself unworthy of 'the blazon of so pregnant and rare a wit.'

== Family ==
Anna Hume's father, Hume of Godscroft, was a Scottish historian, poet and political figure. Her grandfather David Hume of Wedderburn fought in many wars in Scotland, and was present at battle of Ancrum Moor in 1545 and the battle of Pinkie in 1547. He was captured at Dalkeith Castle by the English in 1548 and remained a prisoner for two years until a ransom was paid. He also sided with Mary, Queen of Scots at Carberry Hill. His first wife was Barbara Johnstone, and his second wife, Anna Hume's mother, was Mariota Johnstone, known as "The Good Lady Wedderburn" for her charity work and good influence on the community. Not much is known about Anna Hume's ancestors on her mother's side.

Anna Hume's great-grandfather, David Hume was also an active soldier, who was present at the Battle of Flodden in 1513, where his father and elder brother were killed by the English. David Hume also led a clan against the Duke of Albany in the border wars. He is known for cutting off the head of the French Warden Antoine d'Arces de la Bastle in 1517, after he was killed by John and Partick Hume. He married Alison Douglas, daughter of George Douglas, Master of Angus.

== Life ==
Little is known about the life of Anna Hume. Her birth date and date of death are unknown. She is presumed to have lived from the late 16th to the mid- to late 17th century. She came from a titled family, and was born and raised in Wedderburn Castle in Scotland.

== Works ==
Anna Hume is believed to have translated most, if not all, of her father's Latin poems. One of the greatest admirers of Hume's works was Drummond of Hawthornden. Among Drummond's correspondence is one letter addressed "To the Learned and Worthy Gentlewoman, Mrs. Anna Hume, daughter to Mr. David Hume of Godscroft," from which it appears that she had expressed her especial admiration of Drummond in some complimentary verses. "Worthy Madam," says Drummond in acknowledgment,

"I should be too ambitious, I will not say arrogant, if I thought that honour which you give me in your delicate verses to be due to the honoured, and not rather to the honourer. They reflect and turn back unto yourself, as to a more renowned wonder, that praise by desert which ye bestow upon me of your mere courtesy. Alas! my muses are of no such value to deserve the blazon of so pregnant and rare a wit."

=== History of Douglas and Angus ===
After her father's death, Anna Hume was instrumental in getting an edition of his History of the Houses of Douglas and Angus into print in 1644. In honour of her father's memory and because of the potential value of the book, Hume did all that she could in her power to ensure its publication. She had it printed in Edinburgh by Evan Tyler, printer to the king, in the form of a quarto volume of 440 pages. She also proposed to dedicate the volume to the Marquis of Douglas, and believing it proper that his Lordship should see a book regarding his family, she had sent him an early copy, with a request for his permission. The work told the story down to the death of the good Earl Archibald, 8th Earl of Angus.

Controversy surrounded her publication of History of the House and Race of Douglas and Angus, as William Douglas, 11th Earl of Angus, and first marquis of Douglas, was dissatisfied with Hume's work, which he believed exhibited various defects and extravagant views: "By confession, Hume had infused his own political opinions and criticisms into his narrative, had not slurred over the rebellions of some of the Douglases, and their conflicts with the Crown, but, on the contrary, had been frank in his commendations at such points, and his explications of the principle of popular liberty as opposed to kingly power."

Historians speculate that Douglas had his own father's History of the Douglases, which he may have been editing by himself with intentions to publish it. After having taken some steps to stop or delay the publication of Hume's book, the Marquis had consulted Drummond of Hawthornden. He had sent Drummond a printed copy of the yet unpublished book, followed by a letter stating his difficulties and the reasons. He requested Drummond, if it were possible, to pay him a visit at Douglas Castle to advise him on what actions are suitable under these circumstances. William Drummond wrote "To the Right Honourable, His Very Good Lord, the Marquis of Douglas":

My Noble Lord,—
A letter by an obscurer hand and a meaner carrier, bearing your Lordship's name, had power to draw me upon a longer journey, and to a more difficile task than the reading of books in your Lordship's castle; and shall at all occasions: but the disorders of these times, and imminent troubles about the place where now I live, shall excuse for a season my not seeing your Lordship, and plead forgiveness. Les Pilieres ou Pilleures de la Republique cut to the gentlemen hereabouts so much work that none can be many days absent from his own dwelling place, especially those whose brains are not fully mellow with their new potions.
Some days before your Lordship's letter came, I received from the Laird of Gaggy a copy of the history of your Lordship's progenitors in print [Godscroft's book], which I have not yet thoroughly perused. What I have observed on it your Lordship will find on a sheet apart.——This book by these times will be much made of; and above the whole the last part of it, where are discourses which authorise rebellion, and the forcing of consciences, and putting the sword in the people's hand. In a little time more, if our princes shall re-obtain their authority, it may be challenged. Meanwhile, it will be no prejudice nor disgrace to your Lordship's house if by the present rulers of the State the books be suffered to come forth, your Lordship having used the ordinary means to suppress and call them in. The worst which can happen is to put forth a new edition of them, in which your Lordship may cause take away what is faulty, and adjoin what is wanting, with an Apologetical Preface for what was first passed or then came to light.——Your new book [the Marquis's intended edition of his father's history] would bear no author's name, save that it is collected and taken off the original and ancient records of your Lordship's house.——If this book be of equal bigness with Mr. D. Hume's book, the two books cannot be seriously matched and conferred together (as they must be) in one whole month, yea, perhaps two; which time, to my regret, I cannot now have to attend your Lordship at the Castle of Douglas. But, if it would please your Lordship by the hand of your Lordship's son, or Gaggy, to hazard your Lordship's book to be brought to Edinburgh and delivered to me, I shall omit no time in paralleling the two books; and, being nearer many histories in divers languages in mine own study, I can more conveniently peruse them than in your Lordship's castle, where I will be but like an artisan without tools.
I would request your Lordship to be assured that there shall be nothing within the compass of my endeavours wherein I shall be deficient; and shall remain most willing

Ever to serve your Lordship,

[W. Drummond.]

=== Triumphs ===
Anna Hume also translated the first three of Petrarch's Trionfi ("Triumphs"). In 1644, Evan Tyler, the king's printer, published Hume's poetry, The Triumphs of Love, Chastitie, Death: Translated Out of Petrarch by Mrs. Anna Hume. Historians believe that the publication of her father's book influenced Hume's decision to have her own poetry printed, as it enabled her to form the connection with a printer. Her decision to publish was relatively unusual for the time, as ladies of prominent families were not often expected to think of professional authorship as a career.

The three poems are entitled the "Triumph of Love," "Triumph of Death," and "Triumph of Chastity." The volume prints her translation of Petrarch's The Triumphs of Love- a series of six poems celebrating Petrarch's purported devotion to Laura. The poems tell of Love's triumph over the poet (Petrarch falls in love with Laura), superseded by the triumph of chastity over lust (in that Laura does not yield to Petrarch's love), which is followed by the triumph of death over Laura (as Laura dies and reminds both author and reader of death's power).

Hume's address to the reader, found at the beginning of the work, is as follows:

To The Reader.

Reader, I have oft been told,
Verse that speak not Love are cold.
I would gladly please thine ear,
But am loth to buy't too dear.
And 'tis easier far to borrow
Lovers' tears than feel their sorrow.
Therefore he hath funisht me
Who had enough to serve all three.

Throughout the poems, Hume writes in rhyming couplets, "but each rhymed pair does not represent an individual thought; rather, her sentences bridge several couplets, and a given line of poetry usually begins mid-clause." The following lines from "The Triumph of Death" show Hume's specific style of writing:

The glorious Maid, whose soul to Heaven is gone
And left the rest cold earth, she who was grown
A pillar of true valor, and had gain'd
Much honour by her victory, and chain'd
That God which doth the world with terror bind,
Using no armour but her own chaste mind.

The translation is, on the whole, was considered to be faithful and spirited, and was widely well received. The second half of the Triumph of Love, Part iii., descriptive of the disappointed lover, and the bright account of the fair maids in the 'Triumph of Chastitie,' was admirably rendered. A copy of this work can be found in the British Museum.

Noella Pousada-Lobiera suggests that in both the translation itself and her prefaratory poems and annotations Hume rewrites Petrach's tales of tragic love as patriarchal violence.
