= James Hume (mathematician) =

Scottish mathematician

James Hume (fl. 1639) was a Scottish mathematician. He is given credit for introducing the modern exponential notation, along with René Descartes.

== Life ==
The son of David Hume of Godscroft, sometimes therefore called described as "Scotus Theagrius", James Hume lived in France. Theagrius was a pen-name used by his father, and has been thought a macaronic form of "Godscroft".

== Works ==
Hume published a Hebrew grammar in Hamburg, in 1624. On the title-page of his Pantaleonis Vaticinia Satyra, dated Rouen, 1633, Hume is called "Med. Doctor". The Satyra is a Latin romance, imitating John Barclay's Argenis. It is an "elegant neo-classic satire" influenced by Petronius; but is crude. It is dedicated to Robert Kerr, 1st Earl of Ancram, and has an historical appendix on contemporary affairs, mostly German. In 1634 Hume printed in Latin Prœlium ad Lipsiam, Gustavus Magnus, De Reditu Ducis Aureliensis ex Flandria, as an appendix to his father's De Unione Insulæ Britanniæ (Paris). Some Latin verses in the same book accuse Morinus of plagiarism for having used some proofs of theorems given by Hume to John Napier.

In 1636 Hume published at Paris Algèbre de Viète d'une Méthode nouuelle, claire et facile, and Traité de la Trigonométric pour resoudre tous Triangles rectilignes et sphériques. At the end of the latter appears a list of nine mathematical works which Hume had written in Latin. There are also two non-mathematical works, De Horologiis and Grammatica Hebræa. A translation of one of his works into French, apparently his De Arte muniendi more Gallico, appeared under the title Fortifications Françaises d'une Méthode facile.

== See also ==
- Exponentiation (History of the notation)

== Notes ==
Attribution

This article incorporates text from a publication now in the public domain: Lee, Sidney, ed. (1891). "Hume, James (fl.1639)". Dictionary of National Biography. Vol. 28. London: Smith, Elder & Co.
