= Jacobean debate on the Union =

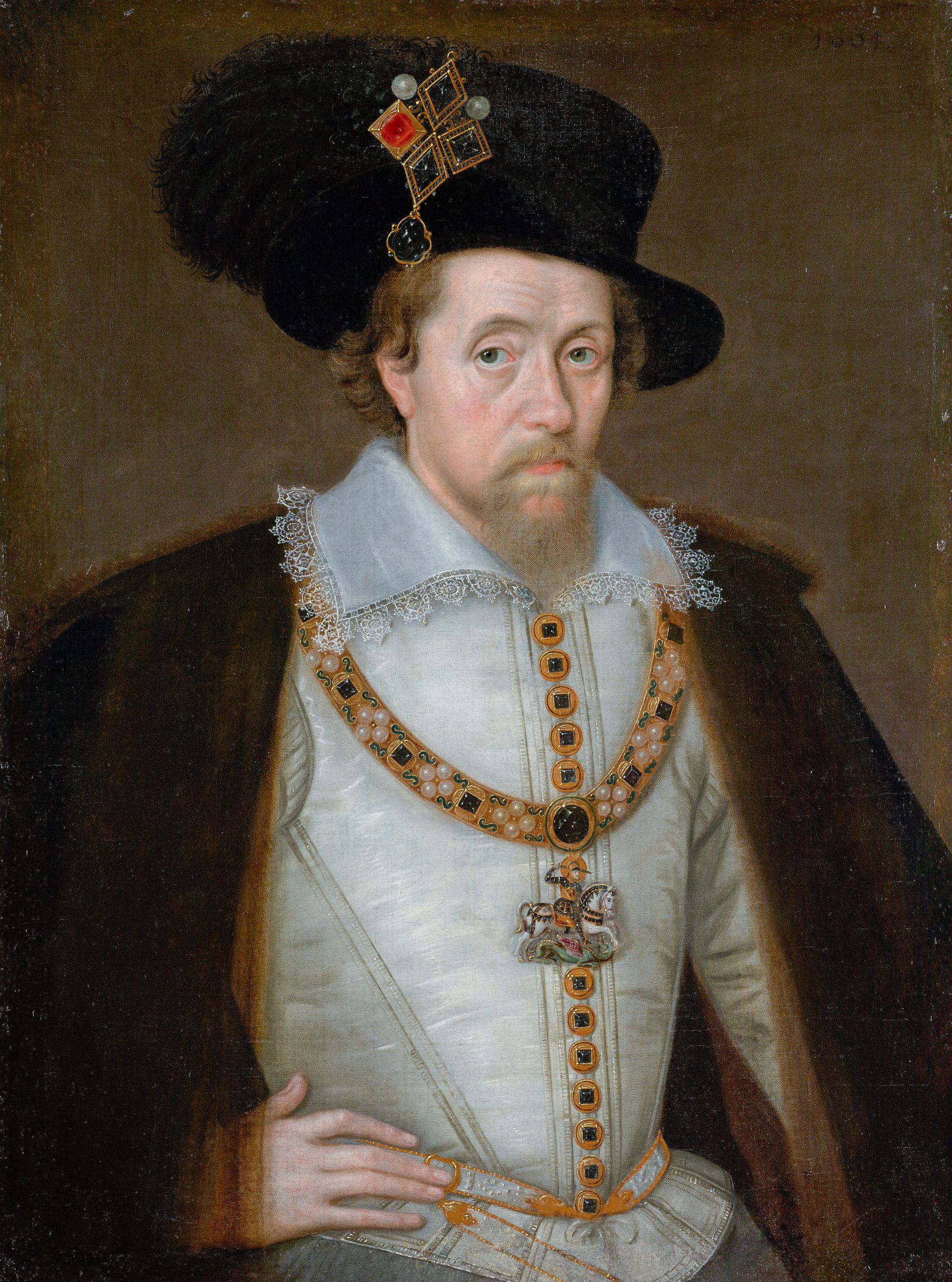
James I and VI, 1604 portrait by John de Critz the Elder, wearing the "Mirror of Great Britain" jewel in his hat. James pawned the jewel in 1625.

The Jacobean debate on the Union took place in the early years of the reign of James I of England, who came to the English throne in 1603 as James VI of Scotland, and was interested in uniting his Kingdoms of England (including Wales) and Scotland. With one monarch on the two thrones there was a personal union; since James was very widely accepted in England, the debate was not on that plane. A political union with a common Parliament (called “statutory union” at the time), was supported by James, but proved too difficult at the time. Political union did not in fact come about until 1653 during the Commonwealth, and more permanently with the Union of England and Scotland in 1707.

While the "Union of the Crowns" represented by James on his accession in England was essentially undisputed, the further political union, thought of as "Union of the Kingdoms" or "statutory union", was resisted. Legislation was produced in both England and Scotland, which engendered caustic parliamentary debate from 1604 to 1607, but it was limited in scope, mainly removing hostile laws. While jurists and religious figures supported a deeper union, the envisaged process stalled, and incompatibilities of the English and Scottish societies became more apparent.

== Background ==
In 1502 James IV of Scotland agreed a Treaty of Perpetual Peace with Henry VII of England and, in accordance, married Henry's eldest daughter, Margaret Tudor, in 1503. The wedding, celebrated by William Dunbar's poem The Thrissil and the Rois, brought the Stuarts into England's Tudor line of succession. When Henry VIII of England declared war on France in 1513, James invaded England to honour the Auld Alliance, and died at the Battle of Flodden. There were further Anglo-Scottish Wars. The union of England and Scotland was anticipated by the Treaty of Greenwich of 1543, under which Mary, Queen of Scots was to marry the future Edward VI of England. This dynastic union did not take place, despite The Rough Wooing; but it produced a pro-union literature, notably in works written by the Scots John Elder and James Henrisoun, and the Englishmen William Patten and Protector Somerset. The idea was revived in the early years of the reign of Elizabeth I, with the project of her marriage to James Hamilton, 3rd Earl of Arran, heir presumptive to the Scottish crown.

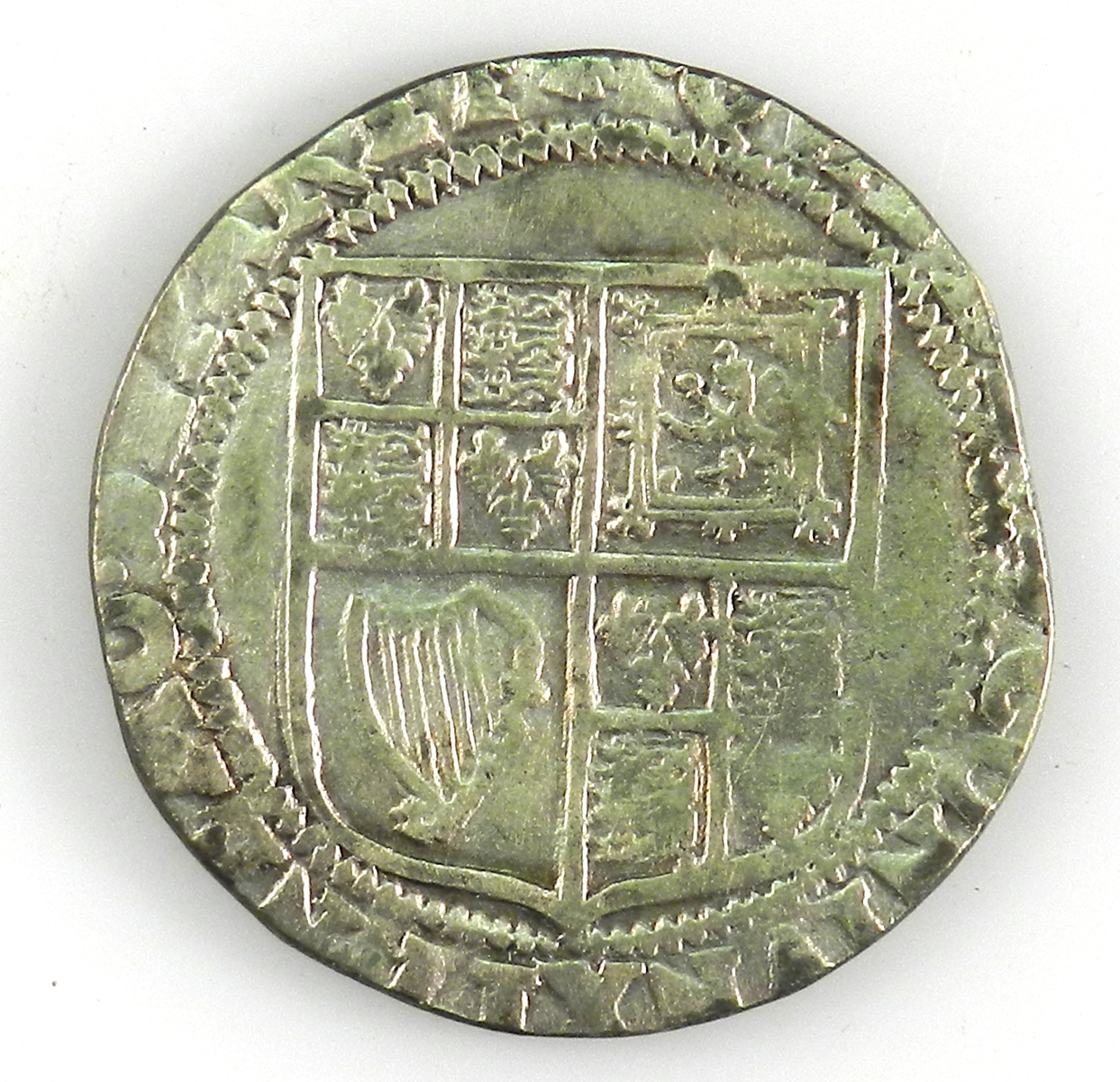
Shilling coin of James I (counterfeit copy), reverse with coat of arms

The claim of James VI to the English throne was also bound up with the Tudor dynasty, coming (despite provisions in the will of Henry VIII) through his great-grandmothers Margaret Tudor and Mary Tudor. He had two new official signet rings made, combining the arms of England and Scotland. A Latin slogan used on his coins, Henricus rosas regna Jacobus, pointed up a comparison with Henry VII: it implied that Henry's role in uniting the competing houses (see Tudor rose) had been followed by James's in uniting the kingdoms.

== Underlying issues ==
The Scots were long allied to France (the "Auld Alliance"), and had long been opponents of England, often to the point of war. Christophe de Harlay, comte de Beaumont, French ambassador in England, saw the proposed closer union as against France's interests, representing both a gain for England and the loss of a traditional ally; and more so when James brought the Anglo-Spanish War to an end in 1604. Beaumont cultivated good relations with a small group of prominent Scottish nobles who were committed to the French alliance. The Union had, however, brought to Scotland some commercial advantages, and privileges for naturalisation. Henry Savile and others analysed the union in terms of its security threat.

The political systems of the two countries, despite high-level similarities of structure, functioned quite differently in practice. The councils and parliaments functioned in different ways; moreover, the Scottish system had been in flux for some time, while the English one was well-established. Scotland had a reputation for prolonged internal instability, a point brought up in the English parliament by the xenophobic Christopher Pigott in 1607.

A full commercial and customs union was seen as against English interests; and Savile mentioned that Scotland would retain trading advantages with France. The Scottish economy was less well developed, its merchant ships smaller, and the existing trade between the two countries was not very extensive. Free trade, it was argued, would mostly benefit the Scots.

In religious terms, it was clear that full union would cement a Protestant alliance. This was a powerful argument in its favour, though the churches of England and Scotland were neither theologically nor organizationally identical, and there was no easy path to integration . There was a tension noticed at the time, between declaring the points of difference adiaphora, and advocating for religious uniformity. In this context, Robert Pont pointed up the use of the term Puritan as pejorative in England.

== Supporters ==
Supporters called for deeper integration than the personal union under James, supporting the creation of a unified Parliament, armed forces, home market. They consisted of various groups: the "court party" in politics, for whom Francis Bacon was the leading spokesman, with allied courtiers; publicists; jurists; and interpreters of prophetic and apocalyptic writings.

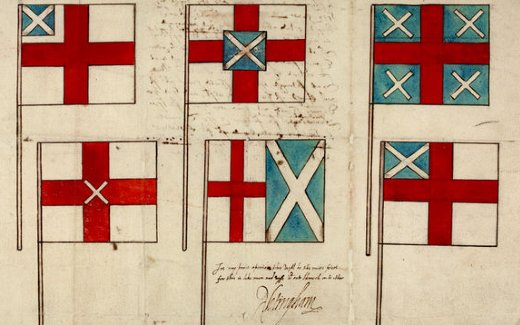
Proposed designs for a union flag, with the lower central one approved by Charles Howard, 1st Earl of Nottingham. About 1604.

=== Court advocates ===
Francis Bacon consistently advocated a fuller union of the kingdoms, both as a journalist and as an MP. He took it that the Anglo-Scottish union offered a chance for "greatness" of the unified kingdom.

Among courtiers, James Colville, 1st Lord Colville of Culross was an important Unionist. Calvin's case, the leading legal test of nationality law after the 1603 union of the crowns, was at least notionally concerned with the legal rights of Colville's young grandson James.

=== Publicists ===
Most of the pamphlet literature on the proposed union was produced in the period May to October 1604. Those advocating in print in favour of the union in 1604 included William Cornwallis (The Miraculous and Happy Union between England and Scotland), and John Gordon in his Enotikon Or a Sermon of the Vnion of Great Brittannie. John Thornborough, bishop of Bristol, published A Discourse plainly proving the evident Utility and urgent Necessity of the desired happy Union of England and Scotland (1604); the House of Commons believed the work reflected badly on their proceedings, and reprimanded him. Thornborough then followed with a longer work, Joiefull and Blessed Reuniting. Edward Forsett's A Comparative Discourse of the Bodies Natural and Politique (1606), on the theory of the King's Two Bodies, also advocated for the union.

=== Jurists ===
The English civilian John Cowell wrote Institutiones juris Anglicani (1605), on the perceived obstacle to full union, the common law. He proposed an integration of English and Scottish law on the basis of greater conformity of the common law to civil law. The legal writings of Sir Thomas Craig, in Jus feudale and other works, addressed related questions, but from a Scottish perspective, and with emphasis on the common origins of the Scottish and English legal systems in feudal law. Craig has been seen as an advocate of union; but his works are more complex than that assessment would suggest, and had a lasting influence on jurists both sides of the border. Craig adopted the same line as John Mair had done in the early 16th century, in favour of a "union of equals". He particularly detested the "Description of Britain" of William Harrison, prefaced to the Holinshed's Chronicles, which made a claim of English lordship, and slurred the ancient Scots.

The Bristol lawyer George Saltern invoked ideas on the ancient constitution, in his Of the Ancient Lawes of Great Britaine, claiming that the old British laws went back to King Lucius of Britain. Scottish lawyer John Russell (c.1550–1612) wrote and circulated a long manuscript work Treatise of the Happie and Blissed Unioun.

=== Prophetic interpreters ===
The union of the crowns fed into a tradition of prophetic interpretation of political events, both secular (going back to the Prophetiae Merlini) and biblical. The Whole Prophesie of Scotland of 1603 treated Merlin's prophecies as authoritative. James Maxwell, a student of prophecy who put it to political use in the reign of King James, distinguished between the Welsh and "Caledonian" Merlins. Union was defended in particular by John Lewis of Llynwene, in a multi-book The History of Great Britain, not published until the 18th century when Hugh Thomas edited it from a manuscript, but circulated with the King's approval; it drew on Richard White of Basingstoke as well as traditional sources.

Sir William Alexander, writing in praise of King James, invoked the prophetic tradition and dated it to 300 years before the King's birth (the mid-13th century). That timing tied it to the Scottish writer, Thomas the Rhymer. The use of "Great Britain" as a title of the kingdom as united by James was considered to reference Brutus of Troy, of the Anglo-Welsh traditional foundation myth. A mythological consonance was seen by some at the time between what were different traditions. Alexander looked ahead, to Henry Frederick, Prince of Wales and a crusading, imperial Britain. On the other hand, the "British history" was then already under strong attack, for example by William Camden. The visionary views of Alexander, Gordon and Maxwell were unrepresentative of Scottish opinion in general, which was more in tune with Craig.

In other ways the prophetic interpretation ran into incompatibilities, which were quite marked in apocalyptic thinking. In particular John Foxe's apocalyptic thought clashed seriously with that of John Napier. The Presbyterians of the Church of Scotland could accept the value of a unified Protestant kingdom but not the idea of the privilege of the Church of England as elected, which was Foxe's influential claim.

Scottish criticism of Foxe came to play a role in breaking down the orthodoxy in England on apocalyptic thought. Thomas Brightman began a process of decoupling "imperial" and "apocalyptic" themes of the end times, in the Anglican context where Foxe had linked them strongly.

== Union in Parliament ==
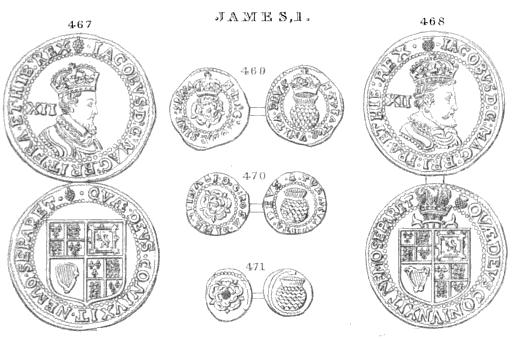
Jacobean coinage, showing the Latin union slogans Quæ Deo conjuxit nemo separet and Tueatur unita Deus. A currency union was put into place by proclamations of 1603 and 1604, with an exchange rate of 12 Pound Scots to 1 Pound sterling. These Latin inscriptions were suggested by King James.

Formally the business of moving to a closer union was given to a commission; its English membership included Sir George Carew the diplomat, and Sir Henry Hobart the lawyer. Comprising a large group of 39 from the English side, it put forth a prospective treaty for incorporating union on 6 December 1604. Substantive work on the affairs of the border counties was done by a committee of the union commission from late 1604, by English and Scottish lawyers: Francis Bacon, John Bennett, Daniel Dunne, Sir John Herbert, Sir Thomas Hesketh, Sir Henry Hobart (Hubbard) and Lawrence Tanfield, acting with Thomas Craig, Sir Thomas Hamilton, John Shairp of Houston and John Skene.

From this point onwards the proposed union ran into substantial parliamentary opposition in the House of Commons. It was orchestrated by Henry Wriothesley, 3rd Earl of Southampton through Sir Maurice Berkeley, Sir Herbert Croft, Sir Henry Neville, and Sir Edwin Sandys.

Particularly the target of parliamentary tactics by Sandys, the bill to ratify the proposed treaty was bogged down for over two years, and in mid-1607 the Parliament of England passed only a much mutilated form (4 Jas. 1. c. 1), which abolished laws hostile to Scotland.

North of the border, the Parliament of Scotland set up its own commission in July 1604, a group of 30 of whom any 20 could act. It included Alexander Livingstone, 1st Earl of Linlithgow, and a group from it was at court in London (Whitehall Palace) from October to December that year. Parliamentary proceedings on the union issue showed unaccustomed independence from the Crown, no doubt bolstered by the King’s physical distance and inability to readily intervene. A matching act of 1607 removed laws hostile to England; it also addressed justice in the border area.

The proposed closer union was effectively prevented by opposition in the English House of Commons in 1607. Leading opponents of union were Thomas Wentworth and Henry Yelverton. A notably disingenuous tactic of Sandys, to argue that only a "perfect" union should be accepted, was decisive in this session by its blocking of incremental progress.

The stalling of union in the English Parliament did not immediately kill the idea. King James pursued the matter further through George Home, 1st Earl of Dunbar, and then in discussions with Alexander Seton, 1st Earl of Dunfermline in 1608. The Scots resisted changes to their legal system. Bacon, who was not averse to reform of English law on civil law principles, wrote for the king Preparation Toward the Union of the Laws of England and Scotland (later published). English and Scottish representatives met again, but came of these moves.

=== Ireland ===
The Kingdom of Ireland figured closely in the Scottish imagination, being notionally in equal union with England, as Scotland now was, but in practice a dependency with a governor sent from London. Fears of this happening to Scotland were shared by both Unionists (for whom union would give Scotland a voice in Westminster which could not be ignored) and anti-unionists (for whom union amounted to annexation to England). Nonetheless, no proposal was floated at this time for Ireland to join the union. Even when Union was brought in during 1707, it took another ninety years for Ireland to be incorporated.

== Britain ==
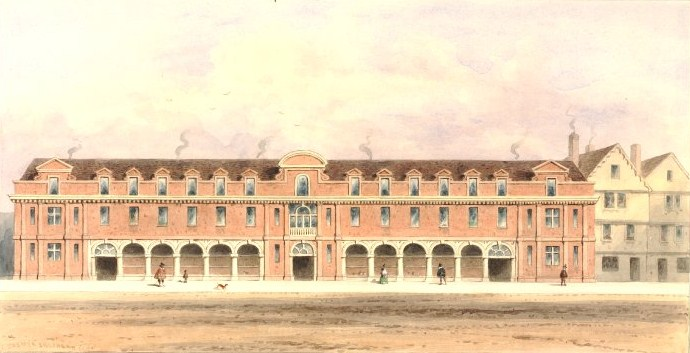
The New Exchange on the Strand in London, named "Britain's Bourse" when opened by James I. Watercolour from the 19th century by Thomas Hosmer Shepherd, after an old drawing.

Britain as a toponym had by now largely replaced Albion in literary use. But its association with the "Brutus myth" could also make it seem loaded. Sandys protested in Parliament against the royal title change, to "King of Great Britain". An argument brought up was on precedence: a "new" kingdom of Britain would lose its position among (European) kingdoms.

Anthony Weldon, with animus against James, later mocked "Britain" as a barbarous Scottish invention. The long descriptive poem Poly-Olbion by Michael Drayton was belated in terms of its contribution to the union debate, but is now seen as engaging in British and Saxon history at a local level. The plantation of Ulster was recognised at the time as conforming to the imperial British model.

== Imperial title ==
Sir William Maurice proposed in the Commons in 1604, and again in 1606, that James should adopt the title "Emperor of Great Britain", an unpopular idea.

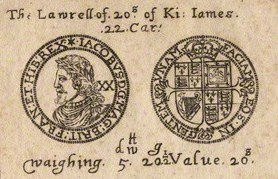
Laurel coin showing James I with laurel wreath, a Roman pattern of imperial crown

James was hailed by some as successor to Constantine, Roman Emperor identified as "British". The imperial idea had been exploited by Elizabeth I, and was available to James, as in the apocalyptic concept of Last Roman Emperor; but John Foxe equated the Christian Emperor with Constantine the Great. James's own project has been called an "imperial vision of godly monarchy".

== See also ==
- Union of England and Scotland Act 1603
- List of Jacobean union tracts
