= 1660 in poetry =

Nationality words link to articles with information on the nation's poetry or literature (for instance, Irish or France).

== Events ==
- The return to power of Charles II of England, with a triumphant entrance into London on May 29, results in the publication of numerous panegyrics and similar verse by English poets praising the monarch. However, the anti-monarchist John Milton is forced into hiding as a warrant for his arrest is issued in June, his writings are burned and he is imprisoned from October to December.

== Works published ==
- Elias Ashmole, Sol in Ascendente; or, The Glorious Appearance of Charles the Second, upon the Horizon of London, in her Horoscopicall Sign, Gemini, anonymous, on Charles II, who entered London on May 29 this year
- Charles Cotton, A Panegyrick to the King's Most Excellent Majesty
- Abraham Cowley:
  - Ode, Upon the Blessed Restoration and Returne of His Sacred Majestie, Charls, on Charles II, who entered London on May 29 of this year
  - writing under the pen name "Ezekiel Grebner", a purported grandson of Paul Grebner, The Visions and Prophecies Concerning England, Scotland, and Ireland of Ezekiel Grebner, published this year, although the book states "1661"; a royalist political satire, in prose and verse
- Sir William Davenant:
  - "A Panegyric to his Excellency the Lord General Monck", to George Monck
  - "Poem, Upon His Sacred Majesties Most Happy Return to His Dominions", on Charles II, who entered London on May 29 of this year
- Sir Robert Howard, Poems
- John Phillips, Montelion, 1660; or, The Proheticall Almanack, published under the pen name "Montelion, knight of the oracle, a well-wisher to the mathematicks", a verse satire on William Lilly's almanacs
- Robert Wild, Iter Boreale
- John Wilmot, Earl of Rochester:
  - Epicedia Academiæ Oxoniensis, a collection of poems offering condolence with the Queen Mother, Henrietta Maria, for the death of her daughter Mary, the Princess Royal; two poems in the collection have been attributed to John Wilmot, Earl of Rochester: a Latin poem, "In Obitum Serenissimae Mariae Principis Arausionensis," and an English poem, "To Her Sacred Majesty, the Queen Mother, on the Death of Mary, Princess of Orange."
  - Editor, Britannia Rediviva Oxford: Excudebat A. & L. Lichfield, Acad. Typogr., anthology
- George Wither, Speculum Speculativum; or, A Considering-Glass

== Births ==
Death years link to the corresponding "[year] in poetry" article:

- By May – Anne Killigrew (died 1685), English poet and painter

== Deaths ==
Birth years link to the corresponding "[year] in poetry" article:

- September 12 – Jacob Cats (born 1576), Dutch poet
- October 6 – Paul Scarron (born 1610), French poet, playwright and novelist
- date not known
  - Faqi Tayran, also spelled "Feqiyê Teyran", pen name of Mir Mihemed (born 1590), Kurdish
  - Sir Thomas Urquhart (born 1611), Scottish

== See also ==
- Poetry
- 17th century in poetry
- 17th century in literature
- Restoration literature
