= George Lyon, 5th Lord Glamis =

Scottish nobleman

George Lyon, 5th Lord Glamis (died 1505) was a Scottish nobleman. He was the eldest son of John Lyon, 4th Lord Glamis, who he succeeded in 1500. He died young in February 1505 and was succeeded by his brother John Lyon, 6th Lord Glamis.

Peerage of Scotland
Preceded by John Lyon	Lord Glamis; 1500–1505	Succeeded by John Lyon
