= George Douglas, Master of Angus =

Scottish nobleman

- Born: 1469; Tantallon Castle, Kingdom of Scotland
- Died: 9 September 1513; Flodden
- Noble family: House of Douglas and Angus
- Spouse: Elizabeth Drummond
- Issue Detail: Archibald Douglas, 6th Earl of Angus; Sir George Douglas of Pittendreich; William Douglas; Elizabeth Douglas; Alison Douglas; Janet Douglas
- Father: Archibald Douglas, 5th Earl of Angus
- Mother: Elizabeth Boyd

George Douglas, Master of Angus (1469 – 9 September 1513) was a Scottish Nobleman. The son of Archibald Douglas, 5th Earl of Angus and Elizabeth Boyd, daughter of Robert Boyd, 1st Lord Boyd, he was born at Tantallon Castle and died at the Battle of Flodden.

== Overview ==
In 1489 the 5th Earl of Angus, Douglas's father resigned his lordships of Tantallon, Douglasdale, Liddesdale, Ewesdale, Eskdale, Selkirk, and Jedburgh Forest to the crown. James III then granted a new charter in favour of the Master.

During the stand off between James III and the party backing his son James, then Duke of Rothesay, the Master attended the last parliament of the king before his death in the Battle of Sauchieburn. It is not recorded to which faction the younger Angus adhered to. He attended parliament again under the newly crowned James IV in 1490.

The Master did not take an active part in Public affairs until 1499 when he took formal control over his lordships of Eskdale and Ewesdale. These lordships had become renowned for lawlessness and banditry, and the Master was appointed by the King as warden of Eskdale. In his capacity of Warden he met with his English counterpart Lord Dacre at Canonbie to hear grievances and fix punishments.

The Younger Angus was not a particularly effective at restoring law and order. His undue leniency to his own tenantry caused the King to deprive him of office in 1506, granting it instead to Alexander Home, 3rd Lord Home. George did however, gain the Barony of Crawford-Lindsay in 1510, and his father made over his estates of Kirriemuir, Abernethy, and Horsehopecleugh in the same year.

== Death at Flodden Field ==
In late August 1513 the Master of Angus rode out with his father the Earl, and his younger brother Sir William Douglas of Glenbervie at the head of a large Douglas contingent and their adherents. On reaching the mustering point at the Ellemford, north of Duns, they joined with the largest and most modern army that Scotland had ever fielded. The army proceeded under King James into England where it eventually met with the army of the Earl of Surrey at Flodden Edge.

A petulant Earl of Angus, having had his advice snubbed by King James, left the field and returned to Scotland, leaving the Master and his brother in charge of the Douglas contingent.

Nothing more is recorded of the Master of Angus except an anecdote recorded by David Hume of Godscroft recording the last moments of King James. When Sir Edward Stanley had broken the Scottish left under the Earl of Lennox and Earl of Argyll. King James in the centre dismounted and prepared to make his stand amongst his spearmen. On noticing the Master of Angus still on horseback, he cried to him, "asking if it had been in the manner of his race to remain mounted while their sovereign fought on foot". To which the Master replied asking whether "it was the fashion of the King of Scots to wear his mail and armorial bearings while fighting on foot". The master hit a raw nerve in James's chivalric mind and he replied "I dare fight upon my feet as well as you or any subject I have, and that without coat-armour or royal cognisance."

The English billmen now closed on the Scottish centre and King James was found within a spear length of Surrey. Whether Godscroft's anecdote is true or not, that the Master of Angus's taunts drove him to his death, the Master was equal to the King in reckless gallantry. The Master's corpse was found amongst the twelve Scottish Earls and seventeen Lords who died. According to Godscroft over 200 men of the name of Douglas also died.

== Marriage ==
In 1485 the Master of Angus was contracted in marriage to Margaret, daughter of Laurence Oliphant, 1st Lord Oliphant. It appears that this contract was not fulfilled as George was wed in 1488 to Elizabeth Drummond, daughter of John Drummond, 1st Lord Drummond. The marriage ran afoul of the strictures of a small feudal society such as Scotland: it was found out some years after the marriage that it was within the prohibited degrees of consanguinity. The Master of Angus applied for and successfully obtained Papal dispensation in 1495.

== Issue ==
By Elizabeth Drummond, George Master of Angus had three sons and four daughters:

- Archibald Douglas, 6th Earl of Angus
- Sir George Douglas of Pittendreich
- William Douglas, Prior of Coldingham and Abbot of Holyrood
- Elizabeth Douglas, married John Hay, 3rd Lord Yester
- Alison Douglas, married 1) Robert Blackadder of that Ilk (died 1513) and then David Home of Wedderburn
- Janet Douglas, (1498-1537) (executed by James V) married John Lyon, 6th Lord Glamis
- Margaret Douglas, married James Douglas of Drumlanrig

== Sources ==
- Maxwell, Sir Herbert. A History of the House of Douglas. Freemantle, London. 1902
- Barr, Niall. Flodden. Tempus, Stroud. 2003
- Brown, Michael. The Black Douglases. Tuckwell Press, East Linton. 1998
