= David Hume of Godscroft =

Scottish historian and political theorist

David Hume or Home of Godscroft (1558–1629) was a Scottish historian and political theorist, poet and controversialist, a major intellectual figure in Jacobean Scotland. It has been said that "Hume marks the culmination of the Scottish humanist tradition."

Confusion is possible with David Hume or Home, Scottish minister at Duras in France, a contemporary: they had quite different views on the union with England.

== Life ==
He was the second son of Sir David Hume or Home, 7th Lord of Wedderburn, a Roman Catholic traditionalist of the Merse (now Berwickshire), who had married an active Calvinist wife in Mary Johnston of Elphinstone. He studied at Dunbar grammar school, under Andrew Simson. He then entered the University of St Andrews in 1578, and after a course of study there travelled on the continent. From France he went on to Geneva, intending to travel to Italy.

Hume was recalled to Scotland by the serious illness of his elder brother George, returning about 1581. Both brothers supported the Ruthven raid of 1582. In 1583 he was residing as private secretary with his relative Archibald Douglas, 8th Earl of Angus, who was ordered, after James VI withdrew his confidence from the Ruthven Lords, to remain in the north of Scotland.

During the exile of the Ruthven party at Newcastle, Hume was in London, ostensibly studying, but actively interesting himself in Angus and his cause. The Lords, with Hume, returned to Scotland in 1585, and between that date and 1588, when Angus died.

In later life Hume devoted himself to literature on his property of Gowkscroft, a farming hamlet 2 miles to the north of Abbey St. Bathans, in the Lammermuir Hills, Berwickshire, which he renamed Godscroft, and styled himself Theagrius when he figured as a Latin poet.

== Works ==
=== Political and religious writings ===
Hume supported his patron Angus's policy in a series of letters (preserved in the History of the Houses of Douglas and Angus) on the doctrine of obedience to princes. A discussion of a sermon on the same theme by the Rev. John Craig is the subject of Conference betwixt the Erle of Angus and Mr. David Hume, which is printed in David Calderwood's History of the Kirk of Scotland. Hume contests in this dialogue, based on actual conversation, the political theories of Jean Bodin and Adam Blackwood.

In 1605 a union tract by Robert Pont suggested Hume's treatise De Unione Insulæ Britanniæ, a study in how to effect the closer political union of Scotland and England. The first part Tractatus I. was published in London (1605). In terms of the Jacobean debate on the Union, Hume went further than anyone else in looking to a unified "British society" to result from the Union of the Crowns of 1603.

On the relative values of episcopacy and presbytery, Hume was a persistent polemicist in discussing the theme: first with James Law, bishop of Orkney, from 1608 to 1611; and secondly, in 1613, with William Cowper, bishop of Galloway. He was also responsible about the same time for De Episcopatu, 1 May 1609, Patricio Simsono, to Patrick Simson. Hume's other major Latin prose writings are his unpublished attack on William Camden for his depreciatory view of Scotland, written in 1617—Cambdenia; id est, Examen nonnullorum a Gulielmo Cambreno in "Britannia,"—and a work dedicated to Charles I (Paris, 1626), entitled Apologia Basilica; seu Machiavelli Ingenium Examinatum, in libro quem inscripsit Princeps.

=== Neo-Latin poetry ===
Hume wrote Latin poems when very young, and received the commendation of George Buchanan. Buchanan was an intellectual leader for the Scottish Presbyterians, among whom Hume was prominent, and as a close a follower as Buchanan had. In the end he showed dislike for the "angry" Buchanan, who had a quite different view of the Douglas family.

Hume's Daphn-Amaryllis was a celebration of Anglo-Scottish union, printed in Edinburgh and London editions, in 1603–5. It consists of four eclogues, and drew on the Liber Pluscardensis and John Mair's Historia, in a setting of "leonine prophecy". In citing this poem in his second union Tractatus, Hume explicitly references both the Lion of Judah (associated with the Davidic Kingdom), and the Lion of Scotland, linking both with the "Lion of the North" prophecy of Paul Grebner; with a simple heraldic code, he also indicated the expansionism of the new kingdom, desiring the removal of the tressure bordering the Scottish lion rampant (harking back to the time of James III of Scotland).

The Lusus Poetici (1605) were ultimately incorporated in Arthur Johnston's Deliciæ Poetarum Scotorum (1637). When Henry Frederick, Prince of Wales died, Hume wrote a memorial tribute entitled Henrici Principis Justa, and in 1617 he welcomed the king back to Scotland in his Regi suo Gratulatio. His collected Latin poems were twice issued in Paris, in 1632 and 1639, the second time with additions under the care of his son James, and with the title: Davidis Humii Wedderburnensis Poemata Omnia. Accessere ad finem Unio Britannica et Prœlium ad Lipsiam soluta oratione.

=== Family history ===
Hume was a partisan panegyricist of the Douglas family. He is also said to have "plundered Scottish history for exemplars" within the Douglases, and with the aim of encouraging military services to the king. Arthur Williamson has argued that "Scots wrote histories of great families as general histories of Scotland". A grandson of Alison Douglas, herself a granddaughter of Archibald Douglas, 5th Earl of Angus, Hume has as his main patron William Douglas, 11th Earl of Angus, later the 1st Marquess of Douglas.

Hume's History of the House and Race of Douglas and Angus was printed at Edinburgh in 1644 by Evan Tyler, the king's printer. He is thought to have finished the history between 1625 and 1630 (around the year of his death). The political message of the work includes the idea that direct action against "evil advisers" of a king is permissible to defend customary rights; and even against the king. The title-pages of early copies vary, with some having the title A Generall History of Scotland, together with a particular History of the Houses of Douglas and Angus. Confusion arose when the editor, Anna Hume, encountered opposition of Angus, who resented the use which Hume had made of some of the material in the family archives.

The work begins with Sholto Douglas, conqueror of Donald Bane, and concludes with Archibald Douglas, 8th Earl of Angus, who is eulogised in a Latin ode and numerous elegiacs. Another manuscript history of the family brings the record close to the death of William Douglas, 10th Earl of Angus, in 1611, and is ascribed to that earl. The tenth earl's son, William Douglas, is said to have threatened its publication in order that Hume's work might be superseded, due to subjective and accuracy in some of his writings.

Hume's History of the House of Wedderburn, written by a Son of the Family, in the year 1611, was a Latin eulogy, Davidis Humii de Familia Humia Wedderburnensi Liber. It begins with David, the first laird of Wedderburn, about the end of the fourteenth century. It closes with an account of Hume's own early career in connection with that of his elder brother, to whom, along with the Earl of Home, it is dedicated. It remained in manuscript till 1839, when it was printed by the Abbotsford Club.

== Family ==
Hume married in 1594 Barbara Johnston, widow of his friend James Haldane. They had five children. His daughter Anna Hume was known as an editor, and his son James Hume of Godscroft (fl. 1630) as a mathematician.

== Notes ==
Attribution

This article incorporates text from a publication now in the public domain: Lee, Sidney, ed. (1891). "Hume, David (1560?-1630?)". Dictionary of National Biography. Vol. 28. London: Smith, Elder & Co.
