= List of Jacobean union tracts =

This is a list of Jacobean union tracts, published or manuscript treatises bearing on the Jacobean debate on the Union.

== Scottish authors ==
Year	Author	Title	Comment
Around 1604	Sir Thomas Craig	De Unione Regnorum Britanniae Tractatus	Published 1909
1604	John Gordon	EnΩtikon or a Sermon of the Union of Great Britain	Preached before King James at Whitehall.
1603	John Gordon	A Panegyrique of Congratulation for the Concord of the Realmes of Great Britain	Written in French, translated by Edward Grimston, published under new titles in 1604.
1605	David Hume of Godscroft	De Unione Insulae Britanniae Tractatus	Favoured a union of equal partners
1605 manuscript	David Hume	Tractatus Secundus	Not published at the time; printed in the collections of Robert Sibbald and Robert Wodrow.
1604 manuscript outline	James Maxwell	Britaines Union in Love	Emphasis on divine providence.
1604 in Latin	Robert Pont	De Unione Britanniæ, seu de Regnorum Angliæ et Scotiæ omniumque adjacentum insularum in unam monarchiam consolidatione, deque multiplici ejus unionis utilitate, dialogus Of the Union of Britayne
	John Russell	A treatise of the happie and blissed Unioun

== English authors ==
Year	Author	Title	Comment
	Anonymous manuscript	A Briefe Replication to the Answers of the Objections Against the Union	On objections of the House of Commons.
	Anonymous manuscript	A Discourse against the Union	Considers 19 European precedents, finding that only the Polish–Lithuanian Commonwealth had a serious "statutory union".
	Anonymous manuscript	A Discourse on the Proposed Union between England and Scotland founded on the opinions of Historians Ancient and Modern	Rejects a legal union.
	Anonymous manuscript	A discourse on the union as being triple-headed	Opposed a trade and legal union.
	Anonymous manuscript	The Divine Providence in the misticall and reall union of England and Scotland
	Anonymous manuscript	A treatise about the Union of England and Scotland
1604	Anonymous manuscript	Pro Unione	For the union, anti-Catholic
1604	Anonymous manuscript	Rapta Tatio	For a legal union.
	Anonymous manuscript	Union by Concurrency of the Homager State with the Superior	Recommends an extra-parliamentary route to fuller union.
1603	Francis Bacon	A Brief Discourse touching the Happy Union of the Kingdoms of England and Scotland	In favour of a union of fundamental laws.
1604	Francis Bacon	Certain Articles or Considerations touching the Union of the Kingdoms of England and Scotland	Written for the Union commission.
	William Clerk	Ancillans Synopsis	Supported John Thornborough.
1604	Sir William Cornwallis	The Miraculous and Happie Union of England and Scotland	Pro-union.
	John Dodderidge	A breif [sic] consideracion of the Unyon of twoe kingedomes
1605	Alberico Gentili	De Unione Regnorum Britanniae	Favours perfect union, from a civil law perspective.
1604	John Hayward	A Treatise of Union of the Two realmes of England and Scotland	Calls for some union of the common law and Scottish law systems.
	Sir Henry Savile	Historicall Collections
	Sir Henry Spelman	Of the Union
1604	John Thornborough	A Discourse plainely proving the evident Utilitie and urgent necessitie of the desired happie Union of the two famous Kingdomes of England and Scotland	Reply to the House of Commons and their opposition to the change of the king's title.
Undated pamphlet	John Thornborough	The Joiefull and Blessed Reuniting the two mighty and famous Kingdomes, England and Scotland, in their ancient name of Great Brittaine	Precedents for aspects of the union.
