= Margaret Lyon =

Margaret Lyon (died 1625) was a Scottish aristocrat and landowner.

She was the daughter of John Lyon, 7th Lord Glamis and Janet Keith, daughter of Robert Keith, Master of Marischal, and sister of William Keith, 4th Earl Marischal.

== Families ==
She married Gilbert Kennedy, 4th Earl of Cassilis (d. 1576), and became the "Countess of Cassilis". Their children included:

- John Kennedy, 5th Earl of Cassilis (1575–1615)
- Hew Kennedy, Master of Cassilis (1576/77-1607)

In 1578 she married John, Lord Hamilton, Commendator of Arbroath (d. 1604). Their marriage contract was made at Maybole Castle on 30 December 1577. He was made Marquess of Hamilton in 1599.

Their children included:

- James Hamilton, 2nd Marquess of Hamilton (1589–1625).
- Margaret Hamilton, who married John Maxwell, 9th Lord Maxwell.

== Career ==
In June 1579 her income and properties were forfeited to the crown because her husband Lord Hamilton was declared a rebel. The Hamilton family lands had been raided by Regent Morton and his mother and brothers James and David captured at Craignethan Castle and taken to Linlithgow. In her favour, James VI and the Privy Council ordered that she could have all the lands and rents she had before she married John Hamilton.

In 1584 Margaret Lyon received the rebels, her brother Thomas Lyon, Master of Glamis and the Earl of Mar at the House of Cassilis in Ayrshire before the Raid of Stirling. Her possessions were declared forfeit and given to Thomas Kennedy of Bargany.

== Letters ==
Margaret Lyon and John Hamilton, like other Scottish landowners, were frequently involved in lawsuits over their properties, rights, and incomes. Margaret Lyon (and Lord Hamilton) wrote letters to Sir Patrick Vans of Barnbarroch who was a Lord of Session encouraging him to act in their favour.

She wrote on behalf of her "good friend" James Maxwell of Calderwood in July 1588. He had obtained the royal gift of the forfeited "escheat" of some people in Clydesdale and this gift was to be discussed by the Exchequer. Calderwood, she said, was in a position to reciprocate and enhance Barnbarroch's reputation, "he may have occasion both to continue his former goodwill, as also to report the courtesy shown be you, for there is no pleasure you do him but I will account the same as done to myself." His adversaries were people who she had "never found their goodwill".

In June 1589 she wrote from Hamilton about a hearing between her and Lady Lochermoss, alleging that "she is plainly minded to use false probation therein, both by word and writ", and the other lords of session "they all believe all is true she says, and my poor tenants can have no justice." Witnesses were to be examined, and she hoped Barnbarroch would "not fail to sit there .. on Tuesday to see that no falsehood take that matter away ... nor no collusion be used herein."

Margaret Lyon and Lord Hamilton both wrote to Barnbarroch on 29 June 1590 from Hamilton on behalf of her "assured good friend" James Maxwell of Calderwood against Lockhart of Lee about the lands of Kincaid. She wrote that if Calderwood was successful, "you shall have my Lord my husband obliged to acquit as you shall have occasion".

On 4 March 1593 she wrote from Kinneil House for his "goodwill and favour" in their case against Peter Young, which she claimed was "a thing altogether agreeable to the common law of the country and good conscience". On 4 March 1594 she wrote from Kinniel thanking him and mentioning another case, advising him to consult the Lord Chancellor, John Maitland of Thirlestane and her brother, the Master of Glamis.
