= Alexander of Roes =

German Catholic priest and canon law jurist

Alexander of Roes (died after 1288) was the dean of St. Maria im Kapitol, Cologne, canon law jurist, and author on history and prophecy. He was a member of a patrician Cologne family and was a member of the social group in Rome headed by Cardinal Jacobus de Columna, to whom he dedicated "Memoriale...".

== Views ==
In the period from about 1250 to 1280, Jordan of Osnabrück followed by Alexander wrote two tracts (the Memoriale) supporting the Holy Roman Empire as a German institution. The subject insisted the land south of the Rhine River was Germanic. This period covered the rapid decline of the House of Hohenstaufen, and Alexander acknowledged the role of the papacy, then at its peak. He broadly accepted the papal interpretation of translatio imperii. In terms of the Church he was a reformer, looking for the end of simony.

Alexander utilised threefold divisions to lay down a social theory, of Western Christendom. There were three major "nations": French, German and Italians. The Church was sustained by sacerdotium (the clergy), imperium (the Empire), and studium (scholarship); the first and last of these were matched to Rome and Paris, respectively. There were three social classes: the common folk, the clergy and the military. In France public life was largely run by clergy; in Italy it was the common sort who predominated; while in Germany the soldiers (nobles) took the lead.

Alexander was following Vincent of Beauvais, and then Martin von Troppau, in considering a translatio of studium to Paris, supposedly made by Charlemagne. Conceding both the religious authority of the Pope, and the (quite mythical) antiquity of the University of Paris, Alexander's style of argument allowed him to assert strongly the authority of the Empire, as German, in the field of imperium. The context was that the rising French monarchy was discounting the authority of the Emperor, and a real possibility it would claim imperium for itself.

== Works ==
Alexander of Roes's major work was the Memoriale, comprising Memoriale de prerogativa Romani imperii with De translatio imperii (c.1281), of which he wrote the second only, following modern scholarship. It is suggested that work belongs to the period after the election of Rudolf von Habsburg, as King of the Romans; and was directly inspired by Alexander's experience of the election of Pope Martin IV. At that time Alexander was with the papal curia, and was employed as chaplain by Cardinal Giacomo Colonna. In the De translatio, Alexander brings up the Last World Emperor in a form adapted to a second Germanic Charlemagne. Incorporated was the De prerogativa Romani imperii, a treatise of Jordan of Osnabrück on the legitimacy of the Roman Empire in its pagan period.

Other works were:

- Pavo (c.1285) (i.e. peacock), a parody in which a peacock represents the Pope.
- Noticia seculi. Adopts from De semine scripturarum (c.1205) a prophecy on the recovery of Palestine and church reform by 1315. The work, of 1288, is dedicated to a Roman nobleman, not named, but thought to be Giacomo Colonna.

== Legacy ==
The Memoriale, also in later manuscripts called Chronica, gave rise to the so-called "Magdeburg prophecy". Around 1280, when Alexander was writing, it was intended to bolster a claim by Charles of Anjou to become Holy Roman Emperor. Much later it was taken to apply to Emperor Charles V, in his time. It was alluded to, as from Magdeburg, by Johann Carion in his Chronica of 1533. It was given a new lease of life by its inclusion in the Lectiones memorabiles et reconditae (1600) of Johann Wolff, by Wolfgang Lazius, and by James Maxwell, who drew on a translation by Hermann Bonus. Maxwell applied it to the future Charles I of England. After Charles I's execution, William Lilly, who knew the prophecy from Maxwell's work, was concerned in Monarchy or No Monarchy (1651) to argue that it did not apply to "Charles II of Scotland".
