= John Lyon, 6th Lord Glamis =

Scottish nobleman

John Lyon, 6th Lord Glamis (died 1528) was a Scottish nobleman. He was the second son of John Lyon, 4th Lord Glamis, and succeeded his brother as Lord Glamis in 1505.

John married Janet Douglas (died 17 July 1537), who was falsely charged with witchcraft by King James V and burned at the stake on Castle Hill, Edinburgh, Scotland. She was a daughter of George Douglas, Master of Angus, and sister to Archibald Douglas, 6th Earl of Angus. His son John Lyon, 7th Lord Glamis, was still a minor when the 6th Lord died in 1528. John was 16 years old and was witness to his mother being burned alive.

Peerage of Scotland
Preceded by George Lyon	Lord Glamis; 1505–1528	Succeeded by John Lyon
