= Jordan of Osnabrück =

German political writer

Jordan of Osnabrück (c. 1220 – 15 April 1284) was a political writer of the 13th century from the Holy Roman Empire. He is known for his work De praerogativa Romani imperii. Antony Black writes: "In the tracts written between c. 1250 and c. 1281 by Jordan of Osnabrück and Alexander of Roes [...] it was claimed that divine dispensation had allotted the empire to Germans via Charlemagne."

He died at Osnabrück.
