= James Maxwell (scholar) =

James Maxwell (c.1581 – in or after 1635) was a Scottish scholar, known as an author on mythology and prophecy. Most of his works are lost. He advocated for the view that the House of Stuart would found the Last World Empire of prophetic tradition.

== Life ==
He was the only son of William Maxwell of Little Airds, and grandson of William Maxwell of Kirkconnell, Kirkcudbrightshire, man-at-arms to James V of Scotland, and also in the service of his queen, Mary of Guise, and of his daughter, Mary Queen of Scots. He was educated at Edinburgh University, where he graduated M.A. 29 July 1600. In his Edinburgh time he was a follower of John Napier. He then went abroad.

Maxwell lived in London for a period, and renounced Calvinism in 1607, adopting a conservative religious viewpoint. He spent time in the Tower of London from the middle of 1620 to February 1621, after publishing a pamphlet against the claim of the Elector Palatine to Bohemia. This slant towards the House of Habsburg, at the outbreak of the Thirty Years' War, put paid to Maxwell's hopes of advancement in England, and in particular of a post he coveted, historian in Chelsea College. He then returned to the continent of Europe.

Around 1630 Maxwell had been working as genealogist to Philip IV of Spain. On 30 April 1631 he wrote from Brussels to Archbishop William Laud, complaining of threats of assassination because he would not forsake Protestantism. Emperor Ferdinand II had, he declared, commanded his presence at court, and offered him spiritual preferment, with the office of imperial antiquary and genealogist, and a pension of a thousand crowns after the death of Sebastian Tegnangel. (Tegnangel in fact died in 1636.) In recompense for his books written in defence of the Church of England against the Puritans, and towards finishing one on the king's genealogy, he asked for a lay prebend. Gilbert Blackhall commented on Scots of this period who had spurned offers from the Spanish king, and their lack of Habsburg prospects (and may have had Maxwell in mind). Court patronage generally dried up in Brussels after 1633.

== Works ==
Maxwell dealt in his publications with religion, history, genealogy, and antiquarian research, as well as poetry. His style has been compared to that of Sir Thomas Urquhart, and earned from Laud the nickname "Mountebank Maxwell". He identified with a neo-Platonic tradition, against Aristotelianism: Plato and Hermes Trismegistus, but also Giovanni Pico della Mirandola, Marsilio Ficino, and Franciscus Patricius.

=== Admirable and Notable Prophecies ===
Admirable and Notable Prophecies (1615) has been called Maxwell's "most substantial" publication, and touches on a wide range of prophetic material. He had been evolving, since the death of Henry Frederick, Prince of Wales, a prophetic future around Prince Charles, Henry's brother. In his 1612 memorial work for Prince Henry, Maxwell also flattered Prince Charles with a far-fetched comparison to Skanderbeg, relying on the equation of Albania with Albany. The following year, as Charles's sister Elizabeth married, he put a flattering turn on a well-known prophecy of Johann Carion about Emperor Charles V, for the benefit of Prince Charles. Carion by misprision had revived an older prophecy of Alexander of Roes (c.1280), intended to apply to Charles of Anjou and his claim to become Emperor.

Admirable and Notable Prophecies of 1615 shifted ground somewhat. It is a history of prophecy from Hildegard of Bingen to Nostradamus, with emphasis on Joachim of Fiore. Supporting the House of Stuart's imperial claim, Maxwell cites here a shortened form of the Second Charlemagne prophecy, in the form given to it by Telesphorus of Cosenza, which was originally a pro-French slant on the Last Emperor. In this work he correspondingly places less emphasis on the Magdeburg (Carion) prophecy as applied to Prince Charles; but it was later picked up and reinforced by the Anglo-Saxon scholar William Retchford. After Charles I's execution, William Lilly, who knew the prophecy as given currency by Maxwell's work, was concerned in Monarchy or No Monarchy (1651) to argue that it did not apply to "Charles II of Scotland".

Maxwell argues that the apostasy of the Catholic Church can be read from Catholic authors. He also goes back to Carion, through a Latin version of Hermann Bonus, to pick up a related Magdeburg prophecy on the reformation of the Roman Catholic Church. He believed that this change could be non-violent; and that Charles was a fit person to retake Constantinople, restoring the Eastern Roman Empire. Opposing the Ottoman Empire as he did, he supported also the House of Habsburg. Maxwell found both a popular audience for verse summaries of his ideas, and some learned sympathy with Henry Spelman, Matthew Sutcliffe, and Patrick Young.

=== Other works ===
While in France in 1600 Maxwell wrote in Latin Tyrannidi-graphia Ecclesiæ militantis secundum Danielis Prophetiam. It was dedicated to Edinburgh University and sent, but was lost on the way, by John Welsh of Ayr. Among his productions is a poem entitled Carolanna, for the death of Anne of Denmark in 1619; Maxwell wrote it under the pseudonym of James Anneson, a play on the names of the king, queen, and their son Charles.

Maxwell also published:

- The Treasure of Tranquillity, or a Manuall of Moral Discourses, Tending to the Tranquillity of the Minde (1611). It contains commentary on the prophecies attributed to Merlin, and their realisation in James VI and I.
- The Golden Legend, or the Mirrour of Religious Men and Godly Matrones, concerning Abraham, Isaac, Jacob, and their Wives, London, 1611.
- The Golden Art, or The right way of Enriching. . . . Very profitable for all such persons in citie or countrie as doe desire to get, increase, conserue, and vse goods with a good conscience, London, 1611.
- Queene Elizabeths Looking-glasse of Grace and Glory, wherein may be seen the fortune of the faithfull: that is to say, the wrastling, victory, and reward, or the combat, conquest, and Crowne of Gods children, London, by E. Allde, 1612.
- Jamesanna, or a Pythagoricall play at Cardes, representing the Excellency and vtilitie of Vnion and Concord, with the incommodities of diuision and discorde, dedicated to the most hopefull Prince Charles, 1612 (?)
- A Speedy Passage to Heaven, or a perfect direction for every Christian to walk in the right path of true holinesse, containing an explanation of the tenne Commandments, the creede, and our Lords Prayer, with divers other godly prayers, London, 1612.
- A Christian Almanacke, needefull and true for all countryes, persons and times, faithfully calculated by the course of holy Scripture, London, 1612.
- The Laudable Life, and Deplorable Death, of our late peerlesse Prince Henry. Briefly represented. Together with some other Poemes, in honour both of our most gracious Soueraigne King James his auspicious entrie to this Crowne, and also of his most hopefull Children, Prince Charles and Princesse Elizabeths happy entrie into this world, London, by E. Allde, for T. Pauier, 1612, entered at Stationers' Hall 28 November. The main poem in it consists of forty-four six-line stanzas, and is succeeded by Peerelesse Prince Henries Epitaph in his owne foure Languages (i.e. English, French, Latin, and Greek).
- Two Genealogical Tables or Pedigrees of the two most noble Princes Fredericke Prince Palatine, and the Lady Elizabeth his wife, shewing their Lineall discent equally, first from Robert the Emperour, and Prince Palatine, and Elizabeth the Empresse his Wife, in the 9 and 10 Degrees, and then from Edward the 3, the most victorious King of England, and Queene Philippa his Wife in the 11 Degree.
- A Monvment of Remembrance erected in Albion, in honour of the magnificent Departvre from Brittannie, and honourable receiuing in Germany, namely at Heidelberge, of the two most noble Princes Fredericke and Elizabeth. . . . Both of them being almost in one and the same degree of lineall descent from 25 Emperours of the East and West, of Romanes, Greekes, and Germans, and from 30 Kings of diuers countries, London, 1613. For the wedding of Frederick V, Elector Palatine with Elizabeth Stuart.
- A New Eightfold Probation of the Chvrch of Englands Divine Constitvtion, prooved by many Pregnant arguments to be much more complete than any Geneuian in the world against the contrary assertion of the fifty-three petitioner-preachers of Scotland in their petition presented to the Kings most excellent Majesty, London, 1617. Against a prophecy of Paul Grebner.
- A Demonstrative Defence, or Tenfold Probation of the Doctrine of the Church of England tovching one of the most important points of our Creed, . . . which is of our Sauiours descending into hell after death to binde and subdue Sathan, London, 1617.
- Herodian of Alexandria, His History of Twenty Roman Caesars and Emperors (of his Time). Interpreted out of the Greeke Originall, London, 1629; another edit. 1635.
- Emblema Animæ, or Morall Discourses reflecting upon Humanitie, by John Du Plessis, Cardinal Richelieu, translated into English, London, 1635.

Maxwell printed a catalogue of 22 of his unpublished works: controversial theology, royal genealogies and panegyrics, a poem on the antiquity of the city of London, tracts on fortune-telling and astrology, A Centurie of most noble Questions in Philosophie, James-anna, or the Patterne of a Perfect Cittie, among others. A list in Carolanna contained fifteen more Latin titles.

== Notes ==
Attribution: This article incorporates text from a publication now in the public domain: Lee, Sidney, ed. (1894). "Maxwell, James (fl. 1600–1640)". Dictionary of National Biography. Vol. 37. London: Smith, Elder & Co.
