= John Lyon, 4th Lord Glamis =

Scottish Nobleman

John Lyon, 4th Lord Glamis (died 1500), son of John Lyon, 3rd Lord Glamis, was a Scottish nobleman. He married Elizabeth Gray, the daughter of Andrew, Lord Gray. They had two children:

- George Lyon (d. 1505), who succeeded his father as Lord Glamis
- John Lyon, who succeeded his brother as 6th Lord of Glamis.

Lyon, the 4th Lord Glamis, is the direct male ancestor of the all later Lords Glamis and Earls of Strathmore and Kinghorne, and through them, an ancestor of Queen Elizabeth the Queen Mother, Queen Elizabeth II, and King Charles III.

Peerage of Scotland
Preceded by John Lyon	Lord Glamis; 1497–1500	Succeeded by George Lyon
