= John Lyon, 7th Lord Glamis =

Scottish nobleman

John Lyon, 7th Lord Glamis (c. 1510 – 1558) was a Scottish nobleman.

== Life ==
He was born in 1510, the son of John Lyon, 6th Lord Glamis, by Janet Douglas, second daughter of George, master of Angus. His father died in 1528.

Along with his mother, who had married as her second husband Archibald Campbell of Skipnish, Glamis and others were in July 1537 placed on trial on the charge of conspiring to cause the death of James V of Scotland by poison. His mother Janet was found guilty and burnt at the stake. Glamis, then only in his sixteenth year, confessed, and was placed in prison. Some time later he was released from prison, but on 3 December 1540 his estates were annexed to the crown by an act of parliament. On 13 March 1543 the forfeiture was rescinded, and he was restored to his titles and estates.

In 1544 Glamis, along with Patrick Gray, 4th Lord Gray, and Norman Leslie, supported Charteris of Kinfauns in his attempt to seize Perth of which he had been elected Lord Provost, from William Ruthven, 2nd Lord Ruthven, who had been deprived of the provostship by Cardinal Beaton. In the following year he held a command in the vanguard of the Scottish army, which, after invading England, retired before inferior numbers.

On the forfeiture of Sir James Kirkcaldy of Grange, Glamis received on 12 September 1548 the barony of Kinghorn, with other lands. The barony had been bestowed on Kirkcaldy on 13 October 1537.

Glamis died in 1558.

== Family ==
He married Janet Joan Keith, daughter of Robert Keith, Master of Marischal, and sister of William Keith, 4th Earl Marischal. Their children included:

- John Lyon, 8th Lord Glamis
- William Lyon
- Thomas, Master of Glamis.
- Margaret Lyon, who married Gilbert Kennedy, 4th Earl of Cassilis, and then John Hamilton, 1st Marquess of Hamilton.

Peerage of Scotland
Preceded by John Lyon	Lord Glamis; 1528–1558	Succeeded by John Lyon
