= James Henrisoun =

James Henrisoun (died before 1570) was a Scottish merchant of Edinburgh, and writer in favour of Anglo-Scottish union.

== Life ==
Successful in business, Henrisoun traded with Middelburg in the Netherlands, and encountered the Protestant Reformation there. A Protestant convert in Catholic Scotland, he went to the Earl of Hertford during the 1544 English campaign in Scotland, the Burning of Edinburgh. He was taken back to London, and placed on a government pension.

== Works ==
From 1547, by which time the young Edward VI was on the English throne and Hertford had become Protector Somerset, Henrisoun produced pro-union pamphlets. His major work was An exhortacion to the Scottes to conforme them selfes to the honorable, expedient, and godly union betwene the twoo realmes of Englande and Scotlande (1547).

== Views ==
Henrisoun used the term "Great Britain", which may have been a neologism for the Scots language. His Godly and Golden Booke (1548) argued strongly that England and Scotland should become a single Protestant nation. He wished to abandon the terms "Scots" and "Englishmen", appealing to an underlying ethnicity of blood that was largely British.

In dealing with the myth of origins of the Scots, Henrisoun attacked Hector Boece, and his credulity in the matter of the Gathelus myth. He managed the dating of the arrival of Gaels in what is now Scotland with fair accuracy. At this period the mythological setting was significant.
