= Janet Douglas, Lady Glamis =

Scottish noblewoman accused of murder

Janet Douglas
- Known for: Scottish noblewoman accused of attempting to poison the King, often confused with an accusation of witchcraft
- Born: c. 1498
- Died: 17 July 1537
- Cause of death: Executed by burning
- Noble family: Douglas
- Spouse: John Lyon, 6th Lord Glamis (before 1537) Archibald Campbell of Skipnish (before 1537)
- Issue: With John; John Lyon, 7th Lord Glamis; George Lyon; Margaret Lyon; Elizabeth Lyon; With Archibald; John Campbell, of Skipness, Provost of Kilmun
- Parents: George Douglas, Master of Angus and Elizabeth Drummond

Janet Douglas, Lady Glamis (c. 1498 – 17 July 1537) was a Scottish noblewoman accused of attempted murder, who was executed by burning during the reign of James V of Scotland. Janet was accused of trying to poison James V, implicated by a spurned suitor. James hated the Douglas family and swore revenge after mistreatment by his stepfather Archibald Douglas.

== Charges for Treason ==
The Douglas family was far from favoured by King James V of Scotland; Janet's brother, Archibald Douglas, 6th Earl of Angus, was the King's stepfather, and Angus had imprisoned the young James. James' hatred for Angus extended to his whole family, including Janet. After James had broken free of the Douglas family, in December 1528, Janet was summoned for treason. She was accused with others for bringing supporters of the Earl of Angus to Edinburgh in June. However, James called her "our lovittis Dame Jonat Douglas" in a licence of 1529, allowing her and a co-accused Patrick Charteris of Cuthilgurdy to go on pilgrimage, and be exempt from legal proceedings.

A recent historian, Jamie Cameron, thinks it unlikely that Janet went on pilgrimage, as she was the subject of a number of legal actions culminating in a charge of poisoning her husband John Lyon, 6th Lord Glamis who had died on 17 September 1528. This case was dropped, and Janet was free to marry her second husband, Archibald Campbell of Skipness by the summer of 1532. However, on 17 July 1537, Janet was convicted of planning to poison the King, and communicating with her brothers, the Earl of Angus and George Douglas.

Some have alleged that James had Janet accused of witchcraft against him, but there is no record of this and Pitcairn dismisses this myth in Criminal Trials, Vol I, pp. 189-90. She was imprisoned with her husband (who escaped but was later killed) in a dungeon of Edinburgh Castle. It was easy for James to imprison Janet, but actually convicting her was more difficult. To gain "evidence", James had Janet's family members and servants subjected to torture. Janet was convicted and burned at the stake on 17 July 1537 by Edinburgh Castle, which her young son was forced to watch.

== Family ==
She was the daughter of George Douglas, Master of Angus and Elizabeth Drummond, daughter of John Drummond, 1st Lord Drummond. She married firstly to John Lyon, 6th Lord Glamis (1492–1528) and by him had issue:

- John Lyon, 7th Lord Glamis
- George Lyon
- Margaret Lyon
- Elizabeth Lyon, married 1st: John Forbes, Master of Forbes; married 2nd: Thomas Craig of Balnely; married 3rd: John Tulloch of Montcoffer; married 4th: John Abernethy.

Janet, Lady Glamis married secondly Archibald Campbell of Skipnish, second son of Archibald Campbell, 2nd Earl of Argyll, and had issue:

- John Campbell, of Skipness, Provost of Kilmun
