= Gilbert Kennedy, 4th Earl of Cassilis =

Scottish peer

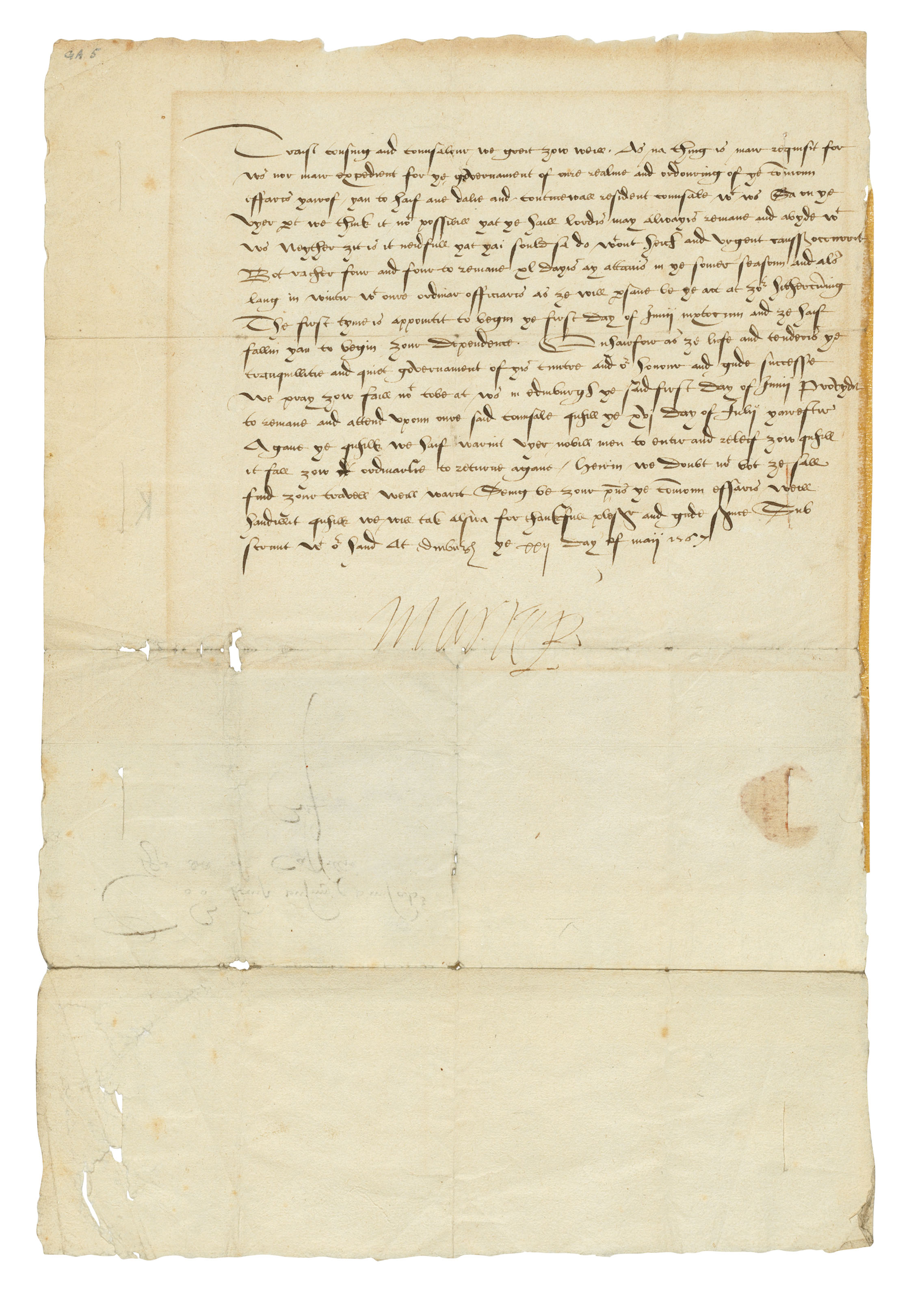
Letter sent to the Earl of Cassillis by Mary, Queen of Scots. Written in Edinburgh, dated 22 May 1567

Gilbert Kennedy, 4th Earl of Cassillis, PC (c. 1541–14 December 1576) was a Scottish peer, the son of Gilbert Kennedy, 3rd Earl of Cassillis and Margaret Kennedy. He succeeded to the titles of 6th Lord Kennedy and 4th Earl of Cassillis on 28 November 1558. He fought in the Battle of Langside on 13 May 1568, for the side of Mary, Queen of Scots.

He married Margaret Lyon, daughter of John Lyon, 7th Lord Glamis; and became a Protestant after his marriage. They had two legitimate children.

- John Kennedy, 5th Earl of Cassillis (1575–1615)
- Hew Kennedy, Master of Cassillis (1576/77-1607)

Cassillis was known as the "King of Carrick" for the feudal influence he possessed in that region.

Cassillis died in 1576 after falling from his horse.

== Reputation ==
According to Robert Pitcairn, an early historian of Clan Kennedy, Earl Gilbert was a "werry greidy manne and cairitt nocht how he gatt land sa that he culd cum be the samin". During the era of the Protestant Reformation, Earl Gilbert desired the Abbey of Glenluce and entered into transactions with the abbot in an effort to hold the abbey by feudal tenure. However, before the transaction could be completed, the abbot died. Undeterred, Gilbert turned to a monk in the abbey, requesting him to "counterfeit" the abbot's handwriting to draw up a deed and to forge the signatures of all the members of the convent. This ruse succeeded, but, fearing the monk would reveal this deceit, he solicited a peasant "to stik him". That done, he began to fear that the peasant would reveal the crime and arranged with his uncle, Hugh of Bargany, to accuse the peasant of theft and have him hanged. "And sa the landis of Glenluse wes conqueist."

== Roasting of the Commendator ==
In 1565, he seized Allan Stewart, the Commendator of Crossraguel, and imprisoned him at Dunure Castle, seeking to obtain from him certain of the rights over the lands of Crossraguel Abbey. For two days he was left to consider his fate; when Stewart proved recalcitrant, Cassillis had him dragged to the Black Vault of Dunure, and roasted him alive over a fire until he was willing to subscribe to the charters the Earl had drawn up. Stewart was finally rescued by his brother-in-law, the Laird of Bargany, who captured Dunure and procured his deliverance. The rescue, however, occasioned a feud between the subsequent Earls of Cassillis and Lairds of Bargany.

Peerage of Scotland
| Preceded by Gilbert Kennedy | Earl of Cassilis; 1558–1576 | Succeeded by John Kennedy |
