= Alison Douglas =

Alison Douglas (1480–1530) was a Landowner born in Eskdale.

== Early life ==
Douglas's parents were Elizabeth Drummond and George Douglas, Master of Angus.

Robert Blackadder of that Ilk was Douglas's first husband, though she was widowed after Flodden Field (1513). She then married David Hume who was the 4th baron of Wedderburn. Hume had two younger brothers named John and Robert who married Douglas's two daughters, the co-heiresses of the Blackadder estate, in 1518. It is thought that Humes browbeat Douglas to force these marriages.

Despite the royal proclamations put in place to protect them and their lands, landed widows and semi-orphaned daughters, including Douglas and her two daughters, were exploited in the aftermath of Flodden. Being related to Douglas earls of Angus, Douglas’s woes persisted. For instance, her husband was forfeited in 1517 for his associations with Alexander, Lord Home, though his lands were later restored.

== Death ==
Douglas is thought to have died during the year 1530 in Blackadder, Berwickshire. Later Hume generations fondly remember Douglas. This is evidenced by David Hume of Godscroft describing her as "a woman of extraordinary beauty and adorned with piety, goodness and every virtue which procured her honour and esteem from all".
