= Archibald Douglas, 6th Earl of Angus =

Scottish nobleman and politician (c. 1489–1557)

Archibald Douglas
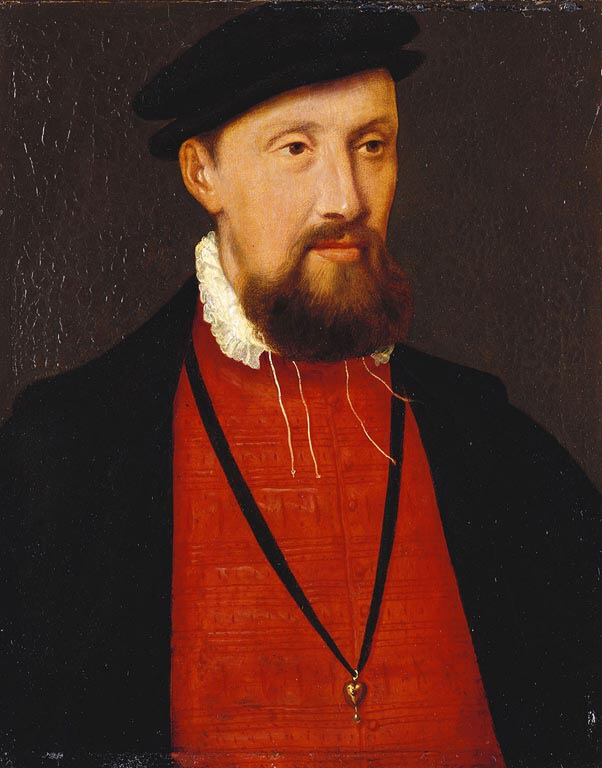

Earl of Angus
- Tenure: 1513–1557
- Predecessor: Archibald Douglas, 5th Earl of Angus
- Successor: David Douglas, 7th Earl of Angus
- Born: c. 1489; Douglasdale, Lanarkshire, Scotland
- Died: 22 January 1557 (aged 67–68); Tantallon Castle, Scotland
- Buried: Abernethy
- Offices: Lord Chancellor of Scotland
- Spouses: Margaret or Mary Hepburn Margaret Tudor (m. 1514; div. 1527) Margaret Maxwell
- Issue: Margaret Douglas, Countess of Lennox; Janet Douglas, Lady Ruthven
- Parents: George Douglas, Master of Angus; Elizabeth Drummond

Archibald Douglas, 6th Earl of Angus (c. 1489 – 22 January 1557) was a Scottish nobleman active during the reigns of James V and Mary, Queen of Scots. He was the son of George, Master of Angus, who was killed at the Battle of Flodden, and succeeded as Earl of Angus on the death of his grandfather, Archibald.

Through his daughter, Margaret, he was the maternal grandfather of Henry Stuart, Lord Darnley, and therefore the great-grandfather of James VI and I.

== Marriage to Margaret Tudor ==
In 1509, Douglas married Margaret Hepburn, daughter of Patrick Hepburn, 1st Earl of Bothwell. After her death, and that of his father in 1513, Archibald, now 6th Earl of Angus, married, on 6 August 1514, dowager queen and regent, Margaret Tudor, widow of James IV, mother of two-year-old James V, and elder sister of Henry VIII of England. The marriage stirred up the jealousy of the nobles and the opposition of the faction supporting French influence in Scotland. Civil war broke out, and Margaret lost the regency to John Stewart, Duke of Albany.

Angus withdrew to his estates in Forfarshire, while Albany besieged the queen at Stirling and got possession of the royal children; then he joined Margaret after her flight at Morpeth, and on her departure for London, returned and made his peace with Albany in 1516. He met her once more at Berwick in June 1517, when Margaret returned to Scotland on Albany's departure in vain hopes of regaining the regency. Meanwhile, during Margaret's absence, Angus had become involved with a daughter of the Laird of Traquair. Angus had a daughter named Lady Janet Douglas with Lady Jane of Traquair and seized some property belonging to his then wife, Margaret Tudor, an estate at Newark and proceeded to live in it openly with his wife and illegitimate child. Margaret, however, was more annoyed with Douglas over his seizure and usage of her dower income as dowager queen of Scotland than the birth of his illegitimate daughter.

Margaret avenged his neglect by refusing to support his claims for power and by secretly trying through Albany to get a divorce. In Edinburgh, Angus held his own against the attempts of the Earl of Arran, to dislodge him. But the return of Albany in 1521, with whom Margaret now sided against her husband, deprived him of power. The regent took the government into his own hands, Angus was charged with high treason in December and in March 1522 was sent practically a prisoner to France, whence he succeeded in escaping to London in 1524.

== Lord of the Articles ==
He returned to Scotland in November with promises of support from Henry VIII, with whom he made a close alliance. Margaret, however, refused to have anything to do with her husband. On the 23rd, therefore, Angus forced his way into Edinburgh, but was fired upon by Margaret and retreated to Tantallon Castle.

He now organized a large party of nobles against Margaret with the support of Henry VIII, and, in February 1525, they entered Edinburgh and called a parliament. Angus was made a Lord of the Articles, was included in the Council of regency, bore the king's crown on the opening of the session, and with Archbishop Beaton held the chief power.

== Treaty of Berwick (1526) ==
Angus was appointed Lord Warden of the Marches in 1526, and suppressed the disorder and anarchy on the border. He had contracted a treaty for three years of peace with England on 10 October 1525 at Berwick upon Tweed, but was unable to return to Berwick to exchange papers as arranged on 13 January 1526 because he had to deal with his political opponents at Linlithgow. Instead, he sent a delegation of commissioners including Adam Otterburn to Berwick to conclude the treaty.

The terms of the treaty included abstinence from war, safe-conducts for legitimate travellers, redress for cross-border robbery and rendition of criminals. Trade by sea was assured according to the previous treaty made by Edward IV and James III in 1464. Among the provisions was the traditional clause, that neither side should dismantle or rebuild the fishgarth, where the River Esk meets the Solway. A new clause addressed the issue of border people robbing trees and timber from across the marches. It was hoped that during the three years Scottish commissioners would come to London to negotiate a new treaty of Perpetual Peace. Henry VIII signed on 17 August.

== King's keeper ==
In July 1526 the guardianship of the King James V was entrusted to him for a fixed period till 1 November, but he refused at its close to retire, and advancing to Linlithgow put to flight Margaret and his opponents.

He now with his followers engrossed all the power, succeeded in gaining over some of his antagonists, including Arran and the Hamiltons, and filled the public offices with Douglases, he himself becoming Chancellor. According to the chronicle of Robert Lindsay of Pitscottie, "None that time durst strive against a Douglas nor Douglas's man".

== Counsel of King James ==
The young king James V, now fourteen, was far from content under the tutelage of Angus, but he was closely guarded, and several attempts to free him were foiled. Angus defeated John Stewart, 3rd Earl of Lennox, who had advanced towards Edinburgh with 10,000 men in August at the Battle of Linlithgow Bridge, and he subsequently took Stirling. After his military successes, he reconciled with Beaton, and in 1527 and 1528 was busy in restoring order through the country.

On 11 March 1528, Margaret succeeded in obtaining her divorce from Angus, and about the end of the month she and her lover, Henry Stewart, were besieged at Stirling. A few weeks later, however, James escaped from Angus's custody, took refuge with Margaret and Arran at Stirling, and immediately took revenge by proscribing Angus and all the Douglases, forbidding them to come within seven miles of his person.

This did not include his half-sister, Margaret, who James, even at sixteen, could see was innocent and was allowed to be with them - though, as she was in England, the twosome would never actually meet.

== Alliance with and exile in England ==
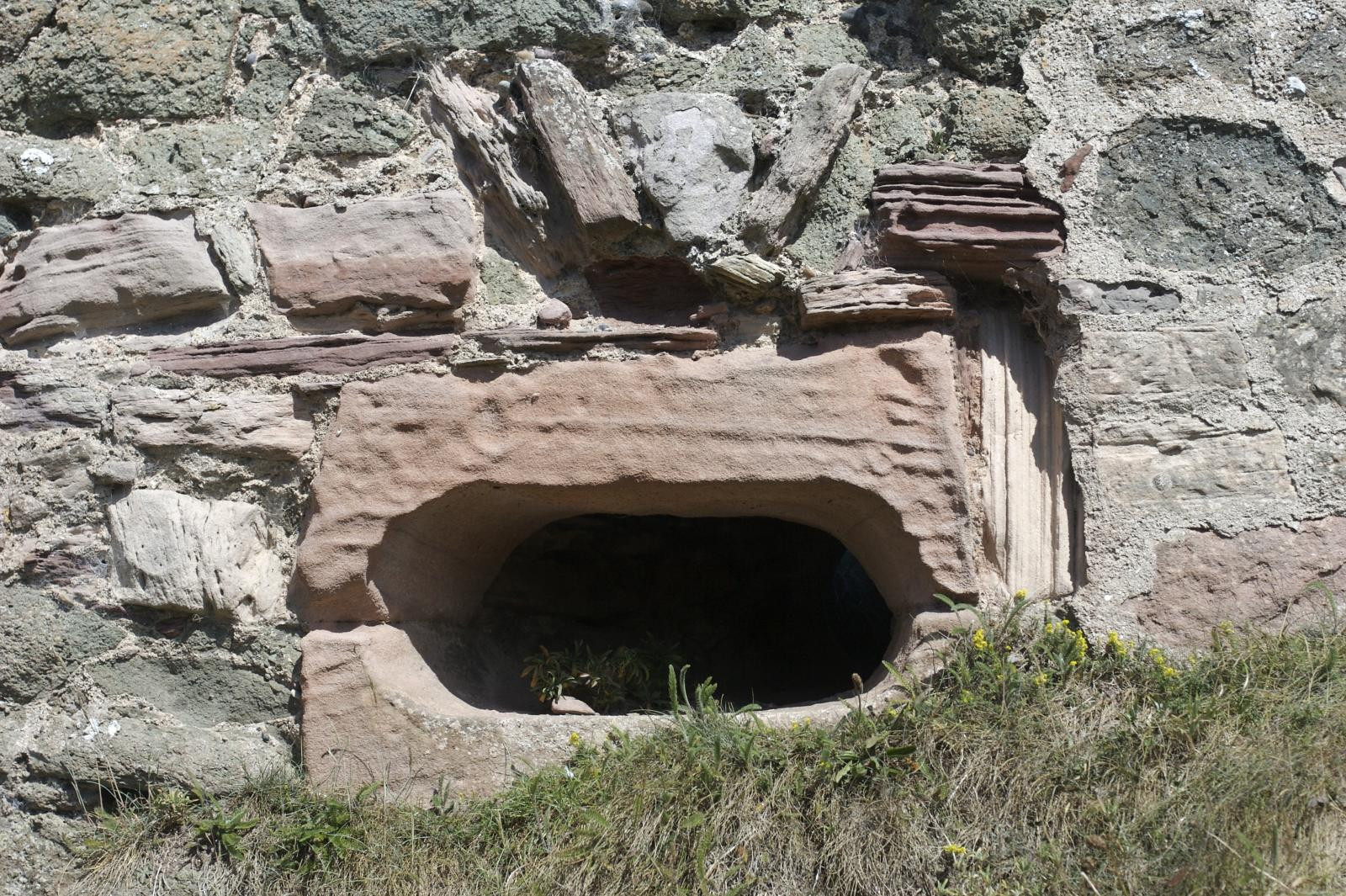
Angus added gunloops for artillery at Tantallon Castle

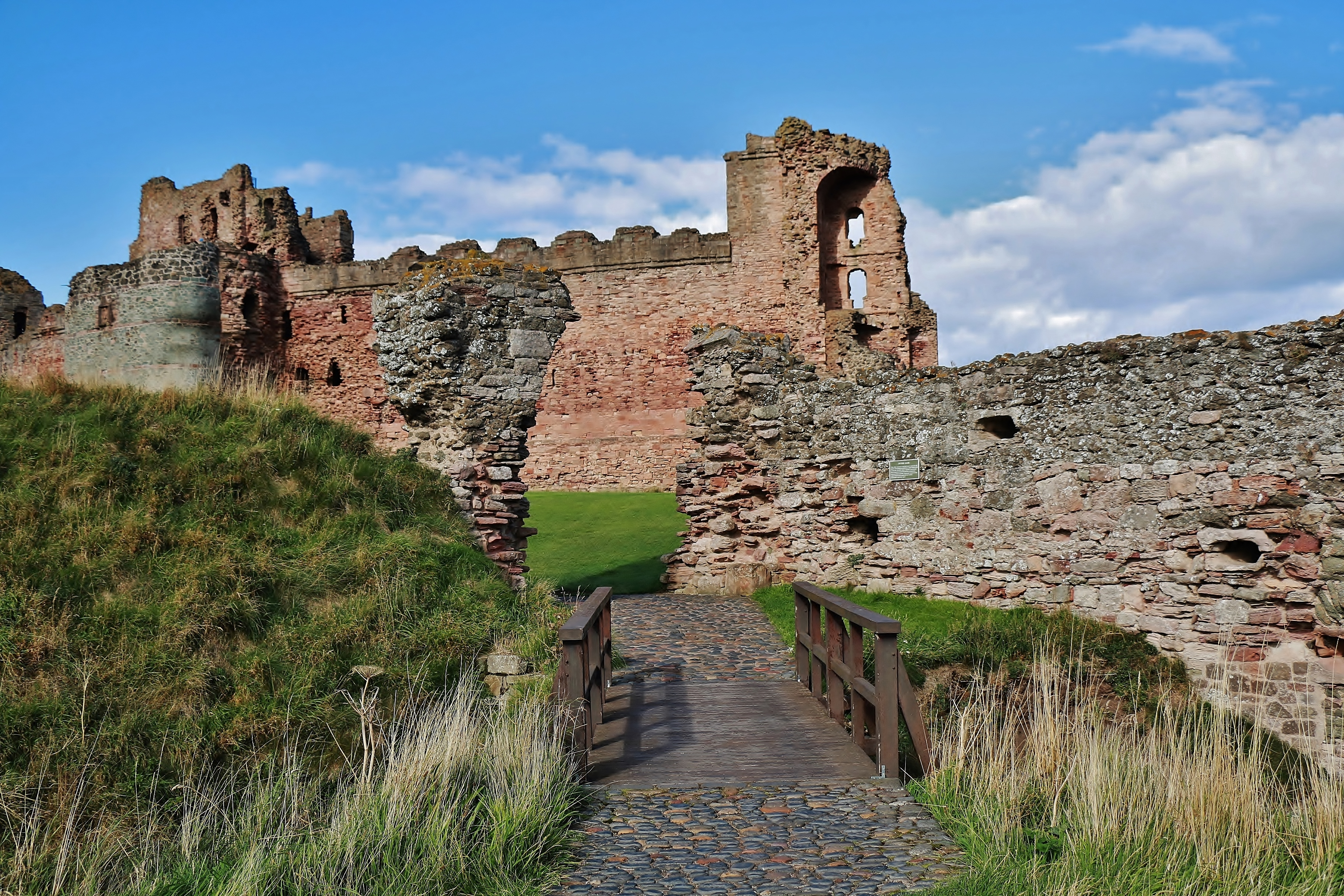
Artillery gunloops covered the outer gate at Tantallon

Angus, having fortified Tantallon, was attainted and his lands confiscated. Repeated attempts by James to subdue the fortress by siege failed, and on one occasion Angus's men captured the royal artillery. Angus based himself at Coldingham Priory. At length, Tantallon was given up as a condition of a truce between England and Scotland, and in May 1529, he sought refuge with his brother-in-law, Henry VIII in England. He obtained a pension and took an oath of allegiance, with Henry's promise to make his restoration a condition of peace.

Angus had been largely guided in his intrigues with England by his brother, Sir George Douglas of Pittendreich, Master of Angus, (died 1552), a far more clever diplomat than himself. George's life and lands were also declared forfeit, as were those of his uncle, Archibald Douglas of Kilspindie (died 1535), known by the nickname of Greysteil, who had been a friend of King James. These men fled into exile.

James avenged himself on such Douglases remaining in Scotland as he could. Angus's third sister Janet, Lady Glamis, was summoned to answer a charge of communicating with her brothers, and when she failed to appear, her estates were forfeited. In 1537, she was tried for conspiring against the king's life. She was found guilty and burnt on the Castle Hill, Edinburgh on 17 July 1537. Her innocence has been generally assumed, but the historian Patrick Fraser Tytler considered her guilty. In 1540, James Hamilton of Finnart was executed for conspiring with the Douglases to assassinate James in 1528.

Angus remained in England until 1542, joining in the attacks upon his countrymen on the border, while James refused all demands from Henry VIII for his restoration, and kept firm to his policy of suppressing the Douglas faction. However, despite his remaining in England and the fact that he was her father, Henry VIII kept guardianship of Douglas's daughter, Margaret, who was raised in the royal household.

== Return to Scotland ==
On James V's death in 1542, Angus returned to Scotland, with instructions from Henry to negotiate a marriage between Mary, Queen of Scots, and Edward, Prince of Wales. His forfeiture was rescinded, his estates restored and he was made a privy councillor and lieutenant-general.

In 1543, he successfully negotiated a peace treaty and the marriage, and the same year he married Margaret, daughter of Robert Maxwell, 5th Lord Maxwell. Shortly afterwards, a struggle between Angus and the regent Arran broke out, and in April 1544 Angus was captured and imprisoned in Blackness Castle.

== Break with England ==
The same year Lord Hertford's marauding expedition, which did not spare the lands of Angus, made him join the anti-English party. Angus was released from ward when Hertford's army landed at Granton near Edinburgh. Angus made a bond with Arran and others to maintain their allegiance to Mary, and gave his support to the mission sent to France to offer the latter's hand to the Dauphin. In July 1544 he was appointed lieutenant of the south of Scotland, and distinguished himself on 27 February 1545 in the victory over the English at Ancrum Moor. Following this victory, Angus was invested with the insignia of a Knight of the Order of St Michael by Francis II of France.

He still corresponded with Henry VIII, but nevertheless signed in 1546 the act cancelling the marriage and peace treaty, and on 10 September 1547 commanded the van in the great defeat of Scotland at Pinkie, when he again won fame. Early in October 1547, Angus tried to recapture the island of Inchcolm from the English with five ships. However, he kept up a secret correspondence with Andrew Dudley, the English commander at Broughty Castle, and wrote that he had made excuses to Regent Arran and prevented his retainers from joining the siege of Broughty.

In February 1548 an attempt to capture him and punish him for his duplicity failed. His son-in-law, the Earl of Lennox, and the English border warden Thomas Wharton marched from Dumfries to intercept Angus at Drumlanrig Castle. Angus surprised and cut off a part of the force led by Wharton's son Henry while they were burning Durisdeer. Wharton claimed that when his forces were reunited they killed 500 men, some drowned in the Nith. Meanwhile, his stores at Dumfries were robbed and spoiled, and he was driven back to Annan and back to Carlisle.

Angus escaped his English would-be captors again after the capture of Dalkeith Palace by Grey of Wilton in June 1548. He sailed from Tantallon Castle to Edinburgh, while George Douglas of Pittendreich escaped by a secret way with only a single companion.

== Death ==
Under the regency of queen Mary of Guise his restless and ambitious character and the number of his retainers gave cause for frequent alarms to the government. On 31 August 1547 he resigned his earldom, obtaining a re-grant, sibi et suis haeredibus masculis et suis assignatis quibuscumque ("to him and his male heirs and their assignees whomsoever").

His career was a long struggle for power and for the interests of his family, to which national considerations were completely subordinate. He died in January 1557 at Tantallon Castle, Scotland, from erysipelas. He was buried at Abernethy, Perthshire, Scotland.

== Children and royal grandchild ==
He and Margaret Tudor had Margaret, their only surviving legitimate child, who married Matthew Stewart, 4th Earl of Lennox, and was the mother of Henry Stuart, Lord Darnley, the second husband of Mary, Queen of Scots.

Angus outlived his illegitimate daughter Janet Douglas, who died around 1552. Janet had married Patrick Ruthven, 3rd Lord Ruthven, and produced several children and the main Ruthven line. Angus also had an illegitimate son George Douglas, who became Bishop of Moray.

Since his only legitimate son, James Douglas, by his wife Margaret Maxwell died young, he was succeeded by his nephew David, the son of George Douglas of Pittendreich.

== In popular culture ==
- Angus is the subject of the ballad, Archibald Douglas, written by Theodor Fontane in 1854, and most famously set to music by Carl Loewe.
- He is played by Andrew Rothney in the TV miniseries "The Spanish Princess."

== Ancestry ==
Ancestors of Archibald Douglas, 6th Earl of Angus

8. George Douglas, 4th Earl of Angus
4. Archibald Douglas, 5th Earl of Angus
9. Isabel Sibbald
2. George Douglas, Master of Angus
10. Robert Boyd, 1st Lord Boyd
5. Elizabeth Boyd
11. Mariota Maxwell
1. Archibald Douglas, 6th Earl of Angus
12. Malcolm Drummond
6. John Drummond, 1st Lord Drummond
13. Mariota Murray
3. Elizabeth Drummond
14. Alexander Lindsay, 4th Earl of Crawford
7. Elizabeth Lindsay
15. Margaret Dunbar

Peerage of Scotland
| Preceded by Archibald Douglas | Earl of Angus; 1514–1557 | Succeeded by David Douglas |
Political offices
| Preceded by James Beaton | Lord Chancellor of Scotland; 1526–1528 | Succeeded by Gavin Dunbar |
