= Paul Grebner =

German school teacher

Paul Grebner (Latin: Grebnerus) (fl. 1560–1590) was a German schoolteacher, and writer of a celebrated prophecy. His predictions about a great northern monarch proved acceptable in England and Scotland. Grebner's prophecies were modelled on Paracelsus.

== Life ==
Grebner was born at Schneeberg, Saxony, probably between 1530 and 1550. In 1573, he was teaching at the Michaelisschule in Lüneburg; and on 23 June, by his own account, the political future of Europe was revealed to him in a vision.

From then on, Grebner concentrated on prophecy and took up residence in Magdeburg. He intended the first copy of his work for Eric II, Duke of Brunswick-Lüneburg. On the way to see Augustus, Elector of Saxony, he was not far from Dresden when it came to him that he ought to write about the new star SN 1572 (Tycho's Supernova).

In 1582, Grebner was in England and presented Elizabeth I with a manuscript copy of his major work, Sericum Mundi filum. It went to the library of Trinity College, Cambridge, where it remains. There is some evidence that the French diplomat Jacques de Ségur-Pardaillan knew the prophecies a few years later. Grebner probably died in Hamburg.

== Works ==
- Canticum canticorum Solomon, et Threni Hieremiae Prophetae elegiaco carmine Redditi. Accessit Oda de coniunctione fidelium cum Jesus Christ, Antwerp 1563. Its author is given as "Paul Grebnerus Junior Mysnensis Niuimontanus", who dedicated the work to Augustus, Elector of Saxony.
- Sericum Mundi filum, expanded version of a work offered to the Duke of Brunswick in 1574.

== Influence ==
The writings of Grebner were a major source for the "leonine prophecies", involving an anti-papal "Lion of the North". They were applied to Gustavus Adolphus, and, in other contexts, to the Scottish lion and the House of Stuart.

=== In Germany ===
Grebner's prophecy was not generally known to German speakers until 1619, with the printing of his Conjecturen, predicting the New Jerusalem in 1624. With its vision of Antichrist destroyed and universal monarchy, it was printed in the second edition (1625) of the Confessio Fraternitatis, a basic Rosicrucian document. A pamphlet Prognosticon (1631) is an explanation of the Great Comet of 1618, attributed to Paul Gräbner of Magdeburg. It was taken from a manuscript of the Sericum Mundi filum, with 1620 substituted for the year 1573 of the original.

=== In England ===
Much notice was taken of "Grebner's prophecy" in English publications of the middle decades of the 17th century. Joseph Mede was able to consult the manuscript in Cambridge. In 1649, George Wither wrote about it, using the pseudonym "Palaemon", in Vaticinium Votivum, with royalist elegies.

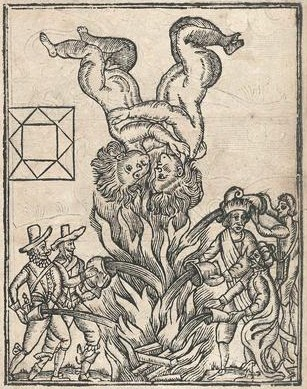
Illustration from Monarchy or no Monarchy in England. Grebner his Prophecy concerning Charles Son of Charles... English, Latin, Saxon, Scottish and Welch Prophecies concerning England in particular, and all Europe in general (1651), by William Lilly

In the Interregnum, the Grebner prophecy was much contested, particularly by William Lilly, and was adopted by Fifth Monarchists. A brief description of the future history of Europe (1650) claimed to be based on the manuscript. It made specific predictions, such as the ruin of "Rome" around 1666, and that the Fifth Monarchy would be founded in America.

Lilly's 1651 Monarchy or No Monarchy was mainly designed to undermine the royalist interpretation. It collected up interpretations: for example, one against the Presbyterian view, and also traditional Scottish prophecy, in Thomas of Ercildoune and the "prophecy of Waldhave" (published in 1613 by Andro Hart). The tenor of Lilly's work was that Charles I was the last King of England. The anonymous Visions and Prophecies concerning England, Scotland, and Ireland, of Ezekiel Grebner (1660) was a parody by Abraham Cowley, turning the prophecy and the praise of Andrew Marvell against Oliver Cromwell.

James Howell cites Grebner in the Introduction to his Lexicon Tetraglotton (1660). The 1680 work of Israel Tonge, The Northern Star the British Monarchy, drew on Grebner among other sources.
