= Sport in Germany =

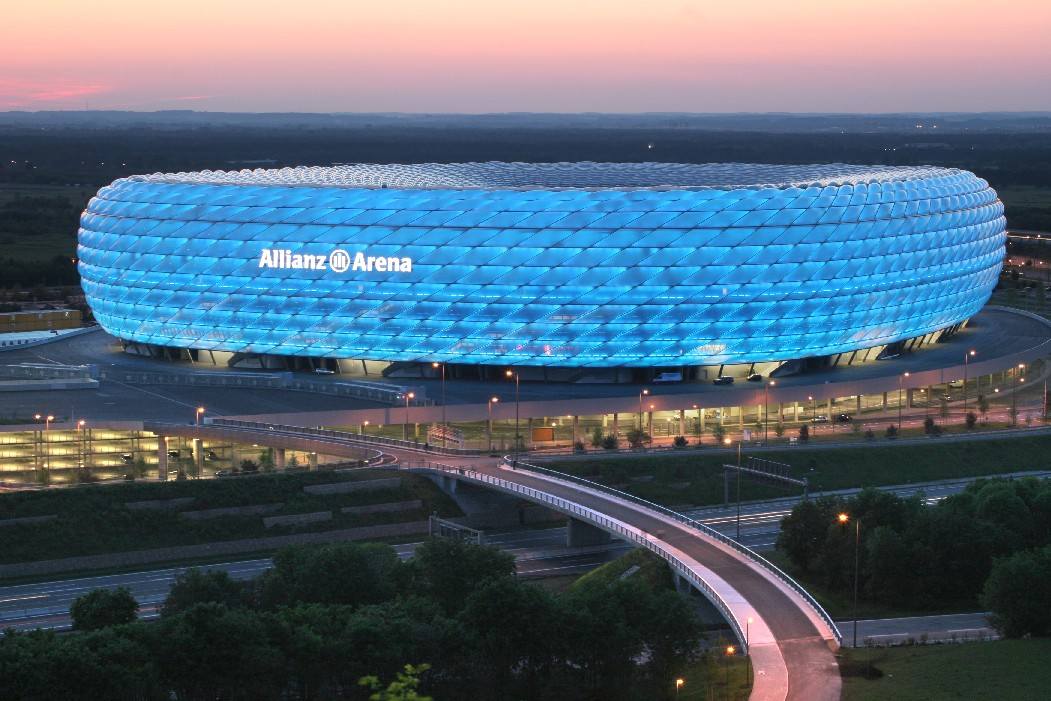
Allianz Arena in Munich, venue for the 2006 FIFA World Cup and UEFA Euro 2024 opening games

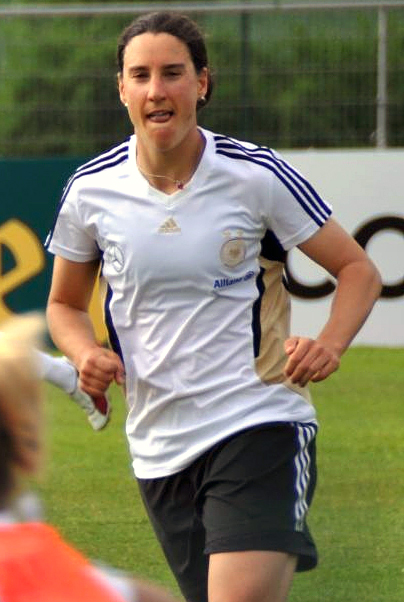
Birgit Prinz - forward and one of Germany's greatest footballers, Prinz won two FIFA Women's World Cup titles and was named FIFA World Player of the Year three times.

Sport in Germany is an important part of German culture and their society. In 2006, about 28 million people were members of the more than 87,000 sport clubs in Germany. Almost all sports clubs are represented by the German Olympic Sports Federation.

In several sports, both individual and team, Germany has good representation and many success stories. The most popular sport in Germany is football. Germany's national football team is one of the world's most successful teams with four FIFA World Cup victories (1954, 1974, 1990 and 2014) and three UEFA Euro victories (1972, 1980 and 1996). German clubs have won 32 major European trophies, making Germany the fourth most successful country in European football. Germany's top-flight club football league is named Bundesliga and is followed by millions of fans around the world.

Other popular team sports in Germany include basketball, tennis, motorsport and handball. Germany's male and female national handball teams are often featured among the world's best, while the Handball-Bundesliga is seen as one of the elite leagues of Europe. The German national basketball team's best results were gold in 1993, silver in 2005, and bronze in 2022. Germany have made seven appearances at the FIBA World Cup, winning gold in 2023, and bronze in 2002. At the Olympic Games, in Germany's seven appearances, their top performance is their fourth-place finish in 2024. The Basketball Bundesliga is widely considered one of the most competitive in Europe.

Germany has a long and successful tradition in individual sports as well. Tennis has a long history in the country with a German, Gottfried von Cramm, being the first non-American, British, Australian or French Grand Slam tournament singles winner, along with fencing, shooting and boxing. Winter sports are also widespread in Germany, and the country is a popular international skiing destination, known for its ski resorts. German skiers achieved good results in Winter Olympic Games and Alpine Ski World Cup, while German athletes won the most gold medals at the Olympics in Biathlon. Motorsports is also extremely popular in Germany with racing teams like Mercedes and Audi and race drivers like Michael Schumacher and Sebastian Vettel.

Historically, Germany has been very successful in the Olympic Games, taking part from the first Olympiad and most Games out of 48. German athletes have won 1,419 medals at the Summer Olympic Games, and another 435 at the Winter Olympic Games, for a combined total of 1,854 medals, which makes them the second most successful nation in Olympic history for total medals. The country hosted one Winter Olympics, in 1936, and two Summer Olympics, in 1936 and 1972.

== Participation by sport ==
This list was published by German Olympic Sports Confederation in 2023.

#	Sport	Participants	National teams	Details
1	Football (including futsal)	7,364,775	Germany national football team Germany women's national football team Futsal	Football in Germany
2	Gymnastics (including physical education)	4,785,707		
3	Tennis	1,475,131	Davis Cup team Fed Cup team	Tennis in Germany
4	German Alpine Club	1,406,952		
5	German Shooting and Archery Federation	1,319,794		
6	German Athletics Association (including road running)	775,733		Athletics in Germany
7	German Handball Association	736,736	Germany men's national handball team Germany women's national handball team	Handball in Germany
8	Golf	682,942		
9	German Equestrian Federation	663,145		
10	German Life Saving Association	578,834		

== History ==
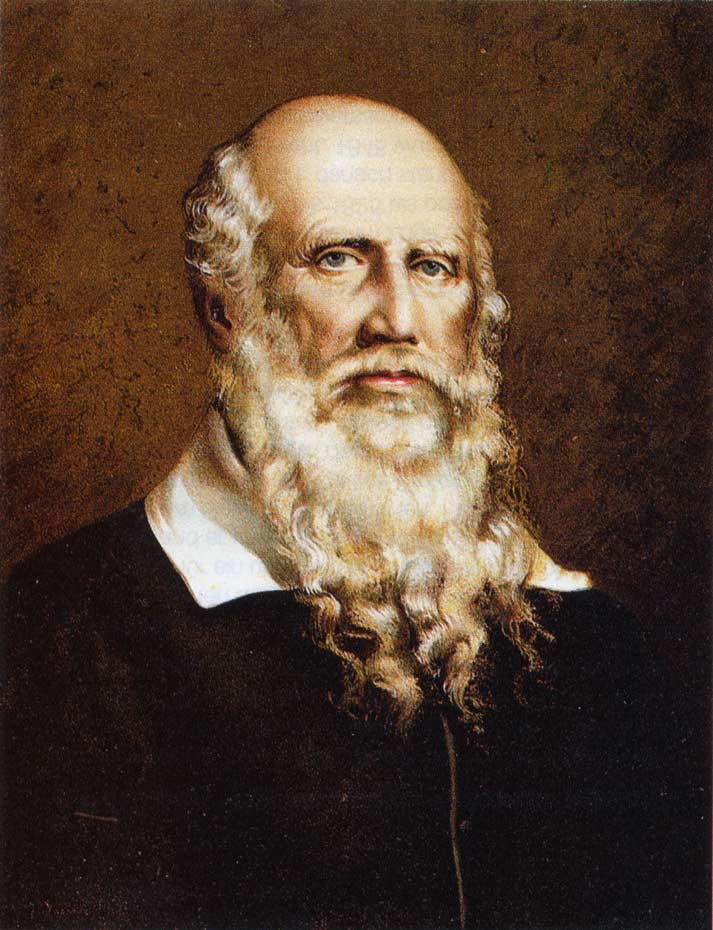
Friedrich Ludwig Jahn

Friedrich Ludwig Jahn known as Turnvater Jahn (father of gymnastics) was born in 1778 and worked as an assistant teacher in Berlin. At Berlin's Hasenheide Friedrich Ludwig Jahn opened the first German gymnastics field ('Turnplatz'), or open-air gymnasium, in spring 1811. His activities were particularly pointed at the youth, with whom he went to the gym field in free afternoons. The German gymnastics, understood by Jahn as a whole of the physical exercises.

Jahn developed well-known gymnastic equipment, invented also new apparatuses. Jahn invented the parallel bars, rings, high bar, the pommel horse and the vault horse. Particularly by his main writing "Die Deutsche Turnkunst" (1816) the apparatus gymnastics developed to an independent kind of sport, and so the gym activities were not only limited to simple physical exercises, which he quoted as following: "Going, running, jumping, throwing, carrying are free exercises, everywhere applicable, as free as fresh air."

Jahn's Turners movement, first realized at Volkspark Hasenheide in Berlin in 1811, was the origin of the modern sports clubs.

With the national gymnastics festivals in Coburg in 1860, in Berlin in 1861 and in Leipzig in 1863, the memory of Jahn's ideas returned into the people's consciousness. The inscription at the gable of his house "Frisch, Fromm, Fröhlich, Frei", translated as 'fresh, pious, cheerful, free", which originated in Jahn's time, became the basic idea of the German gymnastics movement.

In 1934, the Nazi government founded the Deutscher Reichsbund für Leibesübungen, later the Nationalsozialistischer Reichsbund für Leibesübungen, as the official sports governing body of the Third Reich. All other German sport associations gradually lost their freedom and were coopted into it. The organization was disbanded in 1945 by the American military government.

== Olympics ==
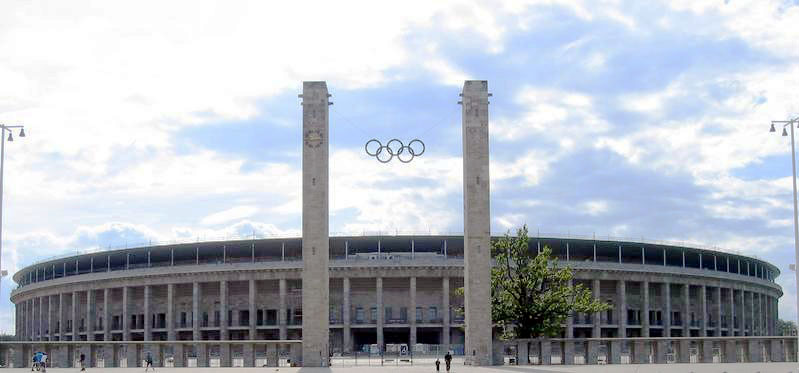
Olympiastadion Berlin

In the all-time Olympic Games medal count through 2022 Germany ranks fourth, East Germany fifteenth and West Germany twenty-third. If all the medals are combined Germany ranks second. If only winter olympic medals count, from all German states (East, West, united team and united Germany), it is the nation with the most medals.

Germany has hosted the Summer Olympic Games twice, in Berlin in 1936 and in Munich in 1972. Germany hosted the Winter Olympic Games in 1936 when they were staged in the Bavarian twin towns of Garmisch and Partenkirchen.

Germany claimed the most, if not, gold medals and the most total medals during the 1992, 1998, 2002 and 2006 Winter Olympics in Turin. East Germany claimed the most gold medals at 1984 Winter Olympics.

== Main sports ==
=== Team sports ===
==== Association football ====
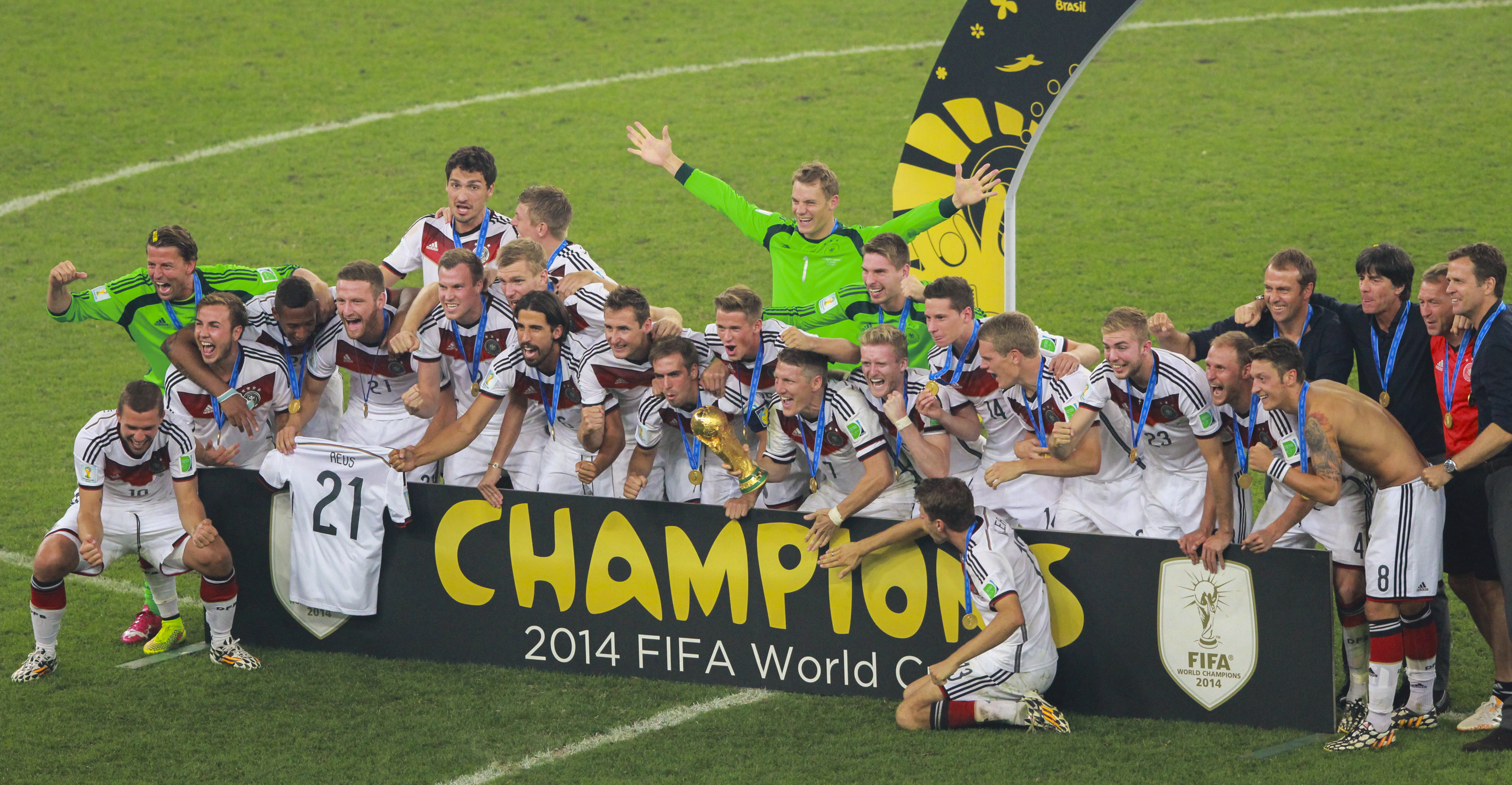
The Germany national team after winning the FIFA World Cup for the fourth time in 2014. The national sport of Germany is soccer.

Association football is the most popular sport in Germany. With a total of 26,000 clubs and 178,000 teams, German football is financed by means of state funding and state contributions, voluntary service, private sponsors and membership fees.

The Dresden English Football Club is considered the first modern football club in Germany and probably the first in continental Europe. Germany's top flight in football is the Bundesliga, which has the highest average attendances of any soccer league in the world; among all professional sports leagues, its average attendance is second only to American football's NFL. German clubs have won 32 major European trophies, making Germany the fourth most successful country in European football. As of the 2023–24 season, the Bundesliga is placed fourth in UEFA rankings, which are based on the performance of clubs in the UEFA Champions League and the UEFA Europa League.

Like in most European countries, football in Germany is the number one attended and practised sport. Besides the national league system, the FIFA World Cup and UEFA European Championship have much attention among its population.

FC Bayern Munich (German: FC Bayern München) is the most successful German football club, with 30 national championships, 20 DFB-Pokals, and 6 European championships (three European Cups and three Champions Leagues) to its credit, as well as one UEFA Cup, one European Cup Winners' Cup, two UEFA Super Cups, two FIFA Club World Cups and two Intercontinental Cups, making it one of the most successful European clubs internationally.

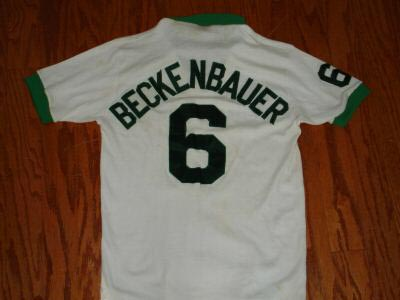
Franz Beckenbauer's Jersey in 1977

The Germany national soccer team is one of the traditional powers of international football. It won the FIFA World Cup in 1954, 1974, 1990 and 2014, being the joint-second most successful nation in the tournament only surpassed by Brazil, and the UEFA European Championship in 1972 and 1980 as West Germany hosted the UEFA Euro 1988 and in 1996 as Germany, a record (tied with Spain). The country will also host the upcoming UEFA Euro 2024. They also won the FIFA Confederations Cup in 2017. Miroslav Klose is the leading goal scorer for the national team with 71 goals and in the world cup with 16, but his fame is eclipsed by that of Franz Beckenbauer who is one of the few men in the world who have won the World Cup both as a coach and a player. Other famous German players include Fritz Walter, Gerd Müller, Rudi Völler, Jürgen Klinsmann, Oliver Kahn, Bastian Schweinsteiger, Philipp Lahm, Manuel Neuer and Thomas Müller. Germany also hosted the World Cup in 1974, which they won, and 2006, finishing third in 2006 after losing a close semi-final contest to eventual winners Italy. East Germany won gold at the 1976 Summer Olympics.

The women's national team is also a world power, with its wins of the FIFA Women's World Cup in 2003 and 2007 and a record eight UEFA European Women's Championships (1989, 1991, 1995, 1997, 2001, 2005, 2009, 2013), as well as a gold medal in the Summer Olympics in 2016. They also hosted the 1989, 1995 and 2001 UEFA European Women's Championship, and the 2011 FIFA Women's World Cup.

Germany is the only nation to win both the men's and women's competitions in the World Cups, European titles and Olympic Games gold. No country has more combined men's and women's World Cup championships, and only the United States has won more combined men's and women's regional/continental championships (United States 12 in CONCACAF, Germany 11 in UEFA).

==== Handball ====
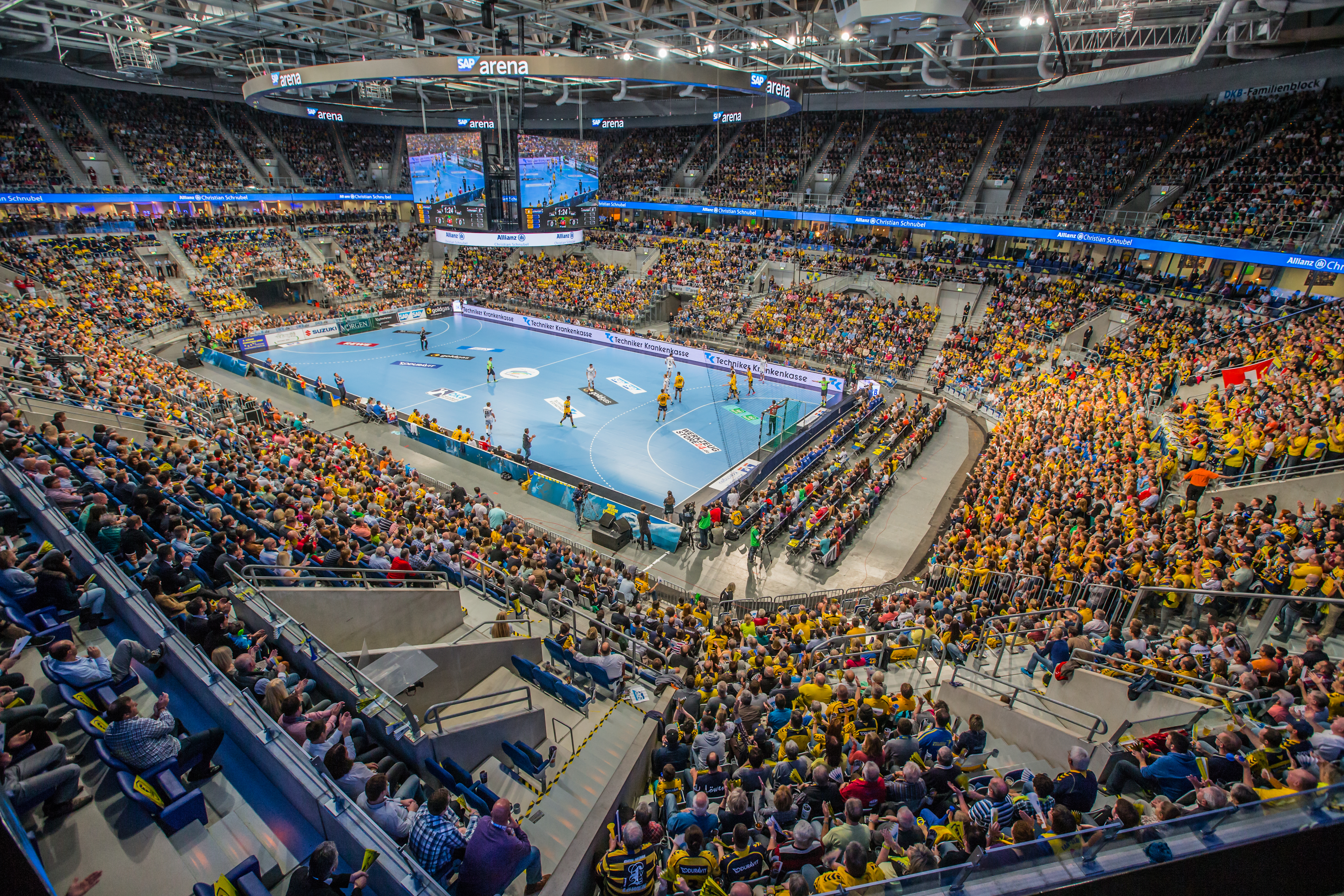
A handball game in progress at SAP Arena in Mannheim, Germany. Handball is one of the most popular team sports and historically evolved in Germany.

Germany together with Denmark is regarded as the birthplace of handball. The first match of the modern era was officially recorded on 29 October 1917 in Berlin, Germany. Carl Schelenz is credited developing most rules of modern handball. Outdoor Handball had its only Olympic Games appearance in the 1936 Berlin Olympics. The first international match recorded was played on 3 September 1925 between Germany and Austria.

Handball is widely regarded to be the second most popular team sport in Germany and when a study conducted by Repucom asked people which sport besides football they preferred a total of 33% voted handball, while basketball came in second with 25% of the votes, ice hockey got 24%, and volleyball got 11%. It is also the second-most played team sport in Germany with approximately 750,000 active registered players around the country as of 2016.

The German men's national team have won the IHF World Men's Handball Championship three times, the very first world cup in 1938, the West Germany team won it in 1978 and the united German team won it at home in 2007. They also have been crowned European champions twice first in 2004 and then in the 2016 rendition of the tournament. In the Olympic Games their efforts have resulted in one gold medal (1936), two silver medals (1984 and 2004) and one Bronze medal (2016).

The German Handball Bundesliga is considered to be the most competitive professional league in the world and several teams have won the EHF Champions League. A total of 19 times have a team from Germany won the Champions League as of 2017 which is the most out of any nation. The most successful team in Germany is by far THW Kiel which have won 23 German titles as well as 4 Champions League titles. They are the only team in German sport history to have managed to go a whole season without losing any points, this feat was achieved during the 2011–2012 season. Traditionally the teams in the league have been situated in smaller cities where the competition from football have not been so tough (Kiel and Flensburg for example), but during the 21st century more teams from larger cities have emerged such as HSV Hamburg, TSV Hannover-Burgdorf, TVB Stuttgart, SC DHfK Leipzig and Füchse Berlin. Uwe Gensheimer is a popular German handball player.

The sport attracts large television viewership; around 16 million TV viewers watched as Germany beat Poland in the 2007 World Cup as well as 13 million during the 2016 European Cup final. During the 2014–15 HBL season the game between the Rhein-Neckar Löwen and HSV Hamburg broke the world record for most spectators in a handball game with 44,189 spectators in the Commerzbank-Arena in Frankfurt beating the previous record of 36,651 spectators during the 2011 Danish league final between AG København and Bjerringbro-Silkeborg.

==== Hockey ====
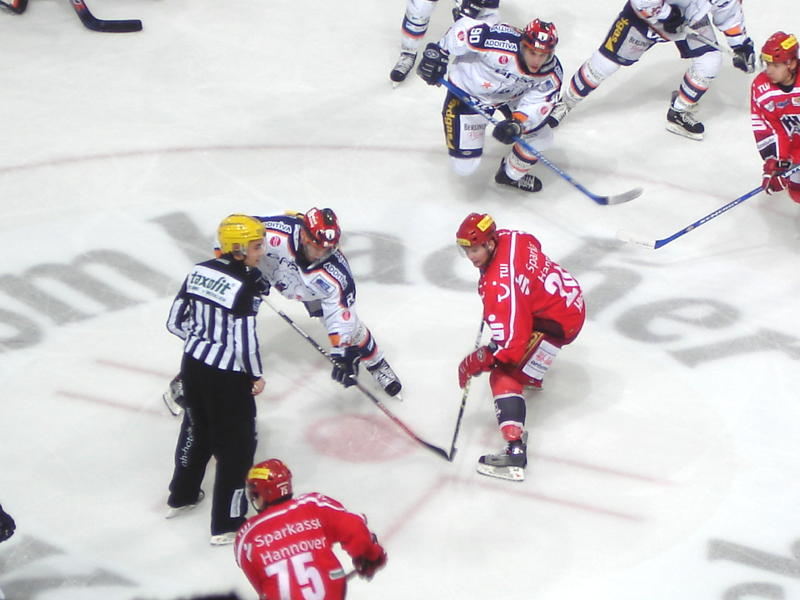
Eisbären Berlin

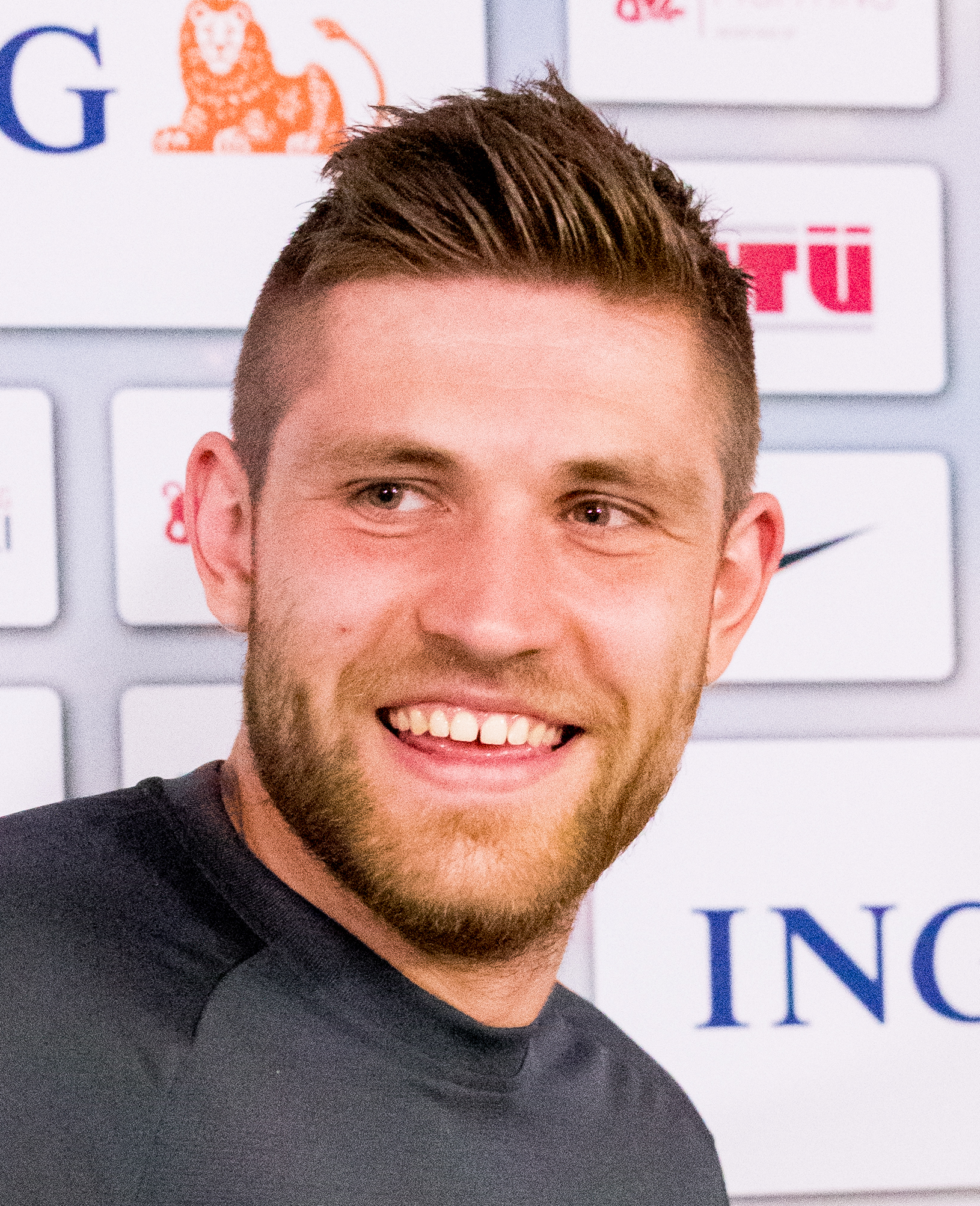
Leon Draisaitl in 2019

Hockey is one of Germany's most popular sports, although considering its importance and spectator popularity in the nation it is ranked far behind football. There are many leagues but the top one is the 14 team Deutsche Eishockey Liga. The Germany men's national ice hockey team has featured several prominent current and former NHL players, including Hart Trophy winner Leon Draisaitl, who is considered one of the best players in the world, JJ Peterka, Tim Stützle, Moritz Seider, Dominik Kahun, Christian Ehrhoff, Jochen Hecht, Dennis Seidenberg, Thomas Greiss, Marcel Goc, Philipp Grubauer and Marco Sturm and NHL prospects like Alexander Sulzer, Philip Gogulla, Lukas Reichel and Marcel Müller. The men's national team is currently ranked 8th in the world.

In 2010, Mannheim and Cologne co-hosted the Ice Hockey World Championships. Germany defeated the US in the opening game in front of a record breaking crowd of 77,803 in Gelsenkirchen's Veltins-Arena. Germany finished the tournament in fourth place, the nation's best finish since 1953. German goaltender Dennis Endras was named the tournament's top goaltender by the IIHF directors and the top goaltender and most valuable player by the media.

The most recent notable success came at the 2018 Winter Olympics and the 2023 IIHF World Championship when the national team won the silver medal both times.

==== Basketball ====
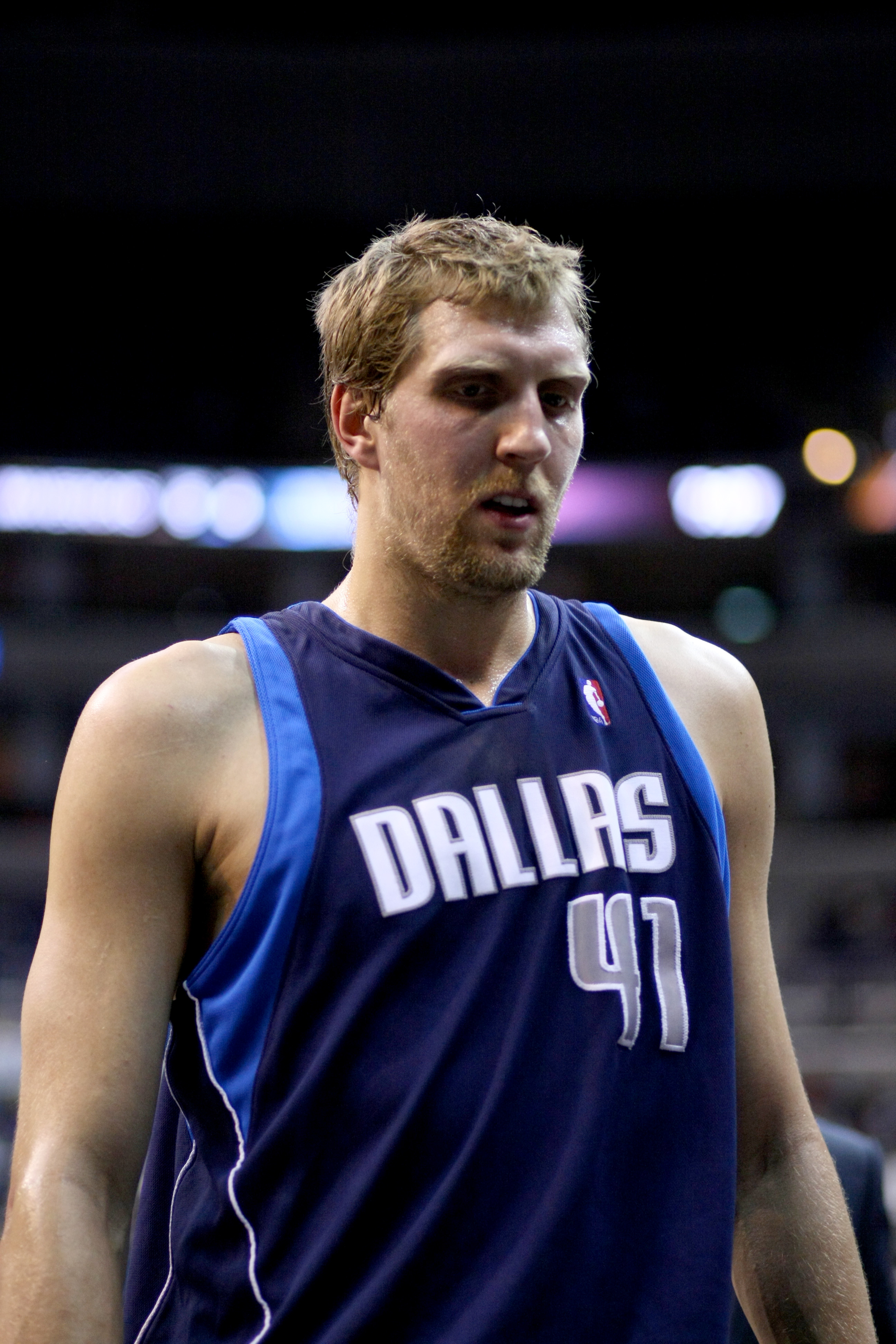
Dirk Nowitzki

Together with football, hockey and handball, basketball in Germany is among the most popular spectator sports.. The Basketball Bundesliga is the highest level league of professional club basketball in Germany.

One of the most popular non-football athletes to come out of Germany is Dirk Nowitzki, who played as power forward for the Dallas Mavericks in his 21-year career in the NBA. He was a 14-time NBA All-star and was a part of 12 All-NBA teams. In 2007, he became the first player trained totally outside the U.S. to be named league MVP, and in 2011 led the Mavericks to their first NBA title and earned a Finals MVP doing so.

The Germany national basketball team's biggest successes are the victory in the European Championship of 1993 at home in Germany, the silver medal in the 2005 European Championships, the bronze medal in the 2002 FIBA World Championship, the gold medal in the 2023 FIBA Basketball World Cup and the gold medal at the EuroBasket 2025.

=== Calendar of the major men's and women's professional sports leagues in Germany ===
January	February	March	April	May	June	July	August	September	October	November	December
Bundesliga (Football)							Bundesliga (Football)				
HBL (Handball)							HBL (Handball)				
DEL (Ice hockey)								DEL (Ice hockey)			
BBL (Basketball)								BBL (Basketball)			

January	February	March	April	May	June	July	August	September	October	November	December
Frauen-Bundesliga (Football)								Frauen-Bundesliga (Football)			
HBF (Handball)							HBF (Handball)				
DBBL (Basketball)								DBBL (Basketball)			

=== Individual sports ===
==== Athletics ====
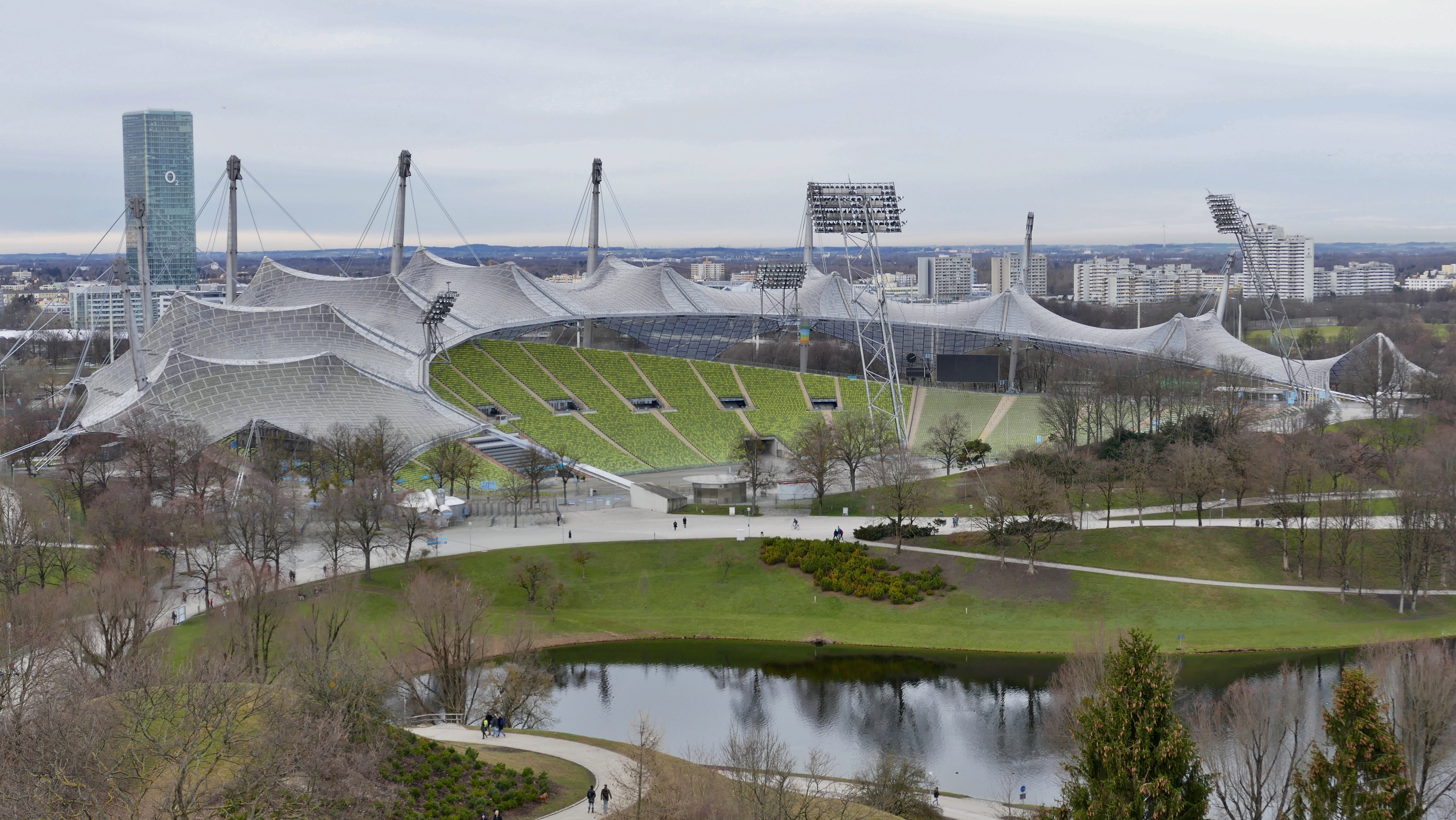
Olympiastadion in Munich, venue of the 1972 Olympic Games and the 2022 European Championships

Germany is among the most successful nations at the European Athletics Championships, the World Athletics Championships and at the Athletics at the Summer Olympics.

Among the most successful athletes are Malaika Mihambo, Franka Dietzsch, Robert Harting, Lars Riedel and Armin Hary.

==== Equestrian sports ====
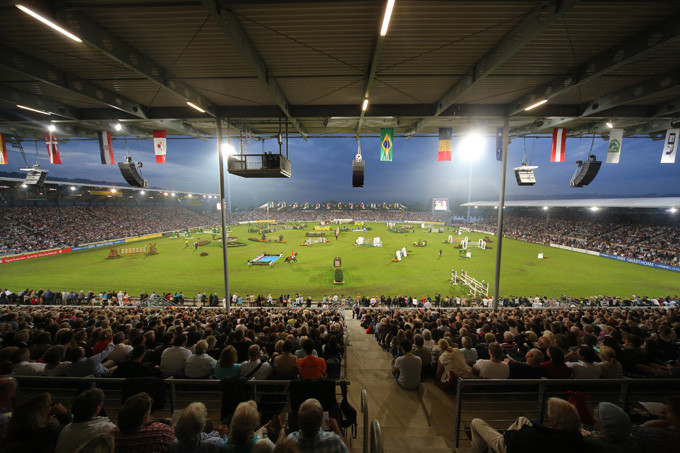
CHIO Aachen's main stadium

Germany leads the medal tables of the Olympic Games, the FEI World Equestrian Games, European Dressage Championships and the European Show Jumping Championships.

Among the most successful athletes are Isabell Werth, Reiner Klimke and Hans Günter Winkler.

The CHIO Aachen is the biggest Equestrian sporting event in the world.

==== Motorsport ====
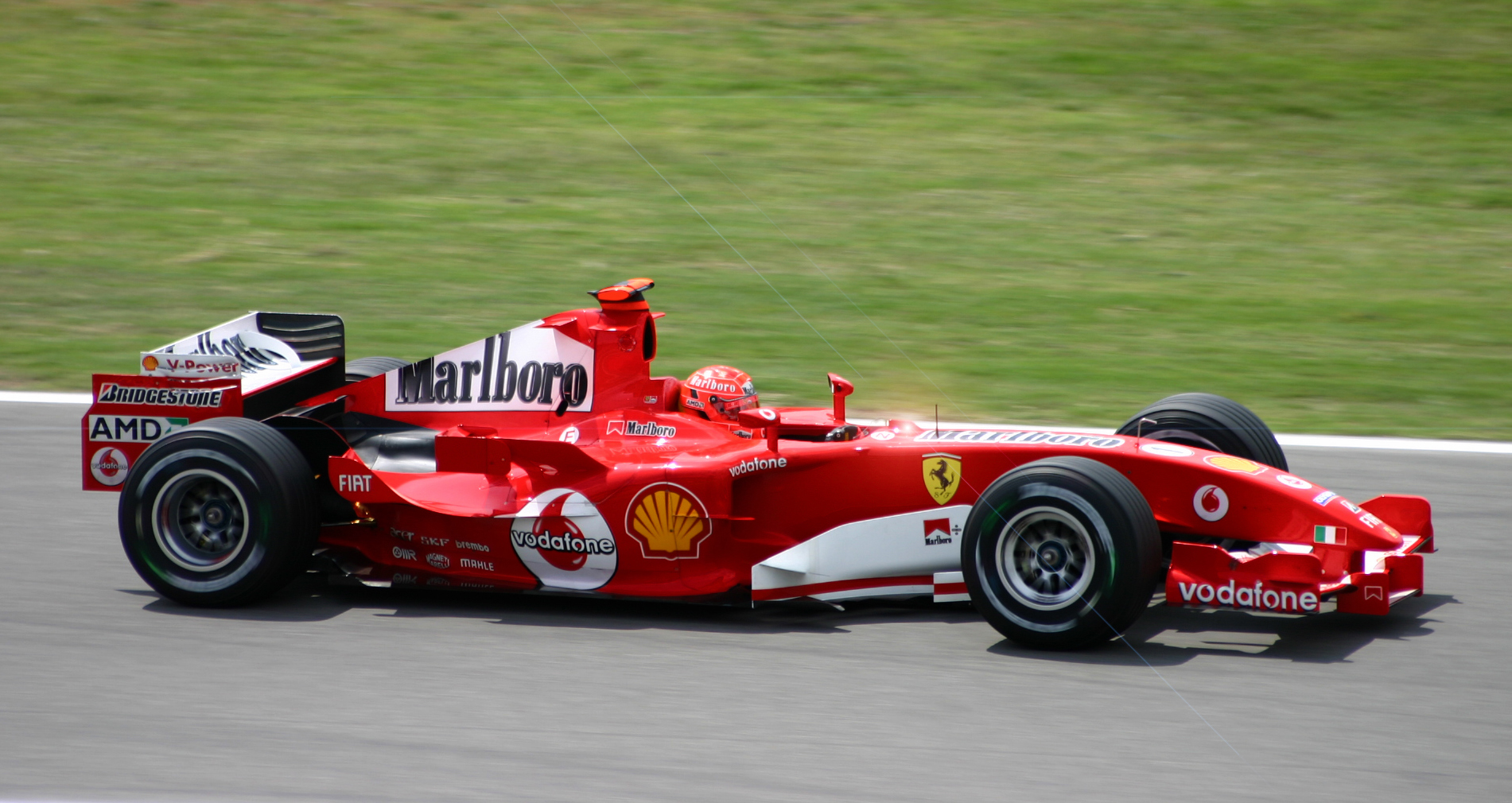
Michael Schumacher has claimed 91 race victories and 7 championships in his F1 career.

Germany is one of the leading motorsports countries in the world. While countless race winning cars have come from Germany, only Michael Schumacher, Sebastian Vettel and Nico Rosberg have been Formula One world champions (they have won 12 titles combined) and Walter Röhrl being the sole World Rally Champion from Germany (he won two titles). Jochen Rindt, who was F1 world champion in 1970, was born in Germany but raced with an Austrian licence for his whole career. One other German driver came close to winning the title: Wolfgang von Trips. He died in a crash in the last race of the season at Monza in 1961, giving the championship to his Ferrari teammate Phil Hill.

Schumacher is tied with Lewis Hamilton for the most Formula One Drivers championships with 7. In 2003, Schumacher set a new record for driver's championships when he surpassed Juan Manuel Fangio's total of 5 championships, a record that had stood for 46 years since 1957. He was also the highest paid athlete in sports history, with an annual salary of some U.S. $70 million from the Ferrari team, and an estimated $25–30 million more coming from endorsements. In 2005, he became the world's first billionaire athlete, according to Eurobusiness magazine. He is regarded as one of the greatest drivers of all time; when he first retired at the end of the 2006 season, he held 7 championships and every significant F1 record. He returned to F1 in 2010, celebrated his completion of 20 years in F1 in August 2011, and retired for a second time at the end of the 2012 season.

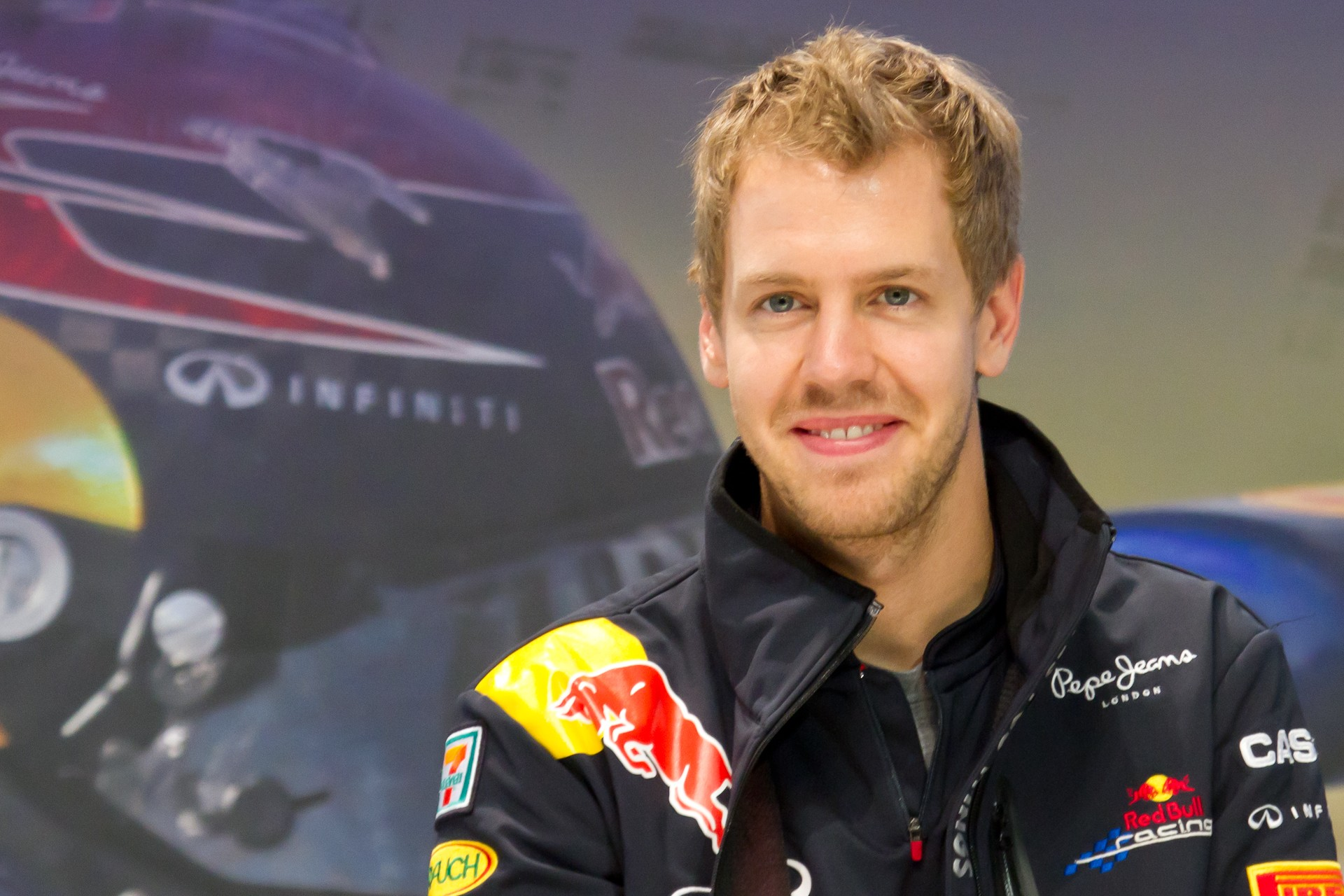
Sebastian Vettel

In 2010, Vettel became the youngest driver ever to win the world championship, he also successfully defended the title in 2011, 2012 and 2013. Before winning his first F1 drivers' championship, Vettel had already been the youngest ever to drive at a Grand Prix meeting, earn F1 world championship points, start from pole position in an F1 race, and finish as runner-up for the drivers' championship.

In 2016, Nico Rosberg became the third German driver to win the Formula One World Championship.

Mercedes-Benz has had brief but long-remembered successful period in Formula One in 1954 and 1955 and a successful sports car program from 1952 to 1955 when they stepped away from factory racing following the 1955 Le Mans disaster involving their cars, which also lead to the ban of racing in Switzerland, except for hillclimbs which are held against time instead of another competitor on track, and very few small capacity engines which basically outlaws anything larger than karts. Mercedes-Benz also supplied IndyCar in the 1990s under the CART sanctioned series and took the win in the 1994 Indianapolis 500 as the strongest engine to date in American Open Wheel Racing Series history. Their involvement in Champ Cars lasted from the end of the World Sports Car Championship in 1993 to 1998 when they focused on supplying McLaren-Mercedes in Formula 1 only, with subsequent World Driver Championship titles for Mika Häkkinen in 1998 and 1999 and the World Constructor Championship in 1998.

The DTM (Deutsche Tourenwagen Masters) has been the national touring car series. It was considered one of the best touring car series in the world. The Series has transioned from touring cars to grand touring sports cars since 2020. Many Formula 1 drivers have made the switch to the touring car series, including, Mika Häkkinen, Jean Alesi and others. From 1995, only German marques of cars were allowed to compete in the series until 2019 when Aston Martin participated for one season when Mercedes and the Affalterbach HWA Team left the touring cars series. Only Audi, BMW and Mercedes-Benz competeted for most of the 2010s, but Opel and Alfa Romeo have a history in the sport. The races are held mainly in Germany, but some races occur elsewhere in Europe with some expansion attempts into China and Japan. The races draw monster crowds and television ratings and many celebrities have attended race days.

Since 2007 the ADAC GT Masters was the premier grand touring car series which adopted GT3 early and had a sprint race format that allowed the popularization of the category and format. In 2023 the DTM adopted much of that format with their switch from touring cars to the same car regulations in 2020 and they both were organized under the ADAC as a support series to the DTM Calendar.

The former race track AVUS in Berlin was the first automobile-only road. Situated in Germany is the Nürburgring with its historical Nordschleife course. Since 1970 it is host to the annual 24 Hours Nürburgring endurance race, one of the biggest motorsports events in the world with over 200 participating teams and over 800 drivers, many of them touring car legends and veterans, among hundreds of thousands of live spectators camping along the race track.

The German Grand Prix was a staple to the Formula One Calendar for most of its history with 75 hosted events at the Nürburgring since 1927, AVUS and the Hockenheimring, which hosted since 1970 the most events following safety concerns ruled out the AVUS and Nordschleife in the 1970s.

The success of the Nürburgring 24h has led to the formation of the VLN Langstreckenmeisterschaft Nürburgring a series of shorter endurance races with a length of 3 hours or 4 hours and one 6 hours event per year forming a schedule of six to 10 events per year organized by various motorsport clubs in Germany that are organized under the ADAC or DMSB and responsible for the championship organization. The initial idea was for the series to be a production and touring car series with a mixture of professional, semi-professionals and amateur drivers to take on the Nordschleife race track at the same time, creating a unique mix of talent and background. Since 2000 there has been a rise in sports car entries, most notably Porsche giving BMW stronger competition to their touring car offerings. While much of it is privately held customer racing, there has been growing factory involvement in the series since 2003 when Opel and Audi brought their DTM machinery to the series and the subsequent years following the GT3 emerging as the top class with increasing factory support since 2009 and 2012, when BMW and Audi, followed by Mercedes-AMG in 2013, all developed winning programs, and since then many more manufacturers have taken to the series as their proving grounds, In 2020 the series was rebranded as the Nürburgring Langstrecken-Serie (NLS) with expanded international appeal and marketing.

In sports car racing, Stefan Bellof and Hans-Joachim Stuck won the World Sportscar Championship in 1984 and 1985, whilst more recently André Lotterer, Timo Bernhard and Marc Lieb won the World Endurance Championship in 2012, 2015 and 2016 respectively.

The 24 Hours of Le Mans is a prestigious annual race held in France. Porsche has won the race 16 times, far more than any other constructor. Second on the list is Audi, who have dominated the race in recent years, scoring 11 wins since their first in the year 2000. Audi driver Frank Biela was one of the most successful drivers in touring and sports cars in the 1990s and 2000s, winning the FIA World Touring Car Cup in 1995 and the Guia Race in 1996, as well as the German, French and British Touring Car titles, before winning the Le Mans 24 Hours five times and the 12 Hours of Sebring four times. Mercedes-Benz also had a return to the 24 Hours of Le Mans in 1987 and had various winning programs in the sport prototypes of the World Endurance Championship and FIA GT Championship in 1997 and 1998 but another incident at Le Mans in 1999, spelled another end to their involvement in anything but engine supplier for Formula One since 2000, but the sudden championship title success of Brawn GP in the 2009 Formula One season with Mercedes supplied engines lead to their involvement as a factory entry into F1 as Mercedes AMG F1 since 2010 when they took over their operational license. They have since supplied all of Lewis Hamiltons World Driver Championship titles and secured the majority of manufacturer titles in the second F1 turbo era since 2014.

== Winter sports ==
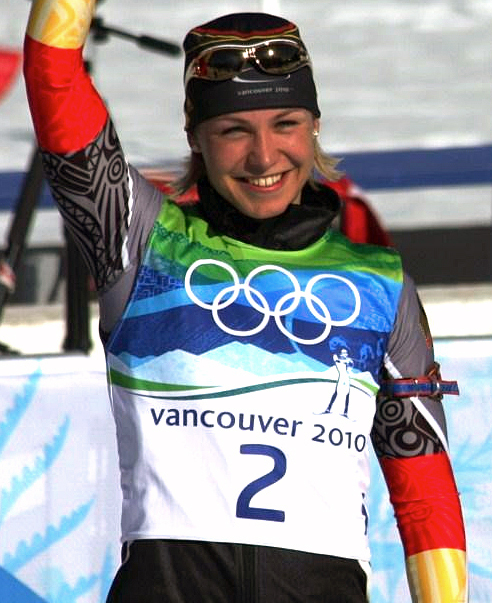
Magdalena Neuner, biathlete

Germany is one of the most successful winter sport nations. Its dominance in sledding disciplines can be attributed to it being the only country in the world to have four bobsleigh, luge, and skeleton tracks. These tracks are located in Altenberg, Königssee, Oberhof, and Winterberg.

Germany has long been dominant in the sport of Bobsledding having won more medals in the Winter Olympics than any other nation except Switzerland. However, if medal wins by East Germany and West Germany from 1949 through 1990 are combined, Germany's medal count is nearly double that of Switzerland. At the 2006 Winter Olympics in Turin, André Lange piloted both the two-man and four-man sleds to gold, sweeping the men's bobsledding events.

In luge, Germany is dominant like no other nation, stretching from luge's foundation in the early 20th century with dominance in the European championships to the Winter Olympics. Noted lugers include Georg Hackl, Klaus Bonsack, Margit Schumann, David Möller, Felix Loch, Silke Kraushaar-Pielach, Sylke Otto, Tatjana Hüfner and Natalie Geisenberger. Since the 1964 Olympic Games Germany has won 87 of 153 medals. German athletes even won 38 of 51 Olympic gold medals (75%).

In skeleton, Germany has been dominant with the likes of Kerstin Jürgens and Anja Huber.

Biathlon has become one of the most popular winter sports in Germany in recent years, and enjoys some of the highest TV ratings in Germany for any sport aside from association football. Germany has won 59 Olympic medals in biathlon, more than any other nation, and is the joint most successful nation in terms of Olympic golds won, with Germany and Russia having won 20 golds each. Some of Germany's most successful biathletes include Frank-Peter Roetsch, Michael Greis, Sven Fischer, Ricco Groß and Frank Luck among the men and Uschi Disl, Andrea Henkel, Kati Wilhelm, Magdalena Neuner and Laura Dahlmeier among the women.

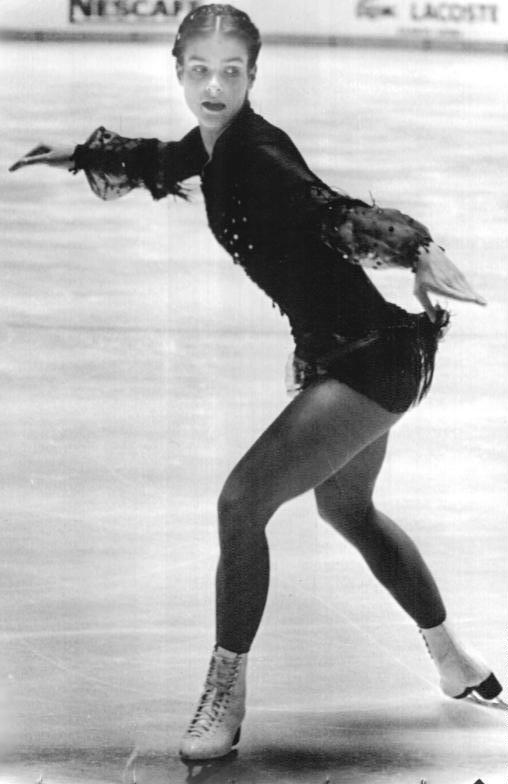
Katarina Witt in 1982

Tobias Angerer has enjoyed success in cross-country skiing, winning consecutive overall FIS Cross-Country World Cups in 2005/06 and 2006/07. Other notable cross-country skiers include Peter Schlickenrieder, Axel Teichmann and Jens Filbrich.

Along with biathlon, ski jumping is the most popular winter sport in Germany, with TV broadcasts regularly attracting five million viewers, and the country has produced a number of top jumpers. Jens Weißflog is Germany's most successful ski jumper and was one of the top competitors in the world from the mid-1980s to the mid-1990s. Other notable athletes include Hans-Georg Aschenbach, Sven Hannawald, Martin Schmitt and Severin Freund. Two of the four rounds of the prestigious Four Hills Tournament are held on German hills, at Oberstdorf and Garmisch-Partenkirchen.

German athletes have been competitive in Nordic combined. Title-winning competitors include Georg Thoma, Ulrich Wehling, Hermann Weinbuch, Ronny Ackermann and Eric Frenzel.

Germany has enjoyed great success in alpine skiing, where the most successful German alpine skiers have tended to be female. One notable male alpine skier was Markus Wasmeier. Felix Neureuther is Germany's most successful male skier in terms of World Cup race wins with 13. Rosi Mittermaier, Katja Seizinger and Maria Höfl-Riesch have won multiple world-level titles on the women's circuit.

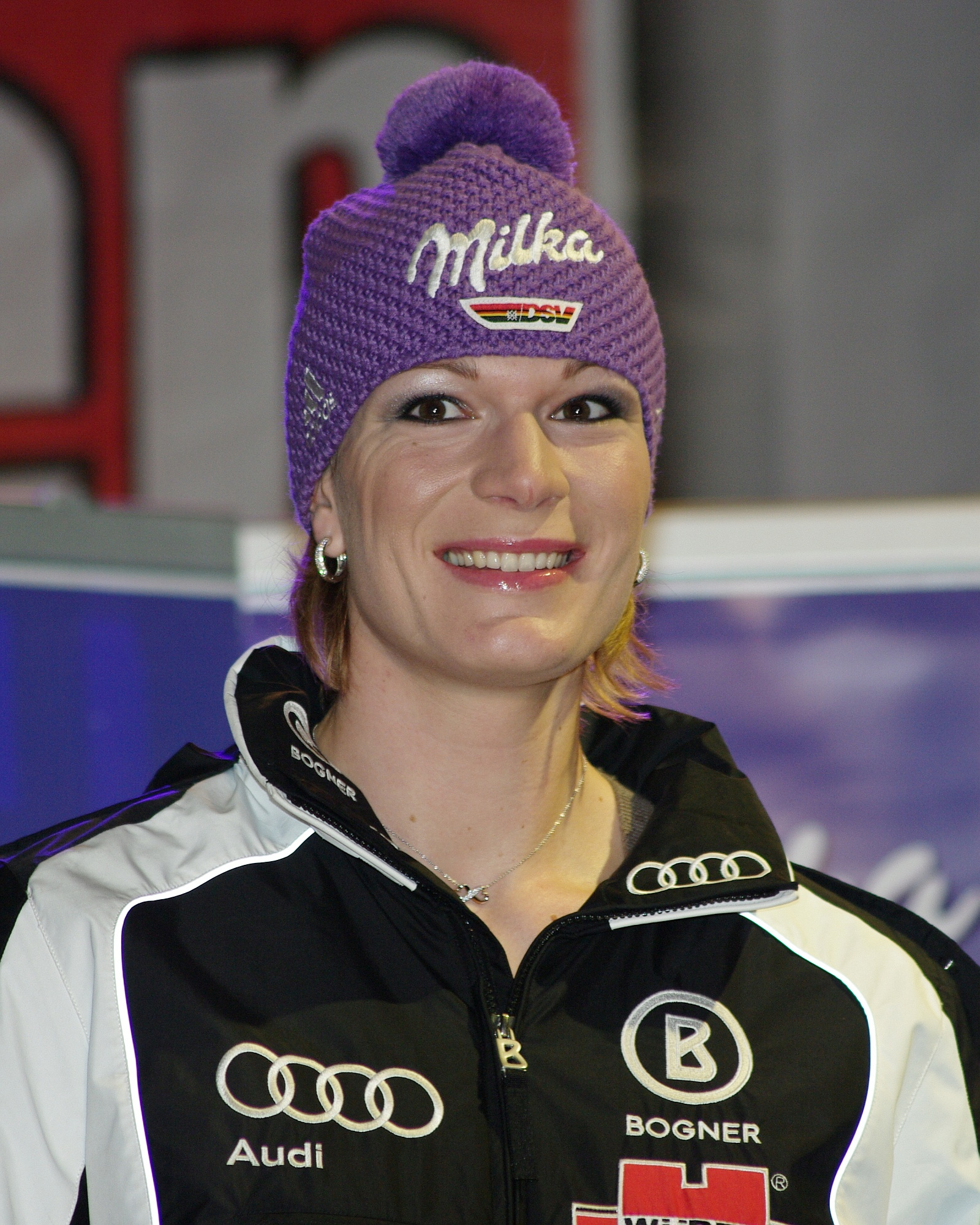
Maria Höfl-Riesch, former alpine ski racer who won multiple Olympic gold medals and World Championships. She was known for her success in slalom, super combined, and downhill events.

In speed skating Germany has been a major power, particularly in women's competition. Four of the five most prolific winners in the women's ISU Speed Skating World Cup are German – Gunda Niemann-Stirnemann, Jenny Wolf, Anni Friesinger-Postma and Monique Garbrecht-Enfeldt. Claudia Pechstein won nine Olympic medals in long track speed skating, more than any other skater, male or female. Successful male German speed skaters have included Erhard Keller and Uwe-Jens Mey. Success in short track speed skating has been harder to come by, however Tyson Heung did win the overall ISU Short Track Speed Skating World Cup in 2006/07.

Germany has a heritage in figure skating extending to the early days of international competition – Oskar Uhlig won the inaugural European Figure Skating Championships in 1891, while the first male and pairs World Champions were Gilbert Fuchs in 1896 and the pairing of Anna Hübler and Heinrich Burger in 1908 (Hübler and Burger were also the first Olympic gold medalists in pairs competition at the 1908 Games). Germany's best-known figure skater is Katarina Witt, a double Olympic gold medalist in the 1980s. Other notable German competitors include Manfred Schnelldorfer, Jan Hoffmann, Gabriele Seyfert, Anett Pötzsch and the pairings of Ria Baran and Paul Falk, Marika Kilius and Hans-Jürgen Bäumler, and Aliona Savchenko and Robin Szolkowy.

Germany has been a regular competitor in Olympic Curling since the sport was reintroduced at the 1998 Winter Olympics. The German men's and women's teams both won World Curling Championships in 1992 and 1994. A related sport, known as Eisstockschiessen or ice stock sport, is played in southern Germany.

While a minor sport in the country, Germany national bandy team has qualified for Division A of the 2017 Bandy World Championship. In terms of licensed athletes, bandy is the second biggest winter sport in the world.

== Tennis ==
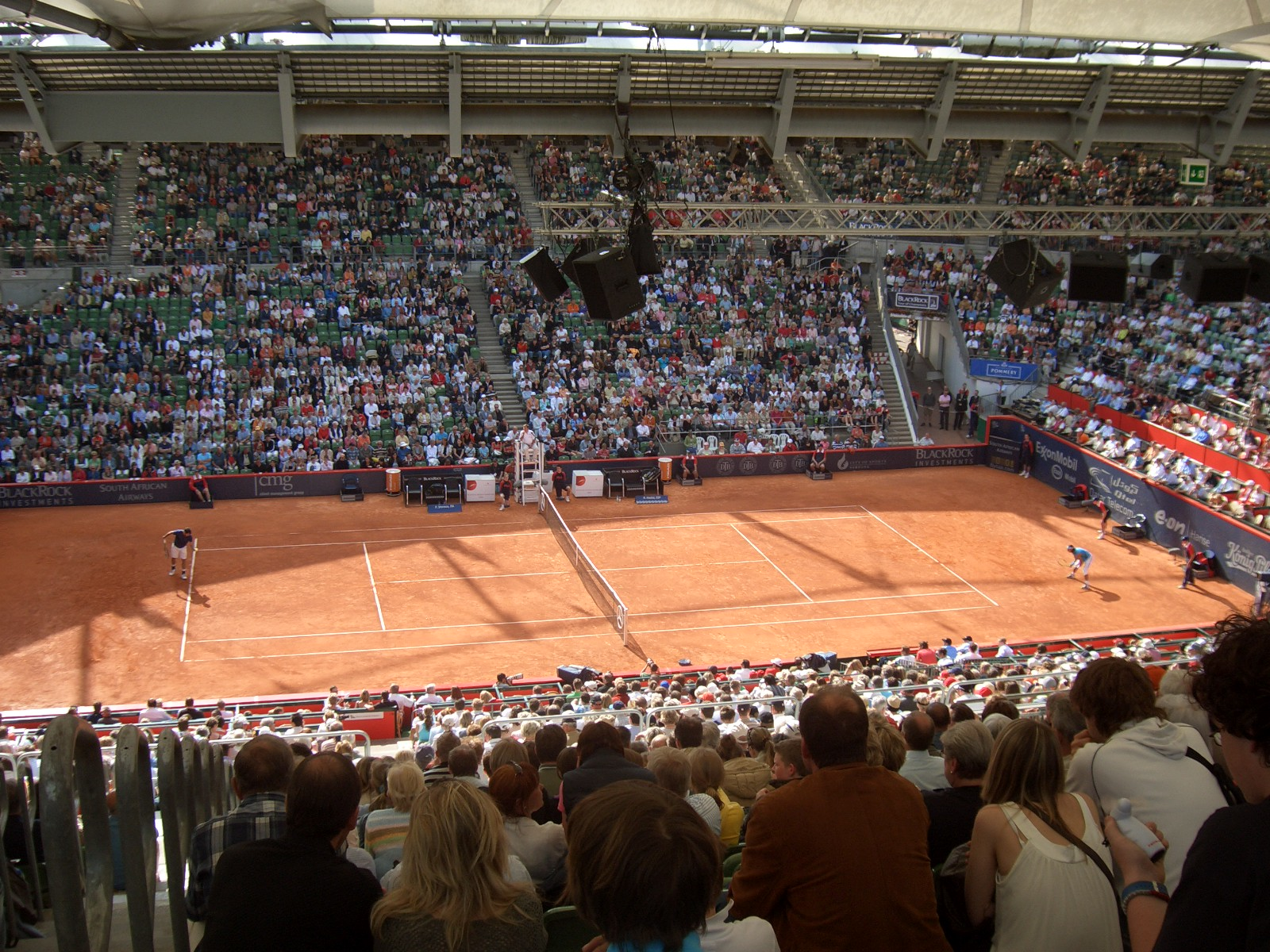
The Hamburg tennis tournament is the 5th oldest tennis tournament in the world.

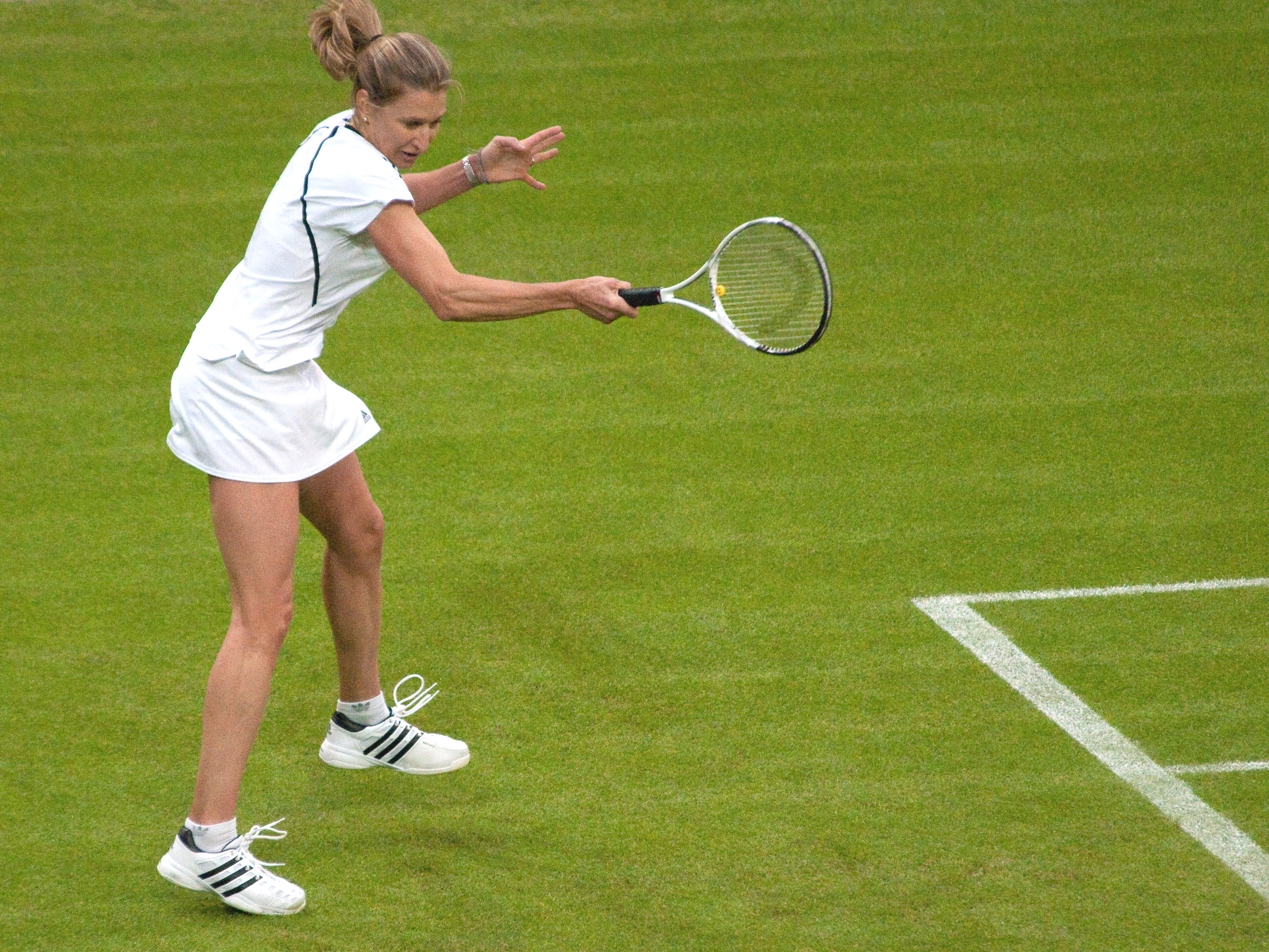
Steffi Graf dominated the sport in the late 1980s and early 1990s, winning 22 Grand Slam singles titles and achieving the calendar-year Golden Slam in 1988.

Germany won the 5th most Single Grand Slam titles and is among the 10 most successful nations regarding all Grand Slam titles combined(singles, doubles and mixed). German female tennis players won the 2nd most single titles on the WTA Tour while German male tennis players have won the 7nd most singles titles on the ATP Tour.

The two most successful German tennis players of all time are Steffi Graf and Boris Becker.

Becker became the youngest champion in the history of the men's singles at Wimbledon, won six-time Grand Slam singles titles and an Olympic gold medal together with Michael Stich.

Graf won 22 Grand Slam singles titles, second among male and female players. In 1988, she became the first and only tennis player (male or female) to achieve the Calendar Year Golden Slam by winning all four Grand Slam singles titles and the Olympic gold medal in the same calendar year.

The German Open Hamburg was part of the Grand Prix Super Series from 1978 to 1989, and the ATP Masters Series from 1990 to 2008, whereas the Eurocard Open was part of the ATP Masters Series from 1995 to 2001. The German Open Hamburg is an ATP World Tour 500 since 2009, and the Halle Open was upgraded to that category in 2015. Also, the ATP Tour World Championships and Grand Slam Cup were played in Germany from 1990 to 1999. Meanwhile, the Women's German Open in Berlin is one of the oldest tournaments for women and was a Tier I tournament from 1988 to 2008 and is a WTA 500 tournament since 2021, with the Women's Stuttgart Open a WTA Tier II / Premier tournament since 1990.

== Cycling ==
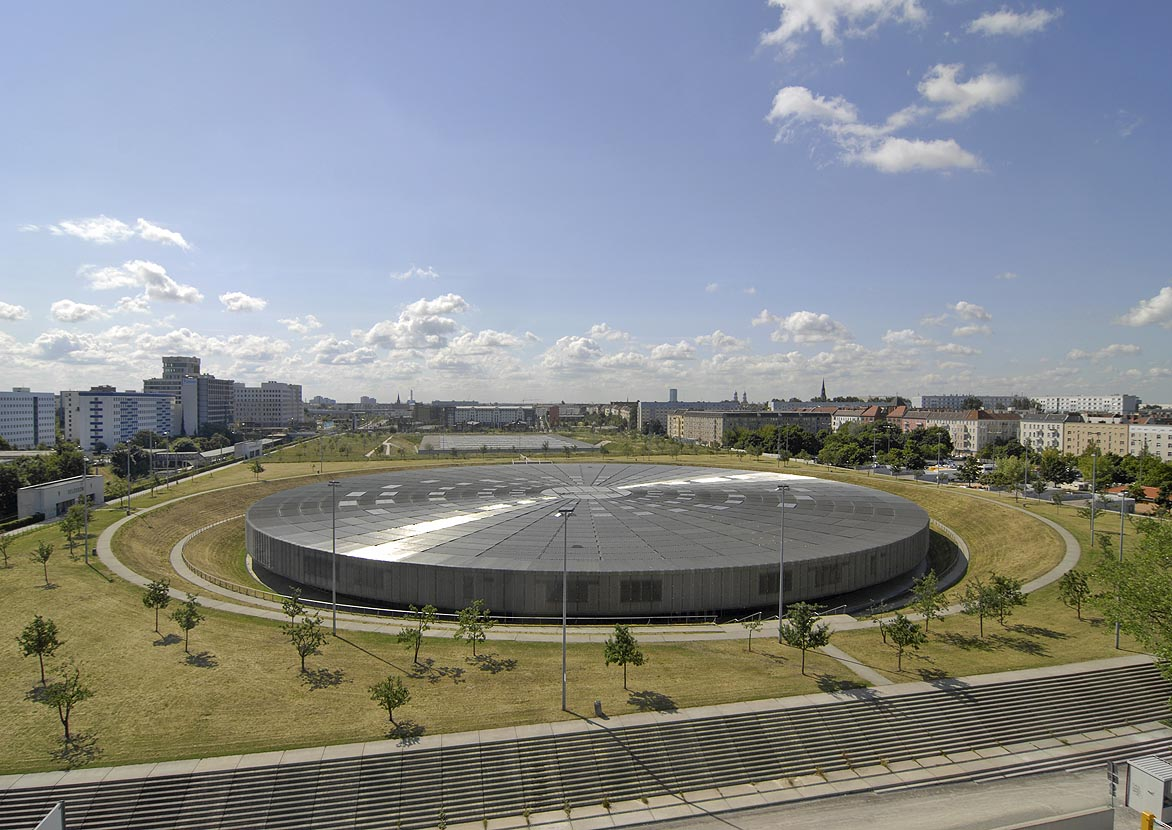
Velodrom in Berlin

Cycling is a popular sport in Germany, with Germany being one of the most successful cycling nations and one of the greatest riders of recent times Jan Ullrich dominated the Tour de France in 1997. He finished a full 9 minutes in front of second place rider Richard Virenque. Jan was regarded as Lance Armstrong's only consistent rival, finishing second to him several times in the Tour de France. Recently Tony Martin has emerged as one of the top Individual time trial specialists in the world, winning the time trial at the UCI Road World Championships in 2011, 2012, 2013 and 2016. André Greipel has been one of the most prolific winners among road sprinters since his breakthrough in the late 2000s, while fellow sprinters Marcel Kittel and John Degenkolb have also enjoyed major success from the early 2010s. In the three-year period from 2014 to 2016, Germany took more stage wins than any other nation in the Tour de France. Germany also topped the medal table at the 2016 UCI Road World Championships. In 2017 Germany hosted the start of the Tour de France for the fourth time, and for the first time since the race started in West Berlin in 1987, with the first two stages starting in Düsseldorf.

== Chess ==
Chess is a popular sport in Germany. There are about 84 Grandmasters and 242 International Masters in Germany. Emanuel Lasker was a famous German chess player who was World Chess Champion for 27 years.

== Card games ==
Bavarian pattern, Type Munich

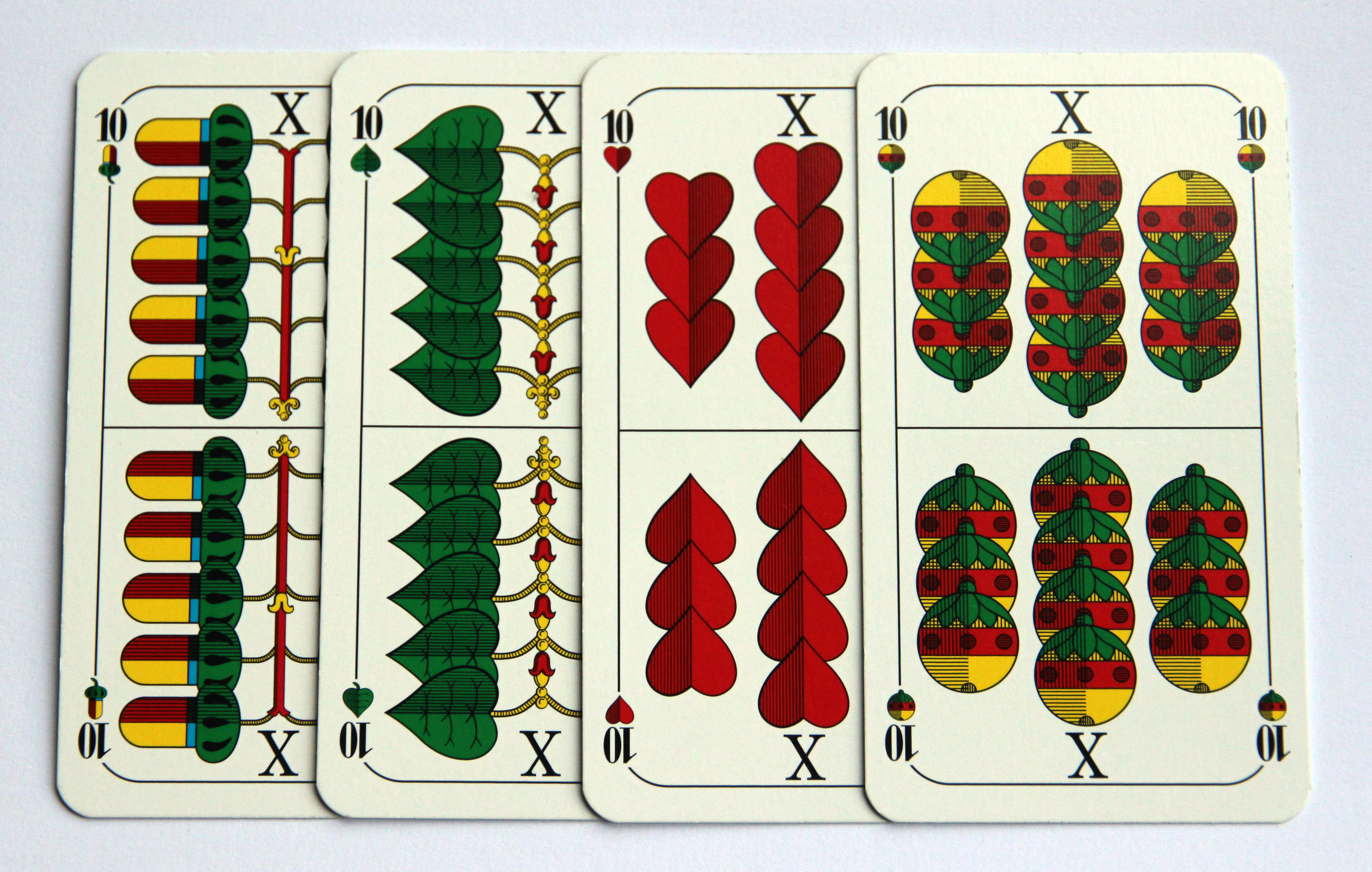
Full deck

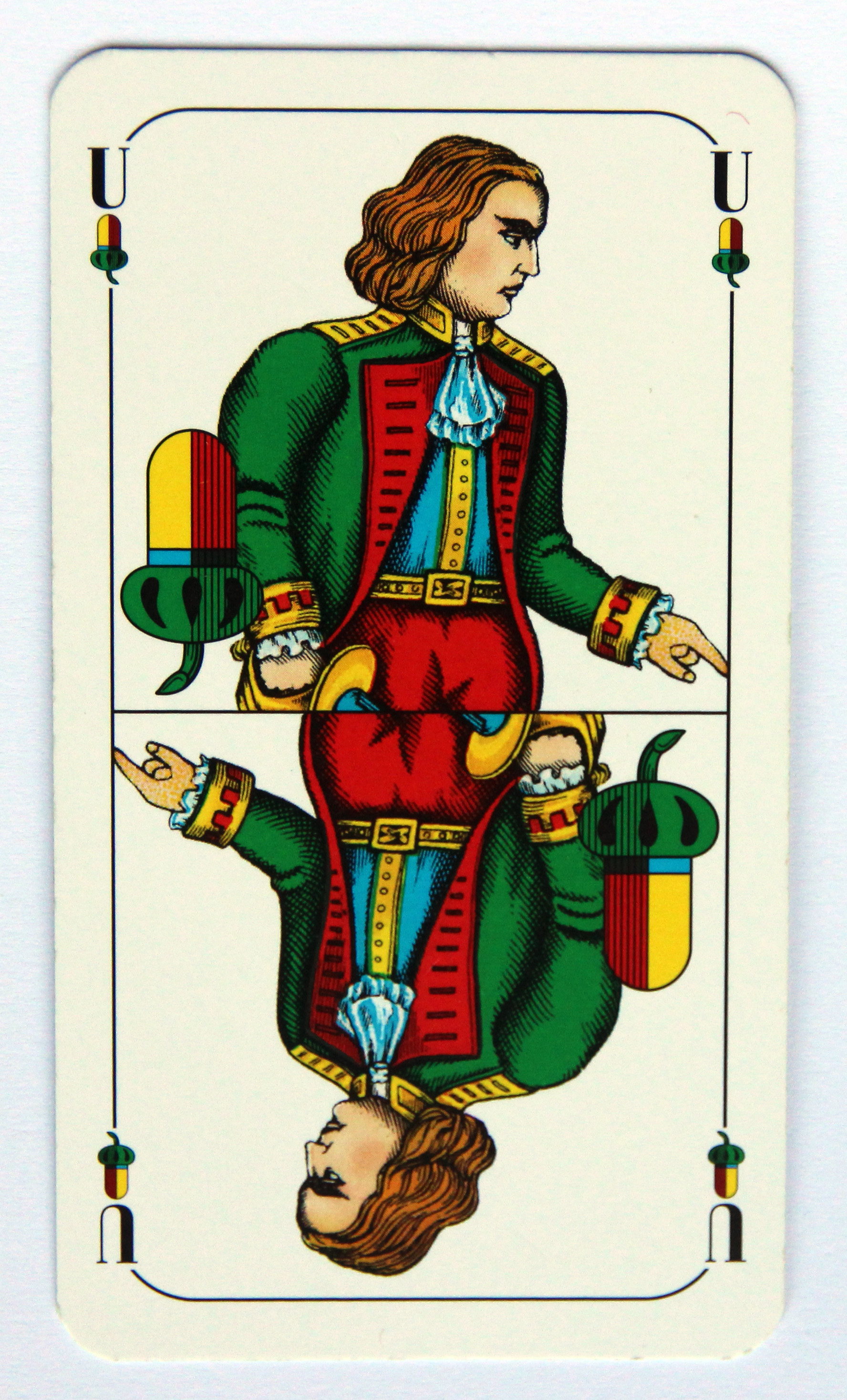
Unter of Acorns

Germany's national card game is Skat, played by an estimated 20 to 25 million Germans – more than play football – according to the German Skat Association. David Parlett describes it as "a national institution". Another leading game is Doppelkopf, the most popular traditional four-player game in the north and west of Germany which is regulated by the German Doppelkopf Association and has 69 affiliated clubs. In Bavaria, the "supreme discipline" of Bavarian card games and the "mother of all trump games" is Schafkopf, played by an estimated 2½ million people in south Germany. Apart from international games like Contract Bridge and Poker, other popular card games include 66, Watten and Rommé as well as children's games such as Pochen, a relative of Pope Joan, Schwimmen, and Mau Mau, possibly the ancestor of Crazy Eights.

In addition to games played with the standard 52-card pack of the English pattern, several German regions play games with traditional German-suited cards, including those of the Bavarian, East German, Franconian, Saxon and Württemberg pattern.

== Bodybuilding ==
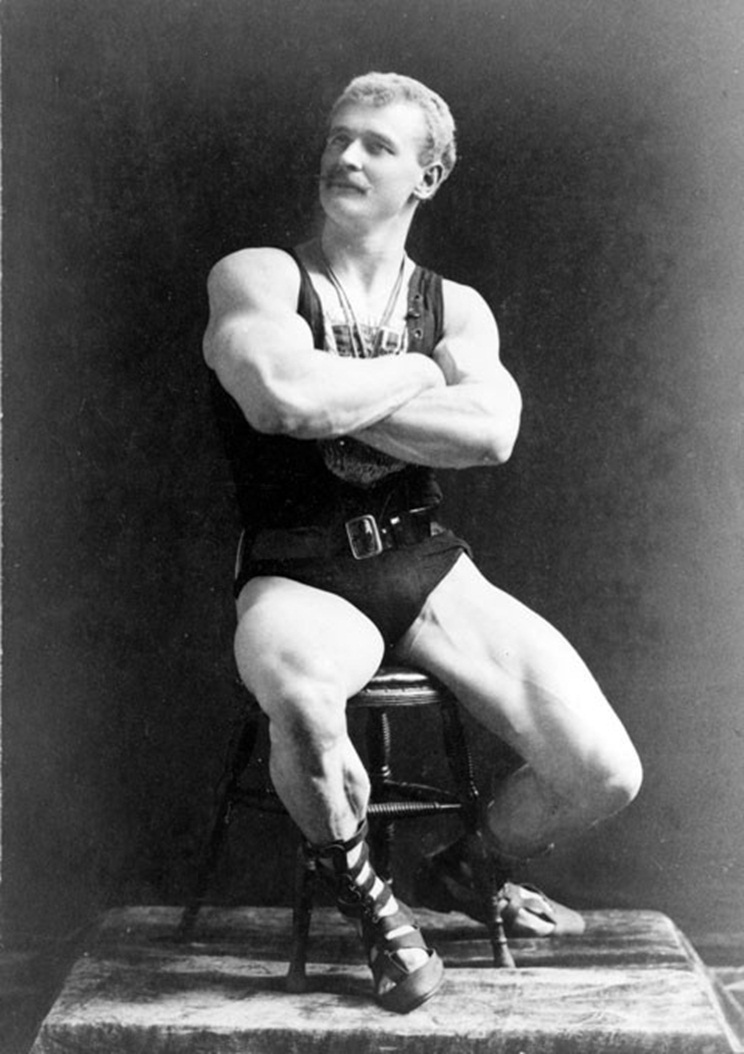
Eugen Sandow

1812 saw the start of Turnverein by Friedrich Ludwig Jahn, which started the tradition of muscle building in Germany focused around the gymnasium. At least 1,500 gymnasiums existed in Germany by the 1870s with muscle mass building a component of what took place in them. Eugen Sandow, "father of modern bodybuilding"., organised what is believed to be the world's first major bodybuilding competition, set in London's Royal Albert Hall.

In 2003, the German National Bodybuilding and Fitness Federation was founded by Berend Breitenstein. In 2003, the German National Bodybuilding and Fitness Federation became affiliated with the World Natural Bodybuilding Federation. Frank Guenther won the men's world championship in 2003. In 2004, the German National Bodybuilding and Fitness Federation organized the German National Bodybuilding Championships. Frank Kaeger won the men's world championship in 2007. In 2009, German competitor Sabine Streubel won the WNBF Pro World Championships in the women's category. In 2012, the German National Bodybuilding and Fitness Federation became affiliated with the Drug Free Athletes Coalition and severed its relationship with the World Natural Bodybuilding Federation. Germany is among the most successful countries at the List of World Amateur Bodybuilding Championships medalistsWorld Amateur Bodybuilding Championships.

== Combat sports ==
=== Boxing ===
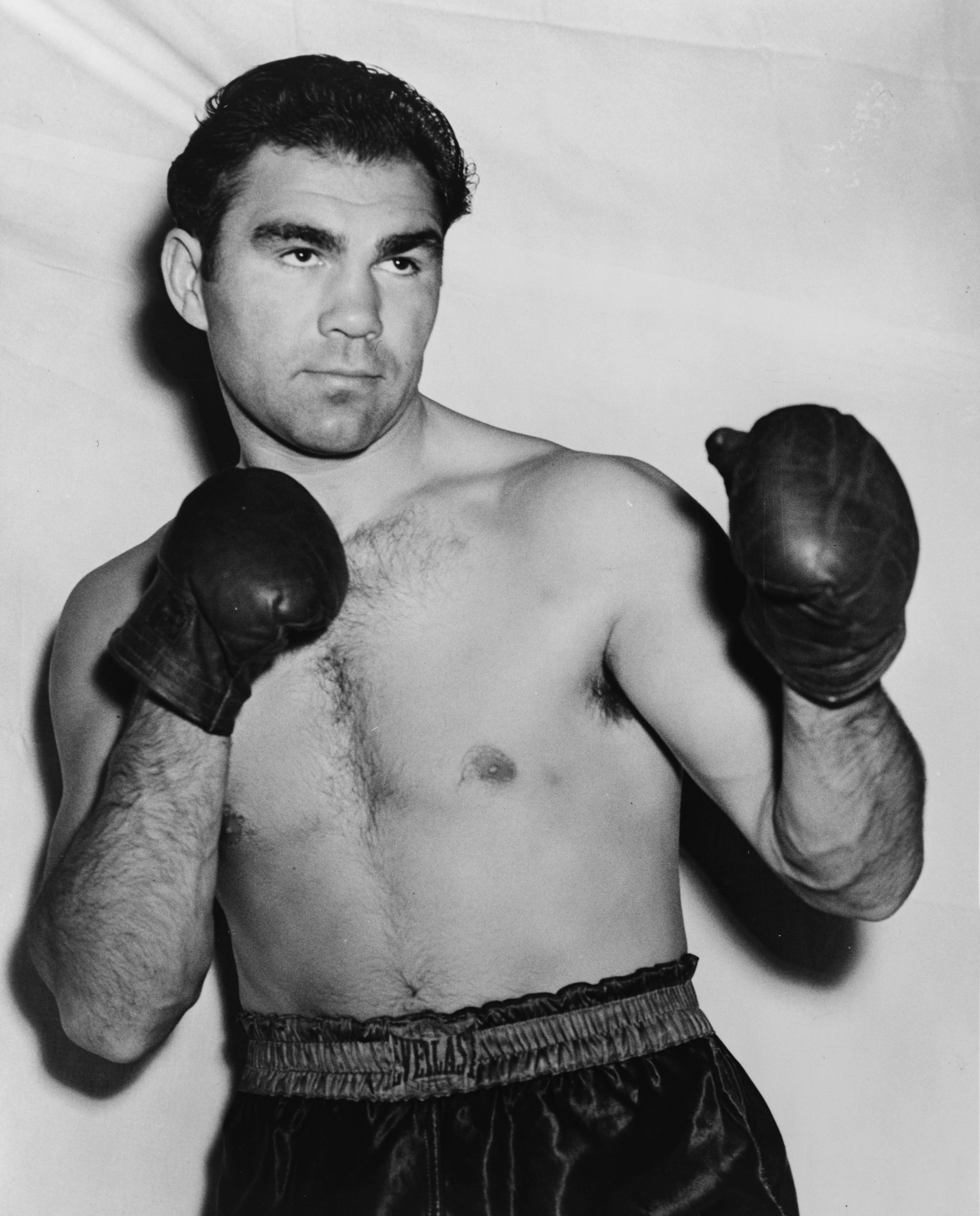
Max Schmeling in 1938

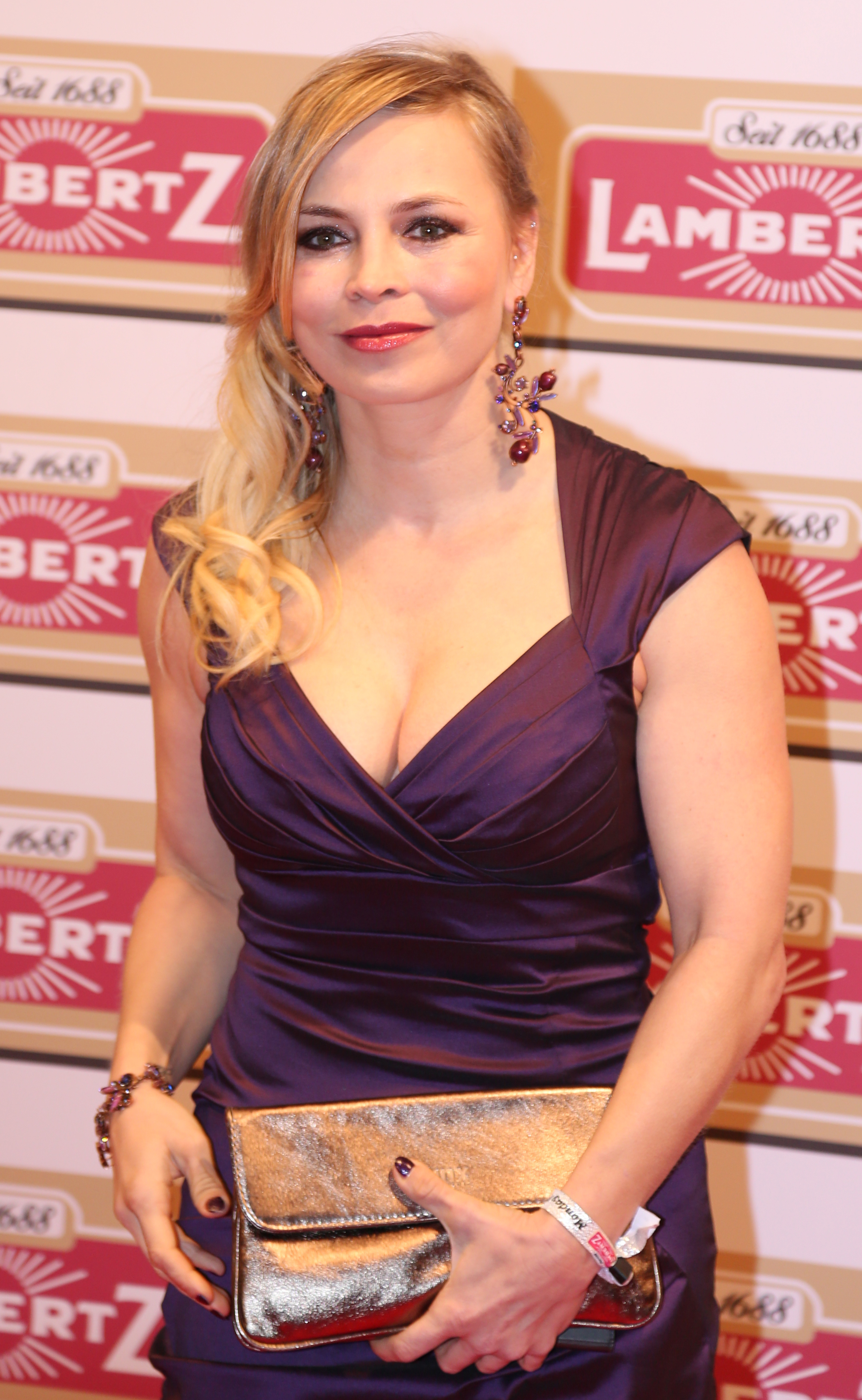
Regina Halmich in 2017

Combined Germany is the 7th most successful country at the Olympics. Boxing is among the most watched TV sports in Germany with both male and female fights enjoying regular spots on national television. Wladimir and Vitali Klitschko are among the two most popular boxers in Germany. German television network RTL has listed the Klitschko brothers as their most important asset next to football. In recent years Germany has become a hub for boxing, the Vegas of Europe, and many international fighters travel to fight out of the country. Henry Maske is a successful recent German box champion.

Max Schmeling was heavyweight champion of the world between 1930 and 1932. His two fights with Joe Louis in the late 1930s transcended boxing, and became worldwide social events because of their national associations. He was ranked 55 on Ring Magazine's list of 100 greatest punchers of all time. Regina Halmich is a German former professional boxer. She is among the most successful female boxers of all time and helped popularise female boxing in Europe. She was voted the 2nd best female boxer in history.

=== Other combat sports ===
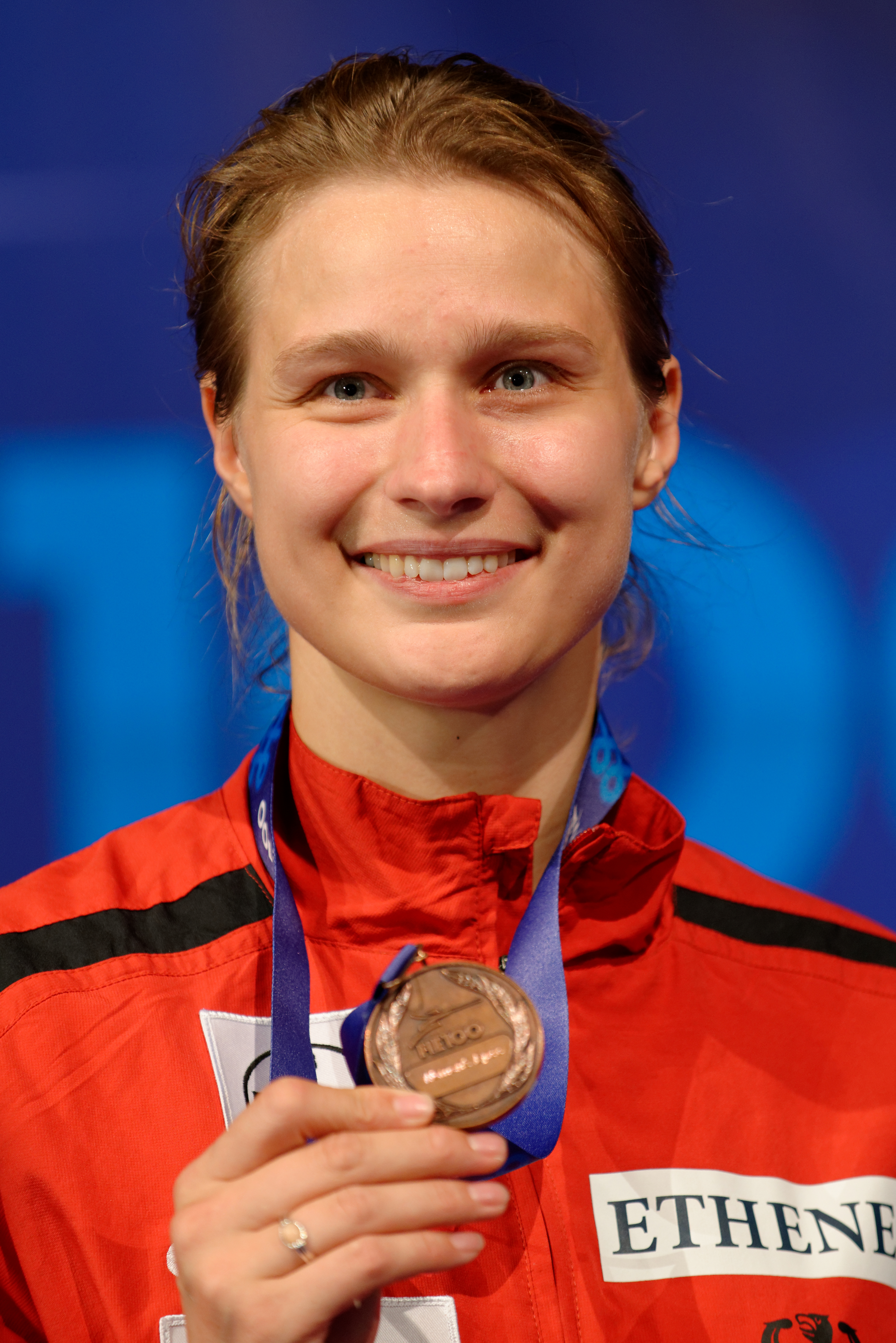
Britta Heidemann, fencer

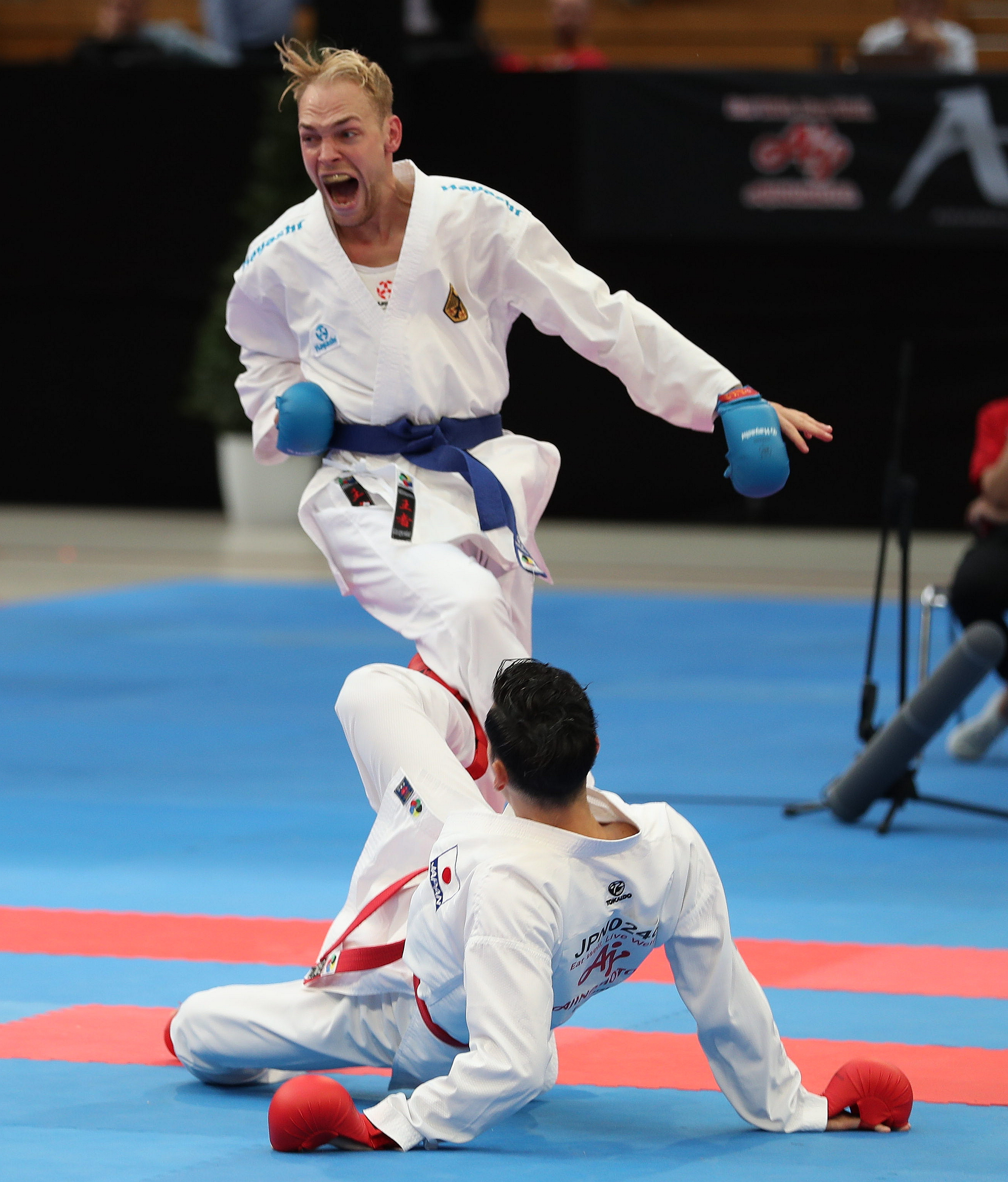
Noah Bitsch (left), karateka

Combat sports are participated and followed sports. There are many national and international events every year.

- Fencing: The German school of fencing (Deutsche Schule; Kunst des Fechtens (Note: The historical term Fechtschule "school of fencing" does not refer to the "German school" but to individual fencing competitions held in the early modern period, equivalent to the English Prize Playings.)) is a system of combat taught in the Holy Roman Empire during the Late Medieval, German Renaissance, and early modern periods. The earliest known surviving European fechtbuch (combat manual), and one of the oldest surviving martial arts manuals dealing with armed combat worldwide is the Royal Armouries Ms. I.33, which was written around 1300. The geographical center of this tradition was in what is now Southern Germany including Augsburg, Frankfurt, and Nuremberg.Germany is the 5th most successful fencing country at the Olympics. Noteworthy fencers are Anja Fichtel, Britta Heidemann, Benjamin Kleibrink, Matthias Behr, Thomas Bach, Ulrich Schreck, Alexander Pusch and Ute Kircheis-Wessel.
- Kickboxing is participated in Germany, both amateur and professionally. Notable Germany kickboxers are Ania Fucz, Rola El-Halabi, Stefan Leko, Chalid Arrab, James Phillips and Enriko Kehl.
- Karate is participated in Germany, both amateur and professionally. Germany is the 7th most successful country at the Karate World Championships and European Karate Championships. Notable Germany karateka are Noah Bitsch, Jonathan Horne, Efthimios Karamitsos, Ilja Smorguner, Willy Voss, Shara Hubrich, Nadine Joachim, Jasmin Jüttner, Reem Khamis and Johanna Kneer.
- Germany ranks 5th all-time in judo at the Olympics. Notable German judoka winners of gold medals at the Olympics are Udo Quellmalz, Frank Wieneke, Yvonne Bönisch and Dietmar Lorenz.
- Greco-Roman wrestling: Germany is the 10th most successful country at the summer olympics.
- Sudo is a german combat sport like to karate.

== Golf ==
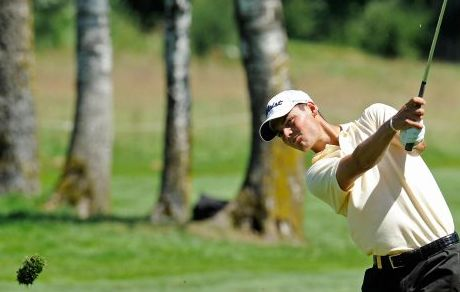
Martin Kaymer at the BMW Open

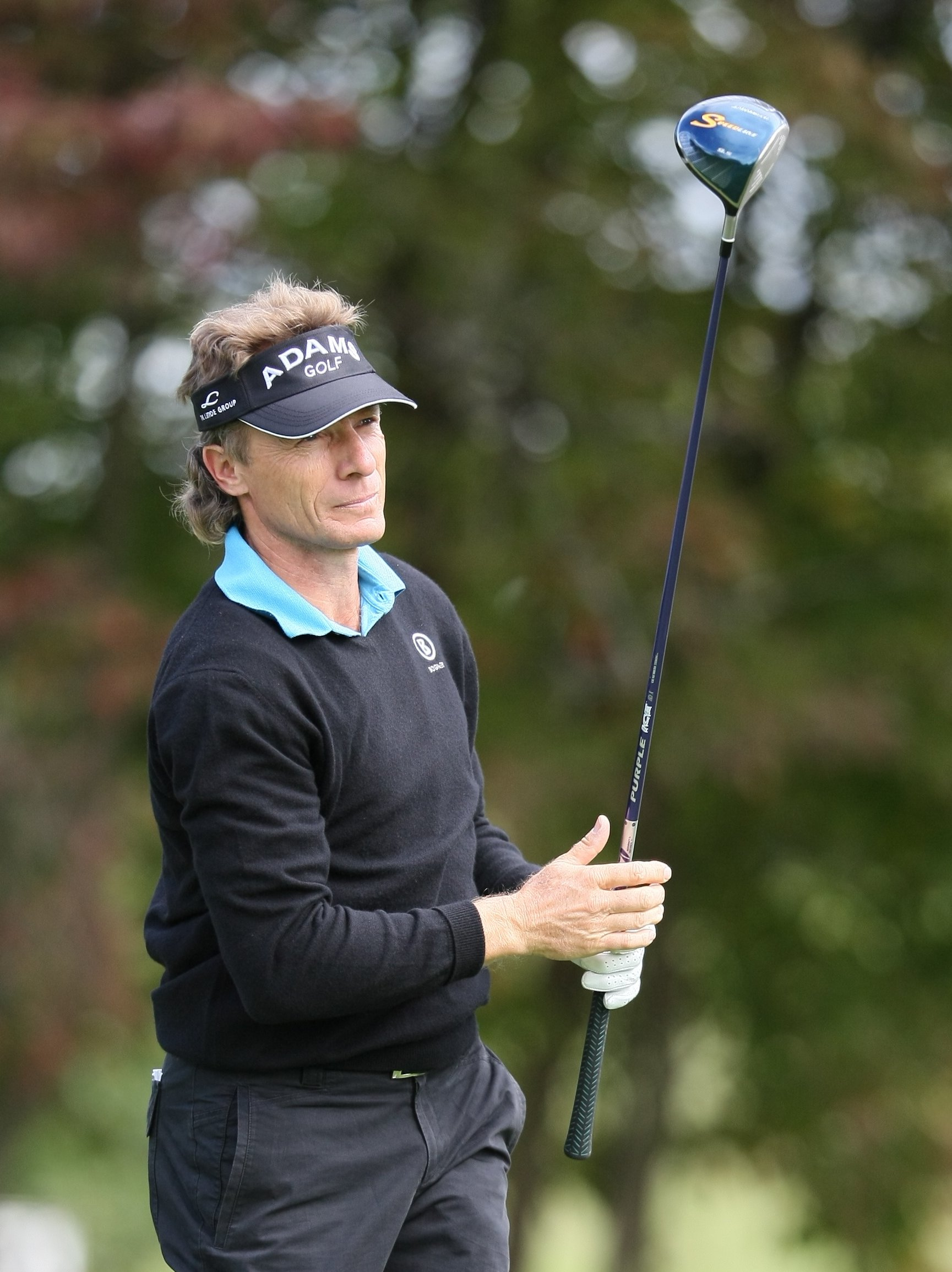
Bernhard Langer

As recently as 2007, Germany hosted three events on golf's European Tour—the Deutsche Bank Players Championship of Europe, the Mercedes-Benz Championship and the BMW International Open. However, since 2010, the only European Tour event in Germany has been the BMW International Open. The Players Championship was scrapped after 2007; the Mercedes-Benz Championship was not held in 2008, resumed in 2009, and dropped again in 2010. In 2015, the European Open was revived as a German tournament.

The Solheim Cup, the women's counterpart to the Ryder Cup, was hosted by Germany in 2015.

Two-time Masters champion Bernhard Langer is the first German to have won a major championship and is a former World No. 1. Since turning 50 in 2007, he has played mainly on the U.S. senior circuit, PGA Tour Champions; he has led that tour in prize money in 10 of his 11 full seasons, and has won a record 10 senior majors in his career (The Tradition in 2016 and 2017; the Senior PGA Championship in 2017; the U.S. Senior Open in 2010; the Senior Players Championship in 2014, 2015, and 2016; and The Senior Open Championship in 2010, 2014, and 2017). Langer is also the only golfer to have won all five of the current senior majors. Martin Kaymer became the second German to win a major championship by winning the 2010 PGA Championship in Wisconsin, and in 2011 rose to World No. 1. In 2014 he also won the U.S. Open Championship at Pinehurst No. 2, North Carolina.

== Field Hockey ==
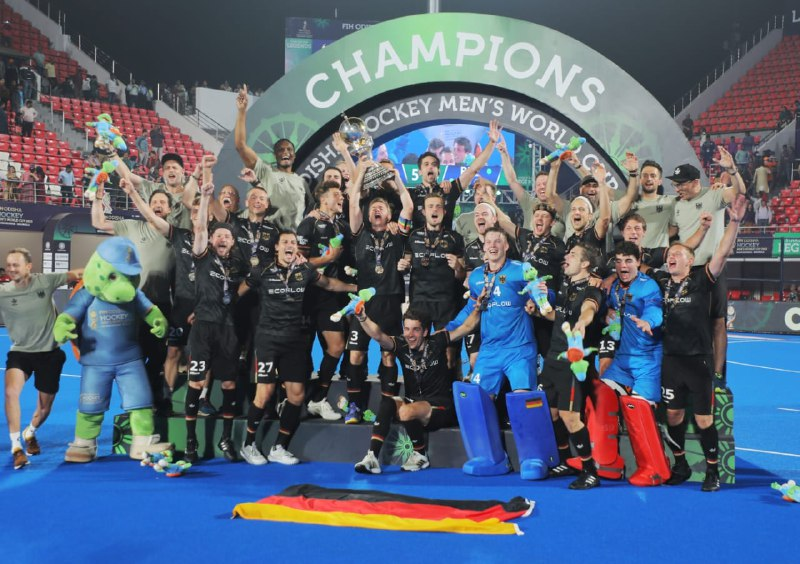
Germany winning 2023 Men's FIH Hockey World Cup

The Germany men's national field hockey team is one of the most successful sides in the world, winning gold at the Summer Olympics four times (including once as West Germany), the Hockey World Cup 3 times, the EuroHockey Nations Championship eight times (including twice as West Germany) and the Hockey Champions Trophy nine times (including three times as West Germany).

The Germany women's national field hockey team won the World Cup and European Championships 2 times and is the 3rd most successful nation at the olympics.

Germany has sent national teams to the Under-19 World Lacrosse Championships.

== Water sports ==
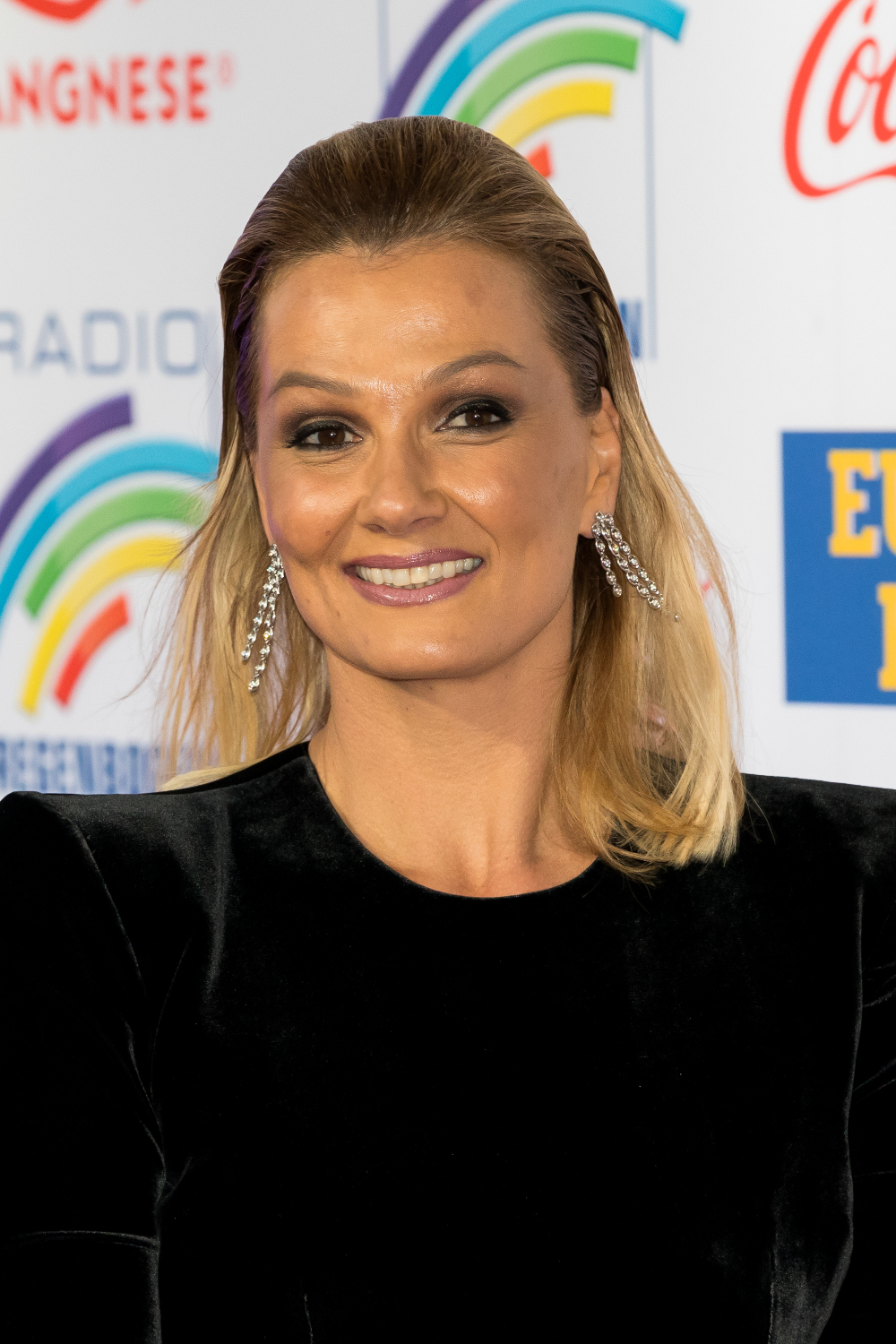
Franziska van Almsick

With Germany being one of the most successful water sports nations in sports like sailing, rowing, swimming, wind- and kitesurfing, wakeboarding, underwater diving, fishing, powerboating water aerobics and yachting are popular in Germany, especially with large annual events such as Kiel Week or Hanse Sail in Rostock.

Germany is among the most successful nations at the LEN European Aquatics Championships, World Aquatics Championships and in the swimming events at the Summer Olympics.

Among the most well known athletes are Franziska van Almsick, Britta Steffen, Michael Gross, Peter Nocke, Paul Biedermann and Heike Friedrich.

== See also ==
- Baseball in Germany
- Handball in Germany
- Bundesjugendspiele
