= Thirty-one (card game) =

Gambling card game

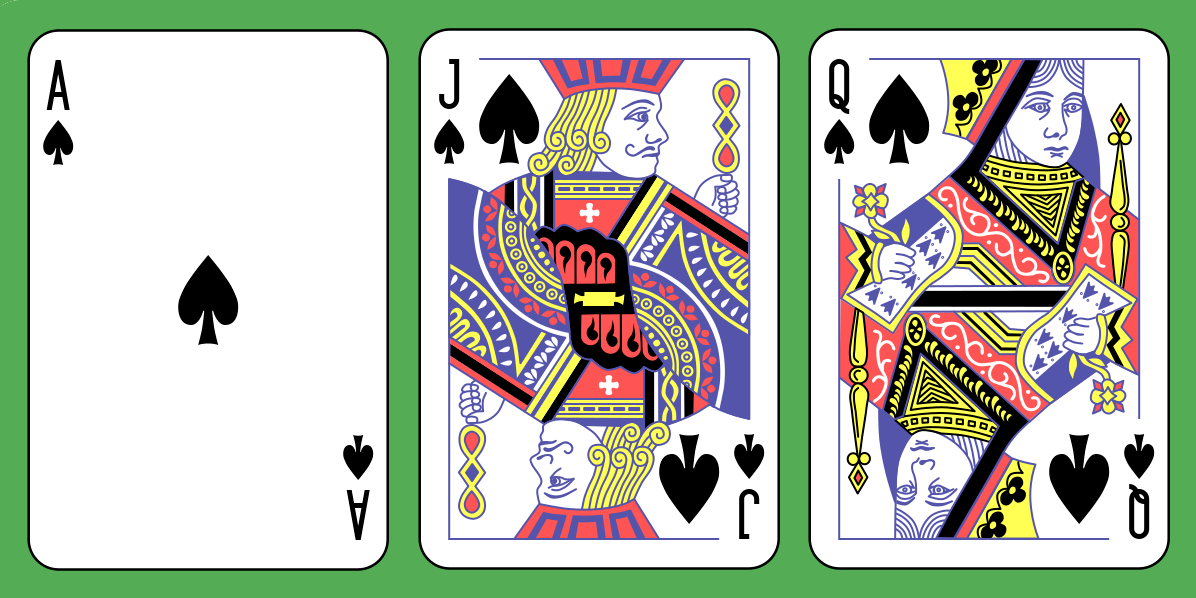
A blitz hand of three same-suit cards scoring 31, which immediately ends the game in victory when attained by a player. (The ace scores 11 and the two court cards each score 10.)

Thirty-one or trente et un is a gambling card game played by two to seven people, where players attempt to assemble a hand which totals 31. Such a goal has formed the whole or part of various games since the 15th century such as commerce, cribbage, trentuno, and wit and reason. 31 is popular in America and Britain.

Although the game is also known as scat, it has no connection with Germany's national card game of Skat. It should also not be confused with other games called 31 including Schwimmen (also known as Schnauz or Hosen runter) and the Greek banking game of 31.

== Name ==
The object is to obtain a hand with a value total as close as possible to 31, from which the name of the game is taken.

The game is also known as blitz, scat, Cadillac in south Louisiana and Mississippi, cad in Pennsylvania, whammy! in central Indiana, juble in Oklahoma and Kansas, as also as kitty, high hat, ride the bus and Geronimo. The game is also known as nickle knock in Hawaii.

== History ==
Thirty-one is first mentioned in a French translation of a 1440 sermon by the Italian, Saint Bernadine, so may be of Italian origin. It is mentioned by Rabelais, Cardano and numerous other 16th century sources, but David Parlett notes that the name referred to two different card games – one like pontoon and one like commerce.

The game spread rapidly across Europe to become popular in France, England and Ireland and is a precursor to vingt-un. In the 1670s, Francis Willughby recorded thirty-one being played in England.

== Gameplay ==
Thirty-one uses a standard deck of 52 playing cards (in the Dutch version - Eenendertigen - only 32 cards - 7 and higher - are used). Aces are high, counting 11, court cards count 10, and all other cards count face value. Each player gets a hand of three cards, and three pennies as their "lives". The rest of the deck sits in the middle of the table as stock for the game, and the top card of the stock is turned over to begin the discard.

After the hands in the first round are dealt, play proceeds with each player, starting with the player to the immediate left of the dealer and going clockwise around the table, taking the top card of either the stock or the discard and subsequently discarding a card. All players are trying to collect a hand value of 31 (or the nearest to it) in the same suit. Play continues clockwise around the table until any player knocks or obtains a blitz.

When it is a player's turn, and that player believes their hand is high enough to beat at least one other opponent, that player may knock on the table in lieu of drawing and discarding. Once a player knocks, all other players, going clockwise from the player who knocked, have one more turn to draw from the stock and discard, or have the option of keeping all three cards in their hands, known as standing. The round ends when the player to the right of the player who knocked has had a final turn. If no one knocks by the time a player exhausts the stock, the round ends in a draw. Because knocking relies on the confidence that the player will not have the lowest score, a skilled player may memorise which suits the other players are discarding. If a player discards a different suit than that which they discarded their previous turn, it can be inferred that the player is "changing suits". Changing suits puts a player at a distinct disadvantage because the resulting lowered score raises the risk that another player may knock.

At the end of the round, all players show their hands and total each one up, only counting cards of the same suit. For instance, if the three cards in a hand are all different suits, the highest value card would stand as that player's score. The player whose hand scored the lowest loses the deal, and loses one life. In the event of a tie between two players for lowest score, both players are declared losers and each loses one life. If there is a tie involving the knocker for the lowest score, the knocker is safe. If the knocker does not have a higher value than at least one other player, the knocker loses two lives.

If, at any time in the round prior to someone knocking, a player acquires a hand value of exactly 31 in the same suit, known as a blitz, their hand is immediately shown. This ends the round and all other players lose a life.

There is one case where it is possible to pick up one's own discard. This happens when there are only two players left in the game and one player knocks. The card that the other player discarded just before the knock is still on top of the pile, so it is now available to take back if desired. For example, if the player had just broken up a suit for tactical reasons, they can now restore it.

=== Scoring ===
When a player loses a life, they pay one of their pennies into the centre of the table. A player with no pennies left is said to be "on the county", and is out of the game if they lose any further lives. The game continues until only one player remains.

== Common variations ==
=== California Quick ===
A simple variation of the game useful for larger groups due to how fast a full game can be played. In this version, ties for the lowest hand result in a loss for the knocker and who they are tied with. Any loss for the knocker results in the loss of two lives, whether it be from failing the knock or if another player obtains a 31 during the knock. In addition, if the first person to play knocks on their first turn, the round ends and all players reveal their hand without drawing any more cards. This is called "knocking out of the gate." Normally, a 31 must be declared the moment it is obtained, but in this version, a person who is dealt a 31 can only reveal it after the first player chooses to abstain from knocking out of the gate.

=== Banking ===
The play is the same as the regular version of thirty-one described above, but with the following changes. Before each round, each player has to ante one token or coin onto the centre of the table. While dealing, after each player has received one card, the dealer puts one card face down on the table to form a pile of three cards known as the "widow". A player may use a turn to exchange one or more cards in their hand with an equivalent number of cards in the widow, leaving the cards they put in the widow face up.

At the end of the round, the player with the highest-valued hand takes all the tokens or coins on the table. If any player acquires a blitz in their hand, they immediately show it, the round ends, all other players place one token or coin on the table, and the player who blitzed takes all of the tokens or coins on the table.

=== Dollar bill ===
In this US version, players keep track of their lives by folding down the corners of a five-dollar note. The five-dollar note is also their stake in the game. (This can be substituted with other denominations or currency.)

A player who has folded all four corners of their bill, continues to play on a "free ride", also sometimes called "on the bike". On losing again, the player drops out of the game. The last player in the game wins all the five dollar bills.

=== Three-of-a-kind ===
One optional rule is that if a player has three cards of the same value from different suits, the hand is worth 30.5 points.

=== West Lansing cut throat ===
The play is the same as the regular version of thirty-one described above, but with the following changes:

- Three tokens are purchased for the agreed upon amount of money prior to play beginning, and the last player with any tokens wins the pot.
- There is no "free ride". A player who knocks but does not beat at least one other player, pays two tokens. In this scenario the knocker tying for the lowest score will lose two tokens. All others with the same total as the knocker will not lose a token.
- Three cards of the same rank count as a score of 30½, however all hands ranking as 30½ are equal and considered a tie, E.g. 2,2,2 and A,A,A.

Side wagers between individual players are quite common and often encouraged. Typically the first players knocked out will often choose an active player and place a "side bet" on which player will win or go further in the game.

=== Switch ===
The goal of the game is the same as in normal thirty-one. The difference for this version called Switch is that instead of picking from the pile or the discard up-card, players exchange cards from two hands on the table. At the beginning of the game, the dealer is dealt two hands, and one extra hand is dealt and placed in the middle of the table face-down. The dealer looks at both hands and chooses the hand they want to play with and places the other hand face-up next to the face-down hand. Then it is the turn of the player next to the dealer.

During a turn, a player has four options:

- Pick up a certain card in one of the hands on the table and exchange it for one of the cards held in their hand (if they pick up a face-down card, their discard will be face-up).
- Swap one of the hands entirely with their own hand.
- Renew one of the hands on the table. (If they renew a hand on the table, they have the choice to place it face-up or face-down. If they choose face-up, their turn is over; if they choose face-down their turn continues.)
- "Nock". Nocking applies the same as it does in the normal game.

At the end of the game, the winner is decided in the same way as in the normal game of thirty-one, although if a player has a hand of three cards of the same suit and is greater than 21, they may choose to restart the game making their hand the new face-up hand for the new game and re-dealing all hands for the other players and the face-down hand.

=== No-elimination variant ===
This is a version which uses a running total instead of money or tokens. After each round of the game, each player earns points for a running total as follows:

- Lowest score in the round: 1 point (or 0 if that player Knocked)
- Middle score(s) in the round: 2 points (or 1 if that player Knocked)
- Highest score in the round: 3 points (or 4 if that player Knocked)
- Blitz (31) – 6 points

All ties get highest score possible. For instance, a tally of 30, 27, 27, 27 means 30 is high, and all 27s are middle (no low score for that hand).

=== Stop the bus ===
Stop the bus is a game common in England that uses the hand rankings from three card brag, instead of scoring closest to 31. The hand rankings are: three of a kind (a "prial") as the best hand, followed by a running flush, then a run, then a flush, then a pair followed by a high card. If a hand is otherwise similar then the card is ranked by high card or high pair, then by middle card or kicker, then low card. Suits are irrelevant.

Instead of drawing from a stock, the game starts with three face-up cards on the tables. On their turn, players may swap one or three cards from their hand for the table cards.

== See also ==
- Biribi
- Trente et quarante

== Bibliography ==
- Parlett, David (1991). A History of Card Games, OUP, Oxford. ISBN 0-19-282905-X
