= Schwimmen =

European card game

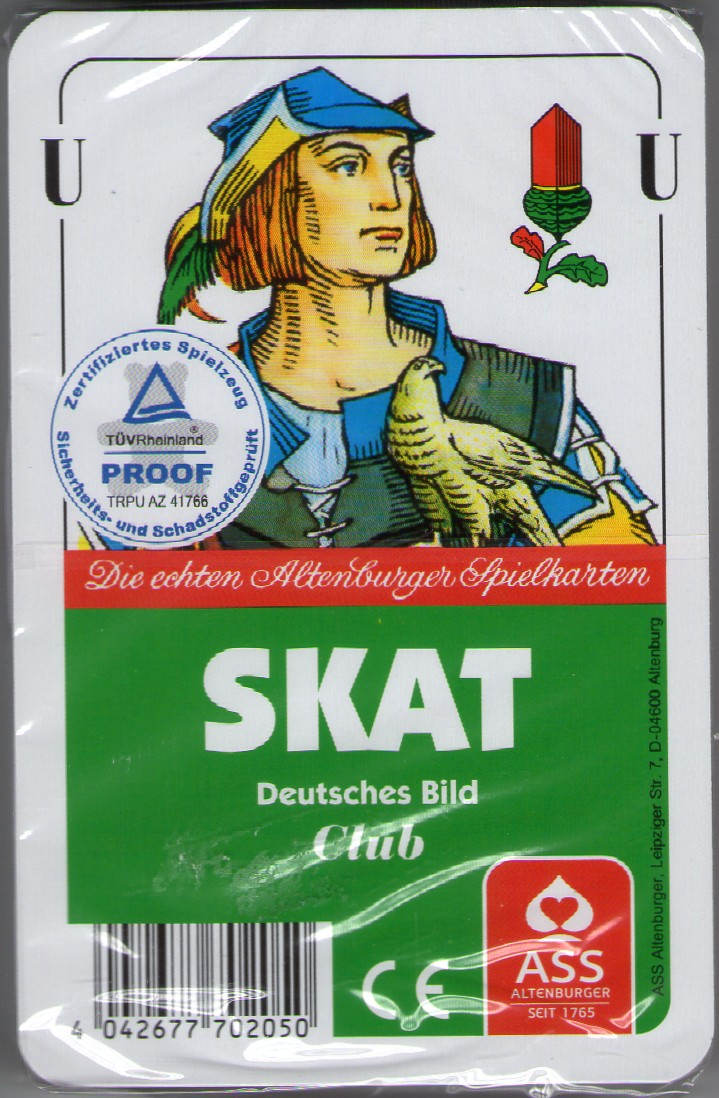
- German pack
- Origin: possibly Austria
- Alternative names: Einunddreißig, Knack, Schnauz, Wutz, Bull, Hosen runter, Hosn obe, Hosn obi, Hosn owi, Hose ab, Hosenabe
- Type: Shedding card game
- Players: 2 to 9
- Cards: 3 per player
- Deck: 32-card French or German. Larger or multiple decks for 6+ players.
- Play: Clockwise (Anti for Switzerland)
- Playing time: 5 minutes

Schwimmen or Einunddreißig is a social card game for two to nine players, played with a 32-card Piquet pack, that is popular in Austria and Germany. Similar games in the United States and Great Britain go under the names of Thirty-One, Blitz and Scat, but are played with a 52-card pack. Schwimmen is also played in tournament form.

== Name ==
Schwimmen is German for "swimming" which refers to the last chance that a player gets before they drop out. Although it is also called Einunddreißig, (Note: That is, Thirty-one or French: Trente-et-un.) this should not be confused with a predecessor of Siebzehn und Vier, (Note: That is, Twenty-One.) also called Einunddreißig. As well as Schwimmen and Einunddreißig the game is also known in Germany as Knack, Schnauz, Wutz and Bull. In Austria it is called Hosen runter, Hosn obe, Hosn obi, Hosn owi and Hose ab (Vorarlberg). In Switzerland it is Hosenabe.

== History ==
According to Kastner, the game is not well recorded in the literature, but appears to go back to a French ancestor, Commerce, that was first mentioned in 1718 in the Academie des Jeux.

The game was included in the list of games prohibited in Austria-Hungary by the Ministry of Justice under the names Trente-un and Feuer – but whilst the former name can also refer to the aforementioned Siebzehn und vier ancestor, the name Feuer clearly refers to this game, because in the most common variation a hand of three Aces (Feuer) has special significance (see below).

== Rules ==
=== General ===
Schwimmen is played in clockwise order with a pack of 32 French, Double German or German playing cards (Skat pack). A second pack may be used if there are more than 6 players. When on lead, each player aims to form a certain combination of hand cards by exchanging. The aim of the game is to avoid having the combination with the lowest point value.

=== Aim ===
There are two ways in which combinations can be formed. The first is where a player either collects cards of the same suit and adds their point values (cf. the game of Einundvierzig), whereby:

- An Ace scores 11 points,
- the court cards – King, Queen and Jack – each score 10 points and
- the pip cards – 10, 9, 8 and 7 – score their respective face values.

The highest possible number of points is thus thirty-one (Einunddreißig): a hand consisting of an Ace and 2 courts or an Ace, a court and a Ten of the same suit.

The second option is for a player to collect cards of the same rank, e.g. three 7s, three Queens, etc. (obviously of different suits). This combination always scores 30 ½ points.

=== Playing ===
In an 'open game' (offenes Spiel) the dealer deals three cards, face down and individually, to each other player and then deals to self 2 packets of three cards. The dealer looks at the cards from one packet and decides whether or not to play with them. If the dealer is happy to play with the cards from this first packet, the second packet is laid face up in the middle of the table. If the dealer does not want to play with the first packet, these three cards are laid face up in the middle of the table and the dealer must play with the cards in the second packet. The remaining cards are put to one side.

Eldest hand, the player left of the dealer, begins. Players may either swap one card or all three of their hand cards with the cards in the middle – but not two cards. A player who doesn't want to exchange may either say "I'll shove" ("Ich schiebe") or close the game by 'knocking', usually by knocking on the table. In some areas players may say "I'm closing" ("Ich mache zu.") instead of knocking.

=== End of the deal ===
A deal may be ended in two ways:

- If a player knocks or says "I'll close", all the others may swap or shove one last time and then the game ends. To close, a player needs at least 20 points in hand.
- A player who holds 31 points (known variously as "Einunddreißig", "Schnauz", "Knack", "Hosn obi" etc.) or, in the case of the variant known as Feuer (cf. below), holds 3 Aces - lays the cards face up on the table and the deal ends there and then. This can happen immediately after dealing. If, as is usual, there are several rounds of exchanging, the loser is determined at the end. A loser or losers are the player or players who have the card combinations with the fewest points.

=== Scoring ===
Players only score for pairs or prials of the same suit or for 3 of a kind.

Cards	Score
Queen of hearts 10 of hearts Jack of diamonds	10 + 10 = 20 points (only the Queen and Ten belong to the same suit)
Ace of clubs King of clubs 9 of clubs	11 + 10 + 9 = 30 points
Ace of diamonds King of diamonds 10 of diamonds	11 + 10 + 10 = 31 points
7 of diamonds 7 of hearts 7 of spades	Three of a kind always scores 30½ points (if two have 30½, the higher ranking hand wins)

=== Swimming ===
If several deals are played, each player is symbolically given three 'lives'. These may be indicated by counters such as chips, matches or coins. Players have to give up a 'life' each time they lose, by placing one of the counters in the middle of the table.

A player who has lost all three lives may continue to play but is now 'swimming' (schwimmt) or is a 'cow rider' (Kuhreiter), hence the name of the game. A player who loses again 'goes under' (geht er unter) and drops out. So 'swimming' is effectively a fourth life and the player's last chance to avoid dropping out.

In this way, there is a form of tournament in which the individual players drop out one by one and eventually only one player is left, the overall winner. If the game is played for stakes, the winner wins the stakes of the losers (or their lives).

== Variants and special rules ==
Schwimmen or Einunddreißig are played in many variations which differ in detail from the basic rules above. The rules given here are in no wise binding like the rules of chess, for example – before the start of a session, players should ascertain which rules are being used. The most important variations relate to:

- Cards: for larger numbers of players the game may be played with a pack of 52 whist cards. In Switzerland, Jass packs of 36 cards are used and play is anti-clockwise.

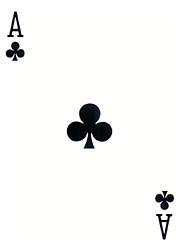
Ace of Clubs

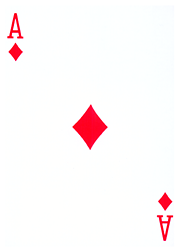
Ace of Diamonds

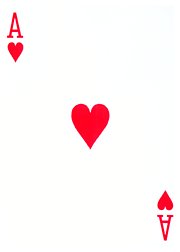
Aces of Hearts

Example of a Feuer or Blitz
- Feuer or Blitz: a hand consisting of 3 cards of the same rank usually scores 30 ½ points. Often a hand of three Aces is counted as the highest combination and is called Feuer ("fire") or Blitz ("lightning"). A player who holds 3 Aces reveals them and the game ends immediately. In this case all the other players lose a life.
- Losing: among many players the rule is that at the end of a round all players with 20 points or fewer and the player who has the lowest score over 20 points must pay. The winner of a round never has to pay, though, even if no other players have scores over 20. This rule not only accelerates the game, but offers additional finesses: for example, if Ann has 21 points and cannot significantly improve her hand by exchanging, she has to pay in any case. It is therefore to her advantage to worsen her hand by exchanging so that at least another player loses a life. This tactic is known as 'ripping' (reißen).
- Shoving (schieben): if all players 'shove' in succession, the three cards in the middle of the table are placed to one side and replaced by three new cards from the stock. The player who started the shoving, then leads.
- Passing is not always allowed, reducing a players options to exchanging or knocking.
- Handeln: players may either add the point value from cards of the same suit or of the same rank (cf. a bit like the game of Einundvierzig).
- Closed Game (verdecktes Spiel): the player to the left of the dealer is dealt five cards in packets of 3 + 2. This player retains three cards and gives the remaining two, face down, to the player on the left, who does likewise.

== Literature ==
- Arnold, Peter (2002). The Complete Book of Card Games, London: Chancellor Press.
- Dawson, Lawrence H. (1950) [1994] The Complete Hoyle's Games, London: Wordsworth Reference
- Grupp, Claus D. (1976) Glücksspiele mit Kugel, Würfel und Karten, Wiesbaden: Falken Verlag. (contains the game of Handeln)
- Pieper Sven and Bärbel Schmidt (1994). Kartenspiele, Stuttgart: Reclams Universalbibliothek Band 4216.
- Kansil, Joli Quentin (2004). Official Rules of Card Games, 90th Edition. Cincinnati: The United States Playing Card Company.
- Kastner, Hugo. "Hosen Runter" in Spielejournal, 2008.
- Morehead, Albert H. and Geoffrey Mott-Smith (1983). Hoyle's Rules of Games, 2nd revised edition. A Signet Book.
- Sirch, Walter (2008). Vom Alten zum Zwanzger – Bayerische Kartenspiele for Kinder and Erwachsene – neu entdeckt. Traunstein: Bayerischer Trachtenverband.
