= Commerce (card game) =

French gambling game

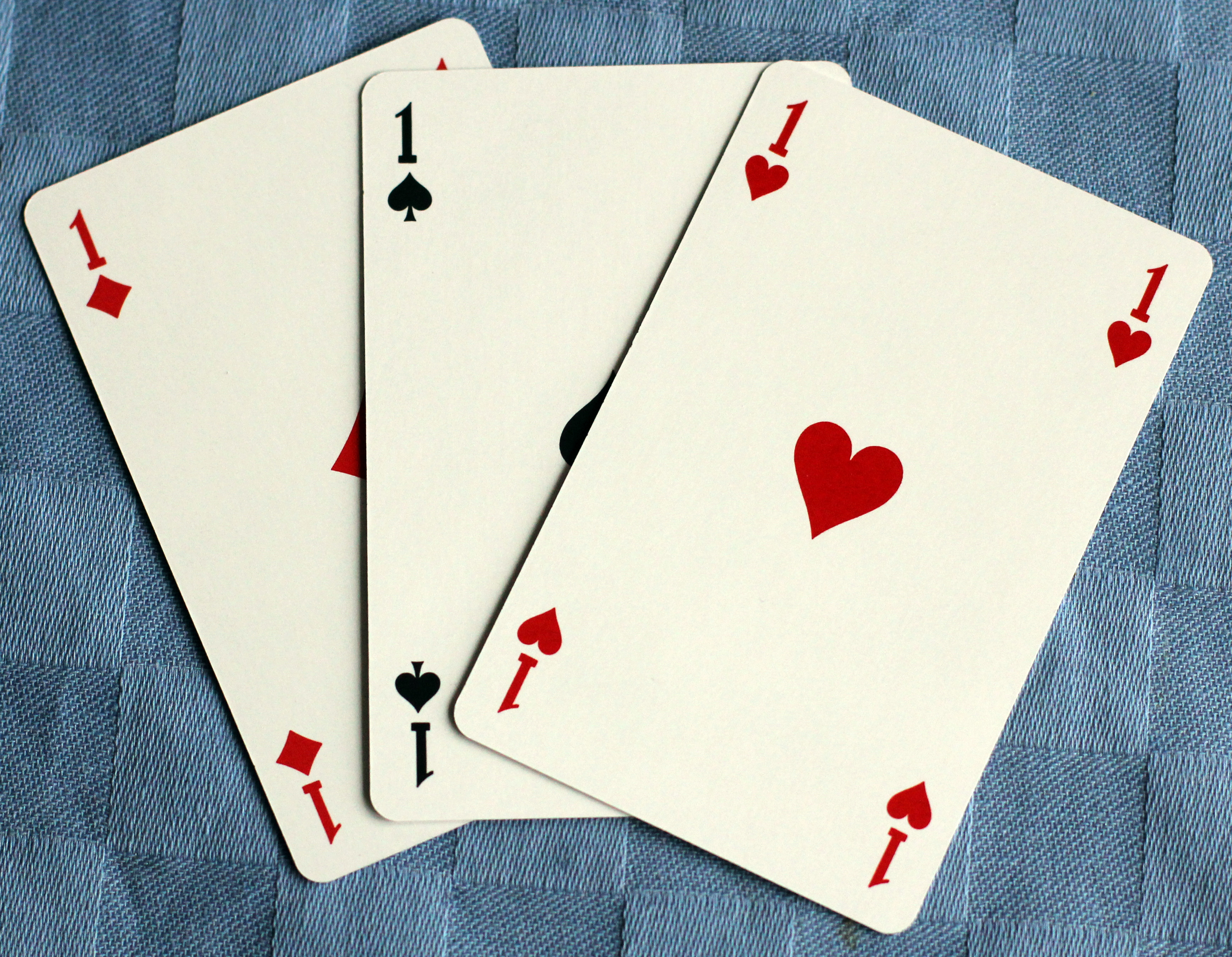
- The best combination – three aces
- Origin: France
- Players: 3-10
- Cards: 52, 40, or 32 cards
- Deck: French
- Play: Clockwise
- Playing time: 15 min.
- Chance: Easy

Related games
- Thirty-one

Commerce is an 18th-century gambling French card game akin to thirty-one and perhaps ancestral to whisky poker and stop the bus. It aggregates a variety of games with the same game mechanics. Trade and barter, the English equivalent, has the same combinations, but a different way of acquiring them. Trentuno and Trente et un, apply basically to the same method of play, but also have slightly different combinations. Its rules are recorded as early as 1769.

== Object ==
Like other games of the commerce group, the aim is to finish with the best three-card combination in hand. The players can try to improve their hands by swapping one or more of their cards for a table card and this continues until one of the players is satisfied with their hand, bringing the game to a showdown.

== Rules ==
Commerce is usually played by 3–10 players, although any number can play. The game is played with a complete pack of 52 cards ranking A K Q J T 9 8 7 6 5 4 3 2. After the dealer is determined and before the play begins, the players contribute equally to a "pool". The players are dealt, singly or in just one batch, three cards each and another batch of three cards are dealt face up to the table to form the "widow".

Before looking at their own cards, the dealer may exchange one or two of their cards for one or two of the exposed cards on the table, putting their own, face upwards, in their place. Their object is to "make their hand", but if they exchange all three cards at once, they cannot do it again. Thereafter, each in turn, starting with the eldest, can do likewise.

Usually there are as many rounds in the game as there are players, and a fresh card is added to the "widow" at the beginning of each. A player who is satisfied with their cards then knocks on the table instead of playing, and play ceases as soon as two players have knocked. When the rounds are finished the players show their cards and the holder of the best combination receives the stake deposited in the "pool", while the player with the worst hand puts one counter called "Going up" therein. The player whose three counters are first gone off may purchase one more counter, called "Buying a horse", for a sum usually one third of the original stake, or as agreed, to be put into the pool. After that, every player, whose counters are gone must wait until the game comes to an end, which is concluded by the player who continues longer in the game, thereby gaining the final sweep.

== Combinations ==
The best combinations are, from high to low:

1. Tricon – three of a kind, ace being the highest, and so on down to the 2.
2. Sequence – three cards of the same suit and sequence, A K Q being the highest, down to 3 2 A.
3. Flush – three cards of the same suit, the highest "point" wins.
4. Pair – two similar cards, the highest pair winning.
5. Point – the greatest value of cards regardless of suit, counting ace 11, courts 10 each, and pips at face value.

In case of a tie between two or more of the players in any round, the highest tricon wins, coming aces first, then kings, queens, down to twos. If the tie happens to be in a sequence, the highest wins, reckoning the A K Q sequence as the best and the 3 2 A sequence as the lowest. If with flushes, the one making the best "point" wins. If pairs, the highest wins and if two hands are alike, then the holder of the highest third card has the preference. With Point a tie is very rare, but if that does happen, the holder of the first highest card different from the opponent's wins.

== Variations ==
=== Pounce ===
There are several variations of the game and pounce, or pounce commerce, seems to be the most popular variation of commerce. In this, if a player has already three similar cards, e.g. three nines, and the fourth nine comes into the pool, they say "pounce" and takes it, thus obtaining a hand of four, which is higher than any hand of three: whenever a pounce occurs, a new card is turned up from the pack.

=== Trade and barter ===
The game is played the same way as in the original commerce, only that there is no "widow". The aim is to have the best commerce hand, that is, a tricon, sequence or point. Starting with the eldest, each in turn must exchange one card by announcing "trade" or "barter". If the player says "trade", they pass a card face down to the dealer and receives another from the stock, paying the dealer one chip for this privilege. If they say "barter", they exchange one card sight unseen with their right-hand neighbour, but without payment. The play continues until one of the players knocks.

If two players show a hand with the same point value, a three-card beats a two-card flush and if still equal, the winning hand is that of the dealer if they are still involved in the play, otherwise that of the first in order of play after the dealer.

=== Trentuno ===
In this variation a 40-card deck is used. The best hand when someone knocks is that of the player containing cards of the same suit totaling 31 points or the nearest below it. Three of a kind is a special hand ranking between 30 and 31 points.

=== Extended commerce ===
This is only applicable to the modern mode of playing the game, which is extended until all the players are satisfied with their hands. They may keep on trading until they all receive cards good enough to stand upon. The great objection to this variation of the game is that it is wearisome because the players have to wait until all the others are satisfied with their cards.

The combinations "pair" and "point" are not recognized.
