= History of poker =

History of the card-game of poker

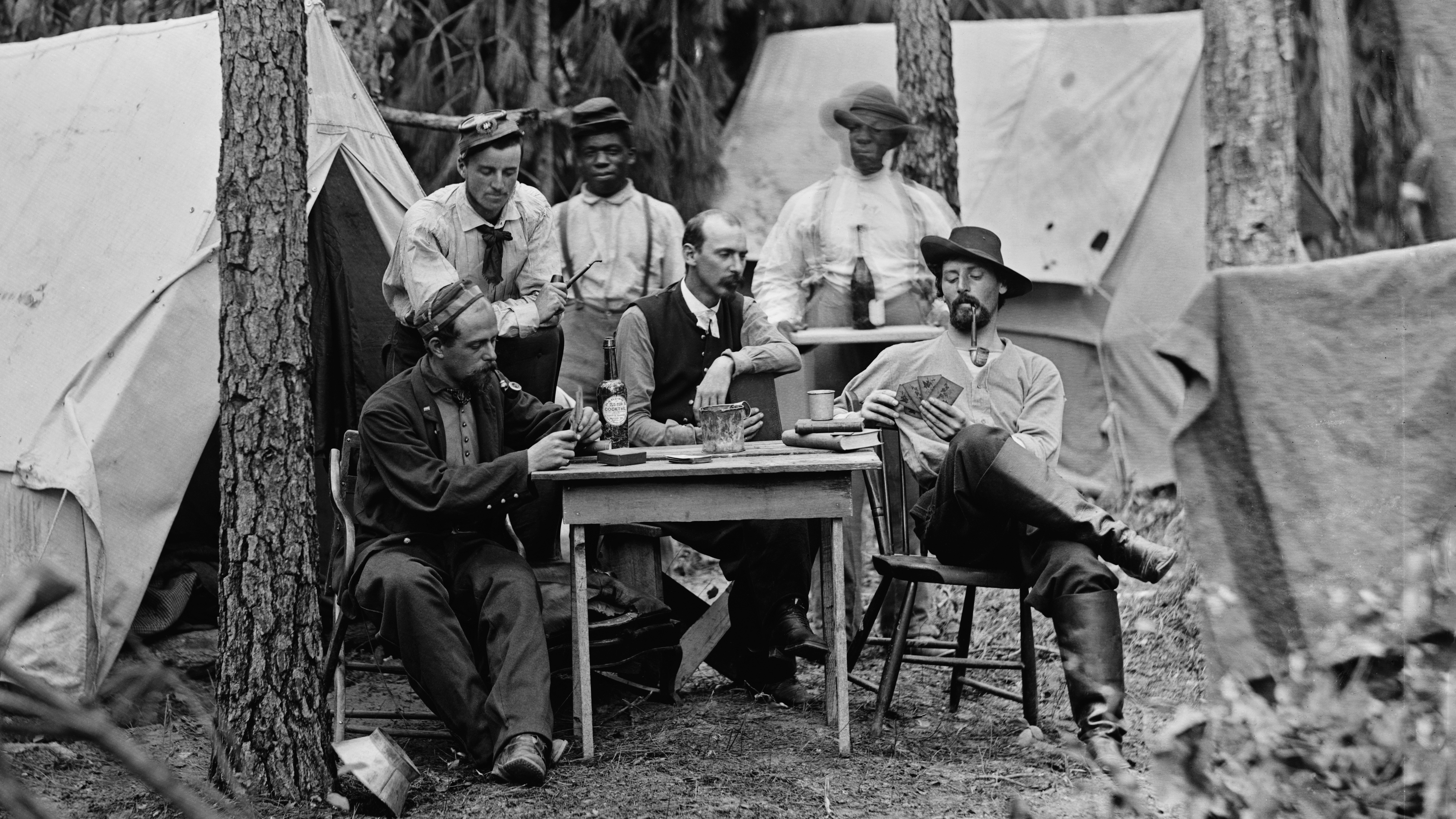
Officers of the 114th Pennsylvania Infantry playing cards in front of tents. Petersburg, Virginia, August 1864

Poker originated in the United States during the late 18th century, drawing on earlier European card games such as the French poque, the German pochen, and the English game brag. By the early 19th century, poker had spread throughout the Mississippi River region and became associated with riverboat gambling and frontier culture. During the 19th century, the game evolved through adoption of the 52-card deck and the introduction of variants such as draw poker, stud poker, and community card poker.

Poker became increasingly popular in casinos and popular culture during the 20th century, particularly after the establishment of the World Series of Poker in 1970. The legalization of hold'em and Omaha in California and the expansion of casino gaming on Native American lands during the late 1980s further increased the game's popularity in the United States.

At the beginning of the 21st century, poker experienced a major increase in international popularity driven by online poker, televised tournaments, and the use of hole-card cameras, which transformed the game into a spectator sport. Tournament circuits such as the World Poker Tour and European Poker Tour contributed to the global expansion of professional poker, while online satellite tournaments greatly increased participation in events such as the World Series of Poker.

== 18th and 19th centuries ==
American soldiers playing poker at Camp McKibbin in Maryland, 1893.

In the 1937 edition of Foster's Complete Hoyle, R. F. Foster wrote: "the game of poker, as first played in the United States, five cards to each player from a twenty-card pack, is undoubtedly the Persian game of As-Nas." There is evidence that a game called poque, a French game similar to poker, was played around the region where poker is said to have originated. Thus the name of the game descended from the French poque, which descended from the German pochen ('to brag as a bluff', lit. 'to knock'). It is commonly regarded as sharing ancestry with the Renaissance game of primero and the French brelan. The English game brag (earlier bragg) clearly descended from brelan and incorporated bluffing (though the concept was known in other games by that time). It is quite possible that all of these earlier games influenced the development of poker as it exists now.

Poker itself originated in the late 18th century, and had probably spread throughout the Mississippi River region by 1800. It was played in a variety of forms, with 52 cards, and included both straight poker and stud. 20 card poker was a variant for two players (it is a common English practice to reduce the deck in card games when there are fewer players). The development of poker is linked to the historical movement that also saw the invention of commercial gambling.

English actor Joseph Cowell reported that the game was played in New Orleans in 1829, with a deck of 20 cards, and four players betting on which player's hand was the most valuable. Jonathan H. Green's book, An Exposure of the Arts and Miseries of Gambling (G. B. Zieber, Philadelphia, 1843), described the spread of the game from there to the rest of the country by Mississippi riverboats, on which gambling was a common pastime. As it spread north along the Mississippi River and to the West during the gold rush, it is thought to have become a part of the frontier pioneer ethos.

Soon after this spread, the full 52-card French deck was used and the flush was introduced. The draw was added prior to 1850 (when it was first mentioned in print in a handbook of games). During the American Civil War, many additions were made including stud poker (the five-card variant), and the straight. Further American developments followed, such as the wild card around 1875, strip poker by 1895, lowball and split-pot poker around 1900, and community card poker games around 1925.

=== Early books discussing poker ===
- Hildreth, J. (1836) Dragoon Campaigns to the Rocky Mountains, Wiley & Long, New York: mentions poker
- Green, Jonathan H. (1843). Exposure of the Arts and Miseries of Gambling, Philadelphia: Zieber
- Cowell, Joe (1844). Thirty Years Passed Among the Players in England and America
- Anners, Henry F. (1845) Hoyle’s Games: refers to Poker or Bluff, 20-deck Poker, and 20-deck Poke
- Bohn, Henry George (1850) New Handbook of Games: stated the rules of poker in print for the first time
- Dick, Willium B. (1866) The American card player
- Trumps (1868) The Modern Pocket Hoyle, New York: Dick & Fitzgerald
- Steinmetz, Andrew (1870) The Gaming Table: Its Votaries and Victims, London: Tinsley Brothers
- Schenck, Robert C. (1872) Rules for Playing Poker, private circulation
- Winterblossom, Henry T. (1875) The Game of Draw Poker Mathematically Illustrated
- Blackbridge (1875) The Complete Card Player

== 20th century ==
Strawberry workers playing poker near Hammond, Louisiana in 1939.

Developments in the 1970s led to poker becoming far more popular than it was before. Modern tournament play became popular in American casinos after the World Series of Poker began, in 1970. Notable champions from these early WSOP tournaments include Johnny Moss, Amarillo Slim, Bobby Baldwin, Doyle Brunson, and Puggy Pearson. Later in the 1970s, the first serious poker strategy books appeared, notably Super/System by Doyle Brunson (ISBN 1-58042-081-8) and Caro's Book of Poker Tells by Mike Caro (ISBN 0-89746-100-2), followed later by The Theory of Poker by David Sklansky (ISBN 1-880685-00-0).

By the 1980s, poker was being depicted in popular culture as a commonplace recreational activity. For example, it was featured in at least 10 episodes of Star Trek: The Next Generation as a weekly event of the senior staff of the fictional ship's crew.

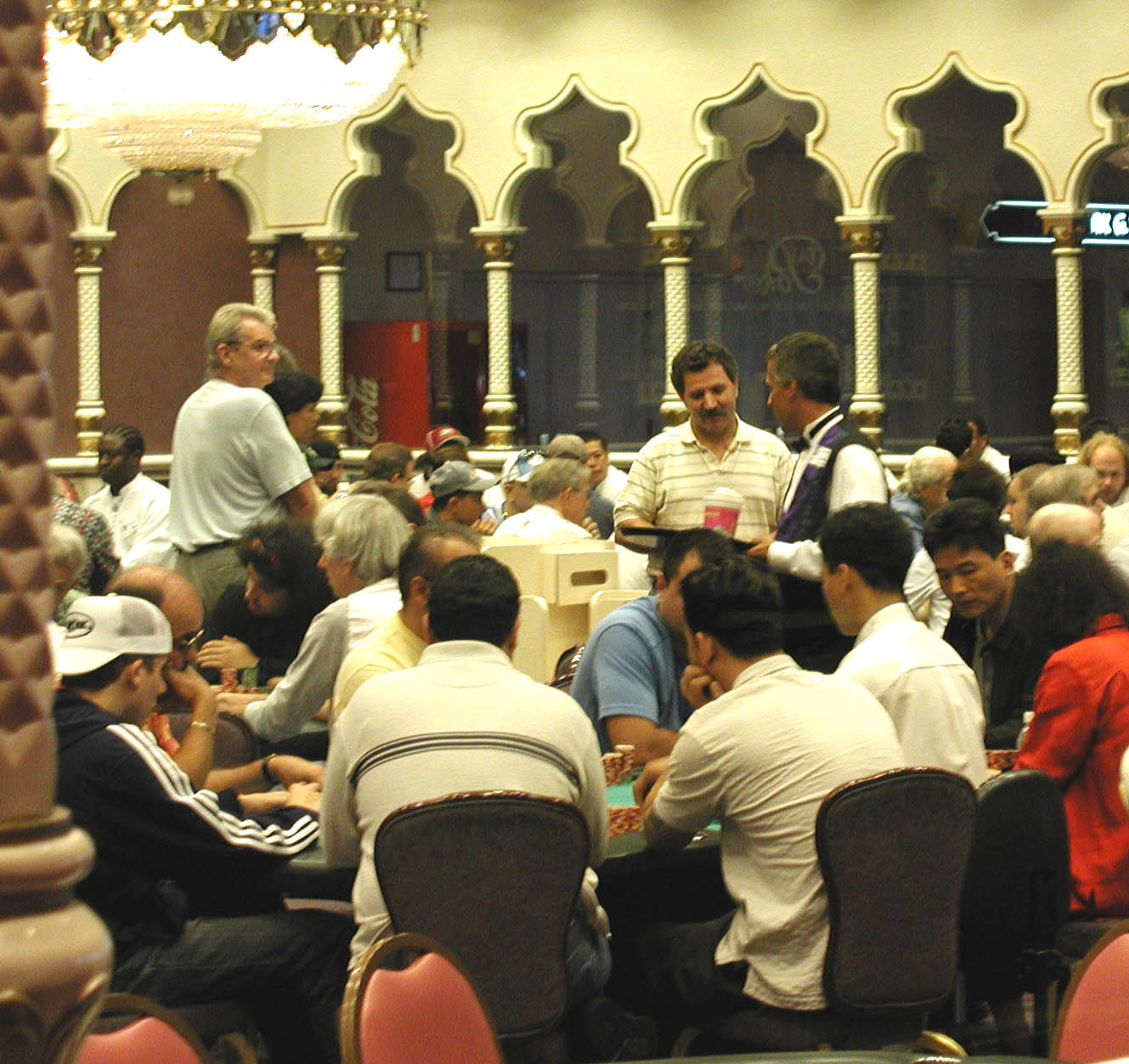
Poker Room at the Trump Taj Mahal, Atlantic City, New Jersey

Two significant events in the late 1980s led to the first poker "boom". In 1987, California legalized the flop games of hold'em and Omaha, as well as stud. Previously only draw games were allowed. While there were more poker games in California than anywhere else before this, the number of games and the action hold'em brought both increased dramatically. Cavernous poker rooms like the Commerce Casino and the Bicycle Club began operating in the LA area. In 1988 Congress passed the Indian Gaming Regulatory Act (IGRA), which legalized casino games on Indian lands. Poker rooms began rapidly opening within a few short years. Limit Texas hold'em was the most widely played game by far in the west, and seven card stud was the most widely played game in the east from the late 1980s until 2003.

In the 1990s, poker and casino gambling spread across the United States, most notably to Atlantic City, New Jersey. In 1998, Planet Poker dealt the first real money online poker game. In 1999, Late Night Poker debuted on British television.

== 21st century ==
Poker's popularity experienced an unprecedented spike at the beginning of the 21st century, largely because of the introduction of online poker and hole-card cameras, which turned the game into a spectator sport. Not only could viewers now follow the action and drama of the game on television, they could also play the game in the comfort of their own home. Broadcasts of poker tournaments such as the World Series of Poker and World Poker Tour brought in huge audiences for cable and satellite TV distributors. Because of the increased coverage of poker events, poker pros became celebrities, with poker fans all over the world entering into tournaments for the chance to compete with them. Television coverage also added an important new dimension to the poker professional's game, as any given hand could now be aired later, revealing information not only to the other players at the table, but to anyone who cared to view the broadcast.

Following the surge in popularity, new poker tours soon emerged, including the World Poker Tour and European Poker Tour, both televised, and the latter sponsored by online poker company PokerStars. Subsequent tours have since been created by PokerStars, such as Latin American Poker Tour and Asia Pacific Poker Tour, as well as other national tours. Beginning in 2003, major poker tournament fields grew dramatically, in part because of the growing popularity of online satellite-qualifier tournaments where the prize is an entry into a major tournament. The 2003 and 2004 World Series of Poker champions, Chris Moneymaker and Greg Raymer, respectively, won their seats to the main event by winning online satellites. In 2009 the International Federation of Poker was founded in Lausanne, Switzerland, becoming the official governing body for poker and promoting the game as a mind sport. In 2011 it announced plans for two new events: The Nations Cup, a duplicate poker team event, to be staged on the London Eye on the banks of the River Thames and "The Table", the invitation-only IFP World Championship, featuring roughly 130 of the world's best poker players, in an event to find the 2011 official "World Champion".

After the passage of the UIGEA in October 2006, attendance at live tournaments as well as participation in live and online cash games initially slowed; however, they are still growing and far more popular today than they were before 2003. The growth and popularity of poker can be seen in the WSOP which had a record 7,319 entrants to the 2010 main event. The only nations in Europe that prohibit live poker are Norway, Poland and Albania, according to Dagbladet in 2011.
