= Brelan =

Card game

- Famous French vying game
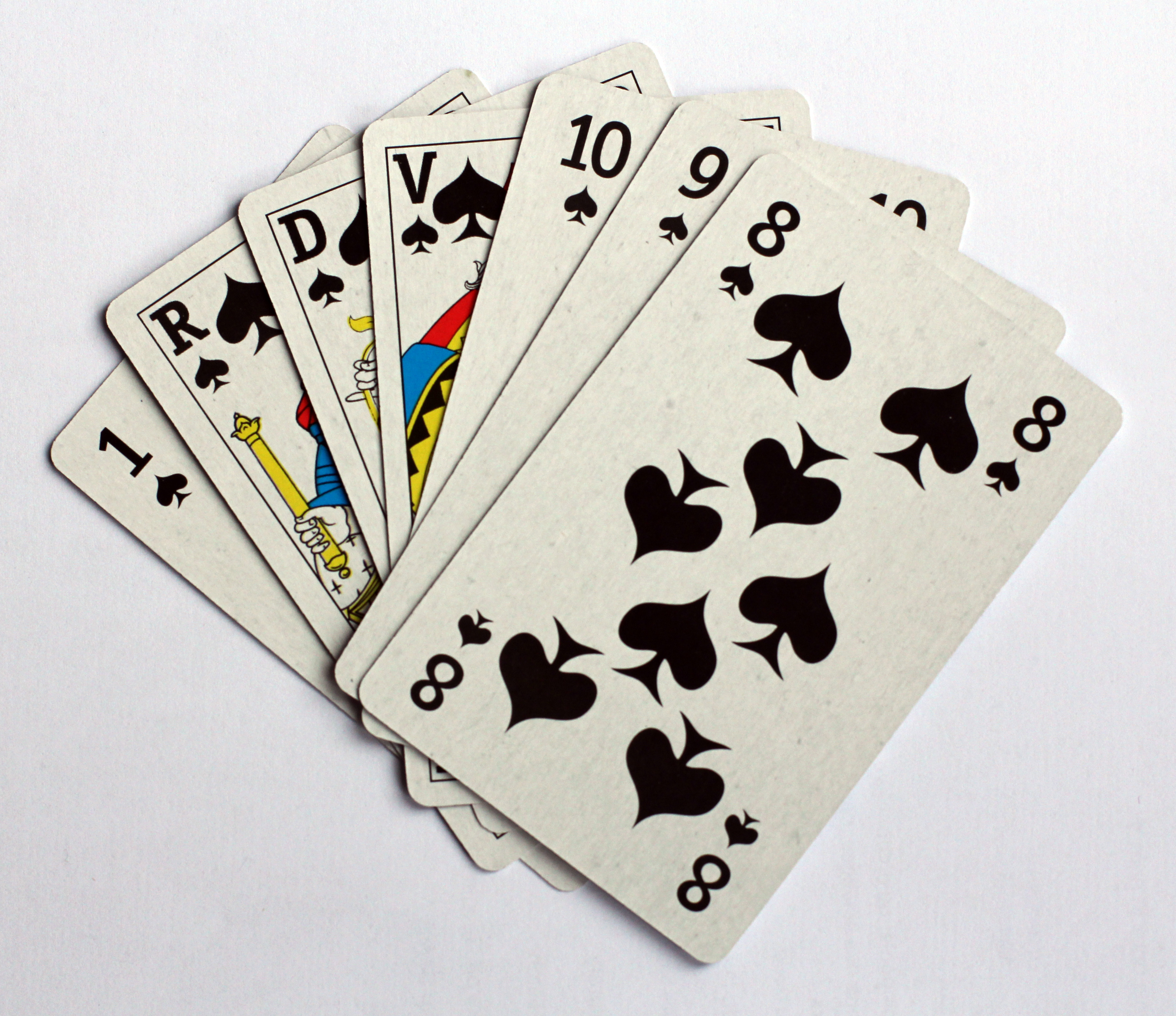
- Suit of Spades from a 28-card French-suited pack
- Origin: France
- Type: Vying
- Players: 3–5
- Cards: 28

Brelan (Old French: brelenc) is a famous French vying game with rapidly escalating bets from the seventeenth to nineteenth century, and hence also a name for a card player, gambler or the name of the place where the game was played. The game is quite similar to the game of Bouillotte, but it is not played anymore.

== History ==
In Old French, a brelan, berlan or berlenc (from High German: bretling = "board, table") was a table on which people played dice. The game of Brelan, even breland, for the name and the rules varied over time, appeared as early as an edict of Lille, France, of 1458, however Depaulis says that "contrary to popular belief, [Brelan] only had the meaning of a card game in the 17th century". In Crébillon's 1763 novel "Le Hasard du coin du feu", the game of "Brelan" takes centre stage. It is often considered as sharing roots with a Renaissance game of Primero and Primo visto. The game of Treschaken is equated to the French bréland in an 1802 Holstein dialect dictionary.

In England, Brelan eventually developed into the game of Brag, also Bragg, where the possibility of bluffing is an important part of the game. It evidently derived from the game of Brelan and later evolved into Bouillotte, which flourished during the French Revolution. Most experts believe that all these earlier card games played an important part in the formation of modern Poker, the most famous representative of a very ancient and always very popular family of games, all of which can be traced even further back to the old French game of Gilet (Gillet, Gile or Trionfetti), which may be considered the most ancient European ancestor of Poker.

== The game ==
Brelan is played by three, four or five players, with a 32-card pack, each receiving 3 cards and a fourth turned from the stock. The best hand is a brelan carre, or four of a kind, made with the aid of the turn-up card on the table, followed by a simple brelan or prial. Brelan favori is a pair royal composed of 2 cards in the hand and the card turned.

In Brelan Cavé, the game is limited to a certain number of rounds, the bouillotte, on the contrary, lasts as long as there are players in the game who still have not lost their stakes.

== See also ==
- Primero
- Brag
- Bouillotte
- Post and Pair
- Put (card game)
- Ambigu
- Gilet

== Literature ==
- Cauquetoux, Anne (2007). Cache-cache et chat perché: les mots du jeu. Le Robert.
- Depaulis, Thierry (1985). "Le Jeu de Cartes: Quelques Regles du Passe" in The Playing-Card. Vol. XIII (3). February 1985. ISSN 0305-2133 pp. 74–80.
- Schütze, Johann Friedrich (1806). Holsteinisches Idiotikon, Part 4, Hammerich, Hamburg-Altona.
- Le Brelan at the Academy of Lost Games (Académie des jeux Oubliés) website.
