= Ruff and honours =

Trick-taking card game

Ruff and Honours
- Precursor to Whist
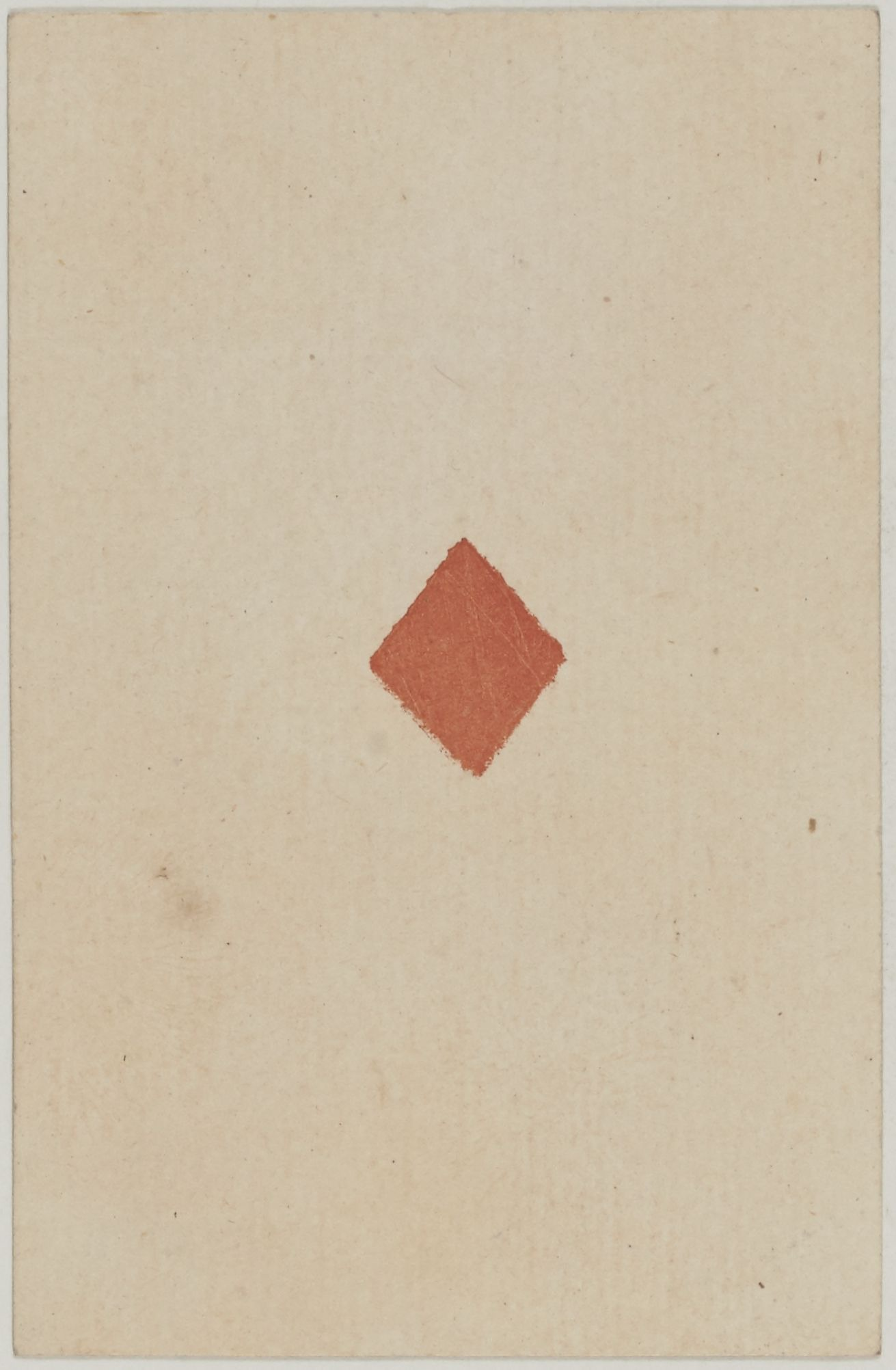
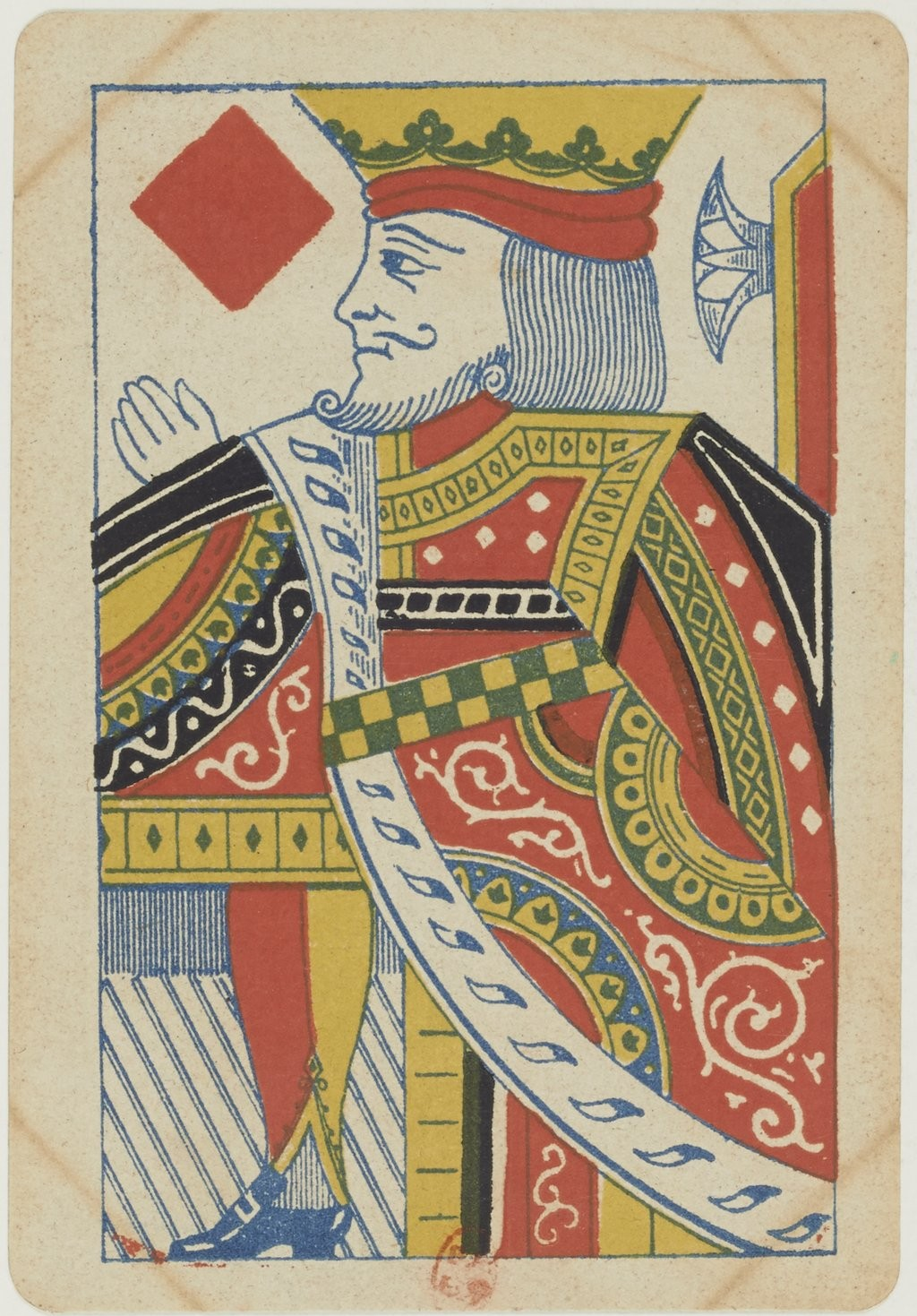
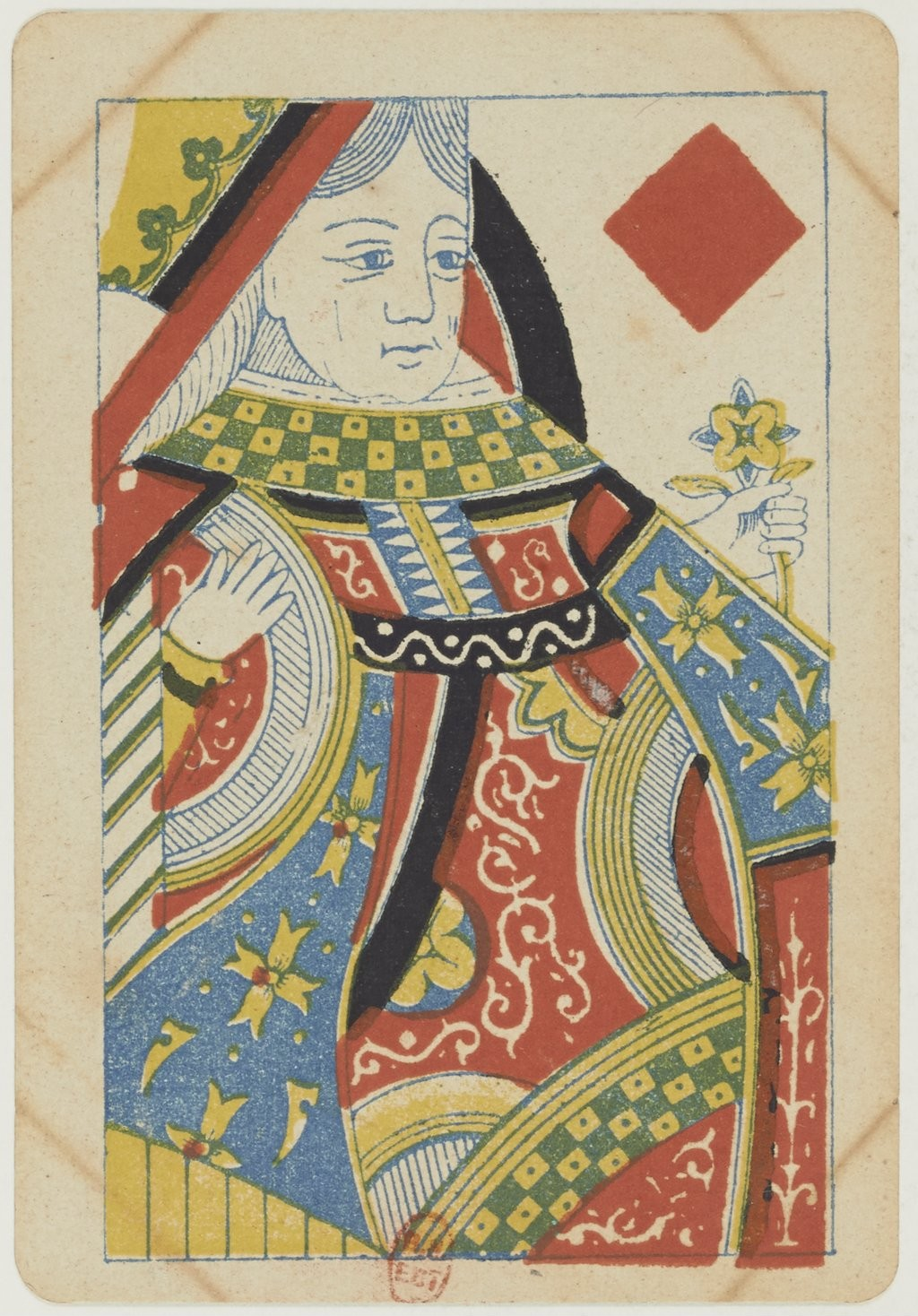
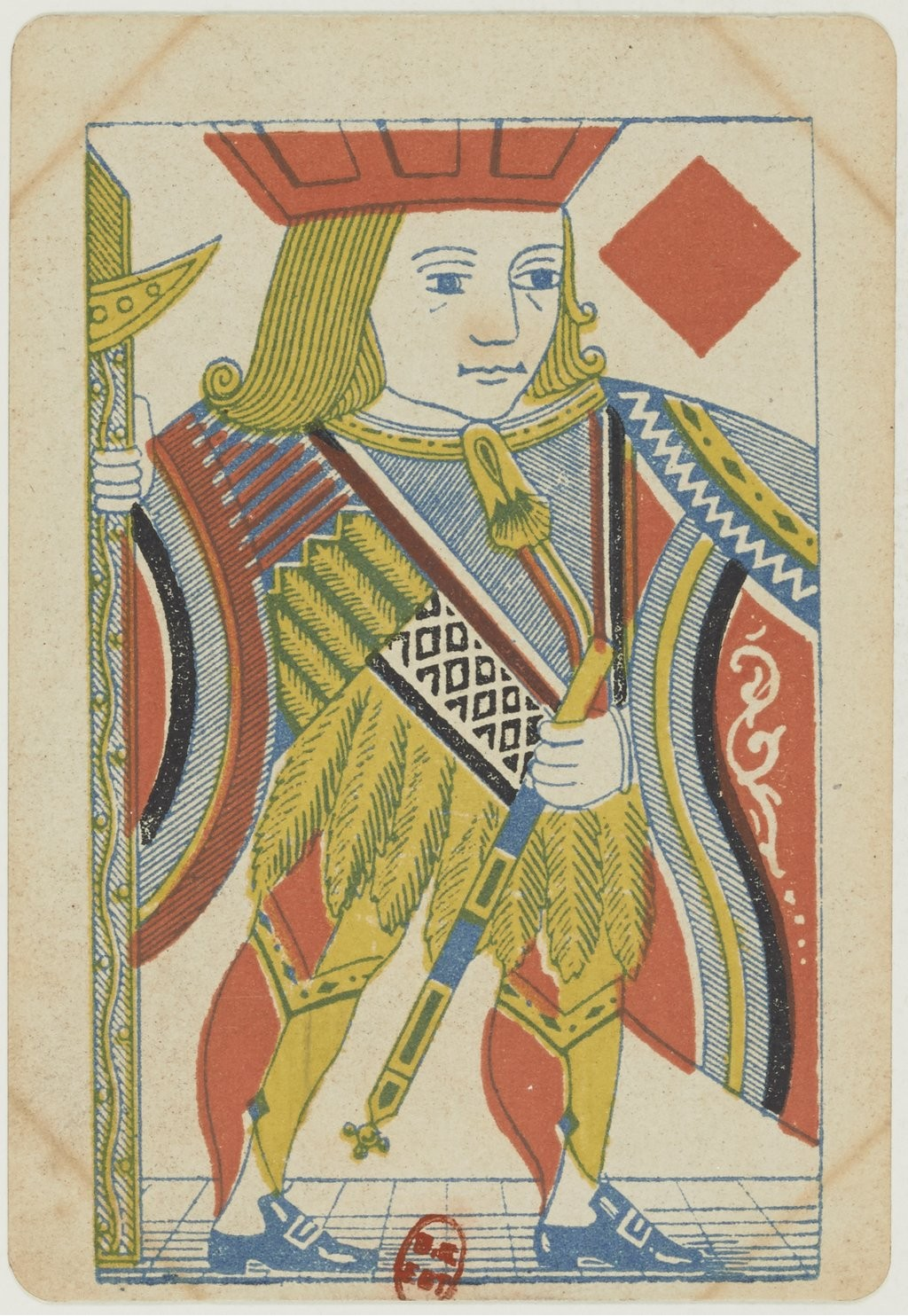
- The Honours when Diamonds are trumps
- Origin: England
- Family: Trick-taking
- Players: 4 (2 x 2)
- Skills: Tactics and Strategy
- Cards: 52
- Deck: English
- Play: Clockwise
- Playing time: 25 min.
- Chance: Medium

Related games
- Triomphe, Whist

Ruff and Honours, Ruffe and Trump or Slamm was an English trick-taking card game that was popular in the 16th and 17th centuries. It was superseded in the 18th century by Whist.

== History ==
Ruff and Honours is covered in Charles Cotton's The Compleat Gamester of 1674 where it is described as being commonly known in all parts of England. At the time Randle Cotgrave thought the name was just a synonym for Trump. The game was also known as Slamm, a less popular form was called Whist, and it was closely related to Ruffe and Trump described by Francis Willughby.

Willughby speculated that there was an earlier simple trick-taking game without the ruff and honours. Cavendish and others state that ruff and honours was a descendant of the French game of Triomphe (→ Middle English triumph → Modern English trump). Triomphe, whose English variant was known as French Ruff, (Note: The rules appear to be slightly different e.g. it was either played by two players or by two teams of two or three players each. See, for example, Cotton (1674).) was a five-card game using a shortened deck, an up-turned trump card and played either in partnership or singlehandedly with 2-7 players.

The earliest reference to a card game called "Triumph" in English is a 1522 translation of a French book. (Note: The chirche of the euyll men and women (1522) is a translation of La Petite Dyablerie dont Lucifer est le chef (1511) which in turn translated Bernardino of Siena's 1423 sermon. However, the "Triumph" mentioned is actually Trionfi, a different game. Trionfi was not in Bernardino's original sermon but in an interpolation added in 1472.) The earliest reference of "Triumph" being played in England is in a sermon by Hugh Latimer in 1529. The earliest mention of Triomphe goes back to France in the 1480s.

Ruff originates from an obscure 15th-century Italian game known as Ronfa and probably entered the English language through the French equivalent of Ronfle – first recorded in 1458 – where it meant "point", as formerly in the game of Piquet. By the late 16th-century, due to confusion by English players, ruff acquired its English meaning of "to trump".

== Features ==
The game has been reconstructed from Cotton's "ruff and honours" and Willughby's similar "ruffe and trump".

- Four players form two teams of two, partners sitting opposite one another.
- Played with a standard 52-card French deck with cards ranked AKQJ1098765432.
- 12 cards are dealt to each player, four at a time.
- The remaining four cards become the stock, the top card of which is exposed to determine the trump suit.
- The holder of the Ace of trump, or Dealer if the Ace of Trumps is exposed, "ruffs" by picking up the stock and discarding any four cards.
- Play begins with the person to the dealer's left. The player leads a card and all other players follow suit if possible. A player who cannot follow suit may play any card. The trick is won by the highest ranked card, i.e. by the highest trump card and if no trump card is played, by the highest card in suit led.
- Twelve tricks are played as normal, scoring one point for each trick the partners have in excess of six.
- Honours in the partnership's hands are usually scored at the end. Two points for three honours; four points for all four honours (AKQJ of trumps).
- Except on eight points, honours are declared immediately to end the game. One can declare three or more honours in your hand, or with two honours call "Can-ye?" and if your partner has an honour score them.
- Deals continue until one side wins by reaching nine points.

== Literature ==
- In Antony and Cleopatra (Act IV, Scene XIV) by William Shakespeare, Antony uses a Trump metaphor: "[she has] Pack'd cards with Caesar, and false-play'd my glory; Unto an enemy's triumph."
- A Woman Killed with Kindness and The Fair Maid of the West, both by Thomas Heywood, Katharine Lee Bates 1917 ISBN 1-4446-4519-6

== See also ==
- Triomphe
- Primero
- Primo visto
- Whist
- Contract bridge
