= Tricon =

Tricon may refer to:

- Tricon Garage, an automobile racing team formerly known as David Gilliland Racing
- Tricon Global Restaurants, a spin-off company of PepsiCo that, after a merger, became known as Yum! Brands
- Tricon Residential, formerly Tricon Capital, a Canadian real estate company
- Tricon, an alternate name for the 24th World Science Fiction Convention, a convention held in three cities in 1966
- Tricon Award, an award presented to Lady Gaga at the 2020 MTV Video Music Awards
- Tricon Boston Consulting Corporation, a company that produced power stations for wind power in Pakistan
- Tricon container, an intermodal shipping container one-third the size of a standard 20-foot container
- Tricon, a consortium related to the Senator Lines shipping company
- Tricon Films & Television, a production company that produced content such as the television series Cock'd Gunns, Counterfeit Cat, and Go Away, Unicorn!
- Tricon systems, an industrial safety-shutdown technology system produced by the company Triconex
- Tricon Design, a company involved in the design of the Doha Metro and the German Vossloh G2000 BB locomotive
- Tricon, a logo used by BBC Three
- Vincent Tricon, the editor of the film Divines and director of Daphné Patakia
- Tricon, the term for hands having three-of-a-kind in the card game Commerce, Gé, Point, Flux et Sequence, or Gilet
- Tricon, a term for having three or four cards of the same denomination in the card game Hoc Mazarin
- Tricon International Airlines, a defunct airline of the United States that operated a flight that crashed at Dallas Love Field in 1973
- SA Tricon, a company that operates a garment factory in the Cahul District of Moldova
- Bell Atlantic-Tricon Leasing Corporation, a company that owned the Aladdin hotel and casino in Las Vegas, Nevada
