= Teen patti =

South Asian gambling card game

Teen Patti
- The highest hand in teen patti is three aces
- Origin: Punjabi
- Alternative names: 3 Patti
- Type: Gambling
- Family: cards
- Players: optional (maximum 10)
- Skills: Counting
- Cards: 52
- Deck: Anglo-French
- Play: Counter-clockwise
- Playing time: unlimited
- Chance: Medium

Related games
- Three-card brag, Poker

Teen patti (Hindi) or Tre Patte (Punjabi), (meaning 'three cards' in English) is a gambling card game. Teen Patti originated in India and is popular throughout South Asia. It originated in the English game of three-card brag, with influences from poker. It is also called flush or flash in some areas.

The game has its advantages and a culturally determined tie to Janmashtami, the celebration of Krishna’s birth.

== Betting ==
There is usually an ante or boot amount put on the table (the pot). The betting then starts by the player next to the dealer.

=== Loose versus tight play ===
In teen patti, "loose" and "tight" refers to a player's general tendency to play hands beyond the first round or to fold them quickly. There is no commonly accepted threshold in terms of a ratio or percentage of hands played, but a "tight" player will often choose to fold weaker hands, while a "loose" player will bet on more of these hands and thus play more hands to the showdown.

=== Entry fee ===
There is usually an ante or boot amount put on the table (the pot). This ante may be in the form of an equal amount put by each player, or a single larger amount put by one player (usually on a rotation basis).

An ante is a forced bet in which each player places an equal amount of money or chips into the pot before the deal begins. Often this is either a single unit (a one-value or the smallest value in play) or some other small amount; a percentage such as half or one-quarter of the minimum bet is also common. An ante paid by each player ensures that a player who folds every round will lose money (though slowly), thus providing each player with an incentive, however small, to play the hand rather than toss it in when the opening bet reaches them.

Antes discourage extremely tight play. Without the ante, a player who has not paid a blind can toss in his hand at no cost to him; the ante ensures that doing so too often is a losing proposition. With antes, more players stay in the hand, which increases pot size and makes for more interesting play.

In games where the acting dealer changes each turn, it is not uncommon for the players to agree that the dealer (or some other position relative to the dealer or the button) provides the ante for each player. This simplifies betting, but causes minor inequities if other players come and go. During such times, the player can be given a special button indicating the need to pay an ante to the pot (known as "posting") upon their return.

=== Post ===
A player who is temporarily away from his seat (e.g. for drinks or a restroom/bathroom break) and misses antes is also required to post to re-enter the game. They must pay the applicable ante to the pot for the next hand they will participate in. In this case, the amount to be posted is the amount of the ante at the time the player missed them.

Posting is usually not required if the player who would otherwise post happens to be in the ante. This is because the advantage that would otherwise be gained by missing the ante, that of playing several hands before having to pay ante, is not the case in this situation. It is therefore common for a new player to lock up a seat and then wait several hands before joining a table, or for a returning player to sit out several hands until the ante comes back around, so that he may enter in the ante and avoid paying the post. For this same reason, only one ante can be accumulated by the player; old missed antes are removed when the ante returns to that player's seat because the player was never in any position to gain from missing the antes.

=== Blind ===
A blind or blind bet is usually a forced bet placed into the pot by one or more players before the deal begins, in a way that simulates bets made during play. The most common use of blinds as a betting structure calls for two blinds: the player after the dealer blinds about half of what would be a normal bet (small blind), and the next player blinds what would be a whole bet (big blind). This two-blind structure, sometimes with antes, is the dominating structure of play. Sometimes only one blind (half or whole bet) is used (often informally by the dealer as a "price of winning" the previous hand).

Besides the forced blind bet, players may optionally play blind and put an optional blind bet to the pot. Blind players may place bets that are at least half of the current level of bet by a seen player. Seen players have to place a bet that is at least double that of the current level of bet by a blind player.

Some players set a limit on how many times a player can bet blind- for example, one could bet blind on his first three turns, one could bet blind on his first two turns.

=== Call and raise (chaal) ===
After the ante and the forced blind bet(s), the regular betting starts with the next player putting his bet amount to the pot.

The total bet can be divided into two components - the call and the raise, both being usually called as Chaal. Each player has to place a bet that is at least equal to the previous player's bet, with the option of raising the bet. This bet then becomes the (new) current level of bet (Chaal). Usually there is a limit imposed to the raise, such that the total bet amount (with the call and the raise) cannot exceed twice that of the previous player's bet. Also, the bet should be in even amounts (2,4,6,8...), especially when there is one player still in the game as Blind player. It is because the player playing blind plays half of the normal bet, and odd amounts can't be halved.

It is very important to understand that this betting structure is different than Poker, as every time the bet is new (disregarding of how much amount was previously bid.) Let's say, one player bet an amount of 2 and second player raises it up to 4, now the first person would have to put additional 4 into the pot to make a call or would have an option to raise the bet up to 8 (which is different in case of Poker where the second player adds 2 more to bring his bet to the level 4).

== Limits ==
Betting limits apply to the amount a player may bet or raise, and come in four common forms: fixed limit, spread limit, pot limit, and no limit.

Note: The limits may be applied to the raise or the bet.

All such games have a minimum bet as well as the stated maximums, and also commonly a betting unit, which is the smallest denomination in which bets can be made.

=== Fixed ===
In a game played with a fixed-limit betting structure, the maximum raise amount generally equals the last bet amount (current level of bet). Thus, the maximum raise amount is equal to the call amount, and the maximum bet is double that of the last bet.

=== Spread ===
A game played with a spread-limit betting structure allows a player to raise any amount within a specified maximum (subject to other betting rules).

For example, a game with a "$1000 spread-limit" allows each player to call and then raise up to a maximum of $1000.

A simpler approach is to bet up to a maximum amount equal to the spread-limit. So in the above example, the maximum bet (call + raise) is limited to $1000.

=== Pot ===
A game played with a pot-limit betting structure allows any player to raise up to an amount equal to the size of the whole pot before the raise.

For example, let us assume that there is an ante of $50 and a single forced blind bet of $10 in the pot at the start of the regular betting round, and all subsequent players are seen/have seen their cards. The next player may bet the minimum amount of $20 (double that of the last blind bet of $10). This player may also raise up to $80 (as there is now $50 + $10 + $20 = $80 in the pot) to bring his total bet (also the new current level of bet) to $20 + $80 = $100. If he does in fact bets $100, the total amount of the pot is $160, and the next player may call (put the minimum bet of) $100, and raise up to $260 for a total bet of $360 (after calling the $100 bet, the total amount of the pot is $260, so he may raise up to $260). The next player would then be entitled to call at $360 and raise up to $880 (after calling $360, the pot would contain $880, thus he may raise $880).

A simpler approach is to bet up to a maximum amount in the pot. So in the above example, the first seen player may bet a minimum of $20 and a maximum of $60. If he does bet the maximum, the next player may bet a minimum of $60 to a maximum of $120. If he bets the maximum, the next player would then be entitled to bet a minimum of $120 and a maximum of $240. Note: In this example, for the later bets, the maximum bet is twice that of minimum bet because of the chosen ante and forced blind bet amounts. For other combinations, this relationship may not hold.

=== No-limit ===
A game played with a no-limit betting structure allows each player to raise the bet by any amount.

== Moves ==
=== Blind play ===
When somebody plays blind, he has not seen his cards and places his bet by guessing the strength of his card combination and of other players. He should place a higher bet if he has faith in his luck and his card combination will be stronger than other players. If somebody wants to play it safe and not take risks, he should place bet for a smaller amount.A person can ask for show if playing blind

=== Play (chaal phase) ===
Anybody can choose to see their cards at any time and then place a bet (when it's their turn) depending on how strong he thinks his card combination is. He can pack if he thinks his card combination is not strong enough. Though he can pack out of turn, it's not considered courteous to do so. There is a variation to this rule in which players are only allowed to see and fold their cards when it's their turn.

=== Sideshow, backshow, and compromise ===
If somebody have seen his cards, he can ask for a sideshow after placing his bet. He can ask for a sideshow with the previous player (who placed the last bet). Hence sideshows are also referred to as backshows. Sideshows are only permitted if no player is playing and if the player request for the third time no one can deny it and to whom it been requested the player have to show the cards

The player can either accept or decline others sideshow request. Player may want to decline sideshow if one is trying to bluff way through, in that case one is likely to fold due to poor hand when two hands are compared. Player may also want to decline sideshow request if one is holding a strong hand and/or would want pot money to increase to make game more interesting.

If the sideshow request is accepted, the two players involved privately compare their cards, and the player with the lower hand is forced to fold. If the hands are equal, the player who asked for the sideshow is forced to fold.

If the sideshow is refused, the player requesting the sideshow must bet to stay in the game or fold.

=== Show ===
The betting will go on like this until one of two things happens:

- All but one player pack. The sole remaining player wins the money in the pot, regardless of what cards he or she holds.
- All but two players pack. In this case, during his or her turn, one player pays for a "show". At this point, both players' cards are exposed and compared and the higher-ranking hand wins the pot.

The following are the rules for a "show":

- Seen player can ask for a show with blind player for four times the current bet.
- If both players are seen then either may ask for a show by paying two times the current bet.

Note: A blind player cannot ask for a show or sideshow.

In most modern games, especially where the stakes or bets are high, shows are paid for at the current bet level. Also, while a blind player cannot ask (nor can be asked) for a sideshow, the blind player can ask for a show. For a show, a player can choose not to show, if they give up the pot. Ultimately, all rules are discussed and agreed by all players before the game begins.

== Ranking of hands ==
Trio (trail)

Straight flush, Pure Run, Shahi (pure sequence)

Run, First (sequence)

Run, Langdi (sequence)

Run, Straight (sequence)

Flush (colour)

Pair

High card

Examples of poker hand categories in descending order

There are two ways teen patti is played. One is by using a standard 52-card deck and another is by adding the two Joker cards, which are used as wild cards. The object of the game is to have the best three-card hand and to maximize the pot before the showdown. Any hand of a higher category beats any hand of a lower category. If two players have the same combination then the pot is split between the two no matter which of the two players asked for showdown. In another variation, where the suits hold ranks, the player with the higher suit wins the pot.

The categories are ranked as follows:

Three of a kind (trio)

Three of the same cards. Three aces are the highest and three twos are the lowest trio.

Straight flush (pure sequence)

Pure sequence is also known as Shahi and Pure run.

Three consecutive cards of the same suit.

The order of ranking from highest (defined by highest card in the sequence) to lowest is:A-K-Q, A-2-3, K-Q-J, Q-J-10, and so on down to 4–3–2. A wraparound (K-A-2) is not considered a straight flush, but is a valid flush.

Straight (sequence)

Sequence is also known as run.

Three consecutive cards not all in the same suit. A straight is also referred as a round or sequence.

The highest to lowest ranking is (as with straight flushes): A-K-Q, A-2-3, K-Q-J, Q-J-10 and so on down to 4–3–2. As with straight flushes, K-A-2 is not a valid hand.

Flush (colour) All the 3 cards are of same suit. If two players both have flushes, the player with the high card wins; if they match, then the next highest card is compared, then the third card if needed. If two players have the same card values, then the hands are ranked by suit, with spades first and clubs last.

Pair (double) Two cards of the same rank. Between two pairs, the one with the higher value is the winner. If the pairs are of equal value, the value of the third card decides the winner. Therefore, the lowest pair is 2-2-3 and the highest is A-A-K.

No pair (high card) If two players share a common high card, then rest of the cards are compared based upon their values.

=== Probabilities ===
The probabilities of the various ranking combinations are described below. All these probabilities are described for 52-card teen patti, without the two Joker cards. In Joker versions, the probabilities change widely, most importantly for pairs.

There are 52 cards in the deck. The sequence in which the cards are dealt does not matter, it is the combination of the three cards that matters. The total number of combinations of any elements, taken r at a time, from a set of n elements is given by the combination formula nCvar>r (COMBIN(n,r) in Microsoft Excel and compatible spreadsheets). Thus, the total number of three-card hands, from a deck of 52 cards, is calculated by the formula 52C3 = 22,100.

Hand	Frequency	Probability	Cumulative Probability	Odds
Three of a kind/trio	52	0.24%	0.24%	424.00:1
Straight flush/pure sequence	48	0.22%	0.45%	459.42:1
Straight/sequence	720	3.26%	3.71%	29.69:1
Flush/colour	1096	4.96%	8.67%	19.16:1
Pair	3744	16.94%	25.61%	4.90:1
No pair/high card	16440	74.39%	100.00%	0.34:1
Total	22,100	100.00%	100.00%	0.00:1

Although the probability of being dealt a pure sequence is slightly less than that of a trio, trios are considered higher hands in most versions of the game. Because of this variance from strict rarity, a popular house rule is to treat 2-3-5 of the same suit as a straight flush, thereby increasing the number of possible straight flushes to 52, the same as a trio, bringing the probabilities even.

== Variations ==
Teen patti has many variant versions. A combination of variations may be played simultaneously.

=== Best-of-four ===
Each player is dealt four cards from which they must make the best possible three-card hand.

=== Lowball (mufliss) ===
Similar to lowball in poker, the rankings of the card combinations are reversed: The least ranking combination has the highest rank and vice versa.

Example: If A-Q-3 and A-K-2 are compared in normal game A-K-2 is the winner <both have A but K is higher than Q> but in lowball A-Q-3 is the winner <both have A but Q is lower than K>. 3-2-5 is the best hand in this game.

=== Wild draw ===
The dealer pulls out one card at random after dealing and nominates all other cards of the same rank as wild cards.

=== Low wild ===
Each player's lowest-ranking card (and all other cards of that same rank) are wild cards in that player's hand only. If the two lowest cards are a pair then that pair is considered as two wild cards.

=== High wild ===
Each player's highest-ranking card (and all other cards of that same rank) are wild cards in that player's hand only. If the two highest cards are a pair then that pair is considered as two wild cards.

=== Two-lowest wild ===
Each player is dealt four cards and the two lowest cards taken together forms a virtual wild card in that player's hand only. If the two lowest cards are a pair then that pair may be considered as a single wild card. In this version, if the two middle rank cards are a pair, then the player does not have any wild cards.

=== Bust card draw ===
The dealer pulls out one card at random after dealing and nominates all other cards of the same rank as bust cards. Any player holding any of the bust cards has to fold.

=== Stud ===
This variation is similar to stud poker. Each player receives a preset mix of combination of face-down and face-up cards. The cards dealt face down to each individual player are called hole cards (which in poker gave rise to the common English expression "ace in the hole", suggesting that one has something valuable that is not apparent to others). The cards dealt face-up are called street cards.

Different versions in this variation include three-card stud, where each player is dealt two face-down cards and one face-up card, and five-card stud (not to be confused with the poker variant of the same name), where each player is dealt two face-down cards and three face-up cards; some versions of five-card may require players to compulsorily select one face-down cards and any two face-up cards to make a three-card hand.

=== Community ===
Players are dealt an incomplete hand of face-down cards, and then a number of face-up community cards are dealt to the center of the table, each of which can be used by one or more of the players to make a three-card hand. This variant was inspired by Texas hold 'em poker.

Versions are:

- Three-card community: Each player is dealt two face-down cards followed by one face-up community card.
- Five-card community: Each player is dealt two face-down cards followed by three face-up community cards. Some versions of this game may require players to compulsorily select any one face-down cards and any two face-up cards to make a three-card hand.

=== Draw ===
A complete hand is dealt to each player and, usually before (or after, but not both) betting, players are allowed to change their hand by discarding unwanted cards and being dealt new ones. Players may have to "purchase"/"buy" the new cards by putting a prearranged amount into the pot for each new card. Another version of draw allows players up to three chances to buy and change their hand, one card at a time, in the first three rounds of betting.

=== High-low split ===
In traditional teen patti games, the player with the best traditional hand wins the whole pot. Lowball variations award the pot to the lowest hand. High-low split games are those in which the pot is divided between the player with the best traditional hand (called the high hand) and the player with the low hand. In this variation, there could be multiple players remaining in play at "show," unlike the traditional or lowball where there are usually only two players left at show. There are no sideshows and players may opt out from betting by folding. Usually there are three or four mutually agreed upon rounds of betting where no player opts out, before having the showdown. Also, there is a limit of six-to-ten rounds of betting at the end of which there is a compulsory showdown.

There are two common methods for playing high-low split games, called "declaration" and "cards speak". In a declaration game, each player declares (verbally or using markers such as chips) whether he wishes to contest for the high hand or the low hand. The lowest hand among those who declared low wins that half of the pot, and the highest hand among those who declared high wins that half. In a cards speak game, all players simply reveal their cards at show and the hands are evaluated by all players; high hand wins half of the pot and low hand wins the other half.

In the event more than one player ties for either high or low, the pot can be further split into quarters or smaller fractions. For example, if one player has the high hand on show and two other players tie for the best low hand, the high hand wins half of the pot and each low hand wins only a quarter of the pot.

It is common, especially in cards speak games, to require a certain hand value or better to win the low half of the pot, called a "qualifier". For example, in an "eight or better to qualify low" game, a player with an eight-high hand (or lower such as seven-high) is entitled to win the low half of the pot (assuming his hand defeats all other low hands), but a player with a 10-high or 9-high hand cannot win, even if his hand is the lowest. In this case, the high hand wins the entire pot. There is generally no qualifier to win high, although one common variant is "any pair/no pair", where a hand of at least a pair is required to win high and any hand with no pair is required to win low.

=== Kiss, miss, and bliss ===
Five cards are distributed to each player. In this version, a player can make three types of "virtual" wild/joker cards:

- Kiss: A numerically sequential pair is considered a single virtual wild card; e.g., A,2 or 8,9 or J,Q – but K,A isn't considered wild.
- Miss: A pair missing the card that would form a sequence is considered a single virtual wild card; e.g., A,3 or 8,10 or J,K – but K,2 isn't considered wild.
- Bliss: A pair having two same-numbered cards (regardless of suit or colour) is considered a single virtual wild card; e.g., 8,8 or A,A.

A player can make any combination of the above three as a part of their game and consider it as virtual wild card, but a player can use each type of combination only once in a hand. For example, a player may end up having one individual card, a kiss, and a miss), while another might have an individual card plus a kiss and a bliss, but it would not be possible to use two kisses with an individual card.

=== Cobra ===
Each player is dealt a single card. All players put in a pre-determined amount into the pot. All players, without seeing, pick their card and place it on their forehead. This way, each player can see everyone else's cards. No player can see their own card. This variation is usually played as the very last hand of the game.

=== Blind (kaana) king and jack ===
Each player is dealt three or four cards. In this variation, any king or jack who has a side profile and only one eye visible (e.g., the king of diamonds, the jack of spades) is considered a wild card. This round generally begins when someone gets a trio, and is continued until some player has asked for a show to the player holding the applicable king or jara

== See also ==
- Primero
