= Crash (card game) =

British card game

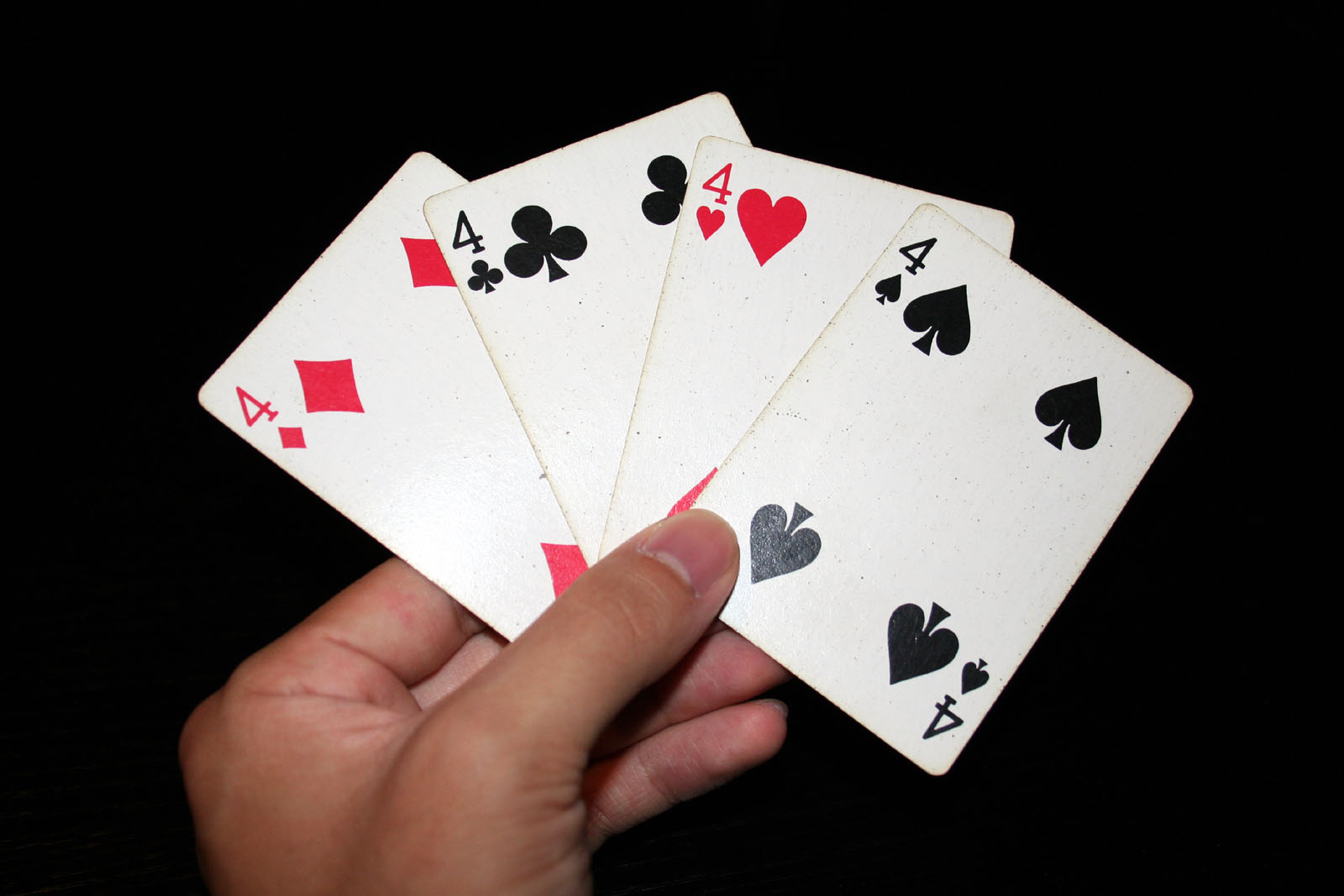
- Origin: England
- Type: Matching
- Players: 2-4
- Cards: 52
- Deck: Anglo-American
- Rank (high→low): A K Q J 7 6 5 4 3 2
- Play: Clockwise
- Playing time: 10 min.
- Chance: Low-Moderate

Related games
- Brag

Crash is a British card game extension of Nine-card Brag and indeed is sometimes known as Thirteen Card Brag. In Crash, there is no betting, as in Brag, but rather players aim to reach a total of 15 points, gained over successive deals.

== Distribution ==
Crash is played over much of northern England and Wales from Coventry and Burton-on-Trent in the south to the counties of Cumbria and Yorkshire in the north, also in Welshpool in north central Wales and in South Wales. It is also recorded in Plymouth and Edinburgh, where it is called Crackers.

== Rules ==
Crash has many rule variations.

=== Deal and play ===
Players are dealt 13 cards each and must sort their hand into 4 Brag hands of three cards, or if you are lucky enough, in 3 sets of 4 of a kind, discarding the last remaining card. The hands rank as in Brag with the highest ranking hand being, 3 threes. All other hands are the same. Once the players have sorted their hands, each plays their highest ranked hand, and the player playing the highest gains one point. If hands are tied, no-one scores. Players then play their second-best hands, then their third best, then final hands. Note that not all players accept 'high card' hands, and many do not accept 'pairs', which means that it is quite common for a player not to have four hands.

=== 'Crashing' ===
Crashing in this game involve a person predicting they are going to win all four hands and calling 'crash'. If they win all after predicting they will win all four hands, usually there is a financial reward. If a player wins all four hands without calling crash, they usually receive a 50 pence reward. If they call crash and do not win all four hands, they usually have to pay a financial penalty of 50 pence to each player (a cost of 50p to £1.50 depending on whether it is 2, 3 or 4 players playing).

== Gambling ==
The game is very popular in pubs and bars in the UK, and sometimes gambling is involved. All these rules depend on the rules of the house:

- An entry fee is used into a prize kitty and all players pay regardless of if they play or not commonly £1.
- If more than 4 players are involved, every player gets dealt a card, and if they receive a jack they enter the game, then stop receiving cards. This goes on until all players are dealt jacks.
- At the end of the game, every player except the winner must pay the winner for each point not earned (usually 20p).
- If a player crashes then the money for each point not earned is doubled, i.e. player B won on a crash, then Player C owes £2.80; however, this win can only be earned if a player needs more than 4 points to win.
- If a player receives 4 of a kind in a hand, then as long as he has the best hand in a go, in the event of 2 or more players receiving a 4 of a kind, then they receive half the entry bet off each player in the game, usually 50p.

== Hand ranking ==
The Highest ranking hand is 4 of a kind starting with 4 fours followed by Aces, Kings etc. Next it's 3 of a kind starting with Threes, Aces, Kings and so on. After this, a Run of the same suit, also called Bouncer (all the way through is worth more than a regular run), Ace, 2, 3 the highest Run, followed by Ace, King, Queen and so on. Then a mixed run ranked as previous. Penultimately flush (any 3 cards of the same suit), Finally, pairs are the lowest hand

== See also ==
- Brag
- Chor voli
