= Primo visto =

Card game

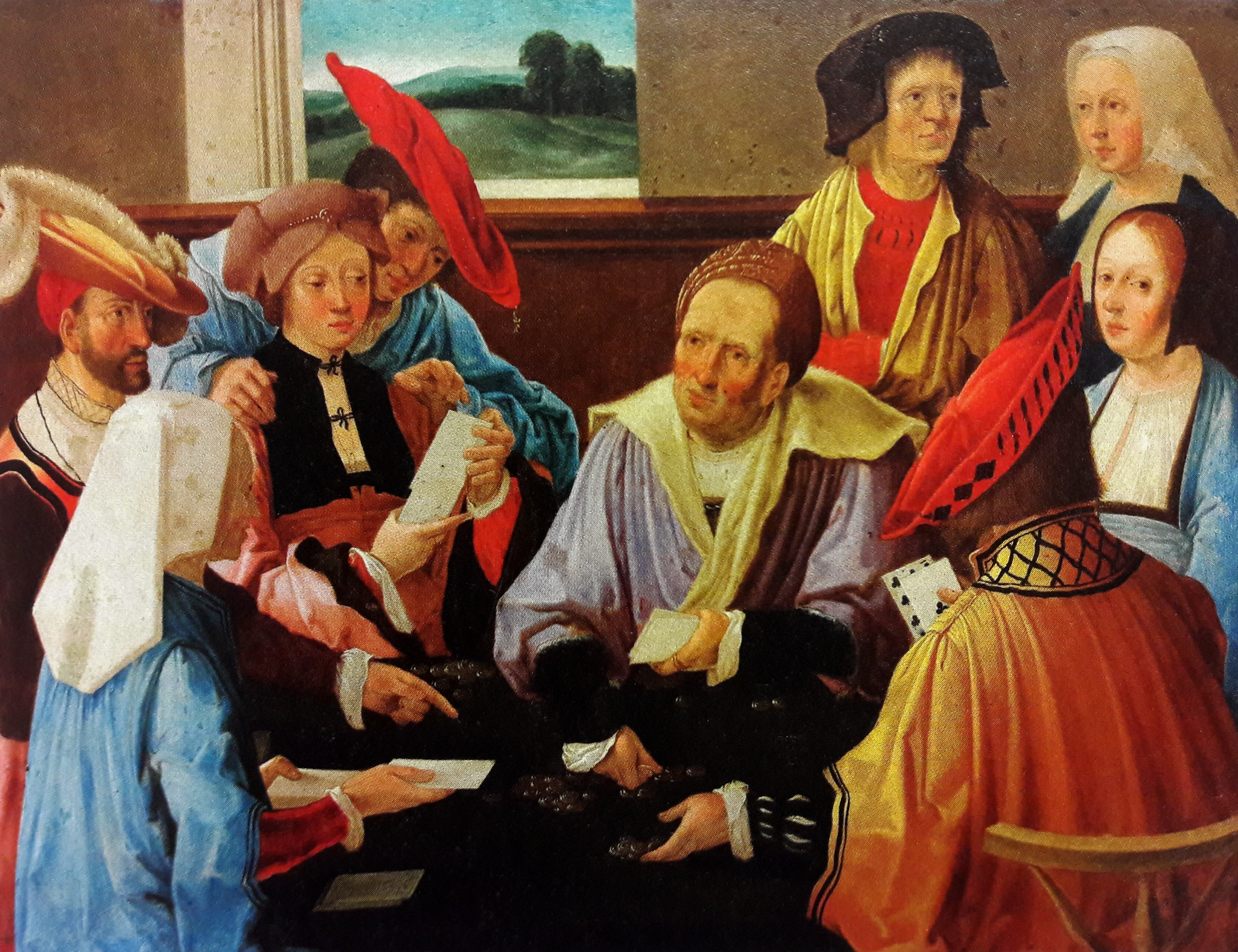
- The Card Players, by Lucas van Leyden, suggests that the game depicted is actually the game of Primero or one of its many variants.
- Origin: Italy
- Alternative names: Primavista
- Family: Matching
- Players: 2-6
- Skills: Tactics & Strategy
- Cards: 40
- Deck: Spanish
- Play: Clockwise
- Playing time: 20 min.
- Chance: Medium

Related games
- Primero, Poker

Primo visto, Primavista, Prima-vista, Primi-vist, Primiuiste, Primofistula, or even Primefisto, is a 16th-century gambling card game fashionable c. 1530–1640. Very little is known about this game, but judging by the etymology of the words used to describe the many local variants of the game, it appears to be one of Italian origin.

== Historical claims ==
Based upon references in period literature it appears to be closely related to the game of Primero, with some later authorities claiming that the two games were in fact the very same. Opposing claims to this theory include the fact that the earliest known reference to the name Primo visto appears in Greene's "Notable Discovery of Coosnage" published in 1591, more than half a century after the name Primero was in common use. John Minsheu, an English linguist and lexicographer, claims that Primero and Prima vista (hence Primo visto) were two distinct card games - "That is, first and first seen, because he that can shew such an order of cardes first winnes the game", although he gives but one set of names and just one reason for their names Robert Nares in his book "A Glossary" states that the circumstance of the cards being counted in the same way, with the "Six" reckoned for eighteen and the "Seven" for twenty-one, seems to determine that Primo visto was the same as Primero, or even possibly a later variation of the latter.

Slightly stronger evidence exists in the form of a list of popular board and card games and diversions of the time of the English Renaissance in John Taylor's 1621 book "Taylor's Motto", listing both Primero and Primefisto, and the same occurs in a list of card games in Richard Brome's "The New Academy".

== Variants ==
A brief poem by the French Humanist Mellin de Saint-Gelais written in 1525 describes Francis I of France, Pope Clement VII and Emperor Charles V (the combatants in the Italian War of 1521–1526, a struggle for the possession of Italy) playing a hand of "Prime" (a game similar to Primero and to the "Flux"). That seems to indicate that the game of Primo visto, and consequently Primero, is probably older than many historians have been able to determine and may date to the beginning of the 16th century or even further back in time.

A comparison with the terms used in the game of Primero, the mode of playing and the outcome, indicates that Primo visto was played according to the rules of Primero. It is possible, however, that it was played with only three cards dealt to each player instead of four, followed by a few rounds of bettings. Another possible difference may lie in the amount staked to the pool. The main part of the game was one of bluff and vies among the players, which also suggests that Primo visto was a simple variant, like the French game of "Prime".

== See also ==
- Gilet
- Primero
- Three card brag
- Bouillotte
- Post and Pair
- Put (card game)
- Ambigu
