= Gé, Point, Flux et Sequence =

Card game, recorded as early as 1654

Gé, Point Flux et Sequence
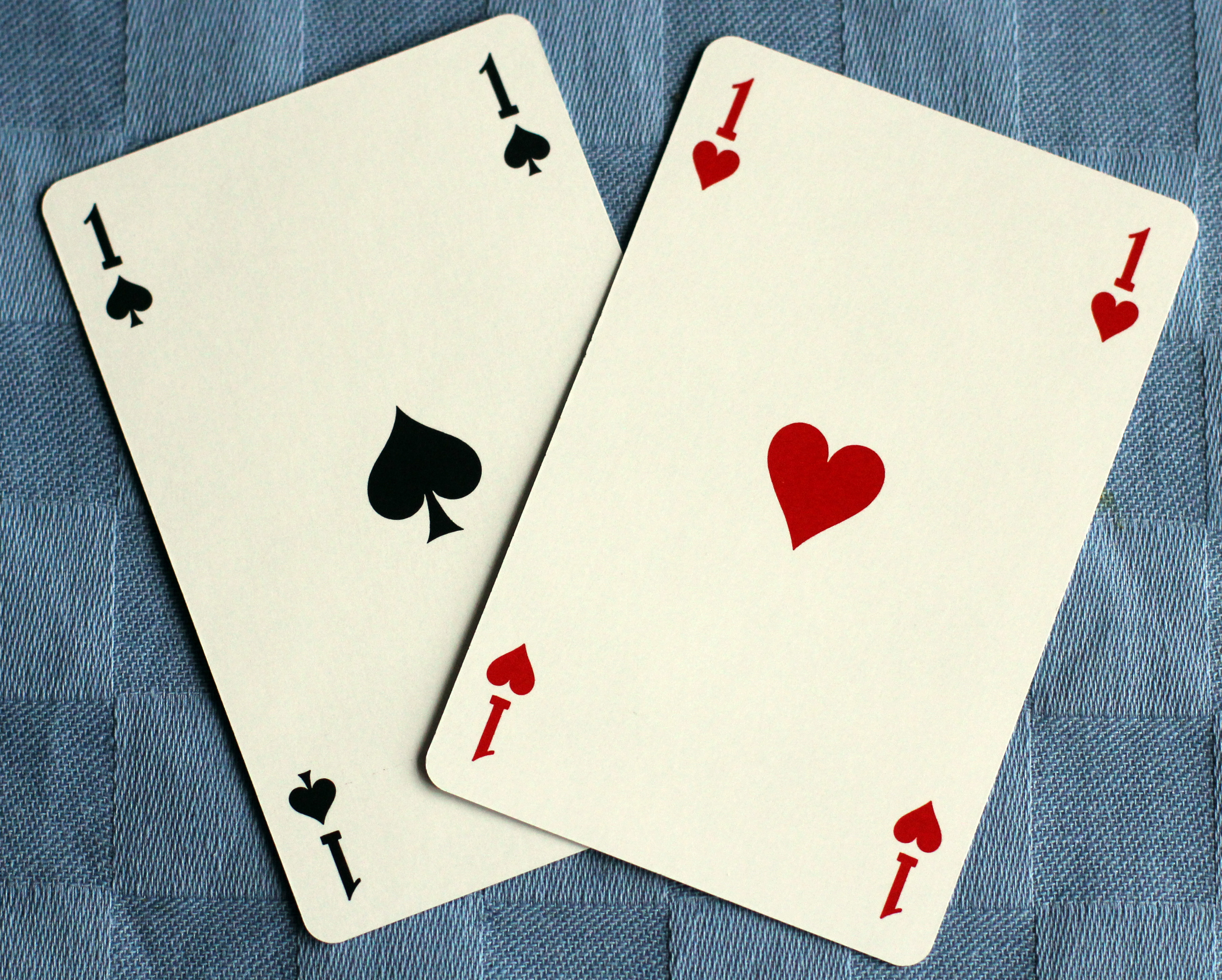
- The best combination - two Aces.
- Origin: France
- Release date: 1654
- Type: Vying
- Players: unspecified
- Skills: combinations, chance
- Cards: 32 or 52
- Deck: French-suited pack
- Rank (high→low): A K Q J 10 – 7 or 2

Related games
- Belle, Flux et Trente-et-Un, Gilet, Poch

Gé, Point, Flux et Sequence, also called Les Quatre Jeux is an historical, French gambling, card game of the 17th and early 18th centuries.

== History ==
The rules of the game were first recorded in 1654 by de la Marinière and were reprinted several times until 1702. It appears to have been superseded by Gilet, the rules for which first appeared, as Gillet, in 1718. In Gillet, there were only 2 pots initially, one for Gé, which went to the player with the highest tricon (triplet) or, if none had three of a kind, with the highest pair. The second pot was for Point and Flux combined.

== Rules ==
The following rules are based on de la Marinière's description of Gé, Point, Flux et Sequence and related games.

Like Poch and Belle, Flux et Trente-et-Un is a compound game of 4 parts, hence the name Les Quatres Jeux ("The Four Games"). The game is played with a pack of 52 French-suited playing cards; in addition four coin dishes or pots are needed for the stakes. Before the start of the game, each player antes an agreed stake into each pot. Each player is then dealt three cards, face down.

=== Gé ===
The player with the highest pair wins and sweeps the first pot. Two Aces are worth 20½ and beat two Kings, etc. (Note: No mention is made of triplets, presumably there is no advantage to having three of a kind.)

=== Point ===
The player with the highest two cards of the same suit, called Point, wins and sweeps the second pot. Cards score as follows: Aces, court cards and Tens - 10 points, pip cards - face value. Except that two Aces score 20½ points, thus outranking other ten-point combinations. (Note: According to Parlett (1991) this is strictly Flush-Point (Flux-Point); Point being merely two cards of any suit.)

=== Flux ===
Similarly, the player with the best flush or Flux, being three cards of the same suit, wins the third pot.

=== Sequence ===
The player with the best sequence, i.e. a run of three cards in order such as an Ace, Deuce & Trey or Knave, Queen, & King, sweeps the fourth pot. A suit sequence, known as Flutée, beats all the others.

If, as rarely happens, no-one wins the Gé, Point, Flux or Sequence, the money in the pots doubles for as many times as the cards are played without anyone winning that combination. According to de la Marinière "I have sometimes seen this Flux & Sequence rise to very large sums."

== Literature ==
- D.L.M. (1654). La maison des jeux académique. 1st edn. Robert de Nain and Marin Leché, Paris.
- de la Marinière, E. (1659). La maison académique. 2nd edn. Estienne Loison, Paris.
- Sorel, Charles (1665). La maison des jeux académique. 3rd edn. Estienne Loyson, Paris.
- Sorel, Charles (1668). La maison des jeux académique. Estienne Loyson, Paris. Same as 1665 edn.
- de la Marinière (1674). La maison académique. Langlois & Liberal, Lyon.
- de la Marinière (1697). La maison académique. Goy, Lyon.
- de la Marinière (1702). La maison académique. Elinckhuysen, La Haye.
- * Parlett, David (1991). A History of Card Games, OUP, Oxford. pp. 89/90. ISBN 0-19-282905-X
