= Stop the bus =

English card game

A prial of three aces, the highest-ranked hand in stop the bus

Stop the bus is a simple game, common in England where it is also known as Bastard.

The game uses the hand rankings from Brag. Three of a kind (a prial) is the best hand followed by a running flush, then a run, then a flush, then a pair followed by a high card. If a hand is otherwise similar then the card is ranked by high card or high pair, then by middle card or kicker, then low card. No suits are higher valued than any other.

The game is played with a standard 52 card deck. Each player starts with some number of tokens, generally 3, and the last person to lose their token wins. Each round everybody is dealt 3 cards face down, with 3 dealt into the middle face up. Starting with the player on the dealer's left and working clockwise each player must take either 1 or 3 of the centre cards and replace it with an equal number from their own hand. After playing, a player may elect to "stop the bus", in which case everybody else gets one turn only. After somebody has "stopped the bus" and everybody else has had a turn, the hands are revealed. The player or players with the weakest hand must relinquish one token, and play continues with the new dealer being the player immediately clockwise of the old dealer. Once a player has lost all of their tokens they are out. The winner is the last player to retain a token.
