= Belle, Flux et Trente-et-Un =

French-German gambling card game

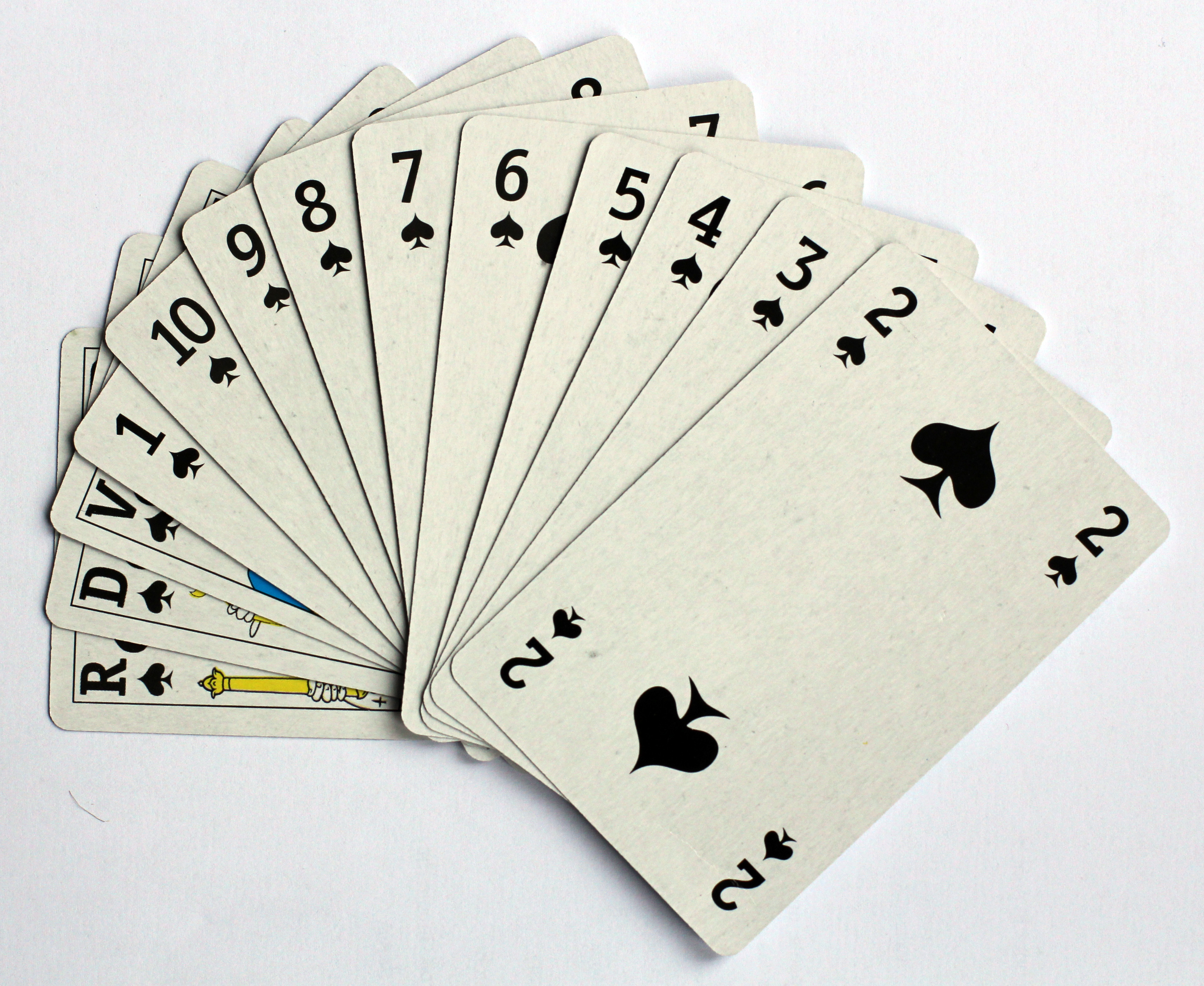
The suit of spades from a 52-card French pack (Écarté ranking)

Belle, Flux et Trente-et-Un, is an historical, gambling card game that was widespread in France and Germany during the 17th and 18th centuries. As a relative of Brag and Poch, from which the game of Poker developed, it is of cultural-historical interest.

The game is also called Les Trois Jeux ("The Three Games") or, in German, Dreisatz ("Triple Stake") or Belle, Fluss und Einunddreißig ("Belle, Flush (Note: Fluss is German for "river", but in card games it meant holding either all the cards of one suit, as in Piquet, or simply holding cards all of the same suit. It is clearly a German rendering of Flux, meaning "Flush". See e.g. Ludovici (1735), p. 1391.) and Thirty One"). Meanwhile Parlett records it as Best, Flush and Thirty-One.

== Rules ==
The following rules are taken from Lacombe (1800):

=== Overview ===
The game is played by two to twelve players with a pack of 52 French playing cards; in addition three coin dishes are needed for the three stakes. Before the start of the game, players agree how many deals or how long they will play for. Then each player puts an agreed amount of money into each of the three baskets (paniers).

Like Poch, Belle, Flux et Trente-et-Un is a compound game of 3 parts, hence the names Dreisatz ("Triple Stake") and Les Trois Jeux ("The Three Games").

=== Belle ===
Once the stakes have been placed, each player is dealt 2 cards, face down, and 1 card, face up. The player who has the highest upcard, the so-called Belle, wins the first deal and the contents of the first basket.

The ranking of the cards is as in Écarté with the Ace between the Jack and Ten:

King – Queen – Jack – Ace – Ten – Nine – ... – Two

If two or more tie with the highest cards, there is no winner and the stakes remain in the basket for the next deal. (Note: Some rules state that, in the event of a tie in any of the three phases, forehand, the player who is next to deal, wins.)

=== Flux ===
In the second deal, Flux, (Note: Flux, also Fluxus, cf. flush.) the winner is the player who has the highest-value flush. A flush is a hand of three cards of the same suit. In this phase, the Ace is the highest card.

If two or more players have a flush, the card points are added and the highest-value flush wins. For this, the Aces counts as 11 points, the court cards 10 each, and the pip cards score from 2 to 9 depending on their natural value. If there is a tie, or if no player has a flush, the stakes remain in the basket for the next game.

Unlike the game of Poch, there is no betting on the highest combination, as subsequently became typical for Poker. There is also no option to bluff.

=== Trente-et-Un ===
Finally, in the third deal each player attempts, by exchanging cards if necessary, to score 31 points, or to get as close to 31 points as possible (cf. Vingt-et-Un, and the third round of Brag). The player who comes closest to 31 wins the contents of the third basket. If there is a tie, the stake is carried forward to the next deal.

The modern casino game of Black Jack was developed from this contract via Trente-et-Un and Vingt-et-Un.

== Literature ==
- Meyers Konversationslexikon of 1888
- Brockhaus Konversationslexikon 1894/96
- Friedrich Anton: Encyklopädie der Spiele, Leipzig, 1889
- Jacques Lacombe: Encyclopédie méthodiques. Dictionnaire des jeux, p. 7 Online, p. 7, at Google Books, 1800
- Parlett, David (1990). The Oxford Guide to Card Games, Oxford University Press, Oxford/New York
- Ludovici, Carl Günther (1735). Grosses vollständiges Universal-Lexicon aller Wissenschafften und Künste. Vol. 9 (F). Halle and Leipzig: Johann Heinrich Sedler.
- Parlett, David (2008). The Penguin Book of Card Games. London: Penguin.
