= Post and pair =

Card game

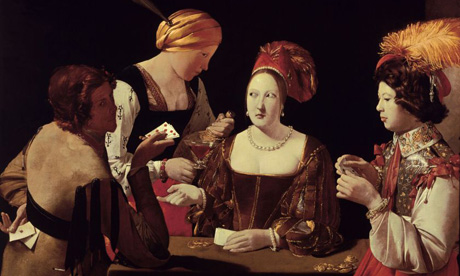
- Origin: England
- Alternative names: Post-and-Pair, Post
- Players: 2-6
- Skills: Bluffing, vying
- Cards: 52
- Deck: English
- Play: Clockwise
- Playing time: 10 min.
- Chance: Medium

Related games
- Primero

Post and Pair or Post and Pare is a gambling card game that was popular in England in the 16th and 17th centuries — another name of the game was Pink. It is based on the same three-card combinations, namely prial, found in related games of this family.

It is much dependent on vying, or betting, requiring repeated staking as well as daring on the part of the players. It is considered a derivative of the game of Primero and closely resembles another game, called Put, that was as popular as Gleek and Noddy during the Tudor dynasty.

== History ==
Post and pair appears to derive from the game of Primero. Due to its gaming mechanics and resemblance with Primero and its variants, it is easily implied that post and pair evolved into a faster-paced card game with the addition of rules borrowed from neighboring games, like the Tudor game named post, attested by The Oxford English Dictionary from the early 16th to the 17th centuries, which may have survived longer in local versions.

Charles Cotton, in his 1674 The Compleat Gamester, mentions that Post and Pair was particularly popular in the west of England, as much as All Fours was popular in Kent, and Fives in Ireland. And if Francis Willughby's 1816 Book of Games gives no rules for the game, Cotton describes it as a three-stake game - stakes being laid for Post, Pair and Seat - almost identical to Three-Card Brag (or Three-Stake Brag). David Parlett and John McLeod suggest that modern Brag is an extract of Post and Pair.

== Play ==
Three separate stakes are made by each player. After staking at "post" and then at "pair", and getting two cards, the players stake at "seat". A third card is then dealt face up. The three stakes are won as follows:

- Seat. The stake goes to the holder of the best single Whist card dealt face up. The A♦ is the highest card, followed by the other Aces and then the rest in their natural order.
- Pair. The stake goes to the player with the best set i.e. cards of the same rank, or to the player who can outvie the others into ceding the stake. A pair royal of aces is the best hand, followed by a pair royal of any three court cards in order of rank: three kings, three queens, three knaves (jacks), etc. If no one has a pair royal, the highest pair wins, failing that, the hand that holds the highest cards wins. If players are still tied, the eldest hand wins.
- Post. The stake goes to the player with the best combination of cards totalling, or most approaching, twenty-one points. The best possible combination is two tens and an ace, with court cards counting as ten. (Note: The rules by Cotton and their subsequent revisions do not mention the typical Twenty-One rule that players whose cards fall short of 21 may ask for one or more cards in the hope of improving their hands, dropping out if their score exceeds 21.)

Players may vie for Pair. Eldest hand begins and may vie or pass. Having passed, eldest may come in again, if any others vie. If a player vies, the others must respond in turn by 'raising' the bet or 'seeing' i.e. matching it. In the latter case, the players left in may agree to divide the stakes; otherwise they must show their cards and the best hand wins. If no-one vies, the dealer may double the stakes or just "play it out" i.e. let everyone show their hands and the best hand wins.

== Notes ==
As Charles Cotton said in The Compleat Gamester (1674):

The vye is what you please to adventure upon the goodness of your own hand; or if it be bad, and you imagine your adversary's is so likewise, then bid him high courageously, by which means you daunt your antagonist, and so bring him to submission. If all the gamesters keep in till all have done, and by consent shew their cards, the best cards carry the game. Now according to agreement those that keep in till last, may divide the stakes, or shew the best card for it. Observe, where the cards fall in several hands of the same sort, as a pair of pair-royal, and so forth, the eldest hand carries it.

== Post and Pair in literature ==
Post and Pair was first mentioned in a list of games played by Gargantua of Gargantua and Pantagruel, a 1532 novel by François Rabelais.

Shakespeare mentions the vye ("taunt") of the game, named as "pair", in a dialogue between the character Rosaline and the Princess of France in a conversation about the courtier Berowne, in his early play Love's Labour's Lost, written in the mid-1590s.

They are worse fools to purchase mocking so.
That same Berowne I'll torture ere I go.
...
So pair-taunt-like would I o'ersway his state,
That he should be my fool, and I his fate.

In Ben Jonson's Masque of Christmas, the card game of post and pair is introduced as one of his children, thus characterizing him as a knave. According to the A Dictionary of Archaic and Provincial Words, Obsolete Phrases and Ancient Customs of the Fourteenth Century, by James Orchard Halliwell-Phillipps, written in 1868, pur was the term given to the knave or jack in the game of post and pair. It may have been formed by an abbreviation of pair-royal corrupted into purrial, similar to how pair-royal has since been otherwise corrupted into prial. However, the trump Jack in some continental games like Swiss Jass is called Puur or Pur.

The game is mentioned in Canto Six of Walter Scott's epic poem Marmion as a "vulgar" game played at Christmas. Post and pair is also prominently mentioned in A Woman Killed with Kindness by Thomas Heywood and in the anonymous Swetnam the Woman-Hater in which several characters play the game onstage.

== See also ==
- Gilet (card game)
- Primo visto

== Literature ==
- "Cavendish (1879). Card Essays, Clay's Decisions and Card-Table Talk. London: Thos. De La Rue. NY: Scribner & Welford.
- Cotton, Charles (1674). The Compleat Gamester; Or, Instructions how to Play at Billiards, Trucks, Bowls and Chess ... Cards ... Dice, To which is Added the Arts ... of Riding, Racing, Archery, and Cockfighting [by Charles Cotton]. Henry Brome.Often republished with Lucas, Theophilus (1714). Lives of the Gamesters– e.g. in Games and Gamesters of the Restoration. Ramage Press. 2000. ISBN 978-1446501764.)
- Dallas, Eneas Sweetland (1863). "Once a Week". X. London: Bradbury & Evans: 364.
- Miers, David. Regulating Commercial Gambling: Past, Present, and Future. Oxford University Press. Gaming in the Seventeenth and Eighteenth Centuries. doi:10.1093/acprof:oso/9780199276158.003.0002. ISBN 9780199276158.
- Nares, Robert (1822). A Glossary: Or Collection of Words, Phrases, Names &c. London: Robert Triphook.
- Rabelais, François (1532). Gargantua and Pantagruel.
- Shakespeare, William (1998). Woudhuysen, H.R. (ed.). Love's Labour's Lost. Bloomsbury Arden Shakespeare. ISBN 978-1-904271-10-9.

Attribution
