= Primero =

Gambling card game

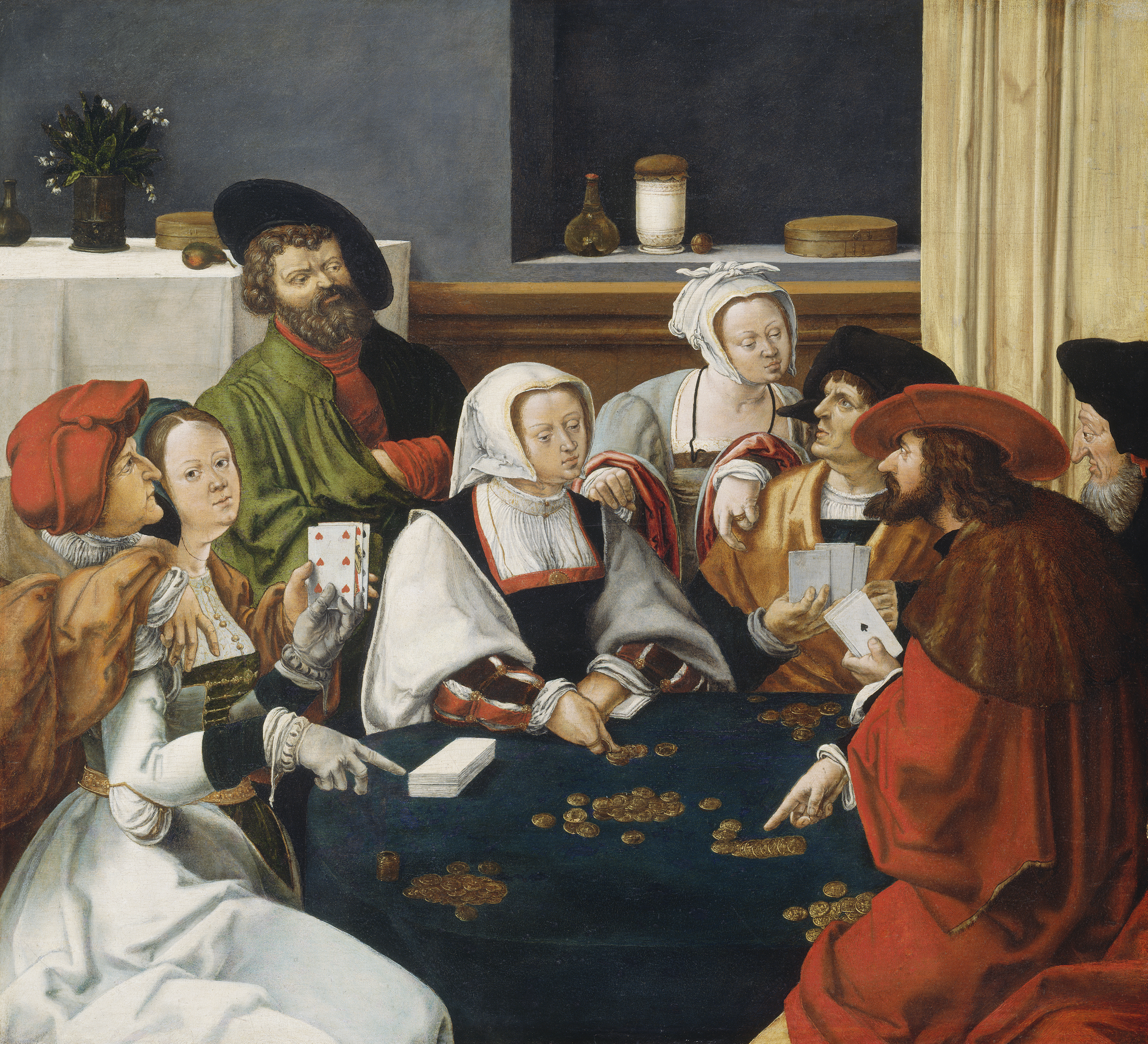
- The Card Players (1508–1510) by Lucas van Leyden
- Origin: Italy
- Alternative names: Primiero
- Family: Matching
- Players: 2-6
- Skills: Tactics & Strategy
- Cards: 40
- Deck: Italian or Spanish
- Play: Counter-Clockwise
- Playing time: 20 min.
- Chance: Medium

Related games
- Primo visto • Poker

Primero (in English also called Primus, in French Prime, in Italian Primiera or in Spanish Primera), is a 16th-century gambling card game of which the earliest reference dates back to 1526. Primero is closely related to the game of primo visto (a.k.a. prima-vista, and various other spellings), if not the same. It is also believed to be one of the ancestors to the modern game of poker, to which it is strikingly similar.

The gambling game with this name goes back to the 16th century, being known to Gerolamo Cardano as primiera, which he thought of as the noblest of all card games, to François Rabelais as prime, and to William Shakespeare as primero.

== The origins of Primero ==
It is uncertain if Primero is of Spanish or Italian origin. Although Daines Barrington is of the opinion that it is of Spanish origin, a poem of Francesco Berni is the earliest known writing to mention the game; it affords proof that it was at least commonly played in Italy at the beginning of the 16th century. His work entitled Capitolo del Gioco della Primiera, published in Rome in 1526, and believed to be the earliest extant work describing a card game, contains some particulars on primero. According to David Parlett, the game's card-point system is found in other Italian games but nowhere else. The game is still very much played in central Europe and Spain with Italian-suited cards, under the name of goffo or bambara, remaining the major native vying game of Italy. Alessandro Striggio's madrigal dramatizing a party of the game "II gioco di primiera" was published in 1569.

== Etymology ==
This old game of cards was called prime in France, primera in Spain, and primiera in Italy. All names derived from the Latin primarius, 'first'. In English literature, besides the occasional use of the foreign names, the game is designated primero (and also prima-vista, a probable variant), with the usual corruptions in spelling of the early days.

According to Stephen Skinner, primero and prima-vista are one and the same game. As for John Minshew, primero and prima-vista (Primum et primum visum, that is, first and first seen, because he that can show such an order of cards, wins the game), are two different games of cards.

Whichever opinion these two seventeenth-century lexicographers might have had on the origin of primero, it seems fairly plausible that the game being played in different parts of Europe had to acquire similar names as it migrated from one country to another, or from one region to the other, notably in Italy and Spain. And with the addition of new rules to the original set of rules, or even variations on the rules that the game devised, it finally reached a level of development that made them become separate games, despite their common origin. So, as the Italian writer Berni said: "The game is played differently in different places."

== The gamblers ==
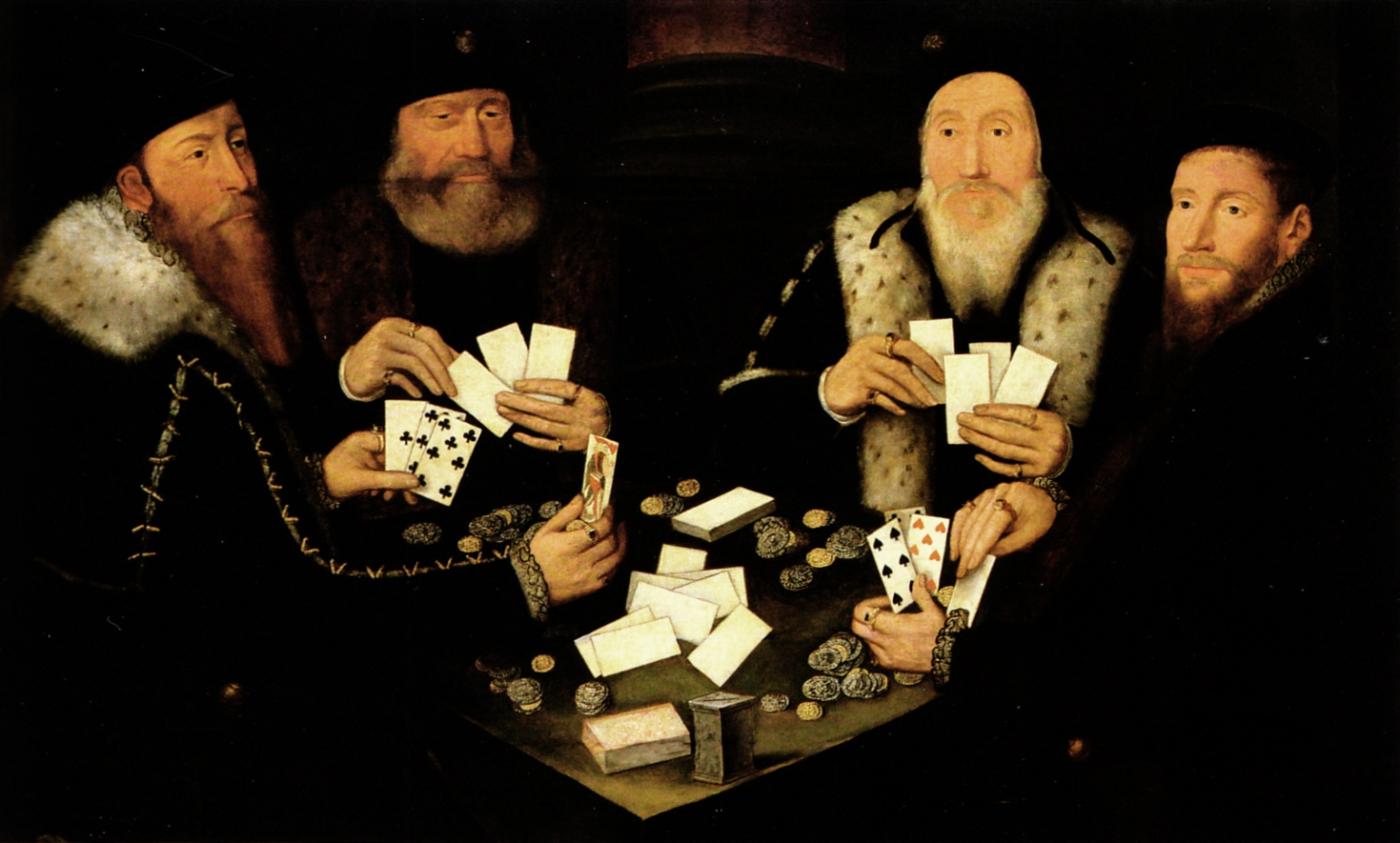
Four Gentlemen of High Rank Playing Primero, now attributed to the Master of the Countess of Warwick or his circle.

Daines Barrington described an Elizabethan card party painted by Federico Zuccari that originally belonged to Lord Falkland in which Lord Burleigh is represented playing at cards with three other persons, apparently of distinction, each having two rings on the same fingers of both their hands. The cards used are marked as at present, although they differ from those of modern times for being narrower and longer. Eight of the cards lie on the table with the blank side uppermost, for the cards at that time had blank backs, while four remain in each of the other players hands. A particular in this painting is that one of the players is seen showing his cards, which are: the jack (knave) of hearts, the ace, 7 and 6 of clubs. The cover of the pack lying on the table displays two lions supporting a shield, upon which is what appears to be a heraldic rose (the crest of the Tudors), and underneath, though indistinctly, the partially illegible name of a French card-maker Jehan Licl**rer. This particular shows that the cards then used were at least sometimes obtained from France. The money on the table, together with considerable heaps of gold and silver, appears to be coins of Edward VI and Queen Elizabeth I.

As the first Marquess of Exeter, Lord Burleigh, is said to have entirely devoted his time to business and study, taking no diversion but that afforded by his gardens, of which he was both fond and proud, it is to be supposed that this painting was not actually a portrait of him, though mistaken for his, as was the ownership of the old manor-house of Wimbledon. So, there seems to be little doubt here as for which game the artist meant to describe, and that the person exhibiting his cards to the spectators had won a lush, for his three clubs are the best cards for counting.

A passage in an old play by Robert Greene has been quoted by several writers as evidence that primero was a gambling game. But a person who objects to cards, might make such a remark with respect to any card game, whether a gambling game or not. Judging from the partial descriptions of the game which remain to us, it might seem that primero was played for either large or small stakes, as agreed upon. John Florio describes primero played by two persons for "one shilling stake and three rest (pool)." In Minsheu's "Spanish Dialogues", four play; the stake is two shillings and the rest, eight. The text is self-explanatory, explaining also the meaning of the name primero.

== Primero and the Tudor dynasty ==
Primero appears to have been one of the earliest card games played in England during the Renaissance and the Tudor dynasty, and certainly it continued to be one of the most fashionable games throughout the reigns of Henry VIII, Edward VI, Mary I of England, Elizabeth I and James I, due to the frequent mention of it by many writers of that time. Already during the reign of Henry VII, notices of money issued several times for the King's losses at cards appear in the Remembrance's Office, dated December the 26th, in the ninth year of his reign. There, an entry is made of one hundred shillings paid at one time to him for the purpose of playing at cards. The private expenses of Princess Mary, Henry VIII's daughter and later Queen, also contain numerous items of money "for the playe at cardes". But despite the records, it is not certain that primero found its way to England previously to the marriage of Queen Mary I with Philip II of Spain, although there is no doubt that his coming to England from the court of Charles V would have cause it to be more generally known and played. William Shakespeare also speaks of Henry VIII playing at primero with his brother-in-law Charles Brandon, 1st Duke of Suffolk, and makes Falstaff say: "I never prospered since I forswore myself at primero." Additionally, the clown Lancelot in Shakespeare's The Merchant of Venice confides in this father that "for mine own part, as I have set up my rest to run away, so I will not rest till I have sun some ground" (2.2.91-92). To "set up [one's] rest" alludes to a type of gamble in the Italian version of primero. Among the epigrams of John Harington we have one which describes "The Story of Marcus' Life at Primero", in which many of the terms of the game are developed in detail.

== Evolution and decline ==
Judging by the pattern of succession of games during the Renaissance, many of the card games played throughout Europe, ascended in popularity to be later replaced by another type of game, again brought into England by the court gamester of that time. So that, by the last quarter of the 16th century, primero had already decreased in popularity, and was gradually replaced by the trick-taking game maw, the favorite card game of James I, and alluded by Harington as supplanting primero. According to Charles Cotton, primero, which by the time of the Restoration in 1660 had already evolved into many other variations, some of six cards, rapidly went out of fashion with the introduction of the Spanish game of Ombre.

== Rules of the game ==
The object of the game, as in poker, is to attain the highest possible hand, or at least bluff your competitors out of betting against you. There are no existing written rules for the 16th-century primero, only descriptions. However, a number of reconstructions of the game have been made, primarily on the basis of books describing playing strategy and references in period literature.

=== The play ===
Primero is played with a 40-card deck, and there are special decks made for this game. It works best with four to six players. The player who holds the prime, a sequence of the best cards and a good trump, is sure to be successful over the adversaries – hence the game's name.

Primero hands from high to low
Chorus (quartet)	Four cards of a kind
Fluxus (flush)	All cards of the same suit
Supremus (fifty-five)	The highest possible three-flush: the ace, 6, 7 (plus an unrelated fourth card) and ace card from any other suit
Primero (prime)	One card from each suit. It's a four-card hand containing one card of each suit, hence the exact opposite of a flush in poker.
Numerus (point)	Two or three cards of the same suit. A point of higher card-value beats one of lower value for which purpose Courts count 10 each of the hand is the sum of the cards. ace, 6, 7 and jack cards in any suit.

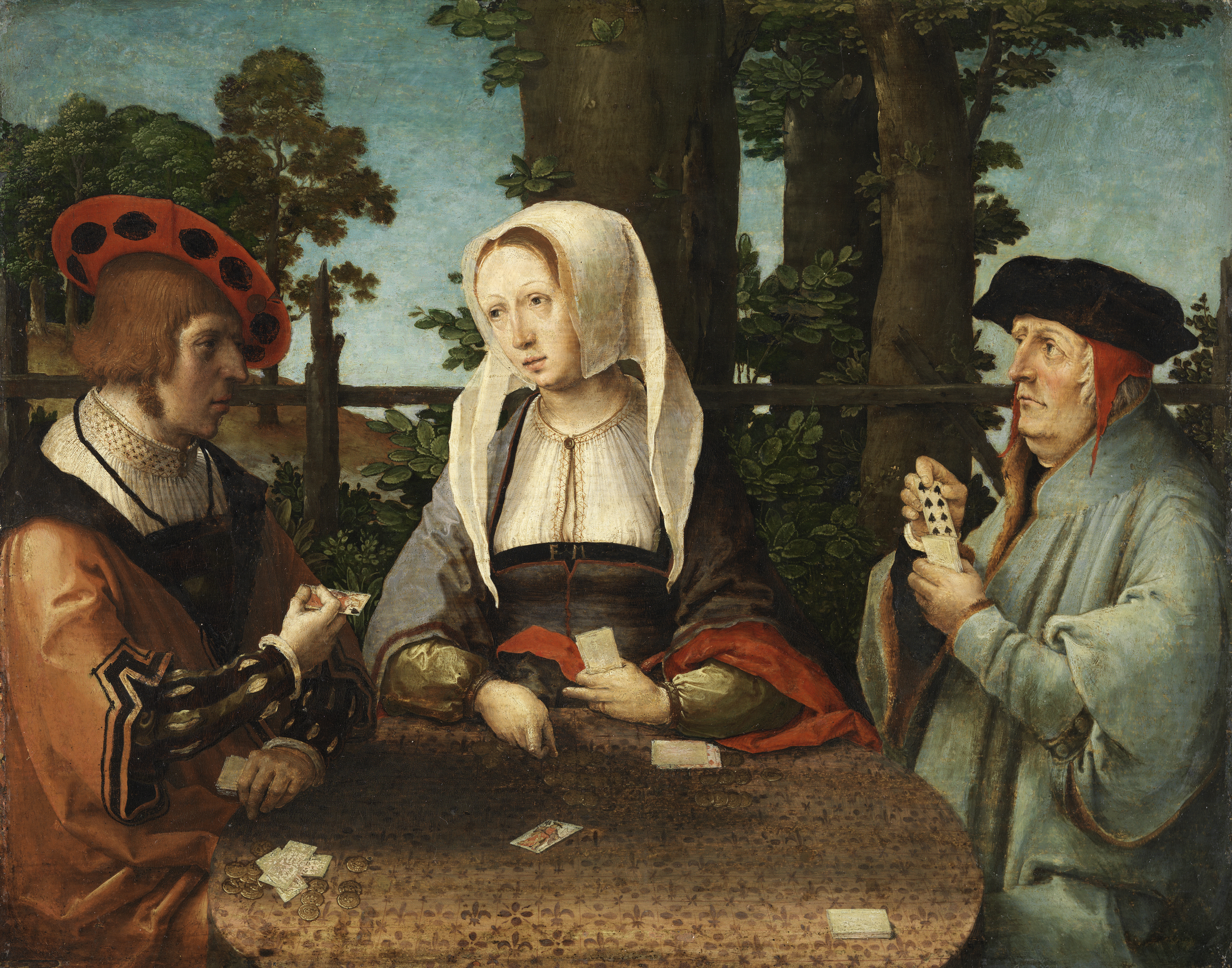
Card Players by Lucas van Leyden. It is assumed that the subject of this painting may not be the obvious three card players, but in fact it may refer to a secret political alliance between Spain and England against Francis I of France. The figure on the left would be Charles V and on the right Cardinal Wolsey, both entering into a secret agreement. The woman in the centre would be Margaret of Austria, sister of Charles V and regent of the Netherlands.

Card point values
Type of card	Value
Any Face (court) card	10 points
2 (deuce)	12 points
3 (trey)	13 points
4	14 points
5	15 points
Ace	16 points
6	18 points
7	21 points

=== English version ===
Because this is a gambling game, the first step is for all players to ante into the pot. The deal is counter-clockwise, starting with the dealer. Each player receives 4 cards dealt in 2's from a 40-card deck ranking K Q J 7 6 5 4 3 2 A. Anyone dealt a winning combination calls for an immediate showdown, and the player with the best hand wins the pot. Two cards go to each player, which is followed by the next phase of betting, and two more cards are dealt to each player. Then either eight cards are dealt face down on the table or the remaining cards are left out as a draw pile or stockpile.

In the eight-card version, eight cards are laid out on the table, and players may draw and discard from only these. When a player is satisfied with his cards, he may knock on the table, calling out: Vada (go!), which brings an immediate showdown won by the best hand. If no one bets, the stakes are carried forward to the next deal; but if one stays in, at least one other must contest the pot, this obligation ultimately falling upon the player immediately ahead of the last bettor if everyone else has folded. In a showdown, the better equal combinations are those with the highest point. Thus, a quartet of aces (4x16=64) beats a quartet of 5s (60), but it's beaten by four 6s (72). Four kings will not beat four queens or jacks, as these hands all count 40. Such ties are broken in favor of the eldest hand competing.

Players vie or vye by stating how high a hand they claim to have, and may bluff by overstating it. What they apparently must not do is to underbid their hands; for as Cardano puts it: "If anyone wins with the greatest point, he is obliged to show another card; otherwise he loses his deposit because he could have a 'Flush'... Similarly, if he 'vies' on the basis of point, he is obliged to show two different cards and one of a matching suit, so that no one may suspect him of having a 'Flush' or 'Prime'."

A player may either knock or draw in a turn, but not both. Once a player knocks, he may no longer draw. When two players have knocked, the play stops, and cards are shown. Betting starts after the two cards are dealt, and may continue after these two cards have been dealt, and then at every round, just before the dealer's turn. The dealer always bets first. Players may match, raise, or fold any time during wagering. If all players refuse a bet, it must be withdrawn.

=== Italian version ===
In Rome, the full 52-card deck was used. In Florence, it is custom to leave out the 7s, 8s and 9s, keeping and vying only with the smaller cards; the "rest" (to set up a rest means 'to win [something]', and is a phrase which occurs in almost every poem in the times of James and Charles. It is taken from terms used at primero, and perhaps other games then played) is made at the second card, and when the first player say "pass", every one is obliged to discard, notwithstanding any one may have an ace or a 6 in hand. In Venice, for instance, the mode of playing may be different; in Lombardy, Naples, France and Spain, so many countries, so many customs. But of all the modes, none can be superior to that of the court of Rome. There, the 7s, 8s and 9s are not withdrawn; there it is allowed to discard, but not both cards after "pass" is once said; nor can this be done with the two cards of the rest, as it is usual in other places. The most essential operation of this game may be its two principal hands, the flush and the primera, and a third, derived from the first, which is called punto; from these three are deducted all the varieties which daily occur at primero, as the greater and lesser flush, the great and little prime, and more or less points; this diversity gives rise to numerous controversies and disputable points. Another excellent hand in this game is four-of-a-kind; four court cards, four aces, etc., beat both the flush and primera.

=== Spanish version ===
Jacob Le Duchat, in a note on that chapter of Rabelais, in which the games Gargantua played at are enumerated, has described the mode of playing primero, and a similar account may be gathered from the Dictionary of the Spanish Academy. According to Duchat, there are two kinds of primero, the greater and the lesser; the difference between them is that the former is played with the figured cards, while at the latter the highest card is the 7, which counts for 21. Each player has four cards, which are dealt one by one. the next card in value to the 7 is the 6, which counts for 18; then the 6, which counts for 15. The ace is equivalent to 6 points, but the 2 (deuce), the 3 (trey) and the 4 count only for their respective numbers. To these cards may be added, if the players choose, the quinola, for which the jack of hearts is most commonly chosen, and of which he may make what card and what colour he likes. After which each of the players show their four cards, and he whose cards are all of different sorts wins the prime, if they are all of one colour he wins the Flush. Meanwhile, according to the Great Spanish Dictionary, is played by dealing four cards to each player; the value of the 7, 6 and ace, are the same; but the 2 is said to count for 12, the 3 for 13, the 4 for 14, and the 5 for 15, the figured cards are each equivalent to 10. The best hand is the flush, that is, four cards of high numbers and one of one colour; the next is the punto(supremus), consisting of the quinola, 7, 6, and ace, which count for 55; then the primera, or prime, which is four cards of different suits. Should two persons have flushes, the player who counts the highest number, or the greatest flush wins, and the same regulation holds good in regard to the prime. But should there be neither flush nor prime, the one who can count the most points in one suit wins.

== See also ==
- Ambigu
- Bouillotte
- Brelan
- Gilet
- Post and pair
- Put (card game)
- Three-card brag
