= Chor voli =

Chor Voli is an Afghan card game, which was described by Gyula Zsigri in 1992.

== Deal, discard and play ==
The game played by standard international pattern 52-card pack. The game played by four players. Before the deal each player takes one coin to the pool. Then they receive 13 cards each. From the 13 card each player must create 4 card groups, and discard one card. Then each player must show they groups by the order of these strength, one round is four turn. Who have the most valuable combination take one coin from the pool and win the turn. The next turn started by the winner of the last.

== Combinations ==
The valid three-card combinations in descending order of strength are in the following chart.

Value	Name	Combinations in value order	Note
1.	Chor voli (four of a kind)	A-A-A-A...2-2-2-2	A player who has chor voli wins the round.
2.	Three of a kind	A-A-A...2-2-2	In some variations the three 3 is the highest.
3.	Three-card straight flush (three consecutive cards of the same suit)	A-K-Q,3-2-A...4-3-2	
4.	Three-card straight (three consecutive cards of mixed suits)	A-K-Q,3-2-A...4-3-2	
5.	Three-card flush (Three cards of the same suit, not consecutive)	Value is determined by the highest card.	
6.	Three unrelated cards	Value is determined by the highest.	Can't include pairs, or two from the same suit.

If two players have the same valued combination, the that wins which takes the cards down later at the turn.
