= Brag (card game) =

British card game

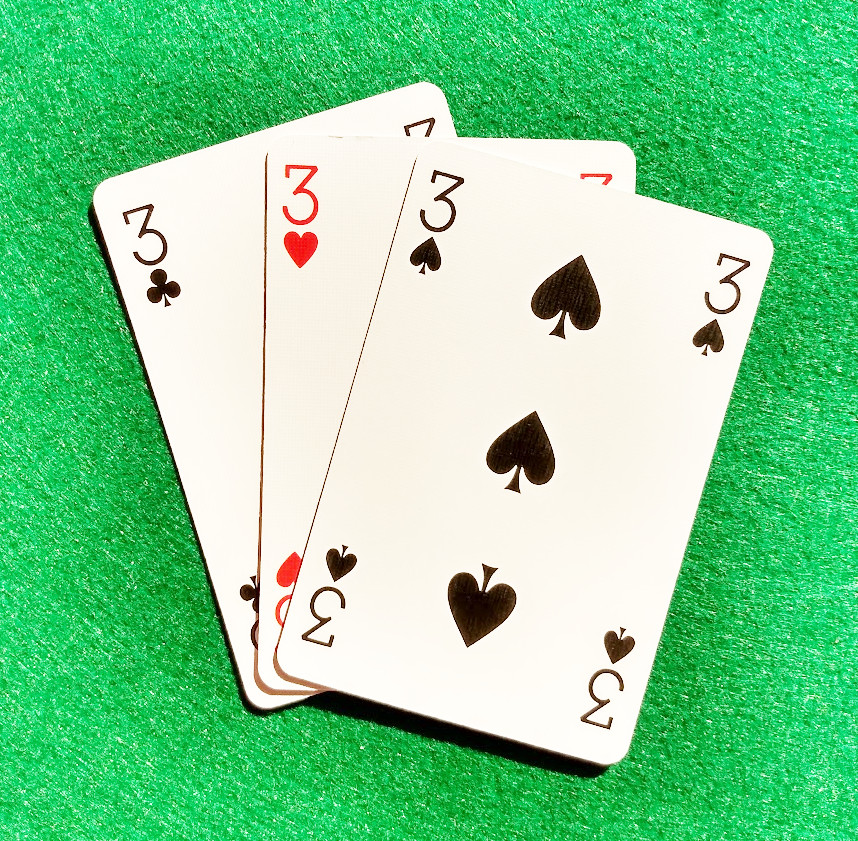
- The highest hand in Three-Card Brag: a prial of 3s
- Origin: English
- Alternative names: Brag
- Type: Gambling
- Players: 2 upwards
- Skills: Counting
- Cards: 52 cards
- Deck: Anglo-American
- Play: Clockwise
- Playing time: 5–10 min.
- Chance: Medium

Related games
- Stop the Bus

Brag is an 18th-century British card game, and the British national representative of the vying or "bluffing" family of gambling games. It is a descendant of the Elizabethan game of Primero and one of the several ancestors to poker, the modern version just varying in betting style and hand rankings. It has been described as the "longest-standing British representative of the Poker family."

== History ==
The rules of Brag first appear in 1721 in The Compleat Gamester where it is referred to as "The Ingenious and Pleasant Game of Bragg", but in fact, it originates in an almost identical game called Post and Pair which is recorded as far back as 1528 (as Post) and which, in turn, was descended from Primero. However, Brag introduced a key innovation over Post and Pair: the concept of wild cards known as 'braggers'. Initially there was just one, the Knave of Clubs; later the Nine of Diamonds was added. In parallel with this early three-stake game, in 1751 Hoyle describes a version of Brag with a shortened pack that only had a single phase – the vying or 'bragging' round – with special powers for certain Jacks and Nines, thus anticipating the modern single-stake game. In 1825, an early American account of Brag describes a much more elaborate single-stake game with a complex vying procedure. Not until 1860 are rules for both variants published in one compendium, whereby "Three Stake Brag" is virtually unchanged from the earliest rules and the version of "Single Brag" described is less complicated than its American cousin.

In a 1981 survey by Waddingtons, Brag was the fourth most popular card game in Britain. In 1992, Parlett stated that the classic three-stake variant (see Classic Brag below) was defunct; nevertheless, its rules were still being published in 2001.

== Classic Brag ==
The earliest published rules for any form of Brag appear in Richard Seymour's 1721 revision of Charles Cotton's The Compleat Gamester. They are less than complete, but with the aid of later descriptions, can be reconstructed. (Note: The rules are silent, for example, on the number of players, number of cards, direction of play and details of the vying procedure) The following is based on Seymour, supplemented by The New Pocket Hoyle (1810).

Classic Brag is a three-stake game and players ante 3 stakes, one for each phase of the game. Eldest hand deals 3 cards to each player in turn, turning the last card dealt to each player face up. The game phases are:

Best Card
In the first phase the player with the highest face-up card won the stakes, cards ranking in their natural order from Ace downwards, except that the A♦ outranked the other Aces.
Bragging
In the second phase, players passed or vied. The procedure is not detailed, but based on the 1810 Hoyle, beginning with elder hand, players would pass or say "I brag" and place a stake. If a player bragged, he could be challenged by another player matching or raising the stake. If two players wished to challenge, the elder took precedence. Vying continued between the two players until one passed or said "I'll see you" or the equivalent whereupon both revealed their hands. A prial (or pair royal) beat a pair which beat a single card. Two pair royals were decided by their ranking; likewise two pairs and so on. The J♣ was a wild card, which could represent any other card, but a natural hand beat a 'wild' hand i.e. one with the Knave (Note: Jacks were then referred to as Knaves.) of Clubs. Some circles also admitted the 9♦ as a wild card.
Thirty One
In the third phase, players scored their hands and the first player to reach exactly 31 or, if no-one did, was closest to 31, won the stakes. To that end, courts and Aces scored 10 and pips their face value. Players could improve their hand by drawing a card from the stock, but if they 'drew out', i.e. exceeded 31, they lost. If two or more scored the same, they drew again until a winner was established. (Note: Presumably if two or more drew 30 or 31, it was either a draw or positional priority applied.)

== American Brag ==
In 1825, the first American account of Brag appeared in a New York edition of Hoyle's Games Improved. This was a far more elaborate variant based solely on the bragging phase of classic Brag.

== Modern Brag ==
Modern Brag, often called Three-Card Brag to distinguish it from its variants, is a single-stake game. Everyone antes, and players are each dealt three cards face down. There is a single round of betting, with action starting to the left of the dealer. Each player has the option of betting or folding. If there was a previous bet, the player must contribute at least that much more to the pot. (Unlike usual poker betting, a player's previous money contributed to the pot is ignored.) This betting continues until there are only two players left, at which point either player may double the previous bet to see his opponent. At this point, the two hands are revealed, and the player with the better hand takes the entire pot. If there is a tie, the player who is seeing loses.

=== Hand ranks ===
Hands generally follow the same sequence as the five-card hands of poker with some variation created by the differing odds of a three-card hand. By convention a prial (three of a kind) ranks first, above a straight flush, despite a prial being marginally more likely than a straight flush. As there are only three cards, four of a kind and a full house are not possible. Note that unlike poker a straight beats a flush, as three-card flushes are more likely than three-card straights, while the reverse is true of five-card poker hands. Special conventions also usually apply that three 3s is the highest-ranking prial, and Ace-2-3 the highest-ranking straight flush. The full probabilities are as follows:

Hand ranks
Rank	Description	Example	Frequency	Probability
Prial	Three cards of same rank	6 of clubs 6 of diamonds 6 of hearts	52	0.24%
Straight Flush	Three suited cards in sequence	Jack of clubs 10 of clubs 9 of clubs	48	0.22%
Straight	Three cards in sequence	9 of spades 8 of diamonds 7 of clubs	720	3.26%
Flush	Three suited cards	Queen of spades 10 of spades 6 of spades	1,096	4.96%
Pair	Two cards of same rank	2 of diamonds 2 of hearts Queen of hearts	3,744	16.94%
High card	None of the above	Ace of hearts Jack of clubs 10 of hearts	16,440	74.39%
Total hands	-	-	22,100	-

=== Prial ===
In Brag, three-of-a-kind is known as a prial, a word derived from "pair royal". As such, three sevens would be described as "a prial (of) sevens".

In most versions of Brag the highest prial depends on the variant being played, for instance, in three card Brag the highest prial would be a prial of threes, in seven card Brag it would be a prial of sevens and so on. The only exception to this is in four card brag, where the game is played as a three card game, so the highest prial in this instance would be a prial of threes.

=== Straight ===
In Brag a straight is more commonly called a "run", and a straight flush is referred to as a "run on the bounce".

== Variants ==
Four-card Brag
Players are dealt four cards, and must then choose which card to throw away (place at the bottom of the deck) in order to create the best combination. The game is then played in the same way as three-card brag.
Five-card Brag. Five cards are dealt, players discarding two.
Seven-card Brag
Seven cards are dealt, players must choose three cards to play from their hands, or make two hands, with only a successful win if both hands win the pot.
Nine-card Brag
Nine cards are dealt, players sort these into three sets. Four antes are played, one for each set, and a main pot. Each set is then played out, usually without further betting. The winner of each set takes one lot of antes; if a player wins all three sets they receive the main pot as well, otherwise it remains for the next hand. Players must always play the next best available set they have made. Often a player may be able to make two good sets and a poor third (e.g. prial, straight, ten-high), so players that do not think they will be able to win all three will order their hands to leave themselves with a strong third set to protect the main pot.
Thirteen-card Brag
Thirteen cards are dealt, from which players must choose three cards to play. Another variation involves making four hands (or the most possible over a certain standard) from the thirteen cards. Four of a kind can also be played, and is usually rewarded by an additional fee to be paid by the other players, apart from any original stake. Players then show their respective best hands, then second best hands, etc., with each winning hand scoring that player a point, or points. Score is kept on a cribbage board, and is usually either a sprint of 10 or so holes, with one point scored for each winning hand, or played over the full length, or street, of the board, with 4 points awarded to the best highest hand, 3 points to the best second-highest hand, etc. Players not on the board by the time someone wins may have to pay double. Winnings are either a pre-arranged fixed amount from each loser to the winner, or paid proportionate to how far behind the winner they finish. Any player winning all four hands in any round is said to have crashed, and automatically wins the entire game. In some regions the game is known as Crash.
Fifteen card Brag
A normally non-gambling related variant, played as a family game. Each player is dealt fifteen cards, from which they make five three-card tricks. Each player must then lay their tricks down in order, highest first. The winner is the one who wins the most tricks. This variant has a much higher likelihood of more powerful tricks, due to the extra cards. This version can also be played with 10 cards and one card is discarded.
Stop the Bus
Three cards are dealt to each player, and three face-up communal cards are dealt. Players take turns at exchanging one or all (but not two) of their cards for any or all of the communal cards. Play continues until one player 'sticks', or 'knocks', meaning that they are happy with their hand. All the remaining players then exchange one last time before hands are compared. The player with the lowest hand is out, or loses a life.
Faras
Also known as teen patti (literally 'three cards' in Hindi). A variant of the game very popular in Trinidad, India, Bangladesh and Nepal, and played with numerous local variations.

Some of these rules can also lead to games, especially heads-up, becoming tactical, with players avoiding making their best hand until their hand is forced into that last exchange by another player sticking, risking that the card that completes their hand isn't taken by another player in the meantime.

== Betting blind ==
Players also have the option of playing blind (betting without looking at their cards). A blind player's costs are all half as much as an open (non-blind) player's. However, an open player may not raise or see a blind player. If all other players fold to a blind player, at least two variations exist - either the blind player takes the pot and the next round continues as normal; or alternatively, the pot remains, everyone re-antes, and the blind player gets to keep his hand for the next round (in addition to the new one he is dealt). At any time, a player with two blind hands may look at one of them and decide whether to keep it or throw it away. If he keeps it, he throws away the other hand and is considered open. If he throws it away, he keeps the other hand and is still blind. If everyone folds to a blind player with two hands, he must throw away one without looking. As with many rules in card games, regional differences apply to this rule.

== Shuffling ==
Another unusual custom of Brag is that the deck is rarely shuffled. Unless a hand is seen and won by a prial, the cards from the hand are just placed on the bottom of the deck, and the next hand is dealt without shuffling.

== See also ==
- Gilet
- Primero
- Put (card game)
- Post and Pair
- Bouillotte
- Lock, Stock and Two Smoking Barrels, which features three-card brag.

== Literature ==
- Hoyle's Games Improved. New York: G. Long. 1825.
- The complete book of card games. London: Hamlyn. 2001. ISBN 978-0-600-60413-6.
- Dawson, Lawrence Hawkins (1923). Hoyle's Card Games. London: Routledge. ISBN 1-85326-316-8.
- Hardie, Robert (1860). Hoyle Made Familiar. London: Ward and Lock. Robert Hardie was a pseudonym of Eidrah Trebor
- Hoyle, Edmund (1751). A Treatise on Brag. London: Joliffe.
- Hoyle, Edmond (1810). The New Pocket Hoyle. London: Smith.
- Parlett, David (1991). A History of Card Games. Oxford, England: Oxford University Press. ISBN 0-19-282905-X.
- Parlett, David (1992). Oxford A-Z of Card Games. Oxford, England: Oxford University Press.
- Parlett, David (2008). The Penguin book of card games. London: Penguin. ISBN 978-0-141-03787-5.
- Seymour, Richard (1721). The Compleat Gamester. London: Curll.
