= Bouillotte =

18th-century French gambling card game

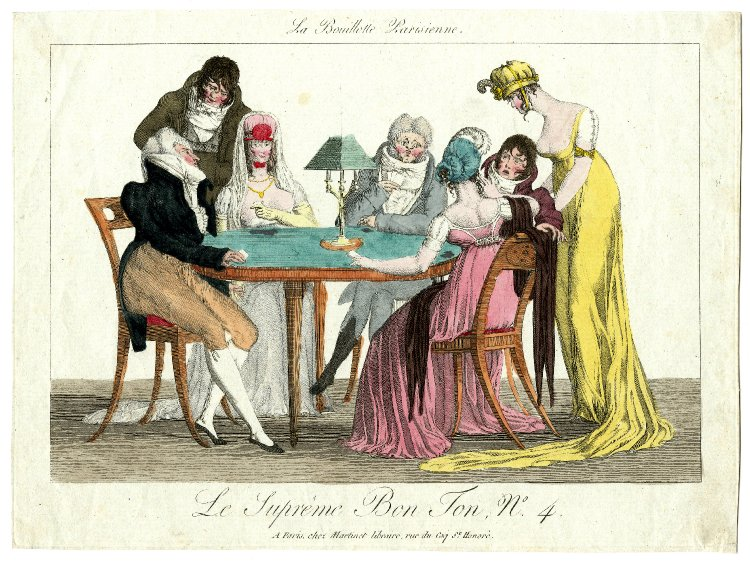
- Game of bouillotte with bouillotte lamp on table
- Origin: France
- Type: Vying
- Players: 3-5
- Cards: 20-24 cards
- Deck: Picket deck
- Play: Clockwise
- Playing time: 5 min.
- Chance: Easy

Bouillotte is an 18th-century French gambling card game of the Revolution based on Brelan, very popular during the 19th century in France and again for some years from 1830. It was also popular in America. The game is regarded as one of the games that influenced the open-card stud variation in poker. The rules continue to be printed in French gaming compendia. (Note: See e.g. Gerver (2007), pp. 84–87.)

== Game ==
A piquet pack is used, reduced to twenty cards by removing the sevens, tens and Jacks. When five people play, the Jacks are not removed, and when three play, the queens are taken out as well. The ace is the highest card in play and in cutting. Two packs are usually used, so that while one is being used, the other can be shuffled. Counters or chips, as in poker, are used.

To determine where a person sits, a sequence of cards is taken out of the deck, equal to the number of players (e.g., with 4 players, an ace, king, queen, and nine are taken, etc.) They are shuffled, and each player draws one. The player with the ace chooses where to sit first, etc. First dealer is the player with the king.

Before the deal each player "antes" one counter to the pot, after which each, the "age" passing, may "raise" the pot; those not "seeing the raise" being obliged to drop out. Three cards are dealt to each player, and a thirteenth, called the retourné, when four play, turned up. Each player must then bet, call, raise or drop out. When a call is made the hands are shown and the best hand wins. The hands rank as follows:

- Brélan Carré, four of a kind, one being the retourné.
- Simple Brélan, three of a kind, ace being high.
- Brélan Favori, three of a kind, one being the retourné.

== Payments ==
If more than one player has a brélan, the best is one that matches the rank of the turn up (a brelan carré, or "squared-up brelan"). If none matches, that of highest rank wins. Any player with a brelan receives a side-payment of one chip, two if it is a carré, from each opponent.

If no player holds a brélan, the hand holding the greatest number of pips wins. All hands are turned face up, including those of players who dropped. The face values of all these cards are totalled for each suit, ace counting 11, court cards 10 and numerals their face value. The "best suit" is the one with the highest visible total, and the player holding the highest card of it wins the pot, provided that he has not previously dropped. If he has, the winner is the player counting the greatest face value of cards in any other suit.

== Bouillotte lamp ==
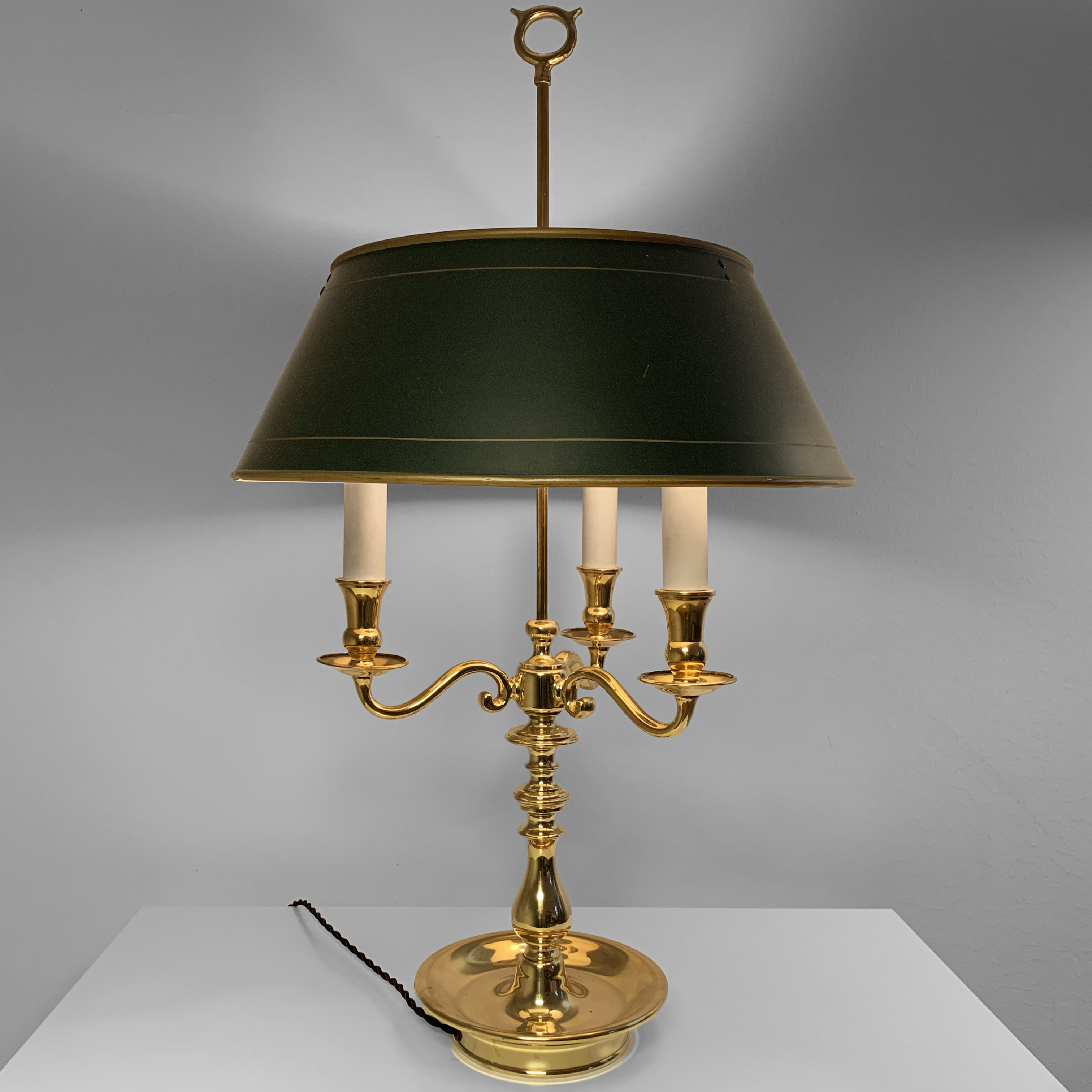
Bouillotte style table lamp, with three light points and height-adjustable shade, made of polished brass and green-lacquered sheet metal shade with hand-painted gold decoration

The game gave rise to the Bouillotte lamp, consisting of one or several candlesticks with a central standard equipped with a non-flammable adjustable shade. often made of tôle, a painted or lacquered metal, reflective white on the inside, dark on the outside, that could be lowered as the candles burned down.

== See also ==
- Put (card game)
- Brelan
- Ambigu
- Gilet

== Literature ==
- Gerver, Frans (2007) [1966]. Tous Les Jeux Des Cartes (reprint of first edition). Spain: Marabout.
