= Ambigu =

Card game

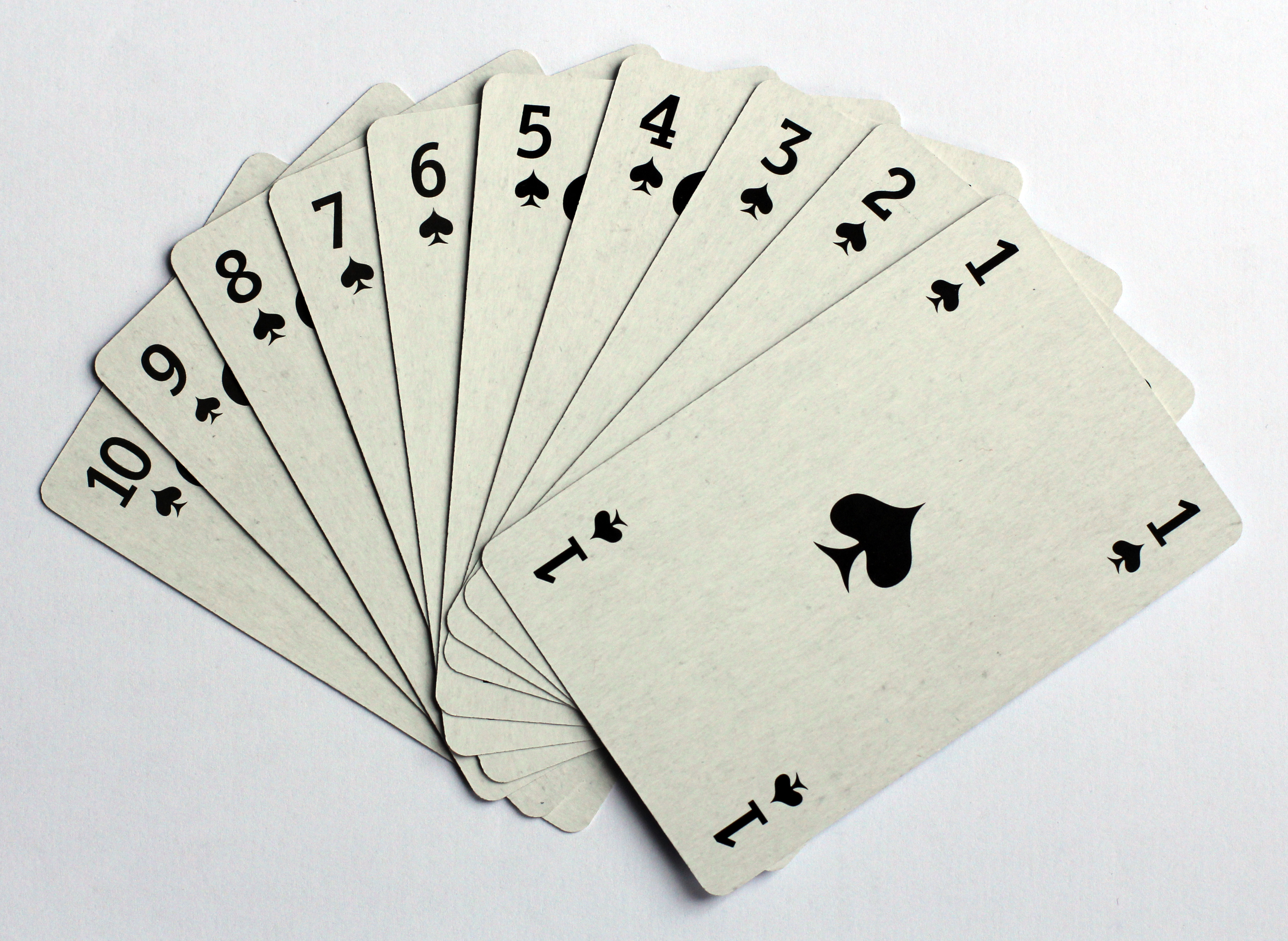
- The suit of Spades in Ambigu
- Origin: France
- Alternative names: Meslé, Mêlé
- Players: 2 – 6
- Cards: 40
- Deck: French-suited pack
- Play: Anticlockwise

Ambigu is an historical French vying game, composed of the characteristic elements of Whist, Bouillotte and Piquet. A Whist pack with the court cards removed is used, and from two to six persons may play. Each player is given an equal number of counters, and a limit of betting is agreed upon.

== History ==
The rules of Ambigu, then also known as Meslé, first appear in 1659, the game being much in vogue at the time of Louis XIV who reigned from 1643 to 1714. It continued to be recorded in French gaming compendia throughout the 19th century and, occasionally, up to the present century.

== Gameplay ==
Two cards are dealt, one at a time, to each player, after each has anted two counters in a pool. Each player then either keeps his hand, saying "Enough," or takes one or two new cards from the top of the stock; after which the stock is reshuffled and cut, and each player receives two more cards, one at a time.

The players then either "play" or "pass." If a person "plays," he bets a number of counters and the others may equal this bet or raise it. Should no player meet the first bet, the bettor takes back his bet, leaving the pool intact, and receives two counters from the last player who refuses to play. When two or more bet the same number, they again draw cards and " pass " or "play" as before. If all "pass," each pays a counter to the pool and a new deal ensues. The player betting more than the others call wins the pool. He then exposes his hand and is paid by each adversary according to its value.

The hands rank as follows: "Point," the number of pips on two or more cards of a suit (one counter). "Prime," four cards of different suits (two counters). "Grand Prime," the same with the number of pips over 30 (three counters). "Sequence," a hand containing three cards of the same suit in sequence (three counters). "Tricon," three of a kind (four counters). "Flush," four cards of the same suit (five counters). "Doublet," a hand containing two counting combinations at once, as 2, 3, 4 and 7 of spades, amounting to both a "sequence" and a "flush" (eight counters). "Fredon," four of a kind (the highest possible hand), ten or eleven counters, according to the number of pips. Ties are decided by the number of pips.

== See also ==
- Auction Pitch
- All Fours
- Reversis
- Put (card game)
- Gilet
