= Gilet (card game) =

16th-century Italian gambling card game

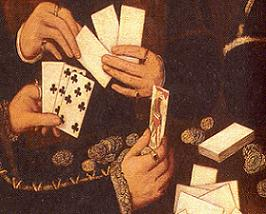
- Origin: Italy
- Alternative names: Gile
- Family: Matching
- Players: 2-4
- Skills: Chance
- Cards: 32
- Deck: Italian
- Play: Clockwise
- Playing time: 20 min.
- Chance: Medium

Related games
- Brelan, Gé, Point, Flux et Sequence, Primero

Gilet, also Gile, Gillet, is a 16th-century Italian gambling card game that probably predates the game of Primero. Rabelais, in 1534, gives it pride of place in his list of games played by Gargantua, and Cardano, in 1564, describes it as Geleus, from the word Geleo, meaning "I have it".

== History ==
=== Italian version ===
One of the Italian versions of the name is Gilè. The Manuale dei Giuochi, published in Trieste in 1863 lists a series of games played in Italy at the time, and among them the game of Gilet. In John Florio's 1611 dictionary it is explained that the game of Gilet was "like our poste and paire", being "Gé" (spelled J'ai), the word for "Pair", which is one of the announcements in the French version.

=== French version ===
The name Gilet changed to Brelan in the time of Henry IV of France (1589–1610), the first occurrence of Brelan in French being dated 1608. But there is no evidence that Brelan derives from Gilet. The Gilet of 18th century France was a three-card game of two deals, the first for a fixed stake won by the best pair or triplet, the second vied for in respect of the best-held flush-point. It first appeared in the Académie Universelle des Jeux in 1718, although its earlier references date of 1610 and 1640.

=== Spanish version ===
The Spanish variant is described by Barnes as "Giley", who says it was much played at horse fairs, and hence, by association, a gypsy game. It was played by four or more players who were dealt four cards each from a 28-card pack and a showdown was won by the best flush-point. With Ace worth 11, courts, treys, and deuces 10 each, and Seven worth 7, so a four-flush would be worth 37-41 points, a three-flush 27-30, and so on. Not dissimilar is Golfo, a game of Basque origin, declared by Barnes to be the king of gambling games and played also as Goffo in Italy and Gofo in Uruguay.

== Game ==
The game of Gilet is played by four players, all of whom play for themselves in the long run. A Piquet deck of 32 cards is used, 7 to A. The aces are higher than the king, which is higher than the queen, which is higher than the jack and so on.

After examining their cards, each contributes with two counters, worth as much as it is agreed by the players, to a common pot in the middle of the table. The dealer then gives three cards to each of the players, one after the other.

Any of the two pots in the middle of the table is entitled for the Gé, or Pair. It is possible for the players to bet on pairs, and that player who has the highest pair draws the money previously deposited in the pot and also the betting from the other players, unless one or more have a tricon, the highest combination of cards, that is, three aces, three kings, three queens and so on.

When one of the players win with a pair, the game then conveys to the second pot entitled for the Point or Flow. To have flow is to have three cards of the same suit, etc. It depends not only on the first player to stay on a simple game or bet whatever he wants for the second pot, but also on the second player to raise the bet staked by the first player or to concede the amount bet passing, in case he does not have a good hand.

Two aces are worth twenty and a half, one ace and a king, or another card of the same suit which is worth ten, are then worth twenty one and a half. Also two aces and a king, or another card of the same suit which is worth ten, are worth twenty one and half, also the other cards which are worth their value, and which must be of the same suit to add the number of the several cards together. After that, the player bets as much as he wants and those players who hold higher combinations continue the game, that is to say, if they have Flow or not. We say that whoever has more points always wins, because the player with the highest Flow always has more points.

== See also ==
- Brelan
- Ambigu
- Primo visto
