= List of games prohibited in Austria-Hungary =

In 1904, the Imperial and Royal Ministry of Justice (k. u. k. Justizministerium) published the following list of games prohibited in Austria-Hungary. It was expanded by the state of Austria in 1933, was exemplary in Austria for many years and now represents a culturally and historically interesting list of the sort of gambling that was popular at that time.

It is particularly noteworthy that there are also some bowling and billiard games on this list, which today are regarded more as games of skill.

== List of prohibited games (1904) ==
On 30 June 1904 a law was passed by the Ministry of Justice of the Empire of Austria-Hungary which designated the following games as "prohibited games":

1. Pharao
2. Paschen (dice game)
3. Einundzwanzig (Twenty-One) and the similar Halbzwölf
4. Zwicken (also Labet, Tippen, Pochen) and its variant, Kleinpréférence
5. Angehen (also called Frische Vier)
6. Bakkarat (Makao)
7. Tartel with open Terzen
8. Kartentombola (also Grüne Wiese)
9. Stoß (Naschi-Waschi, also Meine Tante – Deine Tante)
10. Poker
11. Färbeln
12. Roulette and the similar Wettrennspiel
13. Booky or Sixer Domino
14. Polnische Bank (Panczok, Mauscheln)
15. Farbenbank
16. Stoßpudelspiel
17. Lampeln
18. Die heilige Wahrheit or Herzaß
19. Bauernschreck or "The Red One Wins" (die Rote gewinnt)
20. the skittles game of Halbzwölf
21. the skittles game of Schanzeln

The following were also classed as prohibited games:

Chemin de fer, Rouge et noir, Trente et quarante, Trente et un, Vingt et un, Feuer, Belle (with boards and numbers), Billardquartscheiben, Biribi or Cavagnole, Elf hoch (with 3 dice), Esperanz (with 2 dice), Fräulein Tini, Häufeln, Grad – Ungrad, Kreiselspiel or Diplomat (with 9 skittles and a spinning top).

== List of prohibited games (1933) ==
On 2 January 1933, Austria confirmed and extended the list of banned games as follows: (The changes from the 1904 list are shown in italics.)

1. Pharao
2. Dice games
3. Einundzwanzig and the similar Halbzwölf
4. Zwicken (also Labet, Tippen, Pochen, Dreiblatt) and its variant, Kleinpreference
5. Angehen (frische Vier)
6. Bakkarat (Makao)
7. Tartl with open Terzen
8. Kartentombola (also grüne Wiese) and its variant "Gottes Segen bei Kohn"
9. Stoß (Naschi-Waschi, also Meine Tante – Deine Tante)
10. Poker
11. Färbeln
12. Roulette and all roulette-like games, especially Pferdchen – or Wettrennspiel, Dreikugelspiel, Deltaspiel, Uranusspiel, Troulaspiel, Kartenroulette, Astroulette, Germaniaspiel, Spiralospiel, Habilisspiel, Beobaspiel, Pedegespiel, Hansaspiel, Atlantikspiel, Roulyspiel, Visiblaspiel, Bäderspiel, Ballaspiel and Laboulespiel
13. Booky or Sixer Domino
14. Polnische Bank (Panczok, Wick, Mauscheln)
15. Farbenbank
16. Stoßpudelspiel
17. Lampeln
18. Die heilige Wahrheit or Herzas
19. "The Red One Wins", also called Kümmelblättchen
20. Jouettespiel
21. Glücksrad
22. Balanceleiterspiel
23. Games with gaming machines, unless they have a certificate issued by the Federal Ministry of Finance that the activity constitutes a game of skill.
