= Kvitlech =

Jewish card game

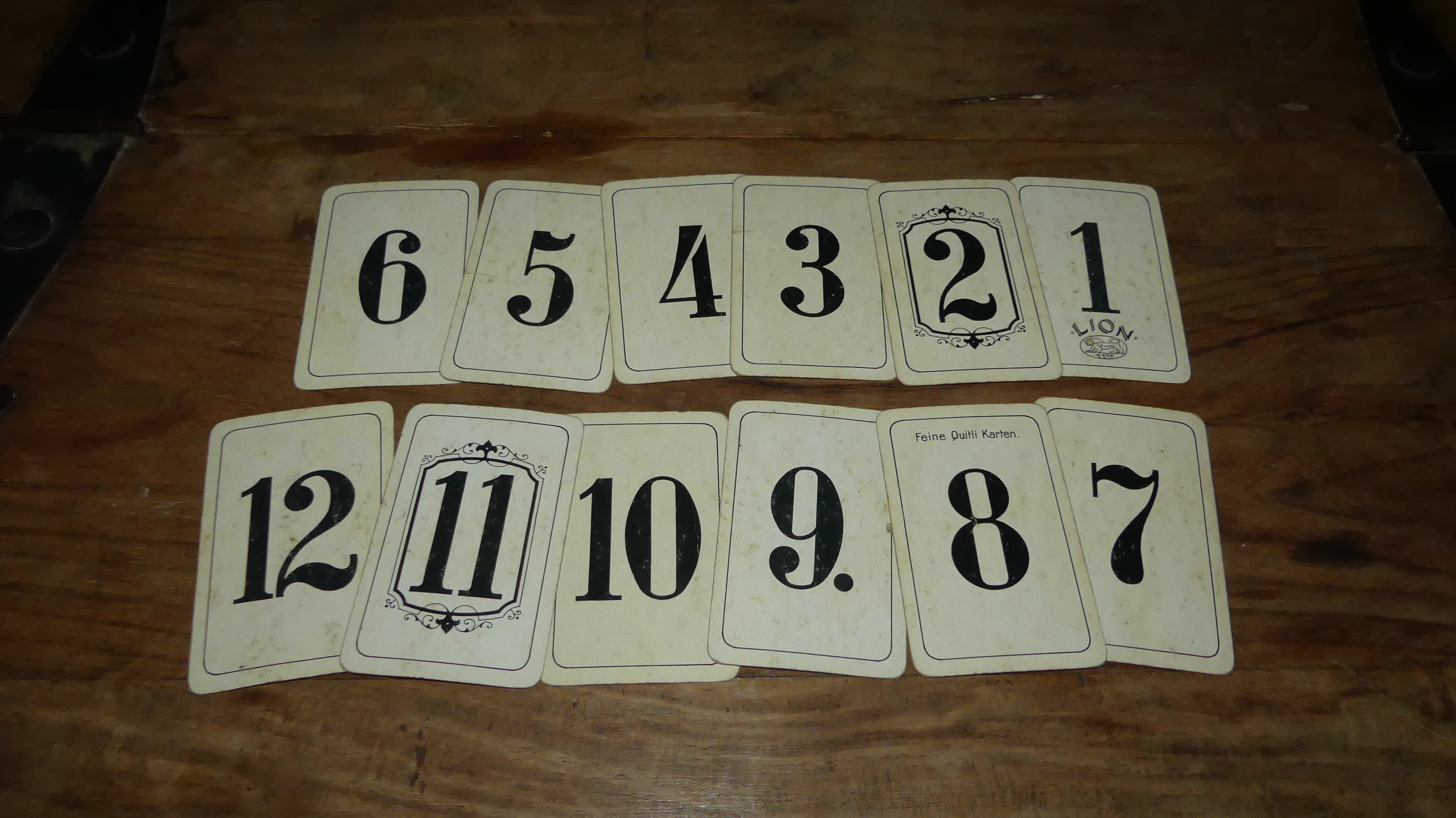
- Kvitlech cards
- Origin: Galician Jews
- Release date: Late 18th or 19th century
- Players: 5+
- Cards: 24 or 31

Related games
- Twenty-One, Pontoon, Dreidel

Kvitlech (Yiddish: קוויטלעך, lit. 'notes', 'slips') (Note: Also spelled Kwitlech, Kvitlekh, Kvitlakh, Kvitlach, Quitli and Quitlok.) is a card game similar to Twenty-One played in some Ashkenazi Jewish homes during the Hanukkah season.

The game and deck were likely created by Hassidic Jews living in Galicia during the late 18th or 19th century. Most packs used to play the game consist of 24 cards with identical pairs numbered from 1 to 12. The pack may have originated from Hexenspiel decks by stripping them of picture cards so as to avoid idolatry. Jews did not use popular playing cards because of the crosses and other Christian symbols found on them, using instead an (often handmade) deck of cards called kvitlekh, lamed-alefniks (lit. 'thirty-oners'), klein Shas (lit. 'small Talmud'), or tilliml (lit. 'small Book of Psalms'). The cards were decorated with Hebrew numerals and common objects such as teapots, feathers, and sometimes portraits of biblical heroes. Piatnik & Söhne of Vienna was the largest producer of these cards during the 19th and 20th centuries which helped spread the game among Jews living in Austria-Hungary and their North American diaspora.

== Bibliography ==
- Smith, Anthony G. (February 1991). "The 'Cambio' Packs and the Games Played with Them. I. Hexenspiel and Quittli". The Playing-Card. XIX (3): 93–102.
