= My Aunt, Your Aunt =

My Aunt, Your Aunt is the English translation of the common German phrase, Meine Tante, deine Tante and may refer to:

== Films ==
- My Aunt, Your Aunt (1927 film), a German silent comedy directed by Carl Froelich
- My Aunt, Your Aunt (1939 film), a German comedy starring Ralph Arthur Roberts
- My Aunt, Your Aunt (1956 film), a West German comedy starring Theo Lingen

== Other ==
- Meine Tante - Deine Tante, a popular German card game
