= Buki-Domino =

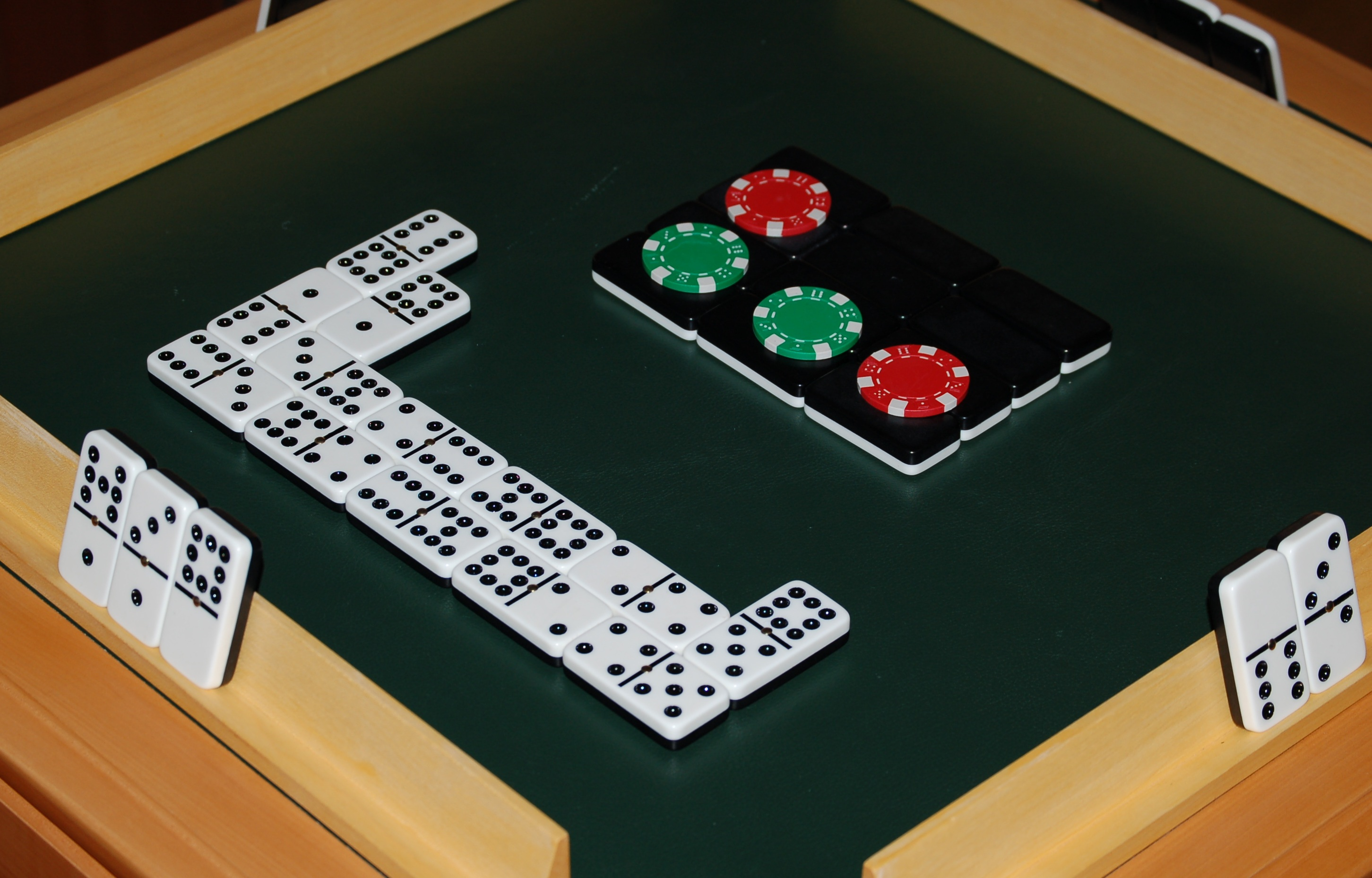
A partie of Buki-Domino. The player's stakes are placed on the Stamm. The setting of the tiles is done in the (old-)Austrian manner.

Buki-Domino or Buki (German: Bukidomino, Buki-Domino, Booky-Domino, Buki or Sechser-Domino), is a gambling game that was widely played in Vienna in the early 20th century.

== History ==
Buki-Domino is mentioned in the literature by Joseph Roth (Zipper und sein Vater), Egon Erwin Kisch ("Lederbranche" in Nachlese) and in the 15th chapter of the novel Zwischen neun und neun by Leo Perutz, which is entirely devoted to the precise description of a Buki partie.

The game was banned in early September 1916 by the Austrian government in § 522 öStGB.

The Austrian word, Buki, is derived from English, 'bookie' (more rarely 'booky'), the abbreviation for 'bookmaker'. Around 1900, the English term 'bookmaker' was used in the German language in horse racing; only later did the Germanized term, Buchmacher, prevail. The connection with betting on horses is made clear in Perutz's novel, firstly in the sense that players are betting "as if on racehorses" and, secondly, Perutz has this episode take place in the "Café Turf" .

"Booky-Domino" or "Sechser-Domino" is cited in the list of games prohibited in Austria-Hungary. By contrast, according to Beck Buki-Spiel with seven tiles per player is not considered a game of chance and is tolerated by the authorities.

== Description ==
This description below is based on Perutz's novel and the sources listed in the bibliography.

Four players play a game of "normal domino"; that is block domino for four people. Dominoes used to be played with 36 pieces in Austria: you took the 45 pieces of a double-eight set and removed the nine double ([0-0], [1|1] to [8-8]). The tiles are shuffled face down by the gamemaster, the Buki or banker, each player receiving six tiles, the banker collecting his last. The remaining tiles form the Stamm and are not used in the course of the game.

The first hand of a partie begins with the player who has the heaviest tile, i.e. number [8–7], if it is not in the Stamm. After the first player, the other players each set a tile in turn; the game is played counter-clockwise. Anyone who cannot set must sit out; there is no 'buying'. The player who places all his tiles first is the winner. In a blocked game, i.e. when none of the four players can play, the player with the fewest pips in his hand wins.

Before each game, in addition to the participating players, the spectators, kiebitzers or 'gallerists' (Galleristen), can bet on one of the four active players or, according to Unger and Beck, on one of the three opponents of the banker. These bets with the Buki.

'Gallery' is a nickname for the Viennese underworld. The name is derived from police photo files that were known as the gallery; the criminals portrayed within it were called gallerists. (cf. Stoß)

The winner of a game has the lead in the next game (i.e., he may place the first tile); he must place his bet before playing the first tile. The other players may – according to Beck – hold their bets until it is their third turn to play or – according to Unger – may make bets as long as they still have at least five tiles.

== Odds and house advantage ==
If the player you bet on wins, you get triple your money from the Buki. As Perutz's description clearly shows, this means odds of 2 : 1: After Stanislaus Demba, the main character in the novel, has bet 10 kroner and won, he now has 30 kroner and so his profit is only 20 kroner. So then he leaves his stakes and winnings in place – he bets "money on money" – and wins again, which increases his fortune to 90 kroner. After another win, he has 270 kroner and is then cheated by the Buki for the win and the original stake.

Since the Buki only pays odds of 2 : 1 instead of the fair odds of 3 : 1 in the event of a win, he wins an average of 25% of the bets made (house advantage). Beck gives odds of 2½ : 1, the house advantage is then 12.5 percent.

With these calculations, the – very unrealistic – requirement applies that a player risks the same stake in every single game – regardless of whether they are allowed to place the first tile or not. If the players do not have to place all of their bets before picking up the tiles, this improves their chances considerably.

The ratio between the minimum and maximum stake is decisive to the players' chances, with a ratio of 3: 1 between maximum and minimum as appropriate. A small ratio between minimum and maximum favours the banker, a large ratio shifts the advantage in favour of the opponent.

== Literature ==
- Beck, Fritz (1960). Domino in vielen Spielarten, Vienna: Perlen Reihe
- Perutz, Leo. Zwischen neun und neun, dtv
- Unger, Franz (1913). Domino, Buki-Domino, Karten-Domino, Cooncan. 5th edn. Vienna and Leipzig: Wenedikt's Spielbücher
