= Ferme (card game) =

French gambling game

- Very early French banking game
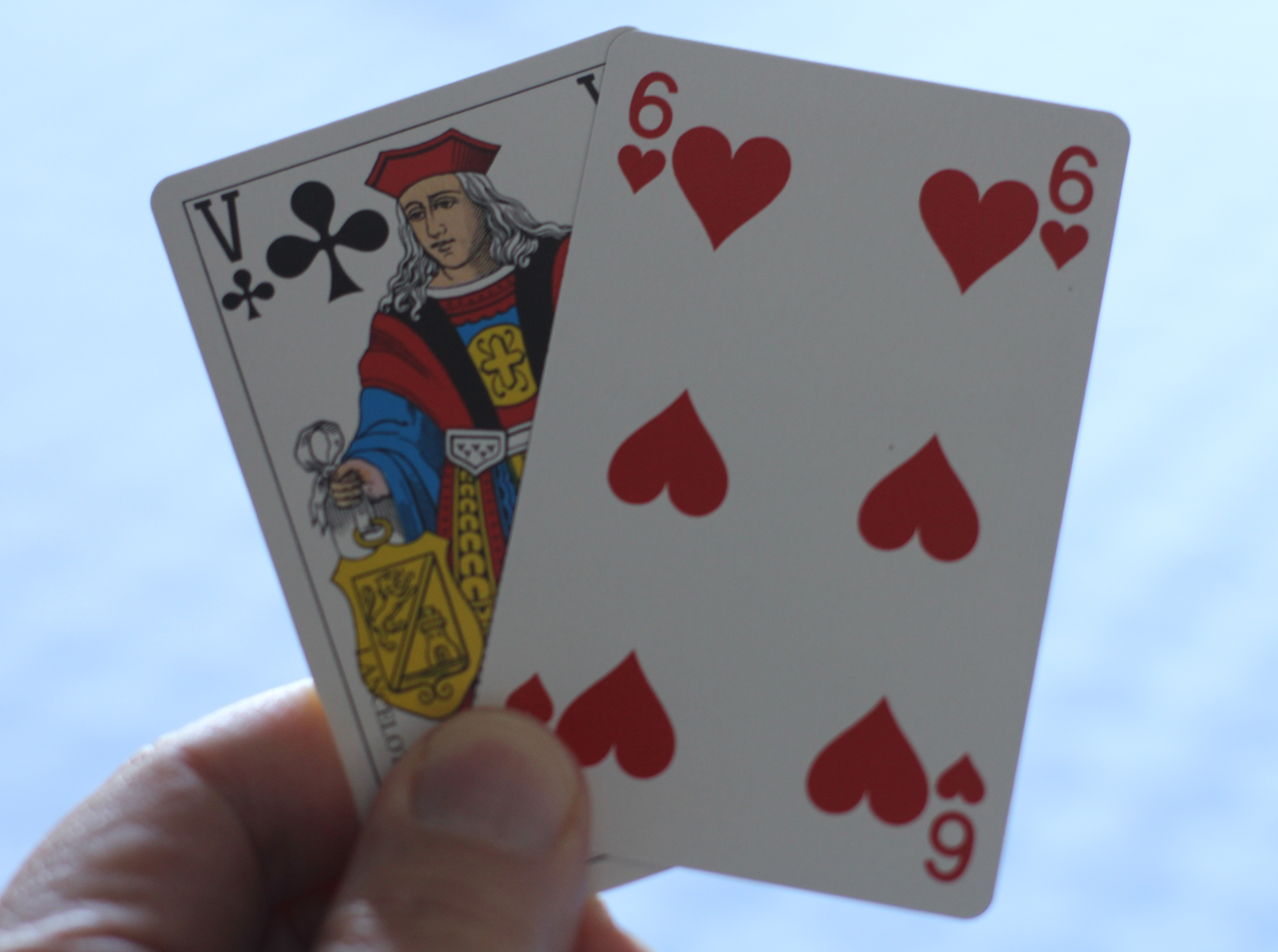
- Winning combination: a court card and the brillant
- Origin: France
- Type: Banking game
- Players: up to 10–12
- Cards: 45
- Deck: Paris pattern, French-suited
- Play: Anticlockwise

Related games
- Quinze, Twenty-One

Ferme ('farm') is an historical French gambling game of the banking type for ten to twelve players that dates to the mid-17th century. It was described then as being "fun and recreational".

== History ==
The game is first mentioned in 1640 and first described by de la Marinière in 1659, but continued to be regularly featured in French games compendia until the end of the 19th century, for example, in Boussac (1896).

According to Parlett (1991), "'farm' is metaphorical for 'bank', and the proprietors of Parisian gaming houses were known as 'farmers'". Ferme is ancestral to the American game of farmer which was purportedly played in rural parts of America "well into the 20th century".

== Rules ==
=== Earliest rules (1659) ===
De la Marinière's 1659 rules are sketchy, but essentially players vie for the right to become the farmer which is the name of the banker in this game. The highest bidder becomes the farmer and places his bid amount, called the farm, "under the candelabra or in the coin purse". The 8s are removed from the pack, (Note: Presumably this is a 52-card pack, but de la Marinière does not elaborate.) the reason being that these cards would enable players to make the target score of 16 too easily. Each player except the farmer also antes a stake to the pool. Court cards score 10 points each and pip cards score their face value, Aces being worth 1 point.

The farmer deals one card to each opponent from the top of the pack and then another from the bottom. Players may then call for more cards, one by one, to try to get closer to 16. (Note: This is not explicit, but implied by the rule on sticking to avoid overshooting 16.) If a player's hand cards exceed 16, that player pays the farmer one jeton for every excess point. If no-one scores 16, the player who is nearest 16 without exceeding it, wins the pool, but not the farm. Players on 12 to 15 points may 'stick' to avoid exceeding 16 and having to pay the farmer. A player scoring exactly 16, wins the farm and contents of the pool, 'deposing' the current farmer and taking over as farmer for the next round.

=== Later rules (1800) ===
Over time, the rules became more detailed and elaborate. The following is based on Lacombe (1800), but very much reflect Parlett's 1991 summary.

All 8s and 6s are removed from a standard 52-card pack with the exception of the ♥6, known as the 'brilliant one' (brillant) to leave 45 cards. As before, courts count 10 points and pips their face value. Again the player who bid the highest amount for the farm puts it aside to be won by the player who dispossesses the farmer. The rest ante a jeton to the pool or partie. The farmer shuffles the pack, has the player to the left cut them and deals one card each, anticlockwise beginning with eldest hand, the player to their right.

Beginning with eldest, players have the right to ask for one or more cards in succession until they are satisfied with their hand. These fresh cards are taken from the bottom of the talon. If, at any stage, the sum of the points on the cards in a player's hand exceed 16, that player pays the farmer the number of jetons corresponding to the excess points. So a player with a score of 20 in cards, pays 4 jetons. A player wishing to stick says basta and does not have to pay anything. Although forfeiting the chance of winning the farm, such a player may still win the pool. The player whose score is closest to 16 without overshooting it, wins the pool.

A player who scores exactly 16 wins the farm and the pool. If two or more have 16, the following criteria are decisive in the order given:

- The brilliant and a 10-point card beat any other combination
- Two cards beat three cards; three beat four, etc.
- In the event of a tie, positional priority applies

A player who wins the farm deposes the farmer and takes over unless players agree that the role of farmer will rotate in turn.

== Bibliography ==
- Boussac, Jean (1896). Encyclopédie des Jeux de Cartes. Paris: Ernest Kohr.
- De la Marinière, E. (1659). La maison académique. 2nd edn. Estienne Loison, Paris.
- Lacombe, Jacques (1800). Encyclopédie Méthodique: Dictionaire des Jeux. Padoue.
- Parlett, David (1991), A History of Card Games, Oxford: Oxford University Press, ISBN 0-19-282905-X
- Parlett, David (2008), The Penguin Book of Card Games, London: Penguin, ISBN 978-0-141-03787-5
