= Va Bank =

Va Bank may refer to:

- Va banque, a gambling expression meaning to risk all on one bet
- Va banque (film), a 1920 film
- Va Bank (horse), a racehorse
- Va-Bank, the Georgian version of Deal or No Deal
- Va banque!, known in English as Jeopardy! Poland.
- Vabank, a 1981 film
- Vabank (album), album by Mrozu
