= Macao (dice game) =

Simple dice game

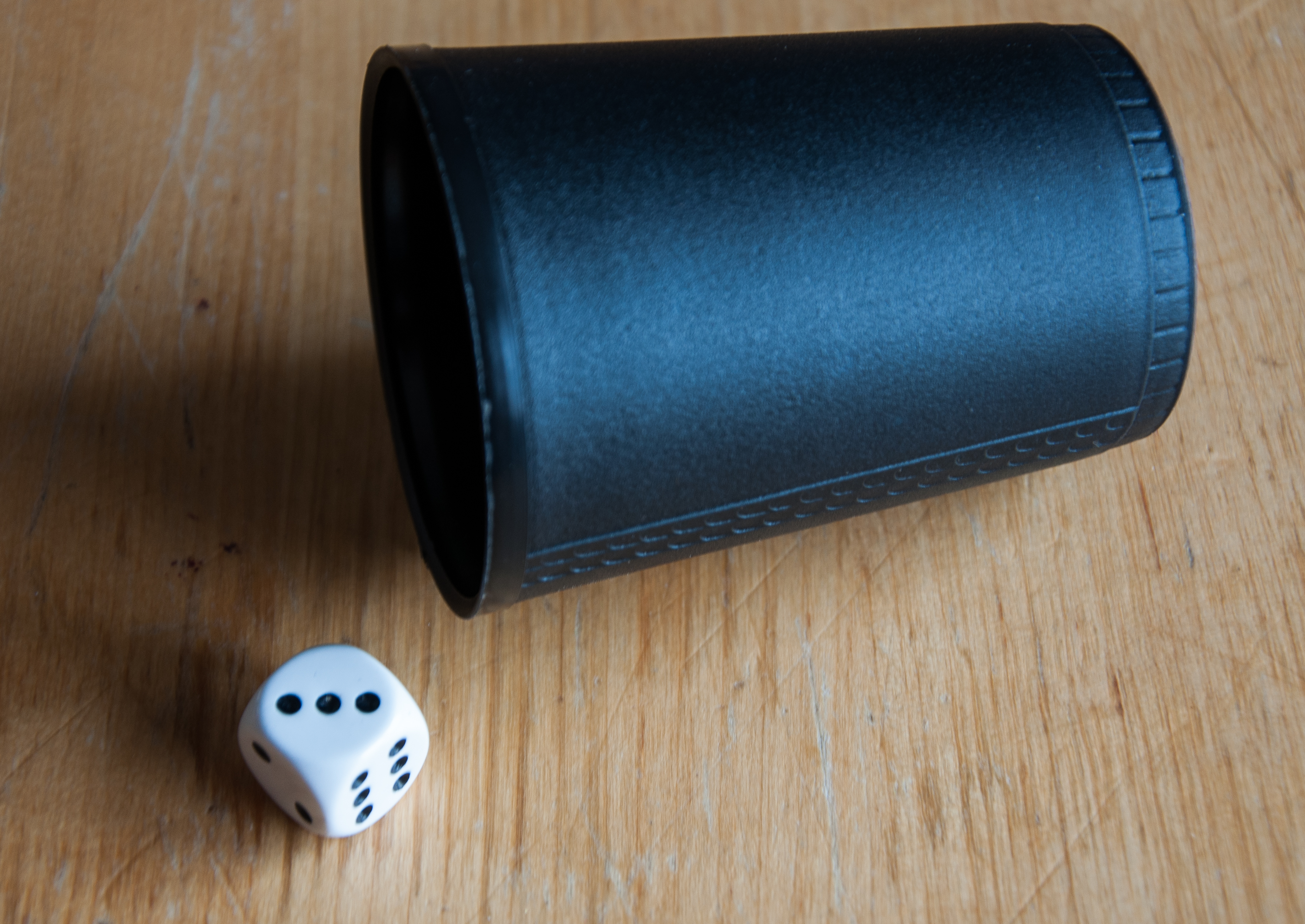
Macao is played with a single die and die cup.

Makao, Macao or Böse Neun is a simple dice game for any number of players using a single die and a dice cup. It is a game in which the players must reach a specified score without exceeding it, in that way it resembles other dice games like Über 12 ist tot ("Over 12 is Dead") or Fünfzehn ("Fifteen") as well as the card games of Siebzehn und Vier and Black Jack. It is derived from the eponymous card game of Macao, which itself is a possible predecessor of the popular gambling game of Baccara. Like its eponymous cousin, its name comes from the city of Macao, the "Monte Carlo of the East".

In game compendia that include dice, Macao or similar games are usually included in the rule booklets.

== Playing ==
The game is played by each player in turn. Each player throws the die as often as desired and attempts to get as close to a score of nine with the sum of his throws. Each player who scores more points, is "dead" and drops out. The winner is the player who scores exactly nine or, if none do, the player who gets closest to a score of nine without exceeding it.

The target score may be varied. In the game of Fifteen (Fünfzehn) the same rules are followed but the target is fifteen points. In Over Twelve is Dead (Über 12 ist tot) the target score is twelve and players must throw three times, after which they may risk a fourth throw if they wish.

As in similar games the tactics and risk appetite of the players are deciding factors. The later players in a deal have the advantage of knowing the throws of the earlier players and can make their decision about further throws accordingly.

== Literature ==
- „Makao“ In: Erhard Gorys: Das Buch der Spiele. Manfred Pawlak Verlagsgesellschaft, Herrsching o. J.; p. 401.
- „Makao“ In: Friedrich Pruss: Würfelspiele. Falken Verlag, Niedernhausen 1998; p. 9. ISBN 3-635-60129-2.
- „Fünfzehn“ In: Robert E. Lembke: Das große Haus- und Familienbuch der Spiele. Lingen Verlag, Köln o. J.; p. 244–245.
