= Pontoon (card game) =

Card game

- British version of twenty-one
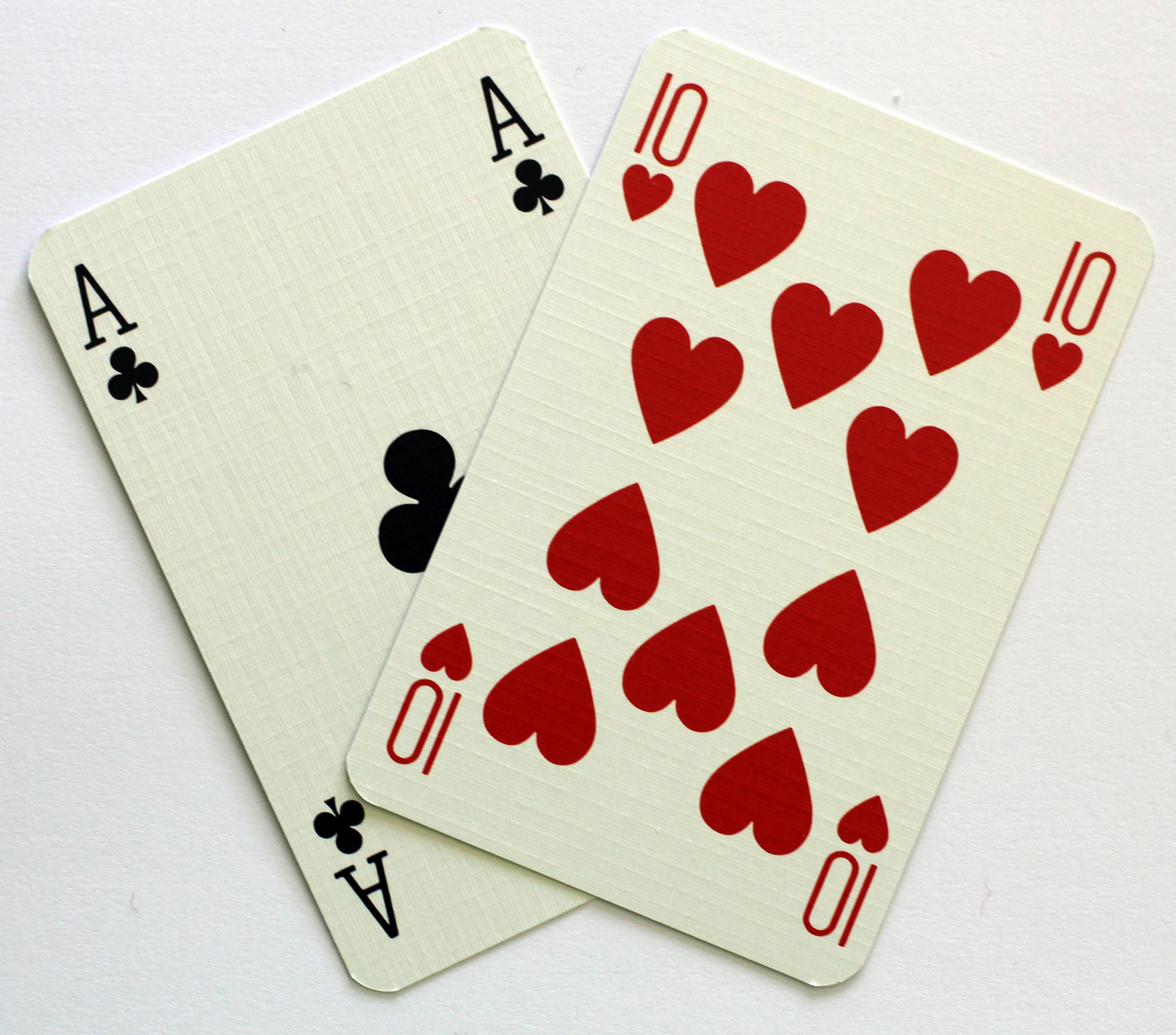
- An ace and ten score twenty-one
- Origin: United Kingdom
- Alternative names: Vingt-un (obsolete), twenty-one
- Type: Comparing
- Players: usually 3–7
- Skills: Probability
- Cards: 52
- Deck: French
- Play: Clockwise
- Chance: High

Related games
- Twenty-One

Pontoon, formerly called vingt-un, is a card game of the banking family for three to ten players and the "British domestic version of Twenty-One," a game first recorded in 17th-century Spain, but which spread to France, Germany and Britain in the late 18th century, and America during the early 19th century. It is neither a variant of nor derived from Blackjack. Both are descended from the early British version of vingt-un. In Britain, it first became known as pontoon during the First World War, the name apparently being a soldier's corruption of its former French name. The game has no official rules and varies widely from place to place. It is a popular family game, but also widely played by children, students, and members of the armed forces. In 1981, pontoon was the third most popular card game in Britain after rummy and whist. It has been described as "an amusing round game and one which anyone can learn in a few minutes."

== History ==
Vingt-un is first recorded in the second half of the 18th century in France, Britain and Prussia, but its first rules were published in 1800 in Britain, and elaborations of this simple game were developed over the course of the 19th century. The name "pontoon" appeared during the First World War and appears to be a soldier's corruption of the French vingt-un. It is recorded as such in 1917 by an American soldier who served with the British during the First World War, where he describes pontoon as one of the pastimes played by "Tommy" when off duty and equates it to the American "black jack or twenty-one", adding that "the banker is the only winner." Another name that was probably also a mispronunciation was Van John.

It took time for the new name to be established; in 1939 it was still referred to as vingt-et-un with the name "pontoon" being given as an alternative. The game's popularity continued unabated such that, by 1981, it had become the 3rd most popular card game in Britain after Rummy and Whist, a phenomenon possibly helped by the prominence of its casino game forms known as Blackjack or Twenty-One. Unlike the latter, however, it has no official rules and consequently its manner of play varies widely from place to place. It is very much an informal family game, but is also popular with children, students, workers and members of the armed forces.

== Rules ==
The following rules give a brief illustration of the development of pontoon from its progenitor vingt-un as it was played around 1800, to the more elaborated rules developed during the 19th century and finally to pontoon as it is typically played today.

=== Cards ===
The game is played with a standard, 52-card, French-suited pack, without Jokers. The values of the cards are as follows: an Ace scores 1 or 11 as desired; court cards score 10 each and the pip cards score their face value. If the two cards dealt to a player (excluding any subsequently drawn) are an Ace and a court card or an Ace and a Ten, they score 21 exactly and the combination is called a natural or a natural vingt-un.

The game may be played by two or more players, six or eight being best according to "Trumps" and five or six according to Arnold, who sets an upper limit of ten players. Phillips and Westall suggest the use of a second pack if more than seven play. "Trumps" merely states that two or more packs may be combined "if the party is large".

=== Vingt-un (1800) ===
The following is a summary of the earliest known rules for vingt-un, published in the 1800 edition of Hoyle's Games.

The first dealer is chosen by any agreed method, e.g. the first player to turn up an Ace becomes the dealer. It is likely that deal and play were clockwise and that players staked a fixed amount before the deal, but the rules are vague on these points.

The dealer deals two cards to each player, one at a time, before asking players, in rotation and beginning with eldest hand (on the dealer's left), whether they want to 'stand' or choose another card. In the latter case, the dealer gives the player the top card from the pack. The player may continue to ask for more cards until 21 is reached or exceeded or the player decides to stand. If 21 is exceeded, the player immediately throws the cards up and pays the stake laid to the dealer.

The dealer may also draw additional cards and, on taking vingt-un, receives double stakes from all who stand, except those who also have 21, with whom it is a drawn game. When any opponent has 21, but the dealer does not, the dealer pays double stakes. If no-one has 21, the dealer pays a single stake to those whose score is higher than the dealer's and receives a single stake from those whose score is lower. Any player with the same score as the dealer neither pays nor receives a stake. If the dealer exceeds 21, the dealer pays all who have not 'thrown up' their cards.

The first player in rotational order who declares a natural vingt-un takes over as the next dealer and earns a double stake from all players except those who also have one, who need not pay anything. The new dealer reshuffles the pack and deals afresh. Otherwise, the cards must be dealt out in succession, the pone (youngest hand) collecting the cards that have been played and shuffling them until the pack is exhausted, whereupon the same dealer re-deals.

=== Vingt-un (1850) ===
By 1850, the rules had been elaborated as follows:

The deal rotates clockwise every time a natural vingt-un occurs. The custom that the player holding the natural vingt-un takes over the deal is an "old mode of play" that many still adhered to. If the natural vingt-un occurs in the first round, the dealer is allowed a misericorde (reprieve) and retains the deal.

After the dealer has dealt the first card each, face down, each player places a stake on it; it may be as low as a single counter. (Note: It is not entirely clear whether the players may look at their first card and place a stake of their choosing up to a certain limit, or whether they all place a fixed stake on the face down card.) At this point, the dealer looks at the dealer's card and may announce "double", which doubles all the stakes, before distributed the second card to each player and, lastly, to self.

The dealer now looks at their own cards. If there is a natural vingt-un, the dealer declares it and collects double stakes. Otherwise the dealer proceeds as before, inviting players to stand or call for more cards, one by one. A player exceeding 21 is said to be 'overdrawn'. When the dealer has gone around everyone else, the dealer's own cards are turned face up and he or she may stand or add further cards as well. Those scoring the same or less, pay the dealer their stake; those scoring more receive the same amount as their stake from the dealer and those who have a vingt-un receive double. If by drawing, exactly 21 is scored, the dealer receives double stakes, excepting any ties and those who have already thrown up. If 21 is exceeded, the dealer pays all who stand, paying any vingt-uns double. (Note: Note that ties do not 'stand off' as in the 1800 rules, unless the player has a vingt-un.)

If a player has a natural vingt-un but the dealer does not, the player does not, as in the 1800 rules, receive a double stake from each player, but only settles with the dealer.

Pairs and Triplets. If a player or the dealer turns up a pair, e.g. two Kings, that person may 'go on both' and play them as separate hands. Likewise if the 3rd card is of the same rank, three hands may be played.

Brulet. After the cards have been cut, the dealer may look for the brulet i.e., a natural vingt-un formed by the top and bottom cards of the pack. These cards are thrown out and mixed with those collected by the poney. Brulet clears the board of stakes (one or two counters levied on each player at the start of the game) or takes the amount of the limit (e.g. 6d) from each player, as agreed. (Note: This appears to conflict with the earlier rule that stakes are laid after the first card has been dealt, but would suggest that stakes were fixed.)

=== Pontoon (1939) ===
The following rules for vingt-et-un (pontoon) are based on Phillips and Westall (1939).

The player who draws the highest card becomes the first dealer and is known as the Banker. The game is played for stakes: money, counters or matches.

After the first card is dealt, players look at their cards before placing a stake of their choosing up to an agreed limit. Again, the dealer may double the stakes after looking at their card. Any player who has a Natural on receiving a second card, declares it immediately, exposes the cards and, unless the dealer also has a Natural, is paid treble and takes the Bank for the next deal. If more than one player has a Natural, the one nearest the dealer's left takes it.

Player are now asked whether they wish to 'buy' or 'twist' any more cards. Players may buy cards by giving as many counters for them as they like (e.g. "buy one for two"), up to their original stake; the card is then passed to them face down. Players may ask for a twisted card ("twist me one"), which is passed face upwards. After twisting, a player cannot subsequently buy a card. Once satisfied with their cards, players announce "stand". A player who exceeds 21 is 'busted' and must declare the same.

Players who are busted, pay their stake to the dealer. If the dealer has a Natural, the dealer receives single stakes from any player who has a Natural, double stakes from any player who has 21 or "five and under" and treble stakes from the others. If the dealer has 12 or "five and under", a single stake is claimed from any player who has the same, and double stakes from the rest. Otherwise the dealer pays double to anyone with 21 or "five and under" and single stakes to any player whose total is better. The dealer receives single stakes from anyone who scores less than him. A player with the same score also has to pay.

Pairs may be played as two separate hands by announcing "split", but the brulet is not known. The Bank does not pass on a split Natural.

=== Pontoon (2011) ===
The rules of modern pontoon vary widely. Those below are based on a description by Arnold of the standard rules. All is as in the 1939 rules except as follows.

The first player to draw a Jack becomes the dealer or banker. Players place stakes of any value between the agreed lower and upper limits after looking at their first card. The banker may not look at their own cards or double the stakes. Any player who holds a pontoon (Ace and 10-point card) on being dealt a second card, declares it immediately and places it on the table.

As before, the banker then asks each player in turn what they wish to do: stand or 'stick', buy or twist. A player may not stand on a score of lower than 16. A player may buy up to 5 cards, which beats everything except a pontoon. A player may not buy a fifth card unless already holding at least 12 points, but may, however, twist. Players do not pay for twisted cards, but may not buy after having twisted. Players who have busted lose their stake and pass their cards to the banker who places them face down under the pack. Players do not show their cards during this process. Players may only split if they have two (or more) Aces.

Having gone around all the players, the banker now exposes their two cards. If they make a pontoon, the dealer claims all remaining stakes, even from players with a pontoon themselves. Otherwise the dealer may stand or deal himself more cards, but may not split. If the dealer has a five-card hand, this beats all other hands except a pontoon. The banker wins all ties. If busted, the dealer pays all those still in the game. A player with a pontoon is paid double, unless it is part of a split hand. The banker is not paid double for a pontoon.

A player who beats the banker with a pontoon, may take over the deal if desired. If two or more players have a pontoon, positional priority applies.

== Related games ==
- Blackjack or black jack is the American descendant of British vingt-un.
- Vingt-un or vingt-et-un is the French ancestor of the group.
- Siebzehn und Vier is the German variant.
- Trente et un or trente-un is an older game played to 31 points.
- Onze et demi is a French game played to 11½ points.
- Sette e mezzo is a similar Italian game played with 40 cards.
- Quinze is an old French game played to 15 points.

== Literature ==
- Arnold, Peter (2011). Chambers Card Games (2nd ed.). London: Chambers Harrap. ISBN 978-0550-10179-2.
- Bohn, Henry G. (1850). The Hand-Book of Games. London: Harrison.
- Grupp, Claus (1976). Glücksspiele mit Kugel, Würfel und Karten, Wiesbaden: Falken Verlag.
- Jones, Charles (1800). Hoyle's Games Improved (New, considerably enlarged, rev. & corrected ed.). London: Ritchie.
- Morehead, Albert H., Richard L. Frey and Geoffrey Mott-Smith (1991). The New Complete Hoyle Revised, New York.
- Morehead, Albert H. and Geoffrey Mott-Smith (1983). Hoyle's Rules of Games 2nd revised edition. A Signet Book.
- Parlett, David (1992). The Oxford Dictionary of Card Games, Oxford.
- Parlett, David (1990), The Oxford Guide to card Games: a Historical Survey, Oxford University Press, ISBN 978-0-19-214165-1
- Parlett, David (2008). The Penguin Book of Card Games. London: Penguin. ISBN 978-0-141-03787-5.
- Phillips, Hubert; Westall, B.C. (1939). The Complete Book of Card Games. London: Witherby.
- "Trumps" (1870). Cassino, Vingt-Un, Brag, and All-Fours. London: Milner and Sowerby.
- Waddingtons (April 1981). National Playing Card Survey. Leeds: Waddingtons Playing Card Co.
