= Macao (card game) =

European gambling card game

Macao is an old, European gambling card game played with French playing cards that is related to Baccarat. It was first mentioned in 1774, and may have originated in Hungary or Italy. It was described as being popular with the soldiers of the Austro-Hungarian Empire during the 19th century, although the game was later banned as a game of chance.

== Overview ==
Macao may be a forerunner of Baccarat. It is a gambling game using cards that resembles others of its genre such as Onze et Demi, Vingt Un, Trente Un or Siebzehn und Vier. The idea of Macao is also used in a dice game of the same name.

== Play ==
The following rules are from Meyer:

Each punter is dealt a card by the banker; additional cards may be 'bought'. The Ace counts as one point, Tens and court cards as nought, and the remaining cards count their pip value. The aim is to acquire nine points or as close as possible to nine points, in one's hand cards as quickly as possible.

If a player's first card is a Nine, this is a großer Schlag and wins double, unless the banker also has a großer Schlag in which case the banker collects a double stake from all players except for the punter who also had a nine, who just loses a single stake. An Eight as first card is called a kleiner Schlag.

Whoever goes bust (verkauft), i.e. ends up with more than nine points, immediately loses his stake. If the banker goes bust, all players win if they have nine or fewer points. If a player has more points than the banker, he wins a single stake; if he has fewer, he loses his stake. If a player has the same number of points as the banker, the number of cards is the decider. Whoever has fewer cards wins; if both points and cards are the same, the banker always wins.

== Differences between Macao and Baccarat ==
In Macao a player may 'buy' as many cards as possible; but if he exceeds nine points, he loses immediately. In some variants of Baccarat the player may only draw one card. If a player exceeds nine points in Baccarat only the one place counts, i.e. a player can get worse by buying, but exceeding nine points does not necessarily mean the loss of the game.

In Macao all the punters receive cards; in Baccara chemin de fer, however, only one punter gets a card and in Baccara banque only two punters (one in each half of the table).

== Literary reception ==
In Arthur Schnitzler's novella, Spiel im Morgengrauen, the game is named "Bakkarat" at one point, but it is clear from the clues in the novella that it is in fact the game of Macao.

It is mentioned in The Virginians by William Makepeace Thackeray, spelled macco.

== Literature ==
- Lentner, Joseph Friedrich (1855). Der Plattebner und seine Kinder (in German). Stuttgart: Adolf Bonz.
- Perles, M. (1891). Zentralblatt für die Juristische Praxis. Vol. 8.
- Schnitzler, Arthur (1927). Spiel im Morgengrauen: Novelle (in German). S. Fischer.
- Zollinger, Manfred (1997). Geschichte des Glücksspiels. Wien Köln Weimar: Böhlau. ISBN 978-32059-8518-1.
