= Table skittles =

Tabletop dexterity game

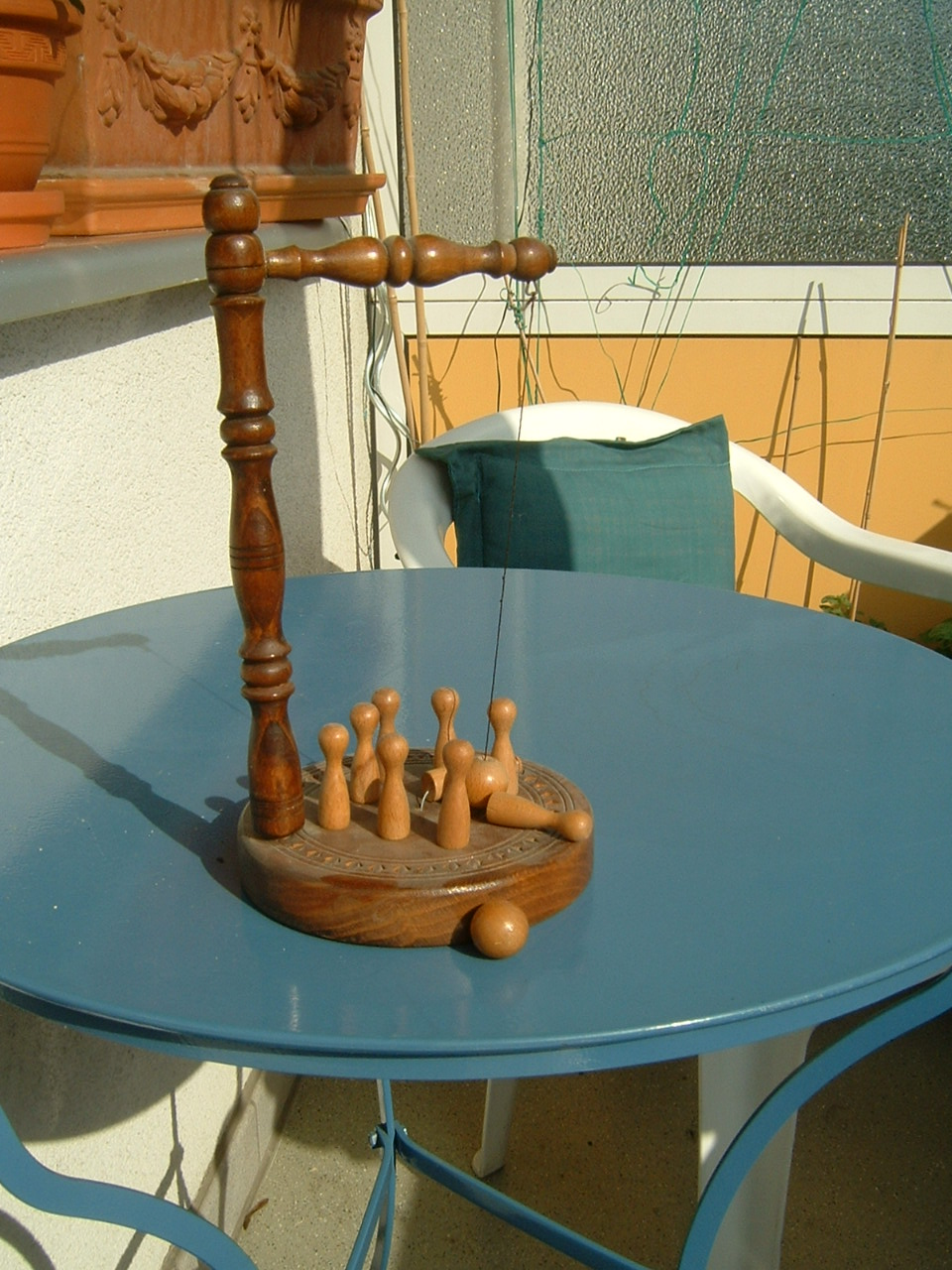
A set of pieces for the English pub game "Devil Among the Tailors"

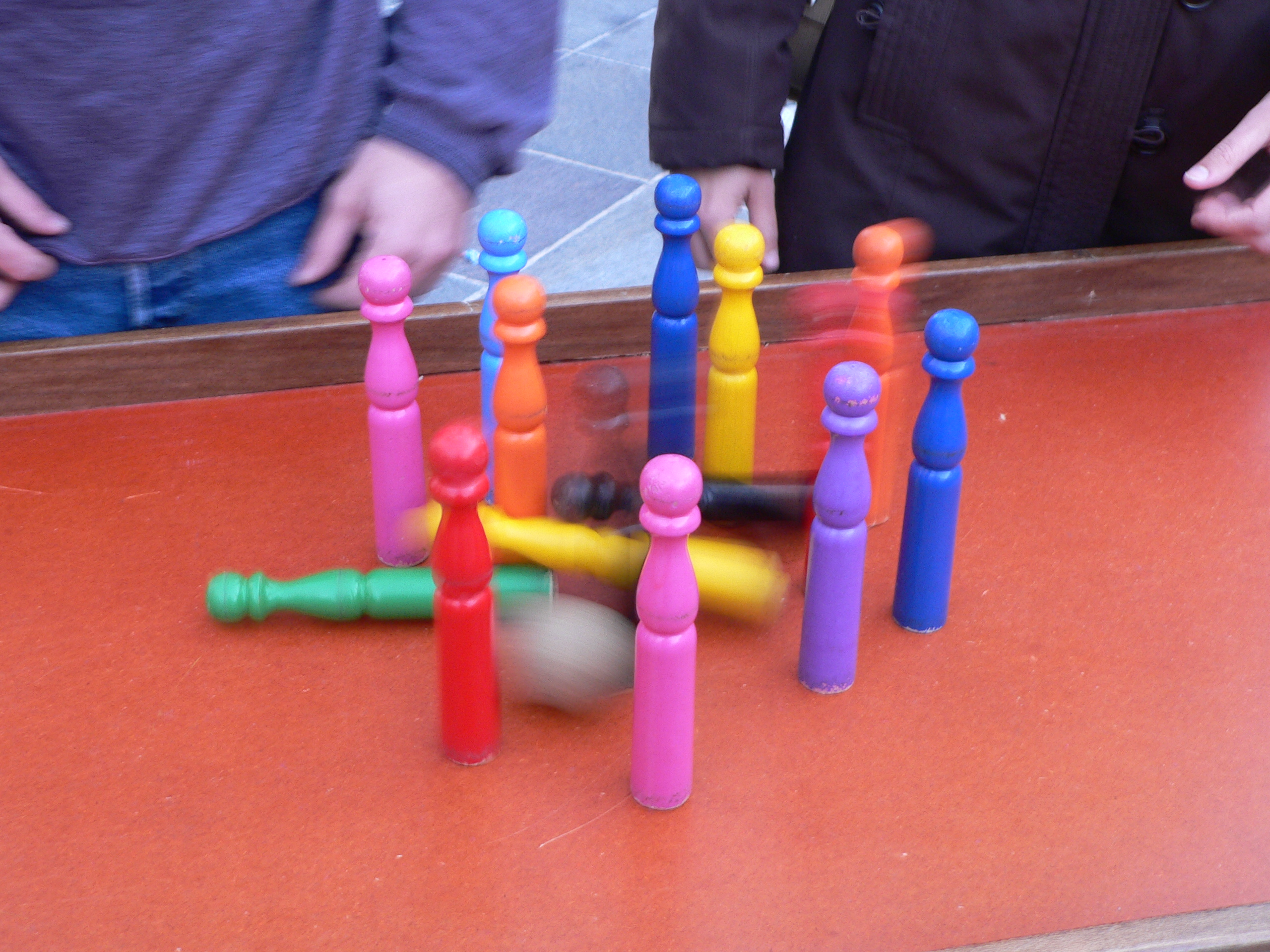
Children's table skittles

Table skittles is a game in which a ball or spinning top is used to knock over skittles on a small board, usually placed on a table. Table skittles are almost always made of wood.

Table skittles are often a small scale imitation of normal skittles (e.g. in terms of the size of lanes, skittles, balls), and like minigolf, some are considered a children's version of it. There are different regional versions of the game, including "Devil Among the Tailors" in England and Tischkegel in Austria.

== Devil Among the Tailors ==
Devil Among the Tailors is a traditional English pub game dating from the 18th century. A simple table skittles game, it has a string with a small skittle ball attached to a gallows-like post. When the ball is struck it swings in a circle or back and forth. A player's score is based on the skittles knocked over in each turn. In some games, the fallen skittles are returned to their original position by hand; in others, the skittles are attached to strings and returned to their positions by a mechanism that pulls them.

== Hood skittles ==
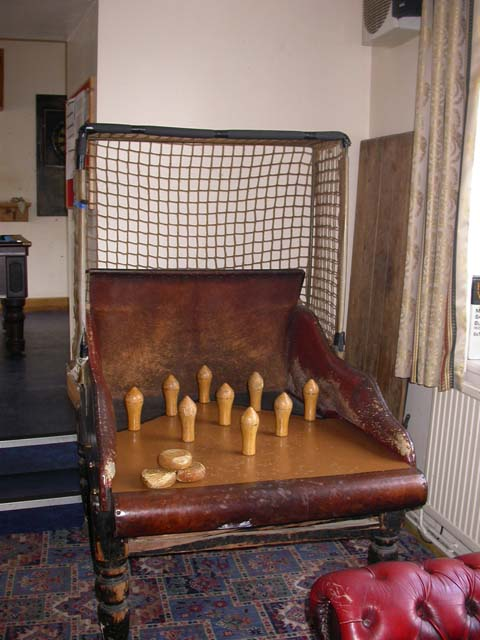
Hood skittles

In the English Midlands, specifically Northamptonshire, Bedfordshire, Buckinghamshire, Leicestershire and east Warwickshire, nine skittles are placed on a hooded table, hence the name "hood skittles". The hood skittles table is leather bound, and has leather-cushioned rails to the sides and the back, with a curved hood of leather or netting stretched up from the rear like a pram, approximately a metre over the bed of the table. Behind the area where the skittles are laid out in a diamond is a lower surface or trough. The table playing surface stands about 1 metre high and the thrower about 3 metres from the front of the table when in a pub around Leicester or Rugby, or about 3.3 metres when playing in Northamptonshire or Buckinghamshire. The player throws oblate "cheeses" rather than spherical balls, similar to those used in the game of bowls.

The skittles are about 15 cm high, circular at the bottom but widening higher up then tapering to a shallow point, which leaves them slightly top heavy. Traditionally the skittles and the cheeses are made of English boxwood. The cheeses measure about 10 cm across, and 4 cm high, one and a half inches high.

A player's turn consists of three throws, with the skittles set up in a diamond pattern. If all nine are toppled, either in a single throw or as a combination of the first two throws, they are reset and the player uses their remaining cheeses to continue knocking them down. One point is scored for each skittle toppled. If the player topples all nine on each of the first two throws, the skittles are reset again for the third throw, allowing a potential maximum score of 27 points on a single turn.

It is permitted for the players to bounce the cheese off the cushioned side walls and in some places bouncing the cheese off the rear wall is also permitted. In most versions, the toppled skittles are left where they lie while the player continues to throw the rest of their cheeses, though in some areas in Leicestershire and Rutland players remove dead skittles before each new throw. Once the player has thrown all three cheeses his total is noted and the skittles are all set up afresh for the next player.

The area around the table where one or two members of the opposition stand in order to manage the table (i.e., standing up skittles once three throws have been made or removing dead skittles) is known as the woodyard.

== Tyrolean and Merano table skittles ==
This sport is particularly well known in Bavaria (Mering), Tyrol (Tyrolean table skittles), South Tyrol (Merano table skittles) and Upper Austria, but also in Baden-Württemberg (Wolfach).

=== Construction ===
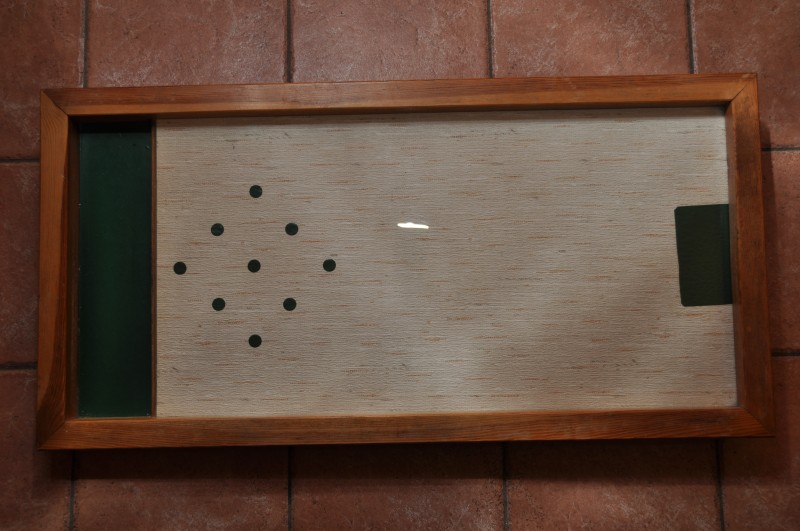
The table skittle alley

The table skittles alley consists of a sloping, framed playing surface, the table skittles board. This is usually placed on a waist-high table. The game is played with a wooden spinning top, which is used to try to knock down as many of the nine wooden pins as possible.

The dimensions of the board are 82 cm x 41 cm. The frame is 3 cm wide. The actual playing area is 67 × 35 cm. Seen from the player in the direction of the bowling, the lane is inclined about 1° downwards, from left to right the lane is inclined about 4°. That is, the spinning top usually moves in semi-circular sweeps toward the higher right-hand side. The skittles are about 6 cm apart from one another. The skittle layout forms a square, at 45° to the sides of the board, with a side length of 12 cm. These values differ regionally.

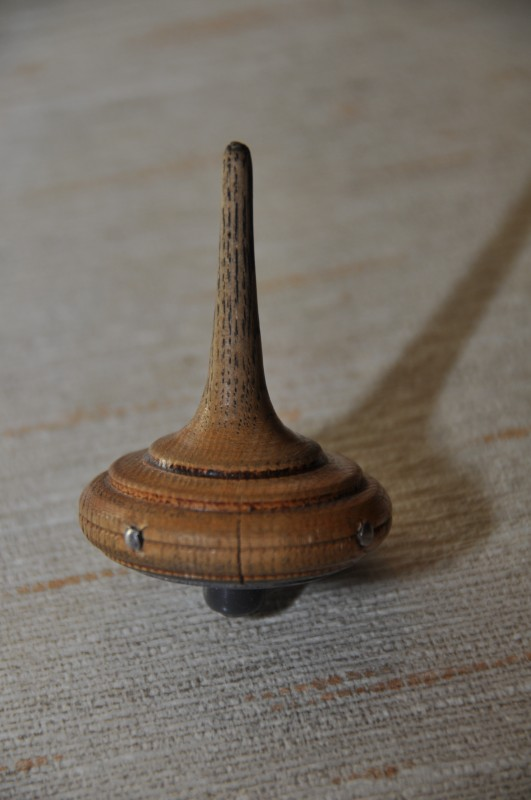
The spinning top

The track is often made of larch or other hardwood. In order to achieve a visually appealing surface, it may be covered with paper, for example. A glass plate is mounted on top. There is a zone marking the position of the top when starting it spinning. If you start outside this zone, the spin is invalid. At the other end are the skittles, whose position is marked by 9 dots for setting up. At the far end is a depression where the fallen skittles land (although they often remain on the playing surface).

=== Top and skittles ===
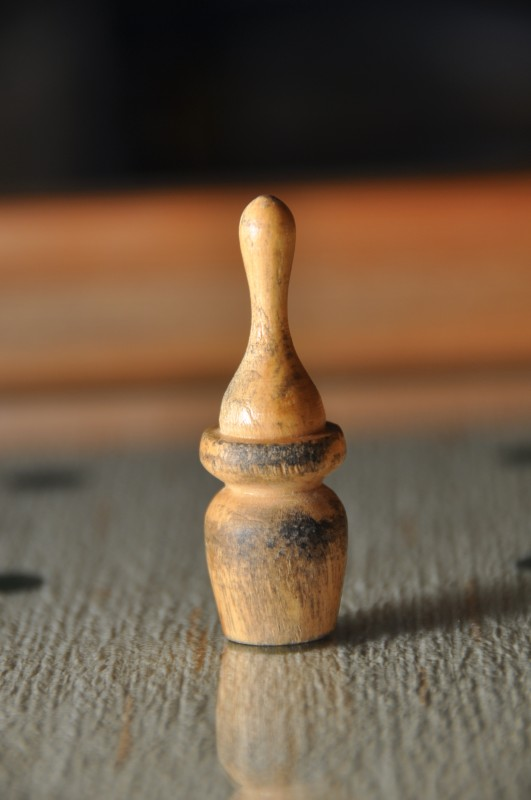
A skittle

The spinning top is made of wood and is usually 6 cm high and 4 cm wide at the bottom of the bulge. The top is weighted with lead to keep the centre of gravity low. In order to achieve better top properties, it is also reinforced horizontally with 4 nails on each side. The top should not be wider than the spacing of the cones (about 6 cm).

A skittle is also about 6 cm high and about 2.3 cm wide at the widest point.

=== Game ===
The player stands at the front of the table and usually holds the top between thumb and forefinger to spin it. The top then moves in semi-circular arcs or straight towards the cones. Even if the top passes through, the spin is counted.

Variants include:

- Merano table skittles
- Verflixte9
- Damischer Hansl

== Upper Austrian table skittles ==
In the region of southern Upper Austria table skittles is called Drauln. The word is derived from the dialect word for circling, turning (Draul). The game used to be called Pumwoilfaln. Drauln is an entertaining game in which skill and luck often play a part. Depending on how the top is spun, a distinction is made between a 'curved spin' (Bogenschub) and a classic 'straight spin' (Geradenschub).

=== Scoring ===
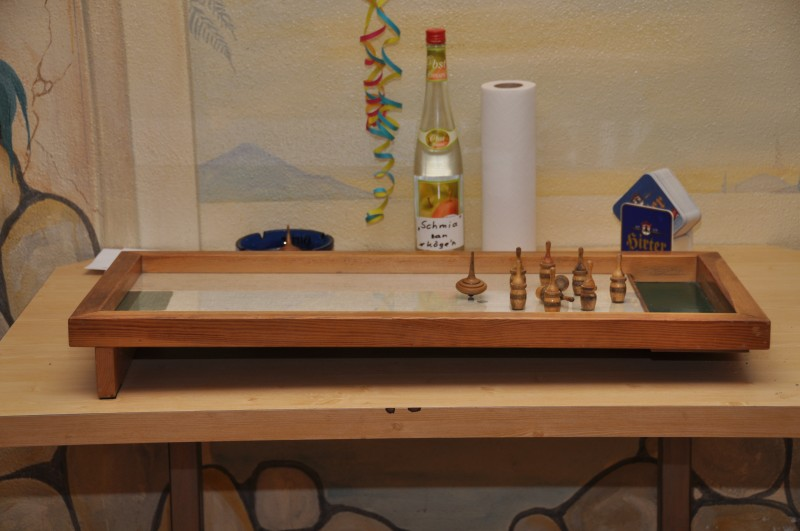
A spin in table skittles

Scoring is the same as in full size skittles. The foremost pin doubles the number of points. If three are hit in a row, they count as nine. If all the skittles fall, it is a 'sow' (Sau) and scores 36 points. If only the innermost one remains, it is a 'little wreath' (Kranzl) and scores 24 points.

=== Variants ===
- Schanzeln: Three spins per player, points are added.
- Abräumen ("sweeping off"): Three spins, with no repositioning between spins. If there is a tie for most, there is a playoff. The next round begins with fresh stakes and all players (not just those who came first) can play again. This goes on until there is a winner.

=== Tournaments ===
Tournaments are held regularly and runs as follows: there is a Stand in which 5 spins may be played (with or without money). The points are added up. Three trial spins are allowed before each new game. If the player likes the trial spin, he can count this as the first game and waive the rest. The three best Stands are added up. The winner is one with the most points over three best Stands. A special feature is the writing down (owischreibe). If you are playing a Stand and have made a particularly good spin, you can abandon the current Stand and start the new Stand with this spin.

=== Cleaning the alley ===
Since some players spin using ashes or chalk to achieve a better grip, for example with wet fingers, the track repeatedly gets dirty. It track is usually cleaned with schnaps (Obstler). You can also use window cleaner, with the disadvantage that the alley sometimes becomes too slick or slippery. The track is then usually cleaned with kitchen roll.

== Garmisch table skittles ==
A regional variation in the area around Garmisch-Partenkirchen (known locally as Werdenfelser Land) is what is known here as Stoßbuddeln (or Stossbuddeln). Using a cue stick the player hits a ball in order to hit as many of the nine pins on a miniature bowling alley as possible.

The first table of this kind was probably the one made around 1940 in a coffee house in Switzerland. This even has a manual resetting facility.
