= Quinze =

17th century gambling game

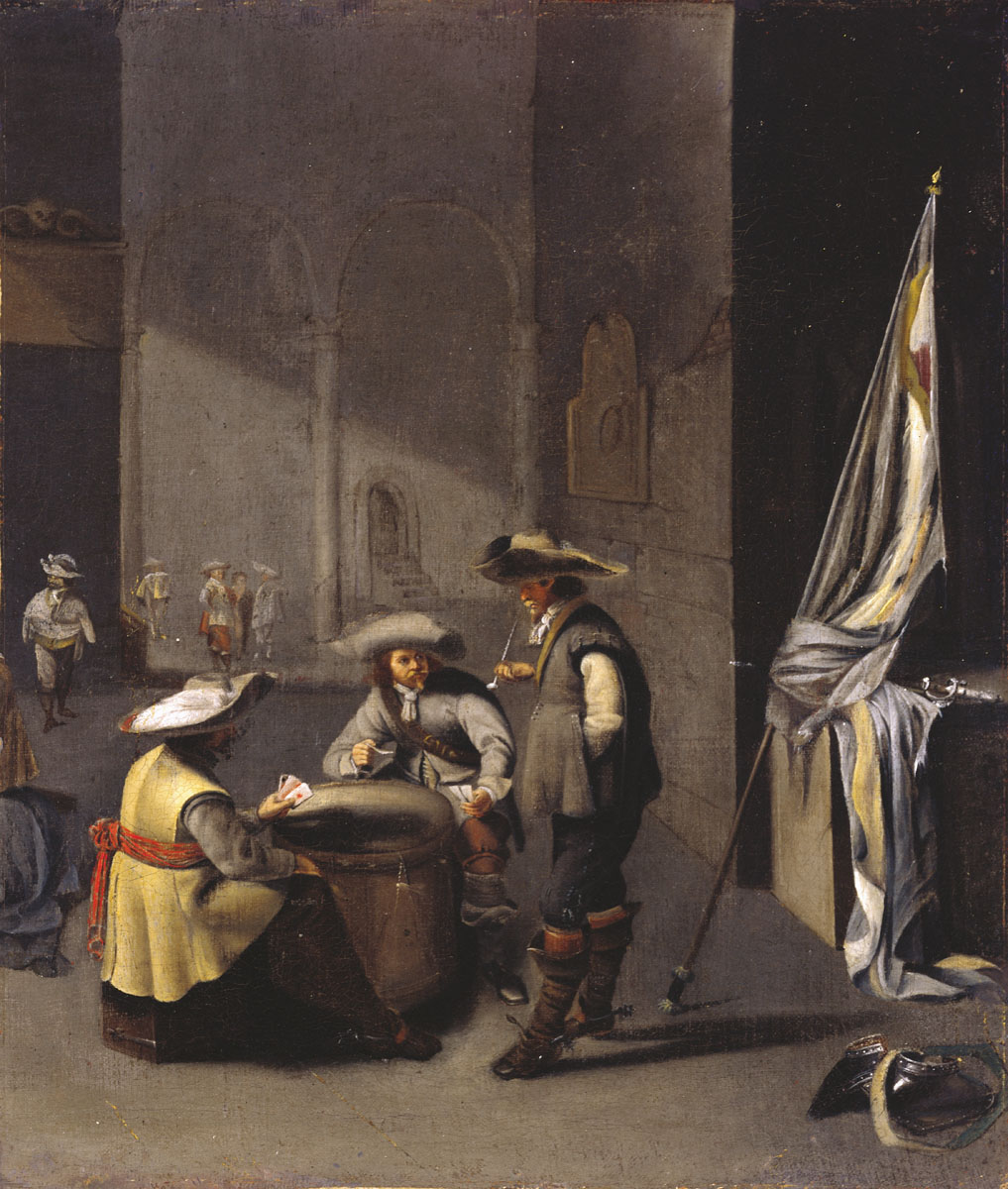
- Origin: Spain
- Family: Gambling
- Players: 2-6
- Skills: Bluffing
- Cards: 40
- Deck: Spanish
- Play: Clockwise
- Playing time: 25 min.
- Chance: Easy

Related games
- Ferme • Vingt-et-un

Quinze or quince, also known as ace-low, is a 17th-century French banking game of Spanish origin that was much patronized in some parts of Europe. It is considered a forerunner of the French vingt-et-un, a game very popular at the court of Louis XV, and also a two-player simplification of the modern game of blackjack.

Francis Willughby records a game called Hannikin Canst Abide It which appears to be an English version of quinze.

== Overview ==
Quinze is generally admired for its simplicity and fairness, depending entirely upon chance, and not requiring the attention of most other games on the cards, and therefore calculated for those who love to sport upon an equal hazard. It is a card game of chance in which players compete with each other to acquire a hand of 15 points or as close to 15 as possible, hence the game is also known as fifteen. It is usually played by two persons only, with a full pack of 52 cards.

== Play ==
The cards are shuffled by both players and when they have it cut for deal, which falls to the lot of that who cuts the lowest card, being Ace low and King high, the dealer is then free to shuffle them again. When this is done, the adversary cuts them, after which the dealer gives one card to his opponent and one to himself.

Should the dealer's adversary not approve of his card, he is entitled to have as many cards given to him, one after the other, as will make fifteen, or come nearest to that number, which are usually given from the top of the pack. That is, if the player is dealt a Two and then a Five, which amounts to seven, he must continue going on in expectation of coming nearer to fifteen. If he is dealt an Eight, which will make just fifteen, he, as having the best hand, is sure of winning the game. But if he is overdealt and makes more than fifteen, he loses, unless the dealer should do the same, in which case it is a drawn game, and the players double their stakes thus going on until one of them has won the game by being exactly fifteen or by standing as closest to this.

At the conclusion of each game, the cards are put up and shuffled and the players cut again for deal, and the elder then taken on the advantage of dealing the cards.

== Variations ==
The game recorded by Willughby is for two or more players. The dealer deals one card each and begins by asking eldest hand "Hannikin canst abide it?" If eldest says yes, the dealer draws him or her another card from the bottom of the pack ("as in One and Thirtie"). This continues until eldest is satisfied or exceeds a count of 15, whereupon dealer moves to the next player and so on. When everyone has had the cards they want, those with more than 15 are out and lose. If all are out, the dealer wins automatically. Otherwise the one nearest 15 wins. If two tie, the elder wins. If the winner has exactly 15, he or she wins double. Fifteen is known as "hitter".
