= Stoßpudel =

Austrian bagatelle game

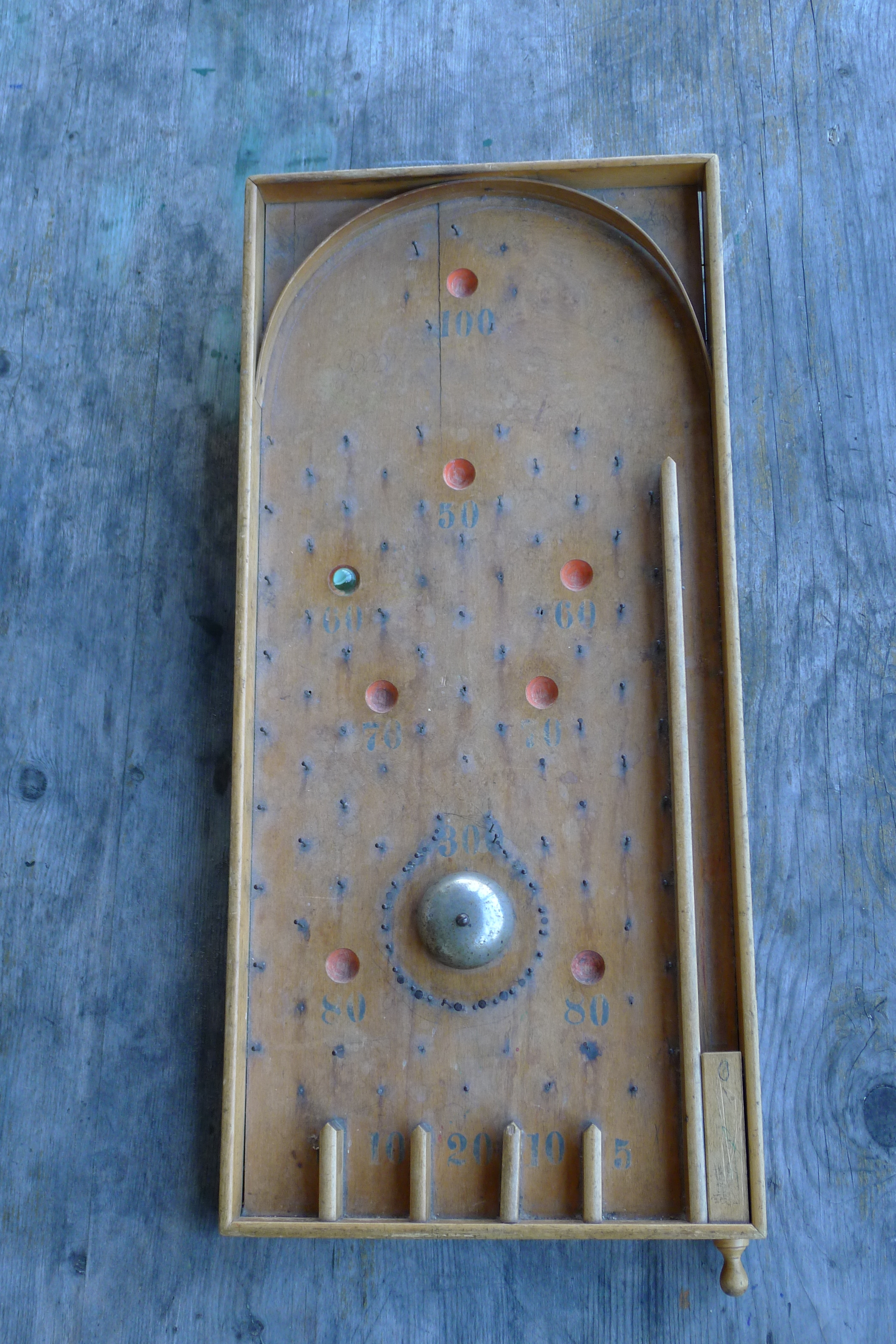
A Stoßpudel board; made c. 1920

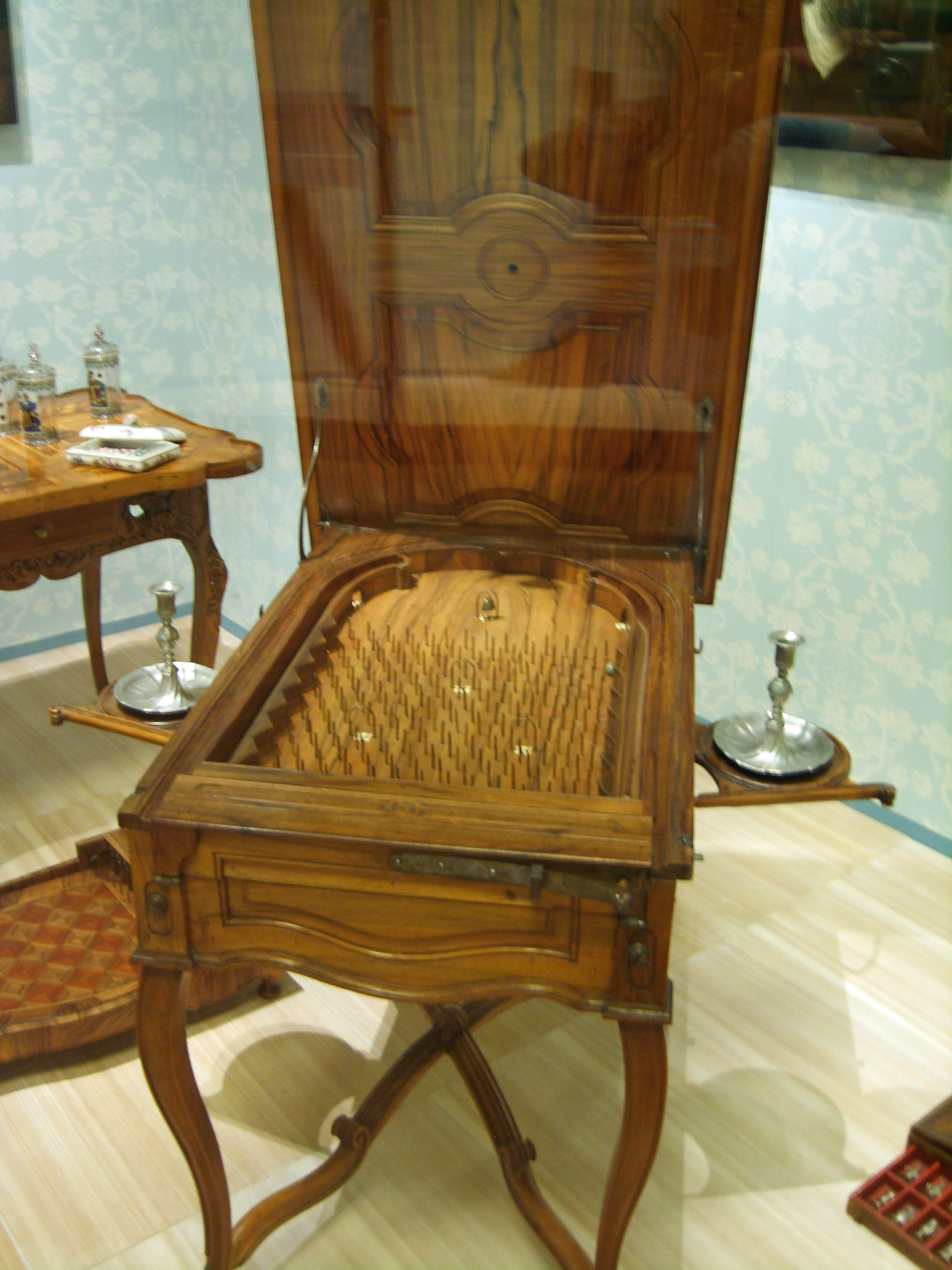
Billard Japonais, southern Germany/Alsace 1750/70

Stoßpudel is an historical, south German and Austrian pinball game in which a ball is projected onto an inclined wooden playing board and falls into hollows or rolls into demarcated slots. Various points are scored for each shot depending on where the ball ends up. An 1834 Bavarian dictionary describes a Stoßpudel as a "portable bowling alley, roughly like a type of billiard table, onto which an ivory ball is struck with a stick".

== Design ==
Stoßpudel equipment consists of an inclined and framed wooden board, in which - similar to a pinball machine - a small steel or glass ball is inserted at the bottom right and fired by means of a spring plunger. The player can regulate the force himself by pulling the spring plunger back a certain distance and thus setting the tension of the mainspring. The ball shot into the playing field now rolls down the sloping wooden surface and is deflected by small iron nails hammered at regular intervals into the wooden board. The ball can be caught in one of several small hollows or roll down the playing field and into one of the demarcated slots at the bottom. Each pit has a numerical value. The highest score is achieved when the ball rolls into the circle of nails placed in the middle of the playing field. The bell mounted in the middle of the nail circle sounds. The squares at the bottom of the playing field score significantly lower points than those in the pits.

== Play ==
By adjusting the tension of the spring plunger, the player can try to steer the ball into one of the pits or into the nail circle with its bell. That apart, the player has no influence or control of the trajectory of the ball. Pushing or lifting the game board after the ball has been fired is not permitted. The individual players take turns shooting the ball. The number of points scored for each shot is recorded. If the ball rolls back into the launch channel due to insufficient traction, the player may repeat the shot. If, after a total of three attempts, the ball is not shot into the playing field, the player scores no points and it is the next player's turn. The winner is the player who achieves the highest total number of points after a predetermined number of game rounds.

== Emergence ==
Stoßpudel is a member of the group of so-called bagatelle or pinball games, which are among the forerunners of today's pinball machines. The term "pinball" refers to a board studded with nails, on which one or more balls find their way. These games have existed since the 19th century.

Stoßpudel was one of part of the games equipment in Austrian boarding schools around 1920. This seems surprising insofar as the Stoßpudel was one of the banned games in Austria (cf. List of games prohibited in Austria-Hungary) - at that time games played for money were generally prohibited (both gambling games as well as games of skill), but the games themselves were not banned.

Stoßpudel has similarities with the Japanese game Pachinko and with Billard Japonais which, despite the name, is an old French game.
