= Schanzeln =

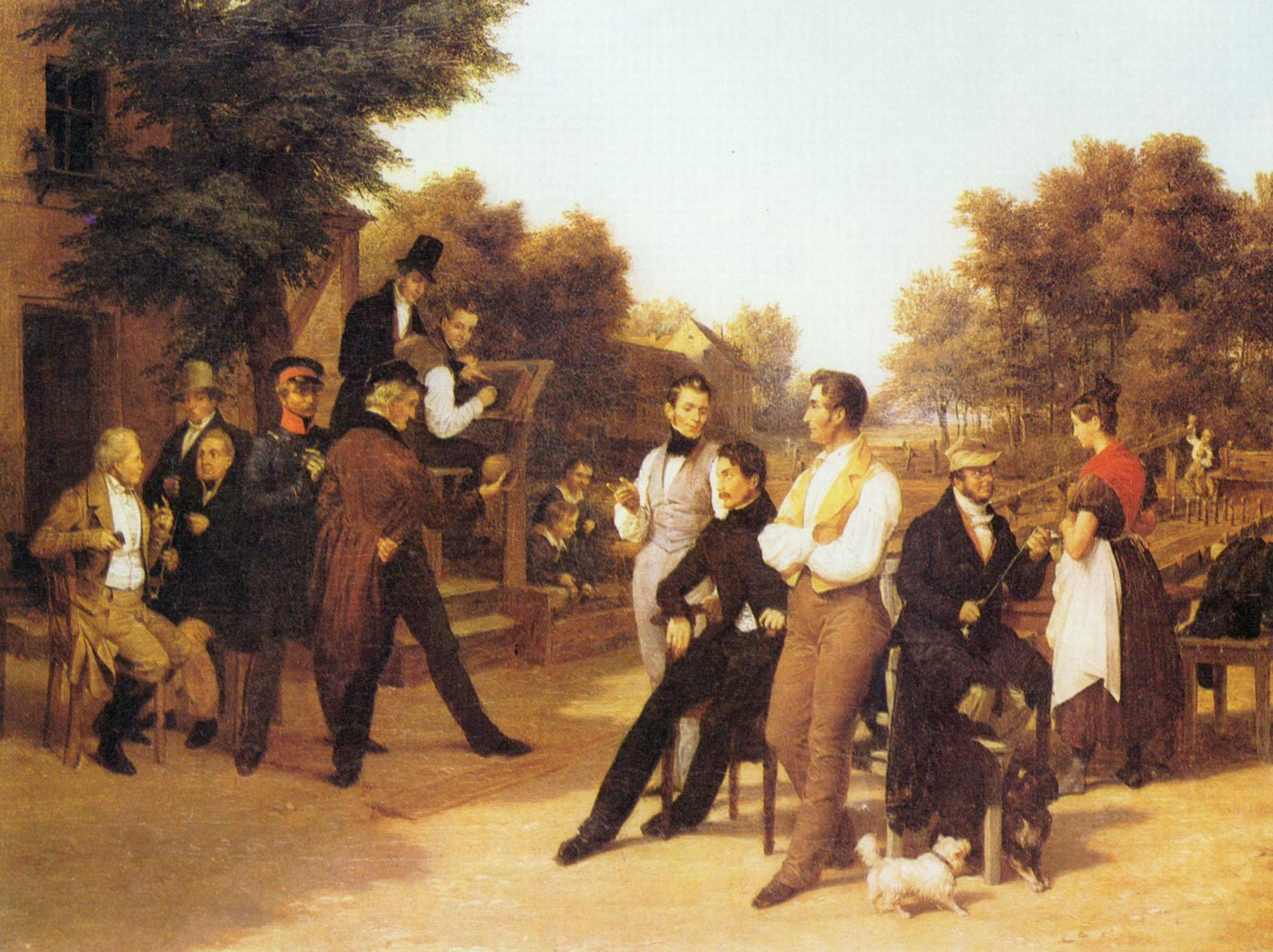
Friedrich Eduard Meyerheim: The Bowling Gamesters, 1834

Schanzeln or Schanz'ln is a variation of the European skittles game of Kegeln, at which very high wagers were often placed, which is why it ended up on the list of games prohibited in Austria-Hungary in 1904.

== Meaning ==
Schanze described the skittles game whereby all the money wagered was won by the player who knocked over the most skittles.

Schanze is derived from the French word chance. Schanzel is the diminutive form and schanzeln the verb that derives from it.

== Sources ==
- Matthias Lexer: Kärntisches Wörterbuch. Weihnacht-Spiele und Lieder aus Kärntea [sic]. 1862 (digitalised)
- Hugo Mareta: Proben eines Wörterbuchs der österreichischen Volkssprache. Zweyter Versuch. In: Jahresbericht des k.k. Ober-Gymnasiums zu den Schotten in Wien am Schlusse des Schuljahres 1865. Vienna, 1865, pp. I–XII und 1–67.
- Leopold Ziller: Was nicht im Duden steht. Ein Salzburger Mundart-Wörterbuch. 2nd edn. St. Gilgen am Wolfgangsee 1995 (EA 1979).

== See also ==
- Table skittles
