= Silesian lottery =

Game

- Kartenlotterie, Kartentombola, Großes Los, Grüne Wiese or Bullermännchen
- Origin: France
- Type: gambling
- Players: 4+
- Cards: 32 x 2
- Deck: French or German
- Playing time: 10 minutes

Silesian lottery (German: Schlesische Lotterie), also called card lottery (Kartenlotterie), card tombola (Kartentombola), Großes Los, Grüne Wiese or Bullermännchen, is a simple, German, game of chance and gambling card game, that is played with two packs of 32 Bavarian-pattern or French-suited playing cards.

The game may be played by children from 10 upwards if played with counters.

== Rules ==
The following description is based on Meyer.

=== Lots and stakes ===
Each player draws one or more, usually two, cards (Lose i.e. "lots") from the 32 cards of one pack and pays the banker the agreed price (stake) per card e.g. €1.

=== The draw ===
The banker now takes the second pack, shuffles it, offers it for cutting and then draws 9 cards from it, laying initially four pairs one beneath the other, the ninth card is the "grand lot" (Großes Los), hence one of its alternative names. In Germany, the draw is designated as a 1st to 5th class lottery draw.

=== Payment ===
For each card in the first pair the banker pays a single stake, for each card in the second pair a double stake, the third pair is worth treble and the fourth, quadruple. The grand lot pays nine times the basic stake. After each game the banker picks up the played cards and shuffles them again as part of the pack. The players may now change their cards before the next draw.

=== Bank advantage ===
If the banker sells all 32 lots at a price of 1 €, he gets 32 € in takings and has to pay out 2·1 + 2·2 + 2·3 + 2·4 + 1·9 = 29 € in winnings, i.e. the banker makes a profit (bank advantage) of €3, i. e. 9.375 % of all stakes.

== Variants ==
=== Bavaria ===
In a Bavarian variant of Silesian Lottery, instead of a fixed rate per card, each punter may choose how much to pay for his cards. Upon winning, he receives his stake times any multiplier, e.g. if he paid €1 for two cards (50¢ each) and one comes up in the 2nd pair and one in the 3rd, he wins €2.50 back. If he had paid €2 for his two cards, he would have won €5.

=== Children's variant ===
Gööck classes das Große Los as a family game, but the rules are rather different. Each player gets a number of chips (Müller - 15 chips) and a prize is agreed for winning the last card. The banker deals all the cards of one pack to the other players; it being immaterial if some have an extra card. Players lay their cards, face up, in front of them. Banker shuffles the second pack, has it cut and places it face down in front of him. One by one he turns over his top card, calling it out by name, before placing it in a wastepile next to his stock. The player with the corresponding card turns it face down. As soon as any player has turned all his cards he calls "Stop!" and tries to 'buy' a card from one the other players. Players may delay their purchases, which means that there will be competition to barter for the last few cards. They may also negotiate to share the winnings. The last card called wins the prize. With larger numbers of players, more than one prize may be agreed. (Note: Presumably for winning e.g. the penultimate card, although this is not stated.) If a player misses a call, fails to turn a card, they pay a penalty.

== Terminology ==
- Trekkaarten ("trick cards"). In Low German Kartenlotterie and similar games, the cards from which winnings are drawn.

== Literature ==
- Gööck, Roland (1967). Freude am Kartenspiel. Gütersloh: Bertelsmann.
- Grupp, Claus D. (1975). Kartenspiele. Wiesbaden: Falken-Verlag Erich Sicker. ISBN 3-8068-2001-5.
- Meyer, Klaus (1889). "Lotterie". Meyers Konversationslexikon. Leipzig: Verlag des Bibliographischen Instituts.
- Meyer, Klaus (1908). "Lotterie" in Meyers Großes Konversations-Lexikon], Vol. 12, pp. 721-725. Verlag des Bibliographischen Instituts, Leipzig.
- Müller, Reiner F. (1994). Die bekanntesten Kartenspiele. Berlin: Neff. ISBN 3-8118-5856-4.
- Reichelt, Hans (1987). Kartenspiele von Baccara bis Whist. Englisch, Wiesbaden. ISBN 3-88140-313-2, pp. 37-39.
- Sirch, Walter (2008). Vom Alten zum Zwanzger – Bayerische Kartenspiele for Kinder and Erwachsene – neu entdeckt. Bayerischer Trachtenverband.
- Schütze, Johann Friedrich (1800). Holsteinisches Idiotikon. Hamburg: Heinrich Ludwig Villaume.
