= Faro (card game) =

French gambling card game

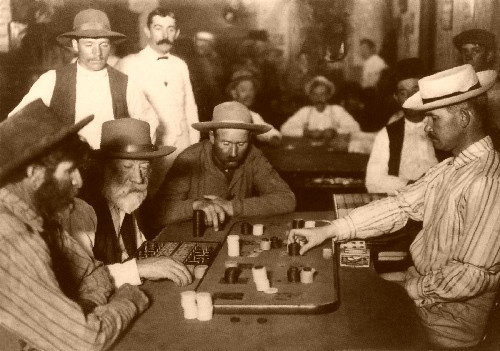
- Men playing faro in an Arizona saloon in 1895
- Origin: France
- Type: Gambling
- Skills: Counting
- Cards: 52
- Deck: Anglo-American
- Play: Clockwise
- Playing time: 10–15 minutes
- Chance: Medium

Related games
- Baccarat, basset, Tempeln, monte bank, lansquenet

Faro (/ˈfɛəroʊ/ FAIR-oh), pharaoh, pharao, or farobank is a late 17th-century French gambling game using cards. It is descended from basset, and belongs to the lansquenet and monte bank family of games due to the use of a banker and several players. Winning or losing occurs when cards turned up by the banker match those already exposed.

It is not a direct relative of poker, but faro was often just as popular due to its fast action, easy-to-learn rules, and better odds than most games of chance. The game of faro is played with only one deck of cards and admits any number of players.

Popular in North America during the 19th century, Faro was eventually overtaken by poker as the preferred card game of gamblers in the early 20th century.

Variants include German faro, Jewish faro, and ladies' faro.

== History ==
The earliest references to a card game named pharaon (French for 'pharaoh') are found in Southwestern France during the reign of Louis XIV. Basset was outlawed in 1691, and pharaoh emerged several years later as a derivative of basset, before it too was outlawed.

After the French ban, pharaoh and basset continued to be widely played in England during the 18th century, where it was known as pharo, an English alternate spelling of pharaoh. The game was easy to learn, quick, and when played honestly, the odds for a player were considered by some to be the best of all gambling games, as Gilly Williams records in a letter to George Selwyn in 1752.

With its name shortened to faro, it spread to the United States in the 19th century to become the most widespread and popularly favored gambling game. It was played in almost every gambling hall in the Old West from 1825 to 1915. Faro could be played in over 150 places in Washington, D.C. alone during the American Civil War. An 1882 study considered faro to be the most popular form of gambling, surpassing all others forms combined in terms of money wagered each year.

It was also widespread in the German states during the 19th century, where it was known as Pharao or Pharo. A simplified version played with 32 German-suited cards was known as Deutsches Pharao ('German pharo') or Süßmilch ('sweet milk'). It is recorded in card game compendia from at least 1810 to 1975. In Low German the game was also referred to as Pitje-Patje ('money' + 'small heaps').

In the US, faro was also called "bucking the tiger" or "twisting the tiger's tail", a reference to early card backs that featured a drawing of a Bengal tiger. By the mid 19th century, the tiger was so commonly associated with the game that gambling districts where faro was popular became known as "tiger town", or in the case of smaller venues, "tiger alley". Some gambling houses would simply hang a picture of a tiger in their windows to advertise that a game could be played there.

Faro's detractors regarded it as a dangerous scam that destroyed families and reduced men to poverty because of rampant rigging of the dealing box. Crooked faro equipment was so popular that many sporting-house companies began to supply gaffed dealing boxes specially designed so that the bankers could cheat their players; methods of cheating in faro are detailed below. Cheating was so prevalent that editions of Hoyle's Rules of Games began their faro section by warning readers that not a single honest faro bank could be found in the United States. Criminal prosecutions of faro were involved in the Supreme Court cases of United States v. Simms, 5 U.S. (1 Cranch) 252 (1803), and Ex parte Milburn, 34 U.S. (9 Pet.) 704 (1835).

Although the game became scarce after World War II, it continued to be played at a few Las Vegas and Reno casinos through 1985.

=== Etymology ===
Historians have suggested that the name pharaon comes from Louis XIV's royal gamblers, who chose the name from the motif that commonly adorned one of the French-made court cards.

== Rules ==
=== Description ===
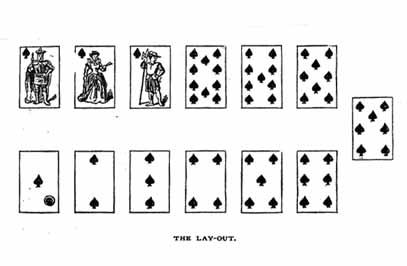
The layout of a faro board

A game of faro was often called a "faro bank". It was played with an entire deck of playing cards. One person was designated the "banker" and an indeterminate number of players, known as "punters", could be admitted. Chips (called "checks") were purchased by the punter from the banker (or house) from which the game originated. Bet values and limits were set by the house. Usual check values in the US were 50 cents to $10 each.

The faro table was typically oval, covered with green baize, and had a cutout for the banker. A board was placed on top of the table with one suit of cards (traditionally spades) pasted to it in numerical order, representing a standardized betting "layout". Each player laid his stake on one of the 13 cards on the layout. Players could place multiple bets and could bet on multiple cards simultaneously by placing their bet between cards or on specific card edges.

A player could reverse the intent of his bet by placing a hexagonal (6-sided) token called a "copper" on it. Some histories said a penny was sometimes used in place of a copper. This was known as "coppering" the bet, and reversed the meaning of the win/loss piles for that particular bet. Players also had the choice of betting on the "high card" bar located at the top of the layout.

=== Procedure ===
- A typical 52-card deck was shuffled and placed inside a "dealing box", a mechanical device also known as a "shoe", which was used to prevent manipulations of the draw by the banker and to assure players of a fair game.
- The first card in the dealing box was called the "soda" and was "burned off", leaving 51 cards in play.
- The dealer then drew two cards: the first was called the "banker's card" and was placed on the right side of the dealing box. The next card after the banker's card was called the carte anglaise (the English card) or simply the "player's card", and it was placed on the left of the shoe.
- The banker's card was the bettor's "losing card"; regardless of its suit, all bets placed on the layout's card that had the same denomination as the banker's card were lost by the players and won by the bank.
- The player's card was the "winning card". All bets placed on the card that had that denomination were returned to the players with a 1 to 1 (even money) payout by the bank (e.g., a dollar bet won a dollar). A "high card" bet won if the player's card had a higher value than the banker's card.
- The dealer settled all bets after each pair of cards were drawn. This allowed players to bet before drawing the next two cards. Bets that neither won nor lost remained on the table, or they could be picked up or changed by the player prior to the next draw.
- When only three cards remained in the dealing box, the dealer would "call the turn", which was a special type of bet that occurred at the end of each round. The object now was to predict the exact order that the three remaining cards, Bankers, Players, and the final card–called the Hock–would be drawn. The player's odds here were 5 to 1, while a successful bet paid off at 4 to 1 (or paid 1 to 1 with odds of 2 to 1 if there were a pair among the three, known as a "cat-hop"). This provided one of the dealer's few advantages in faro. If it happened that the three remaining cards were all the same, there would be no final bet, as the outcome was not in question.

Certain advantages were reserved to the banker: if they drew a doublet, that is, two equal cards, they won half of the stakes placed upon the card equal to the doublet. These and the advantage from the odds on the turn bet provided a slight financial advantage to the dealer or the house.

A device called a "casekeep" was employed to assist the players and prevent dealer cheating by counting cards. The casekeep resembled an abacus, with one spindle for each card denomination, with four counters on each spindle. As a card was played, either winning or losing, one of four counters would be moved to indicate that a card of that denomination had been played. This allowed players to plan their bets by keeping track of what cards remained available in the dealing box. The operator of the case keep is called the "casekeeper" or, colloquially in the American West, the "coffin driver".

== Cheating ==
To give themselves more of an advantage, and to counter the losses from players cheating, dealers would also often cheat. In a fair game the house's edge was low, so dealers increasingly resorted to cheating the players to increase the profitability of the game for the house. This, too, was acknowledged by Hoyle editors when describing how faro banks were opened and operated: "To justify the initial expenditure, a dealer must have some permanent advantage."

=== By dealers ===
Dealers employed several methods of cheating:

- Stacked or rigged decks: A stacked deck would consist of many paired cards, allowing the dealer to claim half of the bets on that card, as per the rules. A rigged deck would contain textured cards that allowed dealers to create paired cards in the deck while giving the illusion of thorough shuffling.
- Rigged dealing boxes: Rigged, or "gaffed", dealing boxes came in several variants. Typically, they allowed the dealer to see the next card prior to the deal, by use of a small mirror or prism visible only to the dealer. If the next card was heavily bet, the box could also allow the dealer to draw two cards in one draw, thus hiding the card that would have paid. This would result in the casekeep not accounting for the hidden card, however. If the casekeeper were employed by the house, though, he could take the blame for "accidentally" not logging that card when it was drawn.
- Sleight of hand: In concert with the rigged dealing box, the dealer could, when he knew the next card to win, surreptitiously slide a player's bet off of the winning card if it was on the dealer's side of the layout. At a hectic faro table he could often get away with this, though it was obviously a risky move.

=== By players ===
Players would routinely cheat as well. Their techniques employed distraction and sleight-of-hand, and usually involved moving their stake to a winning card, or at the very least off the losing card, without being detected. Their methods ranged from crude to creative, and worked best at a busy, fast-paced table:

- Simple move of their bet: The most basic cheat was simply to move one's bet to the adjacent card on the layout while avoiding the banker noticing. While the simplest, it also carried the greatest risk of detection.
- Moving with a thread: A silk thread or single horse hair would be affixed to the bottom check in the bet, and allowed the stack to be pulled across the table to another card on the layout. This was less risky, as the cheating player would not have to make an overt action.
- Removing the copper: A variant on the use of the thread was to affix it to the copper token used to reverse the bet. If the losing card matched the player's bet, the copper made it a winning bet and no cheat was needed. If, however, the winning card, dealt second, were to match the player's bet the copper would ordinarily make it a loser, but quickly snatching the copper from the stack with the invisible thread turned it into a winner. This held the least risk, as once the copper was yanked from the stack, there was no thread left attached to the bet.

Being caught cheating often resulted in a fight, or even gunfire.

== In culture ==
=== Etymology ===
- The old phrase "from soda to hock", meaning "from beginning to end" derives from the first and last cards dealt in a round of faro. The phrase evolved from the better known "from soup to nuts". In turn, "soda" and "hock" are probably themselves derived from "hock and soda", a popular nineteenth-century drink consisting of hock (a sweet German wine) combined with soda water.

=== Geography ===
- The town of Faro, Yukon, Canada was named after the game.

=== History ===
- The 18th-century adventurer and author Casanova was known to be a great player of faro. He mentions the game frequently in his autobiography.
- The 18th-century Prussian officer, adventurer, and author Friedrich Freiherr von der Trenck makes mention of playing faro in his memoirs (February 1726 – 25 July 1794).
- The 18th-century Dutch cavalry commander Casimir Abraham von Schlippenbach (1682–1755) also mentions the game (as Pharaon) in his memoirs. Apparently, he was able to win considerable sums of money with the game.
- The 18th century Whig radical Charles James Fox preferred faro to any other game.
- The 19th-century American con man Soapy Smith was a faro dealer. It was said that every faro table in Soapy's Tivoli Club in Denver, Colorado, in 1889 was gaffed (made to cheat).
- The 19th-century scam artist Canada Bill Jones loved the game so much that, when he was asked why he played at one game that was known to be rigged, he replied, "It's the only game in town."
- The 19th-century lawman Wyatt Earp dealt faro for a short time after arriving in Tombstone, Arizona, having acquired controlling interest in a game out of the Oriental Saloon.
- The 19th-century political boss Robert J. "Doc" Slater ran the principal gambling club in Baltimore, Maryland for 30 years primarily dealing faro bank.
- The 19th-century dentist and gambler John "Doc" Holliday dealt faro in the Bird Cage Theater as an additional source of income while living in Tombstone, Arizona.

=== In popular culture ===
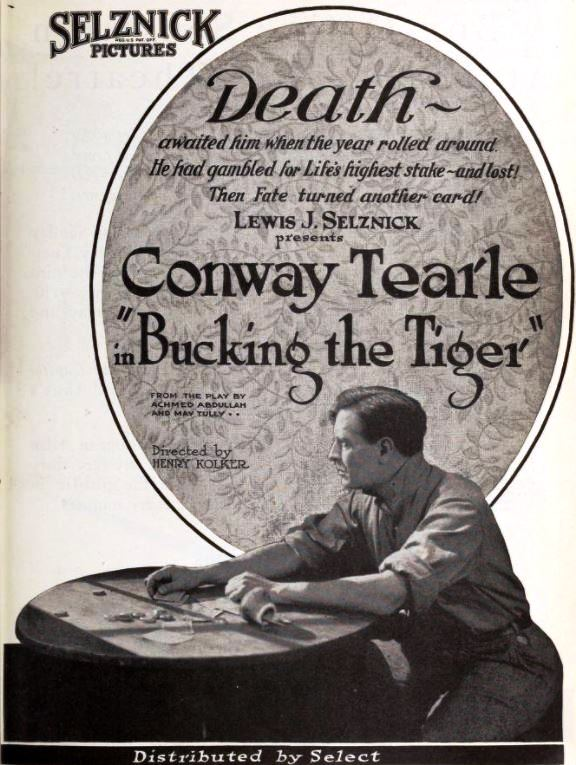
The silent film Bucking the Tiger (1921) took its name from an alternate name for Faro

Literature and its adaptations

- The well-known author of Regency romances Georgette Heyer wrote a novel entitled Faro's Daughter; it tells of a young lady forced to deal faro to support her family and her ensuing romance with one of the gaming hall's patrons.
- In Edna Ferber's novel Show Boat, the gambler Gaylord Ravenal specializes in the game of faro.
- Faro is mentioned extensively in John D. Fitzgerald's semi-autobiographical Silverlode/Adenville trilogy, which consists of the books Papa Married a Mormon, Mama's Boarding House, and Uncle Will and the Fitzgerald Curse. It is one of the primary games played at the Whitehorse Saloon, owned by the character Uncle Will. In Mama's Boarding House the character Floyd Thompson, one of the tenants in the boarding house, is a faro dealer. Faro is also occasionally mentioned in Fitzgerald's corresponding Great Brain series, which focuses on the children of Adenville.
- In Oliver La Farge's story "Spud and Cochise" (1935), the cowboy Spud plays faro when he is in a very good mood. Aware of the widespread dishonesty of American faro dealers in his time, he nevertheless bets heavily, viewing his gambling losses as a form of charity.
- In Jack London's novel White Fang, the owner of the bulldog, Tim Keenan, is a faro dealer.
- In the Giulietta act of Jacques Offenbach's opera The Tales of Hoffmann (based on three short stories by E. T. A. Hoffmann), Giulietta invites Schlemil to take his place at the table of pharaoh.
- In Jules Massenet's opera Manon, the game at the Hotel Transylvania is faro, and Guillot accuses des Grieux and Manon of cheating at it.
- Lord Ruthven in John William Polidori's "The Vampyre" plays faro in Brussels.
- The miners in Puccini's opera La fanciulla del West (The Girl of the Golden West), based on David Belasco's play The Girl of the Golden West, play a contentious game of faro in Act One.
- Faro is central to the plot of Alexander Pushkin's story "The Queen of Spades" and Tchaikovsky's opera adaptation, The Queen of Spades.
- In Wesley Stace's Misfortune, the character "Pharaoh" is named after his father's profession, a faro dealer.
- In Thackeray's novel The Luck of Barry Lyndon, the main character runs a crooked faro bank, alternatively to his great fortune or ruin. In its film adaptation, Barry Lyndon, one of the famous candlelit scenes shows Barry and his employer cheating at faro. In the background a Moorish servant holds a casekeep showing which cards have been played.
- In a famous scene from Leo Tolstoy's book War and Peace, Nicholas Rostov loses 43,000 rubles to Dolokhov playing faro.
- In Fyodor Dostoevsky's novel "The Brothers Karamazov", Dmitri Karamazov is cheated out of 200 rubles by two Polish officers in a game of faro when they switch an unopened deck of cards for a marked set.
- In Oakley Hall's Western novel Warlock (Hall novel), loosely based on historical events in the town of Tombstone, Arizona, Clay Blaisedell (inspired by Wyatt Earp), deals faro at Tom Morgan's gambling hall in stints between his duty as Warlock's marshal.

Games

- In the video game Assassin's Creed Unity (2014), the main character Arno Dorian, in the early stages of the game, plays a game of faro with a blacksmith but loses after the blacksmith cheats. Arno loses his deceased father's pocket watch and breaks into the blacksmith's house to steal it back.

Radio and motion pictures

- In the HBO TV series Deadwood, Al Swearengen mentions Faro, rather than poker, is played in his Gem Saloon, and the game is referred to frequently throughout the series.
- Numerous references to Faro are made in both the Western radio drama Gunsmoke, starring William Conrad, and the television drama Gunsmoke starring James Arness.
- Tombstone Territory, The Lady Gambler (S1, E33) aired May 28, 1958, and featured Diane Brewster (Beaver Cleaver's teacher in season one) as a newly hired Faro dealer. The game is shown in brief, yet good detail including some esoteric rules (a 'Cat hop' and that the man's bet was 'coppered' ). Peter Breck shows up to gamble there, years before The Big Valley.
- The Magnus Archives episode "Cheating Death" (2016) centers around a soldier in the American Revolutionary War who rigs a game of Faro.
- The Murdoch Mysteries episode "Staircase to Heaven" involves a murder during a game of Faro.
- In the American western The Shootist (1976), Jack Pulford (Hugh O'Brian) is a professional gambler and a faro dealer at the Metropole Saloon.
- When planning The Sting (1973) on New York gangster Doyle Lonnegan (Robert Shaw), one of the conmen researching their mark mentions that he "only goes out to play faro", making him a hard target for the big con.
- In the film Tombstone (1993), Wyatt Earp, played by Kurt Russell, becomes a faro dealer after arriving in Tombstone.
- In the Australian TV series Harrow, the episode "Alea lacta est" features a murder plot centered around the fictional Brisbane Faro Society.

== See also ==
- Cassino (card game)
- Commerce (card game)
- Phat (card game)
- Va banque
