= Va banque =

Gambling term meaning to go "all in" risking everything for the win

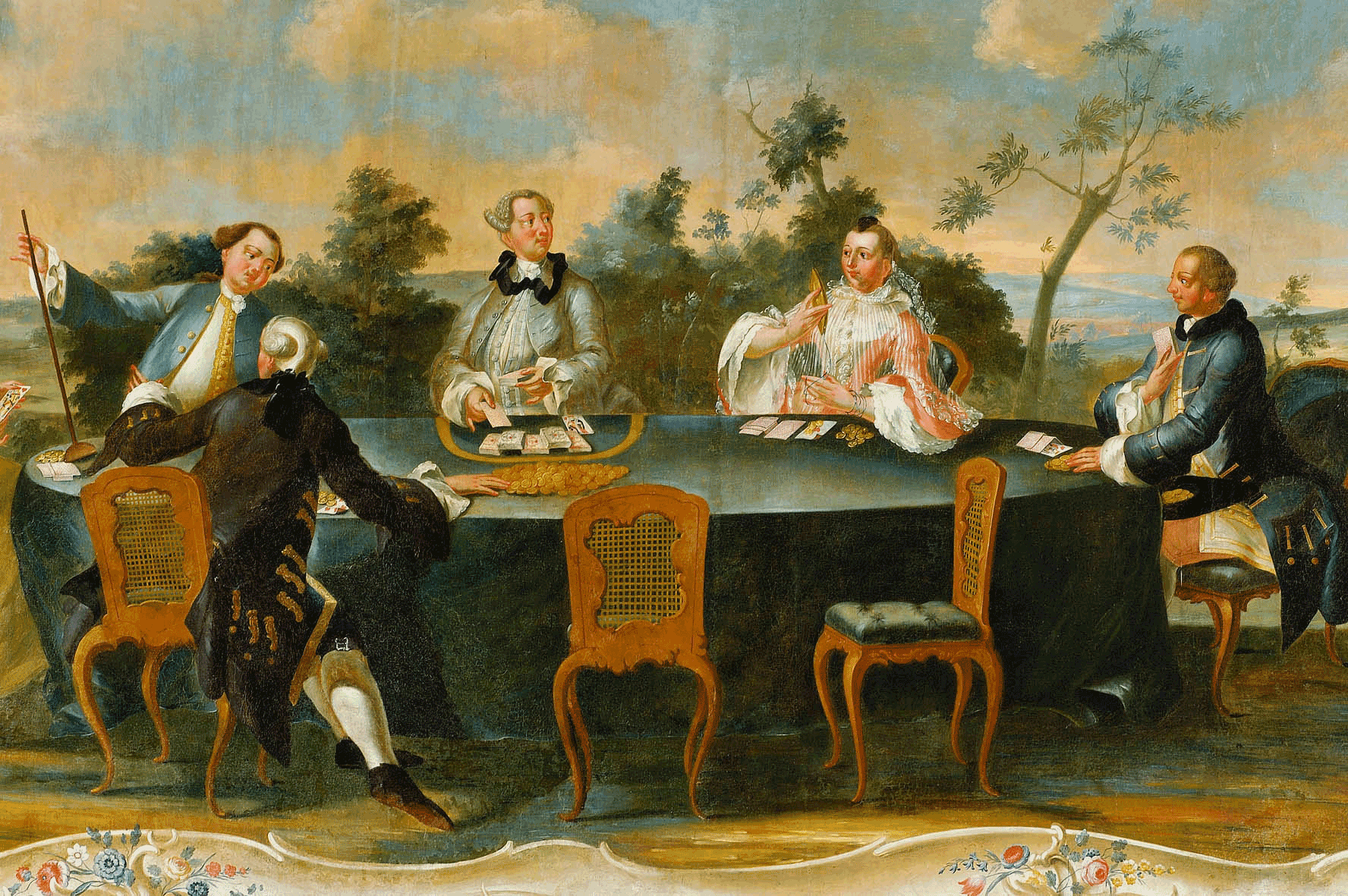
A game of Faro in the 18th century

Va banque or Vabanque is a gambling term from the card game of Pharo or Faro, which was popular in the 18th and 19th century. It is similar to the decision to "go bank" (or "banco") in chemin de fer, a form of baccarat. It means that a player bets equal to the current amount of money in the game's "bank". Vabanque is generally a risky choice in that the player puts everything at stake, he is "all in", and can lose everything, or gain an equal amount.

Va banque became a particularly noted expression due to its uses in a reported dialogue between Adolf Hitler and Hermann Göring as the Polish crisis reached its peak before World War II. Göring urged Hitler not to go too far with his gamble of playing off the English against the Poles, to which Hitler replied that throughout his life he had always played vabanque.

The term was also used in normal card games like Bavarian Tarock when a player risked everything on the play of one card.

In Poland, the term may also refer to the local franchise of Jeopardy!, which uses the name as its title. The term "Va Banque" is used in a Daily Double (better known in English as a true Daily Double) or occasionally written "VB" in the Final Jeopardy! round for his wager in that round.

== Literature ==
- _ (1881). Ausführliche Anleitung zum Deutschtarokspielen nebst einem Anhange, enthaltend: ein Verzeichniß über alle technischen oder Kunstausdrücke, Provinzialismen und vulgären Bezeichnungen, welche bei diesem Spiele vorkommen. Munich: Cäsar Fritsch.
