= Onze et demie =

German card game

Onze et demie ('eleven and a half'), also onze et demi, is an historical German banking game for any number of players and a close relative of vingt et un.

Despite its name, the game only appears in Austrian and German card game compendia. It is first recorded on 1821 and it appears to have become obsolescent in the second half of the 20th century, its last rules being published in 1967. It is sometimes called Elfeinhalb or Halbzwölf, both of which also mean 'eleven and a half'. Hoffmann misspells it "once et demie".

Any number may play. Before the deal, players stake whatever they like. The banker then deals each player one card each and players may then buy as many cards as they like from the banker until they decide to stop. The aim of the game is to score as close to 11½ as possible. For scoring purposes, the Ace is worth 11, court cards ½ and pip cards their face value. Anyone who has a court and buys an Ace has a natural onze et demie and is paid double. The banker collects the stakes of those who lose and pays from the bank those who win. The banker wins in the event of a tie and wins double stakes from all the punters if he himself has onze et demie, except that where a punter also has onze et demie, that punter pays nothing.

== Bibliography ==
- Das neue königliche l'hombre, nebst einer gründlichen Anweisung ... von Piquet, Reversy ... nebst noch andere Kartenspielen, und das Billard- Pielkentafel- Schach- und Ballspiel, wie auch das Verkehren im Brett, Triktrak und Tokkategli (in German). Lüneburg: Herold & Wahlstab. 1821.
- Gööck, Roland (1967). Freude am Kartenspiel (in German). Gütersloh: Bertelsmann.
- Hoffmann, Peter Friedrich Ludwig (1873). Der Meister in allen Kartenspielen eine praktische Anleitung zur schnellen Erlernung aller beliebten Kartenspiele (in German). Hamburg: Berendischer. OCLC 249282866.
- Hahn, Alban von (1893). Buch der Spiele : Encyklopädie sämtlicher bekannten Spiele und Unterhaltungsweisen ... (in German) (4 ed.). Leipzig: Otto Spamer. OCLC 312220995.
