= Tempeln =

Gambling card games

- Meine Tante, deine Tante; Naschi Waschi; Stoß, Süßmilch
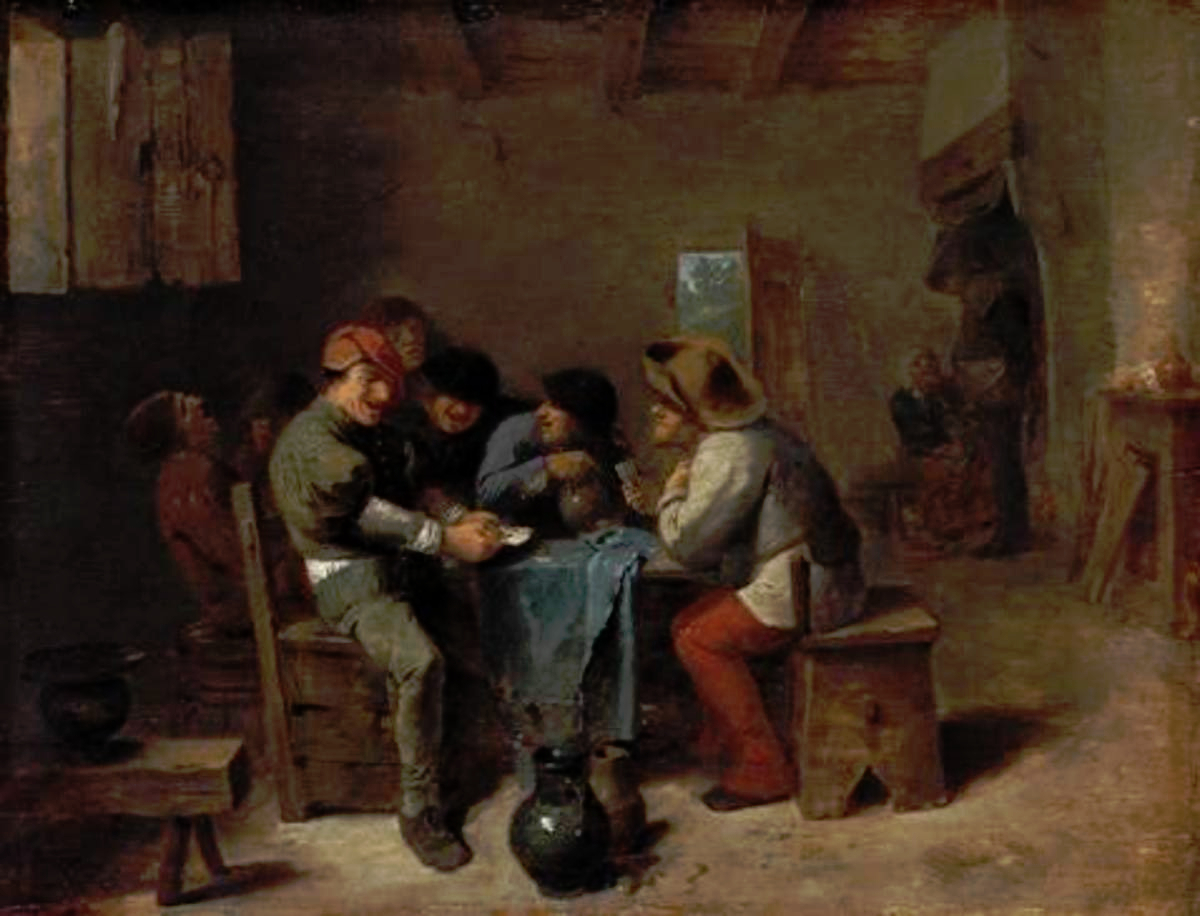
- Adriaen Brouwer: Card players with kibitzers (c. 1630 painting)
- Origin: France
- Type: gambling
- Family: Banking
- Cards: 32 or 52
- Deck: French, Piquet or Skat

Related games
- Basset, Faro, Lansquenet, Monte Bank

Tempeln, also known as Meine Tante – Deine Tante, and its 32-card version, known as Naschi Waschi, German Pharaoh, Stoß or Süßmilch, are very simple historical, German, gambling card games played with French or German playing cards. They differ from the more complex Basset and Faro in that they omit aspects such as lappé, paroli, etc.

== Names ==
The names Tempeln and Meine Tante – Deine Tante refer to the 52-card game, the latter name being more prevalent today.

In Austria-Hungary, where the game was played with a 32-card Piquet pack or William Tell pack, it was called Naschi Waschi, a name derived from the Czech, naši – vaši, i.e. "Ours - Yours". The 32-card game played with German-suited cards in the rest of the German Empire was referred to as Süßmilch ("Sweet Milk") or Deutsches Pharao ("German Pharaoh").

== Layout ==
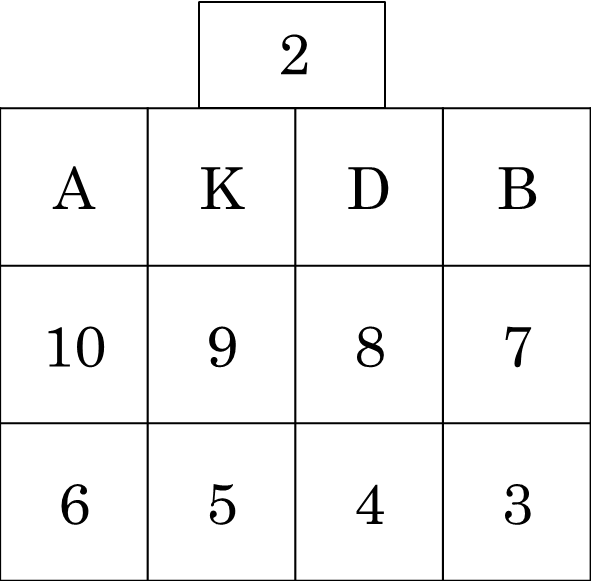
Typical layout for playing Tempeln

A temple-like shape (hence the name) is usually chalked on the table to form a betting layout with as many 'fields' as there are different cards. For example, if Whist cards are used, thirteen fields are needed (for the Two to Ace); if Piquet cards are used, only 8 fields are needed, laid out in two rows of four.

Instead of chalking the layout on the table, one of the four suits of cards from a second pack of cards may be used; these may be mounted on a sheet of card to prevent them sliding about.

== Playing ==
The following rules are based on Hoffmann. The punter lay stakes on the fields representing the cards they hope will come up. They may place their stakes in the middle of a field, on the line dividing two fields if they want to bet on either, or at the intersection of four fields.

The banker then draws two cards as in Faro placing the first to the left and the second to the right. The bank wins stakes corresponding to the left-hand card; the punters win the equivalent of their stake on cards from the right-hand side. If the two cards are of the same rank, the banker wins half the money staked on the corresponding field.

After the payments are settled, the banker pauses before drawing two more cards in order to allow players to increase or decrease their bets or to remove or add further bets to the table.

The lowest card does not score for the punters; the advantage to the banker is thus greater in the 32-card game (German Pharaoh or Süßmilch) than in the 52-card game (Tempeln or Meine Tante...).

Alternative betting layout for the 32-card game using e.g. beer mats.

 A----K    O----U
 |    |    |    |
 7----8    9---10

== Sources ==
- Brockhaus, F.A. (1894). Brockhaus Konversationslexikon
- Hoffmann, Peter Friedrich Ludwig (1874). Der Meister in allen Kartenspielen eine praktische Anleitung zur schnellen Erlernung aller beliebten Kartenspiele (in German). Hamburg: Berendischer. OCLC 249282866.
- Meyer, Joseph (1909), Meyers Großes Konversationslexikon, Vol. 19, Leipzig.
- Ulmann, Siegmund (1890). Das Buch der Familienspiele : Sammlung der am meisten in Uebung stehenden Ball-, Fang-, Lauf-, Wurf-, Kegel-, Kugel-, Brett-, Vexier-, Gesellschafts-, Karten- und Würfel-Spiele; mit Angabe ihrer Usancen und Gesetze, zahlreichen Illustrationen und erläuternden Beispielen (in German). Wien: Hartleben. OCLC 246788062.
