= Twenty-one (card game) =

Card game

- The ancestor of blackjack and pontoon
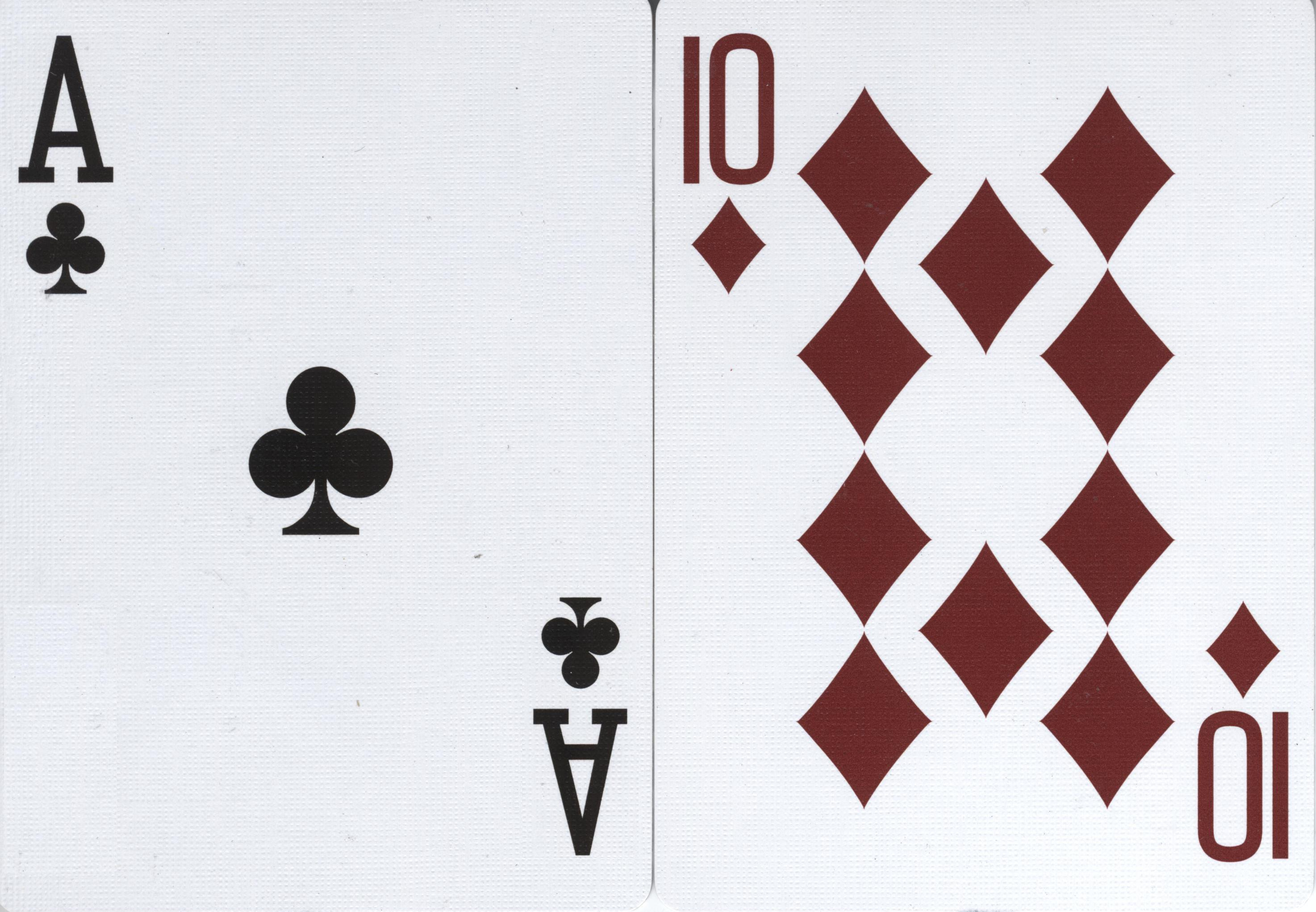
- An ace and ten scoring twenty-one
- Origin: Probably Spain; popularized in France
- Alternative names: Vingt-un, vingt-et-un, Siebzehn und Vier, Einundzwanzig
- Type: Comparing
- Players: Usually 3–7
- Skills: Probability
- Cards: 32 or 52
- Deck: French or German
- Play: Clockwise or anti-clockwise
- Chance: High

Related games
- Blackjack • Pontoon

Twenty-one, formerly known as vingt-un in Britain, France and America, is a family of popular card games of the gambling family, the progenitor of which is recorded in Spain in the early 17th century. The family includes the casino games of blackjack and pontoon as well as their domestic equivalents. Twenty-one rose to prominence in France in the 18th century and spread from there to Germany and Britain from whence it crossed to America. Known initially as vingt-un in all those countries, it developed into pontoon in Britain after the First World War and blackjack in Canada and the United States in the late 19th century, where the legalisation of gambling increased its popularity.

== History ==
=== Spanish origins ===
The game is first mentioned by name in a 1611 Spanish dictionary where, under the entry for "card" (carta), it mentions the game of veinte y uno ("twenty-one"). Just two years later, the first brief description of the game is given in a novella by Spanish author Miguel de Cervantes, most famous for writing Don Quixote. Cervantes was a gambler, and the main characters of his tale "Rinconete y Cortadillo", from Novelas Ejemplares, are a couple of cheats working in Seville. They are proficient at cheating at veintiuna (sic), and state that the object of the game is to reach 21 points without going over and that the ace scores 1 or 11. The game is played with the Spanish baraja deck. This short story was written between 1601 and 1602, implying that ventiuna had been played in Castile since the beginning of the 17th century or earlier. (Note: Parlett states that vingt-un first emerged in the mid-18th century as a descendant of trente-un ("thirty-one"), the latter first being recorded as early as 1464. He argues that it was probably introduced because players could reach 21 faster than 31 - even in two cards - and thus the rate of play and consequent payouts were speeded up. However, this theory has since been debunked by Depaulis.)

=== France ===
The first record of the game in France occurs in 1768 in the Mercure de France, which describes vingt-un as fashionable, but "very old", referring to Cervantes' novella. Other early accounts indicate that the game was new to France suggesting that it took root there from the mid-18th century. It was also played at the court of Louis XV and is reputed to have been the favourite card game of Napoleon, but no French rules appear until 1817, nearly two decades after their publication in England. The game continues to appear in French compendia as vingt-un and, later, vingt-et-un until the late 19th century, but appears obsolete today.

=== Britain ===
In Britain, the game is also recorded in the 1770s and 1780s, for example in a comedy entitled Dissipation, but the first rules appear in the 1800 edition of Hoyle's under the name of vingt-un. The rules, which are rather simple, are reprinted almost verbatim for the next half a century, but in 1850, more elaborate rules are described which are beginning to look like pontoon in all but name.

=== Germany ===
Known in the German-speaking world as Siebzehn und Vier ("seventeen and four"), Einundzwanzig ("twenty-one"), Hop(p)sen, Hoppm, Rathen or, frequently, by its original French names of vingt-un or vingt-et-un, the game had spread to Prussia and the Austro-Hungarian Empire there by the second half of the 18th century, and had become a universally common game of chance by 1854. It has continued to be popular as a children's and family game through to modern times.

=== North America ===
There is a popular myth that, when vingt-un was introduced into the United States in the early 1800s – other sources say during the First World War and still others the 1930s – gambling houses offered bonus payouts to stimulate players' interest. One such bonus was a ten-to-one payout if the player's hand consisted of the ace of spades and a black jack (either the jack of clubs or the jack of spades). This hand was called a "blackjack", and it is claimed that the name stuck to the game even though the ten-to-one bonus was soon withdrawn. French card historian Thierry Depaulis has recently debunked this story, showing that the name blackjack was first given to the game by prospectors during the Klondike Gold Rush (1896–99), the bonus being the usual ace and any 10-point card. Since the term "blackjack" also refers to the mineral zincblende, which was often associated with gold or silver deposits, he suggests that the name was transferred by prospectors to the top bonus in the game. He was unable to find any historical evidence for a special bonus for having the combination of an ace with a black jack.

== General mode of play ==
Whilst there are numerous variants of twenty-one, the following general rules apply. The game has a banker and a variable number of punters. The role of banker rotates around the players, except for casino games where the banker's role is held permanently by a member of the casino staff. The banker deals two cards, face down, to each punter. Bets are placed either before receiving the cards or after receiving and viewing the first card. The punters, in turn, having picked up and examined both cards announce whether they will stay with the cards they have or receive another card from the banker free. Some games also allow a punter to raise his stake and 'buy' another card. The aim is to score exactly twenty-one points or, failing that, to come as close to twenty-one as possible, based on the card values dealt. If a player exceeds twenty-one, they lose their stake. Once every punter has either announced they will stay with their cards or exceeded twenty-one, the dealer takes his turn. Anyone who achieves twenty-one in his first two cards has a 'natural vingt-un', 'pontoon' or 'blackjack', depending on the game variant, which wins double.

== Typical rules ==
The following sections give an outline of the regional variants of twenty-one beginning with the early rules in France which are probably close to the original game.

=== British vingt-un ===
The earliest rules printed anywhere appear in Hoyle's Games Improved, published in London in 1800. The following is a summary:

The first dealer is chosen by any agreed method, e.g. the first player to turn up an ace becomes the dealer. It is likely that deal and play were clockwise and that players staked a fixed amount before the deal, but the rules are vague on these points.

The dealer deals two cards to each player, one at a time. He then asks each player, in rotation and beginning with eldest hand (to his left), whether he wants to 'stand' or choose another card. In the latter case, the dealer gives him the top card from the pack. The player may continue to ask for more cards until he reaches or exceeds a score of 21 or decides to stand. If he exceeds 21, he immediately throws his cards up and pays his stake to the dealer.

The dealer may also draw additional cards and, on taking vingt-un, receives double stakes from all who stand, except those who also have 21, with whom it is a drawn game. When any opponent has 21, but the dealer does not, the dealer pays double stakes. If no-one has 21, the dealer pays a single stake to those whose score is higher than his and receives a single stake from those whose score is lower. Any player with the same score as the dealer neither pays nor receives a stake. If the dealer exceeds 21, he pays all who have not 'thrown up' their cards.

The first player in rotational order who declares a natural vingt-un takes over as the next dealer and earns a double stake from all players except those who also have one, who need not pay anything. The new dealer reshuffles the pack and deals afresh. Otherwise, the cards must be dealt out in succession, the pone (youngest hand) collecting the cards that have been played and shuffling them until the pack is exhausted, whereupon the same dealer re-deals.

=== French vingt-un ===
The game was originally called vingt-un in France, later becoming known as vingt-et-un. The following rules are based on the Petite Académie des Jeux (1817), supplemented by Raisson (1835).

The game is played with a French-suited pack of 52 cards. Cards are worth their nominal value except for the ace which scores 1 or 11 points at the player's discretion and court cards which are worth ten points each. The first banker or banquier is chosen by lot. Punters (joueurs) place their stakes; usually a maximum is agreed.

The banquier shuffles the cards, offers them to his left for cutting and then deals two to each player, one at a time. In turn each player may say "I'll keep them" (je m'y tiens) or "card" (carte) depending on the strength of his cards. Once a player sticks (i.e. keeps his cards) or goes bust, it is the turn of the next player in anti-clockwise order.

A punter who busts gives the banker his stake and puts his cards to one side. If the banquier goes bust, he pays each surviving player the amount of their stake. If he sticks, the cards are laid down. The banquier pays any punter with a higher score the amount of his stake and receives the stakes of those punters who have a lower score. If the scores are level; the punter just 'pays' in his cards (i.e. hands his cards in).

If a punter scores twenty-one straight away (i.e. with an ace and a ten or an ace and a court card) it is a vingt-un d'emblée ("immediate twenty-one"). He reveals his cards and is paid double his stake by the banquier without waiting for the end of the round unless the banquier also has twenty-one in which case no money changes hands. If the banquier scores twenty-one straight away, each punter pays him double his stake unless he, too, has twenty-one in which case he simply 'pays' in his cards.

Once the cards are all dealt, the round is over. If there are not enough cards left to go round, the banquier distributes those he has and then shuffles those already used up and deals the additional cards necessary to finish the round.

=== American vingt-un ===
Twenty-one appeared in the United States in the early 1800s, still known in those days as vingt-un. The first rules were published in 1825 and were effectively a reprint of those from the 1800 English Hoyle (see above). English vingt-un later developed into an American variant in its own right which, during the Klondike Gold Rush (1896–99) became known as blackjack (see below). Blackjack has since become an international casino game but remains popular as a home game.

=== Siebzehn und Vier ===
The German variant of twenty-one is known as Siebzehn und Vier ("seventeen and four"), Einundzwanzig ("twenty-one") or Hoppsen, although many sources describe it under its French names. The first rules appeared in 1821 under the name vingt un. The following rules are based on Ulmann (1890).

One or two packs of piquet cards or German-suited cards are used (32 in each) ranking from ace or deuce down to seven. Card values are: ace/deuce - 11, ten - 10, king - 2, queen and jack - 1, nine - 9, eight - 8 and seven - 7. The banker (banquier or bankhalter) places a fixed or variable stake, shuffles the cards well and has one of the punters or pointeurs cut them. He then deals just one card to each pointeur, face down, and takes one himself. The one on the right of the banquier now 'buys' a card and either 'stays put' (bleibt) or takes another card, again deciding whether to stick or buy. If he goes 'bust' he is 'dead' (todt) and immediately pays his stake to the bank and throws his cards in, face down. The next pointeur now takes his turn and so on until all the pointeurs have either stuck or bust. Now the banquier looks at his card, buys another one and goes through the same process until he sticks or busts.

A pointeur who scores twenty-one in his first two cards is paid double his stake. Two aces count as twenty-one for this purpose. Pointeurs who score the same or less than the banquier pay their stake to the bank. If the banquier scores twenty-one he wins double stakes from each pointeur unless the latter also has twenty-one in which case he only pays a single stake. If the banquier scores twenty-one in his first two cards, he receives a double stake from everyone else regardless of their scores.

== Descendants ==
=== Pontoon ===
Pontoon is the British variant of twenty-one. The name dates back to the First World War and is probably a corruption of 'vontoon', which in turn derived from vingt-un, but the game is clearly much older. For example the rules by "Trumps" (1870) for vingt-un in a British card game manual already reflect the more elaborate rules of what later became known as Pontoon.

=== Blackjack ===
Although the modern game of blackjack has no fixed rules, it has clearly developed in sophistication from twenty-one. In addition to different terminology and payment systems, there are other nuances, such as splitting pairs, insurance and doubling down which add to the skill of the game.

== Literature ==
- _. (1817). Petite académie des jeux. Marchands de Nouveautés, Paris.
- _. (1821). Das neue königliche L'Hombre. 16th improved edn. Lüneburg: Herold and Wahlstab.
- _. (1825). Hoyle’s Games Improved. George Long, New York.
- Depaulis, Thierry (2010). "Dawson’s Game: Blackjack and the Klondike," in The Playing-Card, Journal of the International Playing-Card Society, Vol. 38, No. 4, ed. by Peter Endebrock, April–June 2010, 317 pages. Published by The International Playing-Card Society, ISSN 0305-2133.
- Fontbona, Marc (2008). Historia del Juego en España. De la Hispania romana a nuestros días. Barcelona: Flor del Viento Ediciones. ISBN 978-84-96495-30-2.
- Jones, Charles (1800). Hoyle’s Games Improved. New, considerably enlarged, revised and corrected edn. London: Ritchie.
- Krünitz, J. G. (1854). Oekonomisch-technologische Encyklopädie, oder allgemeines System der Staats- Stadt- Haus- und Landwirthschaft und der Kunstgeschichte, Vol. 224: Viehzucht - Vinificator. Pauli, Berlin.
- Parlett, David (1990). A History of Card Games, OUP, Oxford. ISBN 0-19-282905-X
- Parlett, David (2008). The Penguin Book of Card Games, Penguin, London. ISBN 978-0-141-03787-5
- Raisson, Horace Napoléon (1835). Académie des jeux: cotenant la manière de jouer les principaux jeux de cartes et de combinaison, Edme et Alexandre Picard, Paris.
- Scarne, John (1986). Scarne's new complete guide to gambling (Fully rev., expanded, updated ed.). Simon & Schuster. ISBN 978-0671630638.
- Ulmann, S. (1890). Das Buch der Familienspiele. A. Hartleben, Vienna, Munich and Pest.
- von Schönfeld, Johann Ferdinand Edlen. (1782). Der Kinderfreund: Ein Wochenblatt. Drey und zwanzigster Theil, Part 23, 2nd edn. Prague.
- "Trumps" (1870). Cassino, Vingt-Un, Brag, and All-Fours. Milner and Sowerby, London.
