= Borthwick (surname) =

Borthwick is a surname of Scottish origin. Notable people with the surname include:

- Alastair Borthwick (1913–2003), Scottish author and broadcaster
- Algernon Borthwick, 1st Baron Glenesk (1830–1908), British politician
- David Borthwick (born 1950), Australian public servant
- Emily Borthwick (born 1997), British high jumper
- Gabrielle Borthwick (1866–1952), pioneering motorist and mechanic
- Jack Borthwick (Australian footballer) (1884–1948), Australian footballer
- Jack Borthwick (footballer, born 1886) (1886–1942), Scottish football player
- Jamie Borthwick (born 1994), English actor
- Jessica Borthwick (1888–1946), British filmmaker and sculptor
- John Borthwick (disambiguation)
- John Borthwick (footballer) (born 1964), English footballer
- John Borthwick (veterinary surgeon) (1867–1936), veterinary surgeon in the Cape Colony, South Africa
- Sir John Thomas Borthwick, 3rd Baronet (1917–2002) of the Borthwick baronets
- John Borthwick, 5th Lord Borthwick (died 1566)
- John Borthwick, 8th Lord Borthwick (died 1623)
- John Borthwick, 9th Lord Borthwick (1616–1675) (dormant 1675)
- John David Borthwick (1824–1892), Scottish journalist and author
- John Henry Stuart Borthwick, 23rd Lord Borthwick (1905–1996) (confirmed in title 1986)
- John Hugh Borthwick, 24th Lord Borthwick (1940–2025)
- Mamah Borthwick (1869–1914), American translator
- Mark Borthwick, British photographer
- Peter Borthwick (1804–1852), British politician and newspaper editor
- Ruth Borthwick, chair of English PEN
- Scott Borthwick (born 1990), English cricketer
- Steve Borthwick (born 1979), English rugby player
- Walter Borthwick (1948–2021), Scottish football player and manager

== William Borthwick ==
- William Borthwick, 1st Lord Borthwick (died 1458), Scottish peer and ambassador
- William Borthwick, 2nd Lord Borthwick (died 1483), Scottish ambassador to England
- William Borthwick, 3rd Lord Borthwick (died 1503), Scottish nobleman and ambassador
- William Borthwick, 4th Lord Borthwick (died 1542), Scottish nobleman
- William Jason Maxwell Borthwick (1910–1998), British Royal Navy officer
- William Borthwick (mayor) (1848–1928), mayor of Ottawa, 1895–1896
- Bill Borthwick (1924–2001), Australian politician
