= Borthwick (disambiguation) =

Borthwick is a hamlet in Scotland.

Borthwick may also refer to:

== People ==
- Borthwick (surname)
- Borthwick baronets
- Clan Borthwick, a Scottish clan
- Lord Borthwick, a title in the Peerage of Scotland

== Places ==
- Borthwick Castle, Midlothian, Scotland
- Borthwick Park, a small park in the Adelaide suburb of Kensington, South Australia
- Borthwick Water, a river in Scotland

== Other uses ==
- Borthwick Institute for Archives, at the University of York
- MV Borthwick, the name of two ships

== See also ==
- Borthwickia, a genus of flowering plants
- Borwick (surname)
