= John Borthwick =

John Borthwick may refer to:

- John Borthwick (footballer) (born 1964), English footballer
- John Borthwick (veterinary surgeon) (1867–1936), veterinary surgeon in the Cape Colony, South Africa
- John David Borthwick (1824–1892), Scottish journalist and author
- Sir John Thomas Borthwick, 3rd Baronet (1917–2002) of the Borthwick baronets
- John Borthwick, 5th Lord Borthwick (died 1566)
- John Borthwick, 8th Lord Borthwick (died 1623)
- John Borthwick, 9th Lord Borthwick (1616–1675) (dormant 1675)
- John Henry Stuart Borthwick, 23rd Lord Borthwick (1905–1996) (confirmed in title 1986)
- John Hugh Borthwick, 24th Lord Borthwick (born 1940)
- Jack Borthwick (Australian footballer) (John Gerald Borthwick, 1884–1948), Australian rules footballer
- Jack Borthwick (footballer, born 1886) (John James Blacklaw Borthwick, 1886–1942), Scottish football centre half
- Dr John Borthwick PhD, prominent Australian travel writer and author

== See also ==
- Borthwick (surname)
