= William Borthwick =

William Borthwick may refer to:

- William Borthwick (Canadian politician) (1848–1928), mayor of Ottawa, 1895–1896
- Bill Borthwick (1924–2001), Australian politician
- William Borthwick, 1st Lord Borthwick (died 1458), Scottish peer and ambassador
- William Borthwick, 2nd Lord Borthwick (died 1483), Scottish ambassador to England
- William Borthwick, 3rd Lord Borthwick (died 1503), Scottish nobleman and ambassador
- William Borthwick, 4th Lord Borthwick (died 1542), Scottish nobleman
- William Borthwick (Dorset politician) (1879–1956), British Army Captain and barrister
- William Jason Maxwell Borthwick (1910–1998), British barrister and Royal Naval Volunteer Reserve officer
- William Borthwick (surgeon) (1641–1689), Scottish surgeon

== See also ==
- Borthwick (surname)
