= Borwick (surname) =

Borwick is an English toponymic surname. Notable people with this name include:

- Bill Borwick
- Neil Borwick
- Nancy Borwick
- Peter Borwick
- Baron Borwick
- Leonard Borwick
- Victoria Borwick
- Broch of Borwick
- George Borwick (umpire)
- George Borwick (politician)
- Jamie Borwick, 5th Baron Borwick
- Robert Borwick, 1st Baron Borwick

Other

- Borwick Hall
- Borwick railway station
- St Mary's Church, Borwick

== See also ==
- Borthwick (disambiguation)
