= Clan Borthwick =

Scottish clan

- Crest: A moor's head couped Proper wreathed Argent and Sable
- Motto: Qui conducit ("He Who Leads")

Chief
- John Hugh Borthwick of that Ilk
- 24th Lord Borthwick
- Historic seat: Borthwick Castle

Clan Borthwick is a Scottish clan.

== History ==
=== Origins of the clan ===
The name Borthwick is of territorial origin. It is a traditional origin that the progenitor of Clan Borthwick was Andreas, a Livonian knight who accompanied the Saxon Edgar the Ætheling and his sister, Margaret, who was later queen and saint, to Scotland in 1067. However recent research has suggested that the Borthwicks may have come to Scotland with Julius Caesar's Roman legions.

=== 15th century ===
Sir William Borthwick held substantial lands in Midlothian and the Scottish Borders and obtained a charter confirming the lands of Borthwick in about 1410. It is after these lands that the family was named. Also during the 15th century the Borthwicks became Lords of the Parliament of Scotland.

William Borthwick, 1st Lord Borthwick was one of the nobles who was sent as substitute hostages for the ransom of James I of Scotland in 1425. He was responsible for the construction of what is now one of the most impressive fortified dwellings in Scotland, Borthwick Castle, which remains in the ownership of the Borthwick family. The first Lord Borthwick died before 1458 and is commemorated in a splendid tomb in the old Borthwick church. The church is now in private hands.

=== 16th century ===
During the Anglo-Scottish Wars the Borthwicks fought on the side of King James IV of Scotland at the Battle of Flodden in 1513. William Borthwick, 4th Lord Borthwick, whose father had died in the previous decade, was given command of Stirling Castle and charged with the safety of the infant James V of Scotland.

John, Lord Borthwick was an opponent of the Reformation of the Church of Scotland and a supporter of Mary of Guise. His adherence to the church, however, did not mean he was in favour with the church hierarchy and in 1547 he was excommunicated for contempt of the Ecclesiastical Court of the See of St Andrews. An officer of the court, William Langlands, was dispatched to deliver the letters of excommunication to the curate of Borthwick. Langlands was seized by Borthwick's men and thrown in the mill dam north of the castle. Later they made him eat the letters, having first soaked them in wine. He was sent back with the warning that any other letters would 'a gang the same gait'.

John's son, William, was a close friend and confidant of Mary, Queen of Scots. Mary took refuge with her husband, James Hepburn, 4th Earl of Bothwell, but was forced to flee when a force under James Stewart, 1st Earl of Moray approached. She is said to have escaped dressed as a page.

In 1573, David Borthwick of Lochhill became the king's advocate or principal legal adviser. However, not all Borthwicks were nobles. Robert Borthwick was the Master Gunner to James IV of Scotland in 1509 and is said to have cast seven great cannons which were called the Seven Sisters.

=== 17th century ===
During the Wars of the Three Kingdoms the Borthwicks supported the royalist cause and their castle was besieged after the Battle of Dunbar (1650). The east wall of the castle was blasted with cannon fire from a nearby hillside. Damage was done to the outer wall (still visible to this day), but, before the wall was breached, the inhabitants of the castle surrendered to Oliver Cromwell's forces. The fortress was spared destruction when Cromwell offered Lord Borthwick terms of surrender which he accepted.

=== 18th century ===
In 1762 Henry Borthwick of Neathorn was recognised as male heir first Lord by the House of Lords. However although he assumed the title he died without heirs ten years later. During the 18th century and 19th century various branches of the family disputed the line of succession until in 1986, Major John Borthwick of Crookston was recognised by the Lord Lyon, King of Arms as Borthwick of that Ilk, chief of the name and arms of Borthwick. He also became the 23rd Lord Borthwick in the Peerage of Scotland. His son John Hugh Borthwick became the 24th Lord Borthwick three months prior to his death.

== Clan castle ==
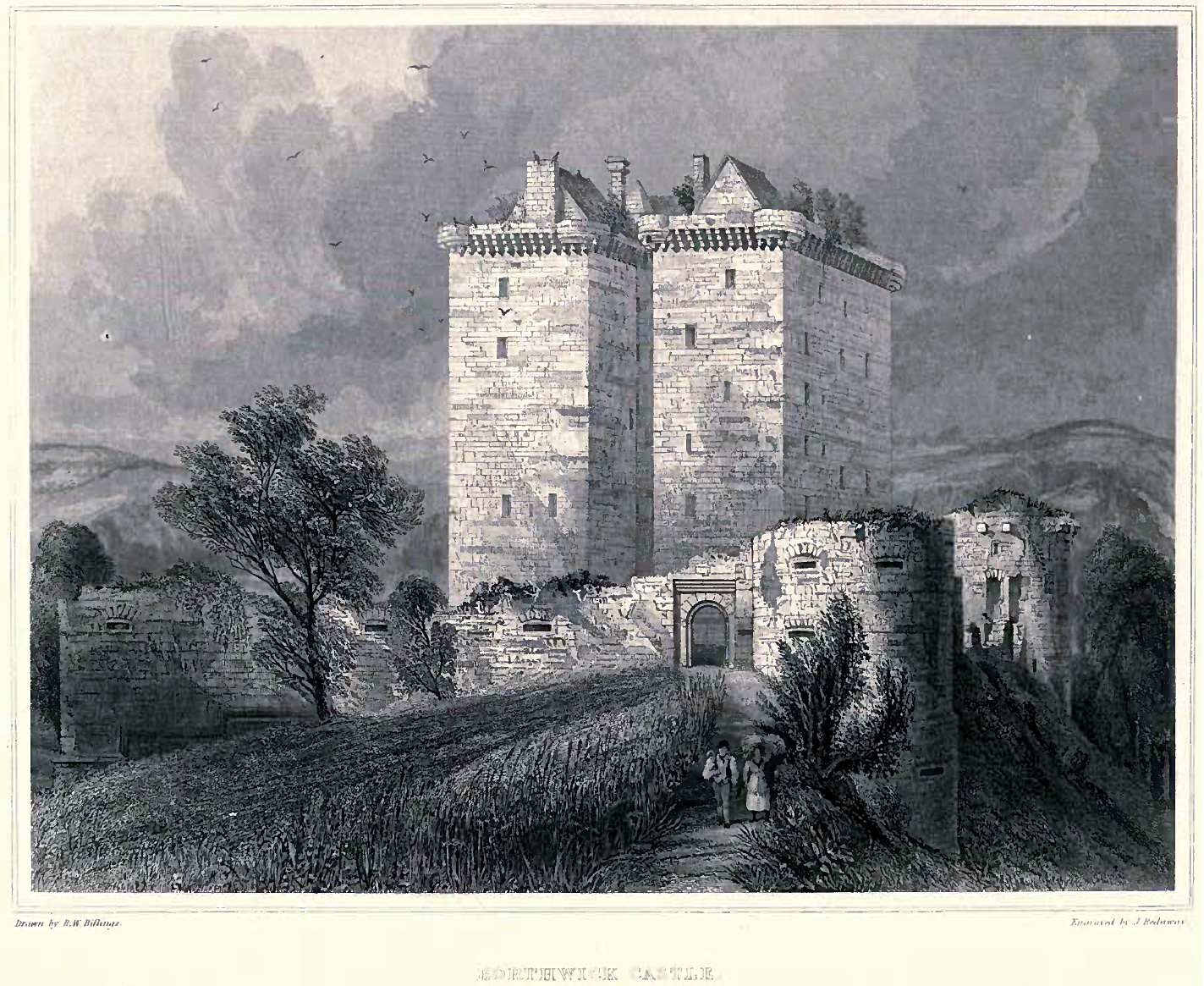
Borthwick Castle

The seat of the chief of Clan Borthwick has always been at Borthwick Castle.

== Clan chief ==
John Hugh Borthwick of that Ilk, 24th Lord Borthwick, Chief of the Name and Arms of Borthwick, 18th of Crookston, Baron of Heriotmuir.

== See also ==
- Scottish clan
- Borthwick Castle
