= Jack Borthwick =

Jack Borthwick may refer to:

- Jack Borthwick (Australian footballer) (1884–1948), Australian rules footballer
- Jack Borthwick (footballer, born 1886) (1886–1942), Scottish football centre half
