= Mountebank =

Mountebank may refer to:

- A charlatan who sells phony medicines from a platform
- Monte bank, a card game
- The Mountebanks, a comic opera by Alfred Cellier and W. S. Gilbert
