= Watty Borthwick =

Scottish footballer (1890–1969)

Personal information
- Full name: Walter Borthwick
- Date of birth: 9 January 1890
- Place of birth: Leith, Scotland
- Date of death: 15 March 1969 (aged 79)
- Place of death: Loanhead, Scotland
- Positions: Right back; half back

Senior career*
Years	Team	Apps	(Gls)
1909–1910	Leith Athletic	3	(0)
1910–	Broxburn Shamrock		
- East Fife
–1916	Cowdenbeath		
1916–1918	Hibernian	54	(0)
1918–1922	Partick Thistle	115	(1)
1920	→ Dalbeattie Star (loan)		
1923–1925	Nithsdale Wanderers	4	(0)
- * Club domestic league appearances and goals

Walter Borthwick (9 January 1890 – 15 March 1969) was a Scottish professional footballer who played in the Scottish League for Partick Thistle, Hibernian, Nithsdale Wanderers and Leith Athletic as a right back.

== Personal life ==
Borthwick's older brother Jack also became a footballer. He later worked as a school janitor and died of cardiac arrest in 1969.

== Career statistics ==
Appearances and goals by club, season and competition
Club	Season	League			Scottish Cup		Other		Total	
Club	Season	Division	Apps	Goals	Apps	Goals	Apps	Goals	Apps	Goals
Leith Athletic	1909–10	Scottish Division Two	3	0	0	0	―		3	0
Hibernian	1916–17	Scottish League	27	0	―		―		27	0
Hibernian	1917–18	Scottish League	27	0	―		―		27	0
Hibernian	Total		54	0	―		―		54	0
Partick Thistle	1918–19	Scottish League	25	1	―		―		25	1
Partick Thistle	1919–20	Scottish League	20	0	3	0	―		23	0
Partick Thistle	1920–21	Scottish League	13	0	4	0	―		17	0
Partick Thistle	1921–22	Scottish Division One	3	0	0	0	―		3	0
Partick Thistle	Total		115	1	7	0	―		122	1
Nithsdale Wanderers	1923–24	Scottish Division Three	4	0	―		1 (Note: Appearance in Scottish Qualifying Cup)	0	5	0
Career total			176	1	7	0	1	0	184	1

== Honours ==
Partick Thistle

- Scottish Cup: 1920–21
