= William Borthwick, 6th Lord Borthwick =

Scottish landowner (died 1582)

William Borthwick, 6th Lord Borthwick (died 1582) was a Scottish landowner.

== Family and war with England ==
William Borthwick was the son of John, 5th Lord Borthwick and Isobel Lindsay, daughter of David Lindsay, 8th Earl of Crawford. In September 1544, during the war known as the Rough Wooing, John, Lord Borthwick, was captured and held at Dalkeith Castle by George Douglas of Pittendreich. His wife, Isobel, Lady Borthwick, invited Patrick Hepburn, 3rd Earl of Bothwell to Borthwick and imprisoned him there until her husband was released in an exchange. A spy told an English officer William Eure that Bothwell came to the castle because "the Lady Borthwick is fair, he came to her for love, but she made him to be handled and kept". Lord Borthwick was an ally of James Hamilton, Regent of Scotland, and these kidnappings were part of his power struggle with Mary of Guise, the widow of James V.

== Privy Council ==
William Borthwick first attended the Privy Council of Scotland on 22 August 1567, when the act of abdication of Mary, Queen of Scots was read out by Lord Lindsay and James, Earl of Moray was appointed Regent of Scotland.

== Marriage and separation ==
He married Grissel Scott, daughter of Walter Scott of Branxholme and Buccleuch and Janet Beaton

In 1578 his wife Grissel Scott tried to obtain a divorce. She complained that Borthwick's behaviour was instigated by Satan, that he insulted her and hurt her physically, even when pregnant. She had lived apart from him in Edinburgh for a year and a half. The Privy Council of Scotland ordered Borthwick to pay her thirty shillings each day during the court process. In September the council judged them reconciled. Borthwick agreed he would not receive Elspeth Preston and Margaret Scott at Borthwick Castle. He argued that he should not have to pay the thirty shillings because he had invited Grissel back to Borthwick Castle to share his bed and table, and she had refused. In December 1581 Borthwick signed a bond committing himself to pay Grissel's maintenance. In October 1582 she got £111 of "aliment" money.

They had seven children, five survived to adulthood:

- William Borthwick, Master of Borthwick (d. 1571).
- James Borthwick, 7th Lord Borthwick.
- William Borthwick.
- John Borthwick.
- Alexander Borthwick.

After Borthwick's death, Grissel Scot married William Cairncross of Colmslie. In February 1593 they obtained the tower of Lugat in Stow parish.

Peerage of Scotland
Preceded by John Borthwick	Lord Borthwick; 1566–1582	Succeeded by James Borthwick
