= Monte bank =

Spanish gambling card game

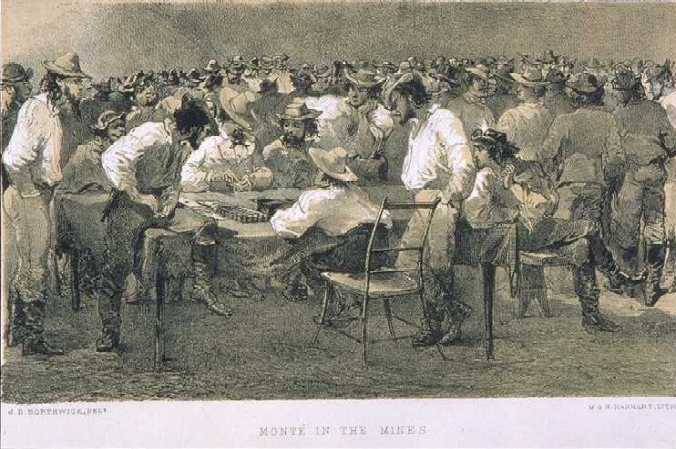
- John David Borthwick, a Scottish artist portrayed the gambling element of Monte in this lithograph.
- Origin: Spanish
- Alternative names: Monte
- Type: Gambling
- Players: 2+
- Skills: Chance
- Cards: 40
- Deck: Spanish
- Play: Counter-clockwise
- Playing time: 5–10 min.
- Chance: Easy

Related games
- Baccarat, Lansquenet, Basset, Faro

Monte bank, mountebank, Spanish monte and Mexican monte, sometimes just monte, is a Spanish gambling card game and was known in the 19th century as the national card game of Mexico. It ultimately derives from basset, where the banker (dealer) pays on matching cards. The term "monte" has also been used for a variety of other gambling games, especially varieties of three-card poker, and for the swindle three-card monte.

== History ==
The two-card version Mexican monte, and the four-card version Spanish monte, are card games played in Spain before coming to Mexico and then the American Southwest. They were originally played with Spanish playing cards and later with cards made expressly for the game, known as Monte cards, as well as modified standard decks. These games became popular in the United States, specially in Texas, after they were brought back by returning troops from the Mexican–American War in 1848. They remained popular through the end of the century particularly in the American West, and even among Native Americans.

== Gameplay ==
Monte uses a deck of 40 playing cards (removing the 10s, 9s, and 8s from a standard 52-card deck). One or more people may play against the house, known as the "bank" or "banker", who is the dealer.

=== Mexican Monte ===
In some versions, the monte banker, or dealer, must have the whole of his bank, or money which he risks at the game, in sight upon the table. The play begins with the dealer drawing one card from the bottom of the deck and placing it face up on the table, this card becomes the "bottom layout". Similarly, another card is drawn from the top of the deck, known as the "top layout", and placed face up on the table, usually closer to the dealer. The remaining stack of cards, called the "monte", is placed face-down in front of the dealer. Sometimes a monte box was used to hold the monte.

The players, sometimes known as punters, place bets on the layout of their choice, or on both. Starting with the player to banker's right and proceeding counter-clockwise, each player has one chance to place his stake on the layouts. After the last player has placed his stake, the banker turns the monte face-up. The card now showing is known as the "gate". The banker pays, one for one, any bet on a matching suit. The banker takes all the bets from a layout if the "gate" did not match the suit in the layout.

=== Spanish Monte ===
The play in four-card monte is similar. Instead of one card in the bottom and top layouts, the dealer takes two cards from the top and two more from the bottom of the deck and place them all slightly apart upon the table to form the "bottom layout" and the "top layout", respectively. The deal is valid whatever suit appears, even if all four cards are of the same suit. Except for the banker, each player may bet on either pair or both, by placing the bet between that pair. If the "gate" card's suit matches one or both of the cards in a layout, or even cards in both layouts, the players win any bets, but if no card is matched all bets are lost. This decreases the house odds somewhat, as there are frequently two suits in a layout, increasing the possibility of a match.

=== Coup ===
After the hand, known as "coup", the banker collects all losing bets and pays the winners one to one, all players whose bets matched the "gate" card in the layout. He then takes both layouts off the table, placing them aside to form a discard pile. Turning the "monte" face down, he takes the used "gate" card from the bottom of the deck and also puts it on the discard pile. He then deals for the next layout without shuffling or cutting the cards.

=== Change of banker ===
The bank and deal remain with one player up to a maximum of five "coups", six, or any previously agreed number of hands, when all of the cards are reshuffled together and in friendly play the bank (dealer) passes to the left. At least ten cards should remain unplayed to prevent players from calculating which suits still remain in the deck. If at any time the bank is emptied, bank and deal pass to the left. In casino play, the house retains the bank.

== Popular culture ==
- John Wesley Hardin killed a man over a game of monte.
- MacKenzie, Pierce (1987) The Spanish Monte Fiasco (Series: T.G. Horne, No. 4) New American Library, New York, ISBN 0-451-14863-0, is an adventure novel set in the American Old West.
- According to JD Borthwick, Indians always disposed of their money in two ways: playing "Monte" with Mexicans and purchasing articles of clothing.
- In Owen Wister's novel, The Virginian calls his horse Monte, apparently after the card game.

== See also ==
- Basset (card game)
- Faro (card game)
- Lansquenet
- Three-card Monte
