= Basset (card game) =

Gambling card game

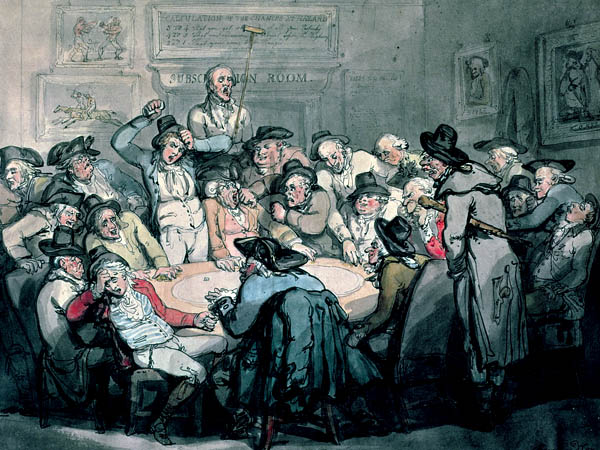
- Thomas Rowlandson painted his version of a gaming den in "The Hazard Room". On the walls is a bouquet of gambler’s delights: boxing, horse racing, the odds of the day, and the patron saint of card games, Edmond Hoyle.
- Origin: Italian
- Type: card game
- Players: Np.
- Skills: Counting
- Cards: 52
- Deck: Anglo-American
- Play: Clockwise
- Playing time: 10–15 min.
- Chance: Medium

Related games
- Baccarat, Lansquenet, Faro, Monte Bank

Basset (French bassette, from the Italian bassetta), also known as barbacole and hocca, is a gambling game using cards, that was considered one of the most polite. It was intended for persons of the highest rank because of the great losses or gains that might be accrued by players.

== Basset in Italy ==
According to DELI (Dizionario etimologico della lingua italiana), the word Basetta is first recorded in the first half of the 15th century. The game Basset is described by a few authors as having been invented in 1593 by a noble Venetian named Pietro Cellini, who was punished with exile in Corsica for his contrivance. It may have been devised out of the game of Hocca, Hoca or even Hoc, considered the precursor and an outlawed form of Italian roulette at which people lost considerable sums of money and also an early iteration of Biribi, which was brought into fashion by Cardinal Mazarin.

== Basset in France ==
Basset was first introduced into France by Signior Justiniani, ambassador of Venice, in 1674. The game was very popular at the court of King Charles II, and even after 15 January 1691 when Louis XIV issued an order from the privy council, by which he expressly forbade not only the officers belonging to his army, but likewise all other persons of whatever sex or denomination to play at Hoca, Pharaoh, Barbacole and Basset. The sums of money lost in France at this game were so considerable that the nobility were in danger of being undone after many persons of distinction were ruined. Later the law against gambling was tightened eluding which they disguised Basset under the name of "pour et contre", that is, "for and against".

By the constitution of Basset, large advantages were secured to the tailleur (the dealer / keeper of the bank) and so vast were their gains, that the privilege of keeping a bank at Basset, where the stakes were unlimited, was granted only to cadets or other members of great families. It was basically certain that a considerable fortune could be realized by the tailleur in a short time. The advantages of the dealer arise in many ways, but mainly from the temptations for adventurous players to increase their stakes on certain desperate chances, which rarely turn up, and which in the long run told largely in favor of the bank. Where licenses were otherwise conceded for keeping a public Basset table in France, the stakes were strictly limited to twelve pence.

== Basset in England ==
Basset migrated to England in about 1677, introduced by a croupier called Morin, but never caught on outside Court circles on account of its costliness and the heavy risks it entailed on the players. Its heyday seems to have been in the early 18th century. It has no place in Cotton's 1674 The Complete Gamester, but rates a lengthy entry in the 1721 edition where the fierceness of the gambling is stressed. It is there described as a "French Game", presumably because it was imported from France. The game's high stakes, along with its devastations, is the subject of Susanna Centlivre's 1705 comedy The Basset Table.

The English made Basset quite different from what it was in France where, by royal edict, the public at large were not allowed to play at more than a franc or ten-penny bank, – and the losses or gains could not bring desolation to a family. In England the punters (gamblers) could do as they liked, staking from one guinea to one hundred guineas and more, upon a card. After three or four years, many players had impoverished their families to such an extent that Parliament enacted a prohibition with severe penalties against both games.

However, it was "of so bewitching a nature," says our old writer, "by reason of the several multiplications and advantages which it seemingly offered to the unwary punter, that a great many like it so well that they would play at small game rather than give out; and rather than not play at all would punt at six-penny, three-penny, nay, a two-penny bank, – so much did the hope of winning the quinze-et-le-va and the trente-et-le-va intoxicate them."

== The edge ==
The play in Basset resulted in, basically, a lottery. A player might occasionally win, but the big winner was the dealer (banker). The dealer had a number of privileges under the rules, including having the sole disposal of the first and last card; this gave them a significant edge. This was a truth so acknowledged in France that the king ordered, by public edict, that the privilege of a tallière (banker) should be allowed only to the chief cadets (sons of noblemen). His assumption was that whoever kept the bank must, in a very short time, acquire a considerable fortune.

== Modern rules ==
This interpretation is based on the glossary and the rules in The Compleat Gamester as described in the 5th edition (1725).

Each player (punter) takes a "book" of cards from another deck (13 cards of the same suit). Players place cards whose rank they wish to bet on to the table. They can place as many (or as few) cards as they wish. The amount wagered (couch) on each card can also vary according to the player's choice. No new cards may be added once play begins.

The banker (talliere) shuffles a deck of 52 cards (without jokers) and lifts the deck to reveal the bottom card (fasse). Any players who have bets on this rank must pay half the value of their wager to the banker (from their personal stock, not from the cards themselves). This bottom card is then discarded. The banker then reveals the first players’ card (winning). Any players who have wagered on that card's rank may receive a payout of 1:1. The banker then reveals a second card, the bank's card (losing). Any players who wagered on this rank lose their wager and their card of that rank is removed from play (this rank can no longer truly "win" wagers on any draw for the rest of this round as all players' wagers on this rank have now been lost). The banker continues in this manner, drawing a players’ (winning) card, then a bank’s (losing) card, calling out the values and resolving wagers.

If a rank is revealed as both the players' and the bank's (twins, a tie) the draw is null and no wagers (or parlays) are lost or paid. However, if a rank is drawn as the players' "winning" card twice in a row (including after a tie), it instead loses.

If a player's wager wins, instead of accepting the payout (1:1), they may place a token (small die, coin, etc.) on a corner of a card to parlay (paroli) their bet. If this card wins again (before being drawn as the bank's), the player wins an increased payout (see Parlay Table below). Instead of accepting this increased winning, the player may again refuse the payout to push their luck further by placing another token on a second corner. The player may continue in this manner on subsequent wins, either accepting the payout or continuing to parlay with tokens added to the card. If the deck runs out and the player still has a parlayed card on the table, that card must carry over into the next round until it either pays or loses. Any wager that has been parlayed may not be altered until it either wins or loses. If a parlayed card ever loses (drawn as the bank's), the player only loses the original wager that was placed on the card regardless of any current parlay.

Parlay Table
Win #	Payout	Name
1st Win	1:1	The Pay
2nd Win	2:1	Paroli
3rd Win	7:1	Sept-et-le-va
4th Win	15:1	Quinze-et-le-va
5th Win	33:1	Trente-et-le-va
6th Win	67:1	Soixante-et-le-va

Alternatively, after a card wins (either for a 1:1 payout or after the payout of any parlay), the player may remove their card of that rank from play and place no more wagers on it. Or, the player may accept the payout (either 1:1 or after any successful parlay) and place the same wager as their original bet (or higher) on that same card as a new bet (masse) with any previous parlay tokens removed.

The final card in the deck is null and pays nothing, no wagers (or parlays) are lost or paid. Players then prepare for the next round by placing new cards and wagers or removing others from the table. However, any standing parlays may not be removed or altered until the next round reveals whether they win or lose.

=== Paroli system ===
Sources differ on whether the first parlay pays 2:1 or is the sept-et-le-va of 7:1. Many sources, including Andrew Steinmetz's 1870 work, source back to the ruleset described in the later editions of The Compleat Gamester. The second parlay is most commonly depicted as being the sept-et-le-va, per these rules. However, this would give a mathematical edge to the players with approximately a 25% chance to win 7 times their wager.

In all editions of The Compleat Gamester which include Basset, this issue is confused by the wording of the glossary. This includes that to achieve a soissant-et-le-va requires carrying the parlay into the next round, but not the trent-et-le-va. However, the same glossary describes the player adjusting the third corner of their card for a quinze-et-le-va and the fourth corner of their card for a trent-et-le-va. If the sept-et-le-va follows the original paroli, only one corner would have been adjusted, suggesting another parlay that is not well described.

The glossary entry for The Pay in The Compleat Gamester mentions the doubling of the player's wager if "by this adventure Fortune favors him" after having already established the 1:1 payout of whatever their first stake may be on their first win. This suggests a 2:1 payout that precedes the 7:1 sept-et-leva. This accounts for both the number of corners altered before the described quinze-et-le-va (the first being the 2:1, then the 7:1, and third the 15:1) and gives the mathematical edge to the bank for which the game of Basset is historically infamous. Additionally, this interpretation of the parlay system is more consistent in the use of odds as associated with other games of chance that include parlays.

=== Variants ===
The Compleat Gamester states that a masse is only permitted on winning cards. However, in Act IV of Susanna Centlivre's 1705 comedy The Basset Table (in which the characters are playing Basset), losing cards are not removed from the table and players seem to be permitted to masse a further couch on them (as in Faro).

== Source rules ==
The players sat round a table, the talliere (banker/dealer) in the midst of them, with the bank of gold before him, and the punters or players each having a book of 13 cards. Each laid down one, two, three, or more, as they pleased, with money upon them, as stakes. The talliere took the remaining pack in his hand and turned them up, with the bottom card appearing being called the fasse; he was then paid half the value of the stakes laid down by the punters upon any card of that sort (rank).

After the fasse was turned up, and the talliere and croupiere (bet collector, similar to a stickman) had looked round the cards on the table, and taken advantage of the money laid on them, the former proceeded with his deal; and the next card appearing, whether the king, queen, ace, or whatever it might be, won for the player (1–1 payout), the latter might receive it, or making paroli (parlay their bet), as before said, go on to sept-et-le-va (7–1 payout). The card after that won for the talliere, who took money from each player's card of that sort, and brought it into his bank, an obvious and prodigious advantage over the players.

The talliere, if the winning card was a king, and the next after it was a ten, said (showing the cards all round): 'King wins, ten loses,' paying the money to such cards and taking the money from those who lost, adding it to his bank. This done, he went on with the deal: 'Ace wins, five loses; 'Knave (Jack) wins, seven loses;' and so on, every other card alternately winning and losing, till all the pack was dealt but the last card. According to the rules of the game, the last card turned up was for the advantage of the talliere; although a player might have one of the same sort, still it was allowed to him as one of the dues of his office, he (the tallière) paid nothing on it.

The bold player who was lucky and adventurous, and could push on his couch with a considerable stake to sept-et-le-va (7–1 payout), quinze-et-le-va (15–1 payout), trente-et-le-va (33–1 payout), etc., must in a wonderful manner have multiplied his couch, or first stake up to soissante-et-le-va (67-1 payout); but this was seldom done; and the loss of the players, by the very nature of the game, invariably exceeded that of the bank; in fact, this game was altogether in favour of the bank; and yet it is evident that, in spite of this obvious conviction, the game must have been one of the most tempting and fascinating that was ever invented.

Suppose ten, or any other card wins for the punter, if another ten comes up just after in the winning card's place, it does not win for him, but for the bank, but if it comes up three or four cards after that, it wins for the punter. For example, if ace or any other card wins at first, and afterwards come up again in the next winning card's place, it does not go for the punters, but by a term they have for that part of the game is said to retire, till the next opportunity, because by the rule of the game it must go for the bank before the punter. But then in return of this, and subtly to gain the esteem of all the young adventurers who are apt to let their money briskly, if the same card happens to come in the next losing place (tie), it does not lose, because it has not gone for the punter but also retires without paying the bank, having won a couch, which the talliere saves, and should have paid.

=== Frauds ===
Of course there were frauds practiced at Basset by the talliere, or banker, in addition to his prescriptive advantages. The cards might be dealt so as not to allow the punter any winning throughout the pack; and it was in the power of the dealer to let the punter have as many winnings as he thought convenient.

=== Glossary ===
By 1870 the game as described in England used a mixture of French and English words and spellings:

- The tallière (banker), who laid down a sum of money to answer every winning card which might turn up.
- The croupière (assistant of the former), standing by to supervise the losing cards, so that when there were many at play, he might not lose by overlooking anything which might turn up to his profit.
- The punter: (in French, ponter – to bet), hence, each player.
- The fasse: the first card turned up by the tallière, by which he gained half the value of the money laid upon every card of that sort by the punters or players.
- The couch (from couche, stake): which was the first stake that each punter laid upon each card. Each player had a book of 13 cards before him, upon which he must lay his money.
- The paroli (probably from parole, to "give your word" - parlay the bet): whoever won the couch, and intended to go on for another advantage, crooked the corner of his card to indicate he would let his money lie, without being paid the value by the tallière.
- The masse: when those who had won the couch, would venture more money on the same card.
- The pay: when the player had won the couch, and, being doubtful of making the paroli, left off; for by going for the pay, if the card turned up wrong, he lost nothing, having won the couch before; but if by this adventure, fortune favoured him, he won double the money he had staked.
- The alpieu: when the couch was won by turning up, or crooking, the corner of the winning card.
- The sept-et-le-va (seven and the go): the first great chance that showed the advantages of the game, namely, if the player had won the couch, and then made a paroli by crooking the corner of his card, and going on to a second chance, if his winning card turned up again, it became a sept-et-le-va, which was seven times as much as he had laid upon his card.
- The quinze-et-le-va (fifteen and the go): attending the player's humour, who, perhaps, was resolved to follow his fancy, and still lay his money upon the same card, which was done by crooking the third corner of his card. If this card came up by the dealing of the talliere, it made him win 15 times as much money as he staked.
- The trent-et-le-va (trente – thirty and the go): marked by the lucky player by crooking the end of the fourth corner of his card, which, coming up, made him win three and thirty (33) times as much money as he staked.
- The soissante-et-le-va (soixante -sixty and the go): is the highest and greatest chance that could happen in the game, for it paid sixty seven (67) times as much money as was staked. It was seldom won except by some player who pushed his good fortune to the utmost.

== Mathematical calculations ==
Basset has been the object of mathematical calculations. Abraham de Moivre estimated the loss of the punter under any circumstance of cards remaining in the stock when he lays his stake, and of any number of times that his card is repeated in the stock. De Moivre created a table showing the several losses of the punter in whatsoever circumstances he may happen to be. From this table it appears:

1. That the fewer the cards are in the stock, the greater is the loss of the punter.
2. That the least loss of the punter, under the same circumstances of cards remaining in the stock, is when the card is but twice in it; the next greater when but three times; still greater when four times; and the greatest when but once. The gain of the banker upon all the money adventured at Basset is 15s 3d. per cent.

== See also ==
- Faro (card game)
- Cassino (card game)
- The Four False Weapons (a detective fiction by John Dickson Carr)

== Sources ==
Steinmetz, Andrew (1870) "Chapter X: Piquet, Basset, Faro, Hazard, Passe-dix, Put, Cross and Pile, Thimble-rig" The Gaming Table: Its Votaries and Victims: In all times and countries, especially in England and in France Vol. II, Tinsley Brothers, London, OCLC 5963855; online at Project Gutenberg
