= Lansquenet =

Gambling game played with cards

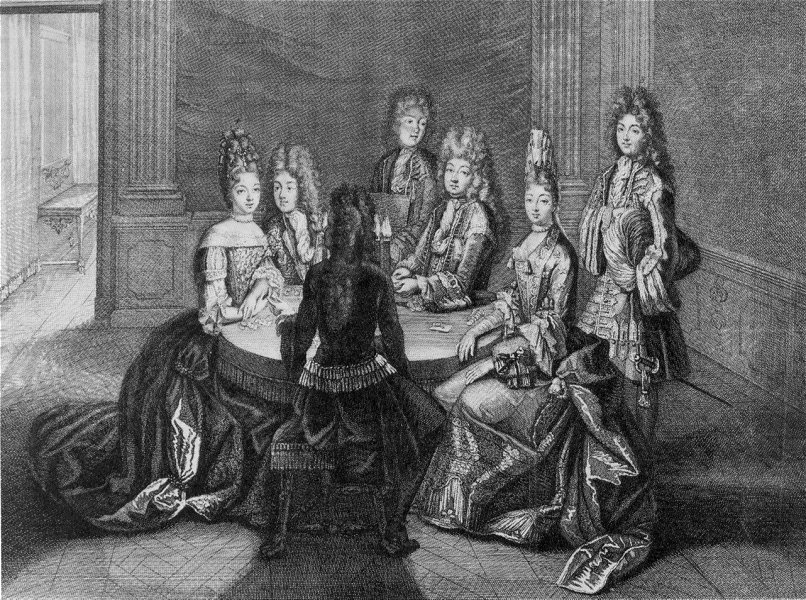
- Grand Dauphin Louis plays Lansquenet at Versailles (1694)
- Type: Gambling
- Players: 3+
- Skills: Chance, Counting
- Cards: 40
- Deck: Italian
- Play: Clockwise
- Playing time: 5–10 min.
- Chance: Easy

Related games
- Baccarat, Monte Bank, Basset, Faro

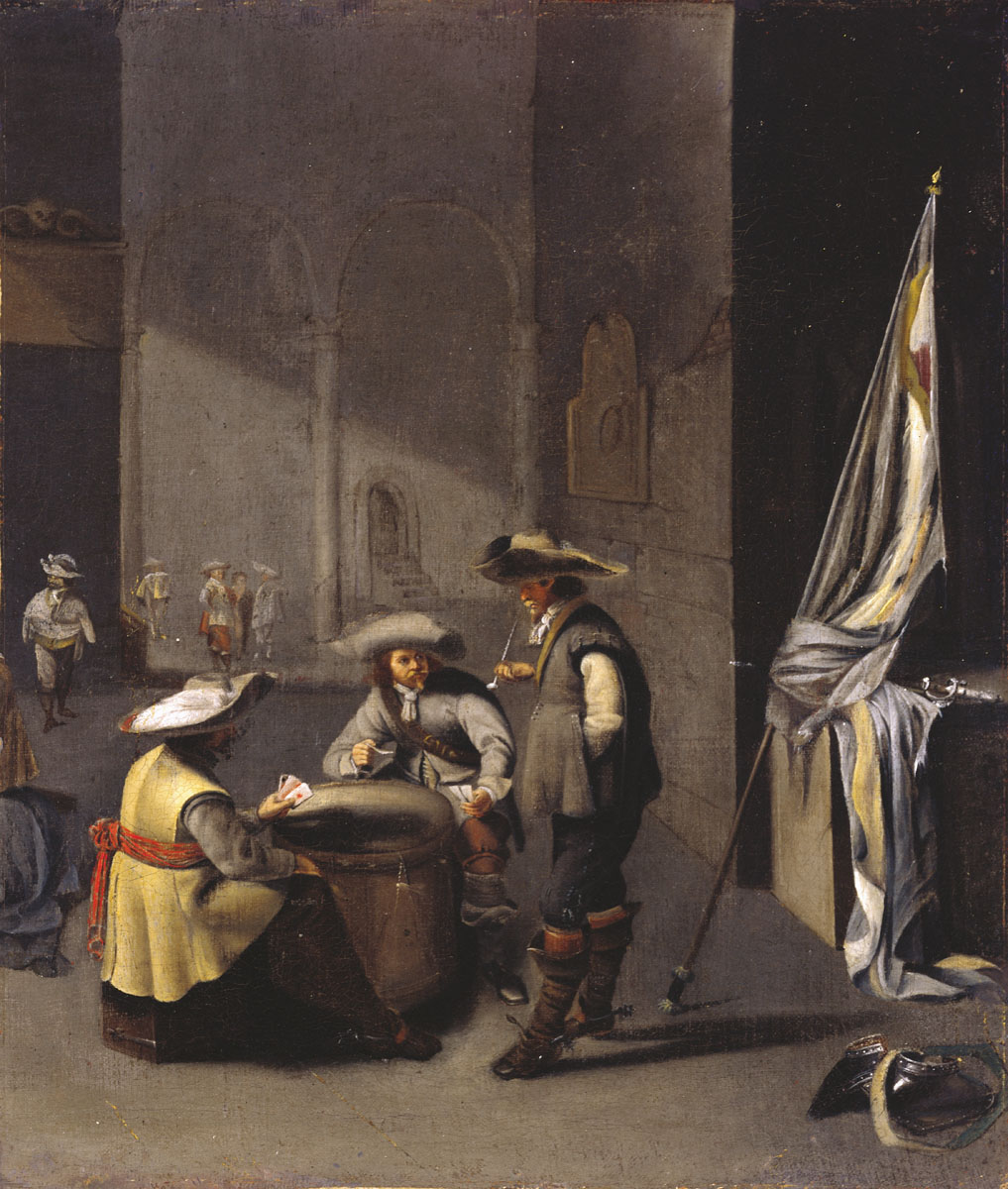
Jacob Duck: guardroom with soldiers playing cards, 17th century

Lansquenet is a banking game played with cards, named after the French spelling of the German word Landsknecht ('servant of the land or country'), which refers to 15th- and 16th-century German mercenary foot soldiers; the lansquenet drum is a type of field drum used by these soldiers. It is recorded as early as 1534 by François Rabelais in Gargantua and Pantagruel.

== Cards ==
Lansquenet is played with an Italian pack of 40 cards.

== Play ==
The dealer or banker stakes a certain sum, and this must be met by the nearest to the dealer first, and so on. When the stake is met, the dealer turns up one card and lays it to his right, for the table or the players, and another card in front of himself for the bank. He then keeps on turning up cards (while keeping the first two cards visible), until a card turns up with a value matching either of the first two cards. For instance, if the five of diamonds has been laid down for the bank, then any other five, regardless of suit, constitutes a win for the banker. If the table's card is matched first, he loses, and the next player on the left becomes banker and proceeds in the same way.

When the dealer's card turns up, he may take the stake and pass the bank; or he may allow the stake to remain, whereupon it becomes doubled if met. He can continue thus (doubling on each win) as long as the cards turn up in his favour (i.e., before the table's card appears, causing the banker to lose only his original stake) – having the option at any moment of giving up the bank and retiring for that time. If he does that, the player to whom he passes the bank has the option of continuing it at the same amount at which it was left. The pool may be re-made up by contributions of all the players in certain proportions (now including the previous bank player). The terms used respecting the standing of the stake are "I'll see" (à moi le tout) and Je tiens. When jumelle (twins), or the turning up of similar cards on both sides, occurs, then the dealer takes half the stake.

Robert-Houdin explained a mechanism by which a card sharp could cheat at lansquenet, by palming and then placing atop the deck a packet of cards in prepared order.

== Cultural references ==
Lansquenet is listed by François Rabelais in Gargantua in 1534. The game is played by Porthos in the Alexandre Dumas novel The Three Musketeers. Lansquenet is also played by D'Artagnan in the Dumas novel Twenty Years After. Lucien Debray imagines Baroness Danglers might occupy herself with lansquenet in the Dumas novel The Count of Monte Cristo. Lansquenet is played by various characters in the Pierre Choderlos de Laclos novel Les Liaisons dangereuses.

A game in Le financier et le savetier (1856) by Jacques Offenbach enables the cobbler to win the hand of the financier's daughter. It is mentioned briefly in the novel À Rebours by Joris-Karl Huysmans, and in the novel The General in his Labyrinth by Gabriel García Márquez. Lansquenet is played by two soldiers on a stone bench under an enclosed poplar as mentioned in Kinbote's note to line 130 in Pale Fire by Vladimir Nabokov, and is also played by Fatima and her family in Charles Perrault's Bluebeard.

Lansquenet-sous-Tannes is a fictional village in Joanne Harris' novel Chocolat. It is mentioned in The Prague Cemetery by Umberto Eco. The game is mentioned in several of Georgette Heyer's historical novels. For example, in Chapter Thirteen of "The Masqueraders", Lansquenet is played in the novel The Luck of Barry Lyndon by William Makepeace Thackeray. Lansquenet is played by the protagonist in the 2022 video game Pentiment.

== Sources ==
- Steinmetz, Andrew. The Gaming Table: Its Votaries and Victims, In All Times and Countries, especially in England and France. Tinsley Brothers, 1870. ISBN 978-0-87585-096-2
