= Bill Borwick =

Australian rules footballer, born 1913

Personal information
- Full name: Bill Borwick
- Born: 27 November 1913
- Died: 29 July 1997 (aged 83)
- Original team: Colac Imperials

Playing career^{1}
Years	Club	Games (Goals)
1935	Geelong	1 (0)
- ^{1} Playing statistics correct to the end of 1935.

Bill Borwick (27 November 1913 – 29 July 1997) was an Australian rules footballer who played with Geelong in the Victorian Football League (VFL).
