= Alastair Borthwick =

Scottish writer

Alastair Charles Borthwick OBE (17 February 1913 – 25 September 2003) was a Scottish author and broadcaster whose books recorded the popularisation of climbing as a working class sport in Scotland, and the Second World War from the perspective of an infantryman.

== Biography ==
Borthwick was born in Rutherglen but raised in Troon and later Glasgow where he attended Glasgow High School and was a member of the school's Officer Training Corps. He left school at the age of sixteen to become a copytaker for the Evening Times. Soon afterwards, he joined the Glasgow Weekly Herald, a smaller newspaper where, as part of a staff of five, he wrote on a wide variety of topics, including front page leads, the women's and children's pages and compiling the crossword.

It was through writing for the Herald's "Open Air" page that he discovered rock climbing, an activity which had traditionally been the preserve of the well off, but was becoming increasingly popular with young, working-class Glaswegians. The nascent subculture of poor but resourceful people hitchhiking north, camping or "dossing" in caves and bothies became the mainstay of his Open Air columns, and later his first book, Always a Little Further, which was published in 1939.

The book documented this social change, which Ken Wilson described as "...as if a group of East Enders had suddenly decided to take up grouse-shooting or polo," with accounts of encounters with tramps, tinkers and hawkers, and of hitching to Ben Nevis in a lorry full of dead sheep, all described in Borthwick's humorous style. It became a classic and has never been out of print since its publication.

During the Second World War Borthwick served with a variety of British Army units in North Africa, Sicily and Western Europe. Initially he served as a private in the Highland Light Infantry, but due to his OTC experience was to have been commissioned as a second lieutenant on 2 September 1939. However, for some reason this commission was cancelled and in the end he was not commissioned until 3 November 1941, by which time he was a lance-corporal. His service number was 104763.

He worked mainly as a Battalion Intelligence Officer and reached the rank of captain. He transferred to the Reconnaissance Corps on 14 January 1941, having by then being promoted to war substantive lieutenant. He transferred to the 5th Seaforth Highlanders on 13 October 1944. His most significant feat came in the Netherlands towards the end of the War, when he led a battalion of 600 men behind enemy lines in the dark, relying on his sense of direction as the maps were inaccurate. The Germans woke up the next morning to find the British dug in behind them.

After the War, Borthwick wrote his second book, Sans Peur (republished as Battalion in 1994), which was a history of his regiment during the second half of the war. Unlike many regimental histories written by committees or retired generals, it was written from the perspective of a junior officer who fought on the front line, and was highly acclaimed.

For the rest of his career Borthwick worked mainly as a television and radio broadcaster, writing and presenting programs on subjects from Joseph McCarthy to Bonnie Prince Charlie. He regarded Scottish Soldier as his best work from this period. It was a thirteen part series about the history of the Scottish regiments, told from the point of view of the infantryman. He was appointed an Officer of the Order of the British Empire (OBE) in the 1952 New Year Honours for his part in organizing an engineering exhibition as part of the Festival of Britain.
