= MV Borthwick =

MV Borthwick may refer to:

- MV Borthwick – a 1940 coaster launched as MV Empire Gat
- MV Borthwick – a 1977 LPG Tanker
