= Broch of Borwick =

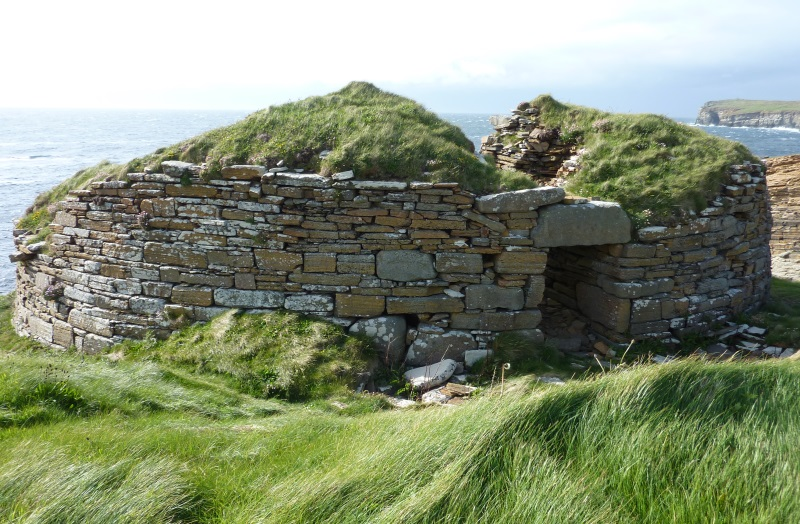
- Broch of Borwick

- Location within Orkney Islands
- 59.031023°N 3.353398°W
- Type: Broch
- Periods: Iron Age
- Location: Mainland, Orkney

The Broch of Borwick is an Iron Age broch located on Mainland, Orkney, Scotland (grid reference HY22411678). It is a scheduled monument.

== Location ==
The Broch of Borwick is located 8 kilometres southwest of Dounby on Mainland, Orkney. The broch stands on top of a cliff-top promontory 20 metres above the sea. A small stream runs past the site immediately to the east.

== Description ==
The broch has an external diameter of 17 metres and an internal diameter of 8 metres. The walls which are 3.5 to 5 metres thick currently stand to a maximum height of 2.6 metres. The eastern half of the broch and the entrance passage are well preserved, but the western half has been destroyed by erosion. The entrance passage, which is still lintelled over, is 5.6 metres long with door-checks each formed of a slab set on edge 3 metres from the outside. A guard cell opened off the right of the passage.

The broch was once cut off from the flat land beyond by an outer wall, and there were outbuildings between the wall and the broch.

== Excavations ==
The site was excavated in 1881 by W. G. T. Watt, and the interior was cleared of debris. Ashes, bones and shells mixed with clay were found under the rubble. Beneath this was a layer of small flat stones and under this the broch floor. Finds included several combs, a small whale vertebra cup, a spindle whorl, a stone gaming piece, a whetstone, hammerstones, some stone knives and choppers, an iron rod, and some querns.
