= Jessica Borthwick =

British adventurer, filmmaker and sculptor

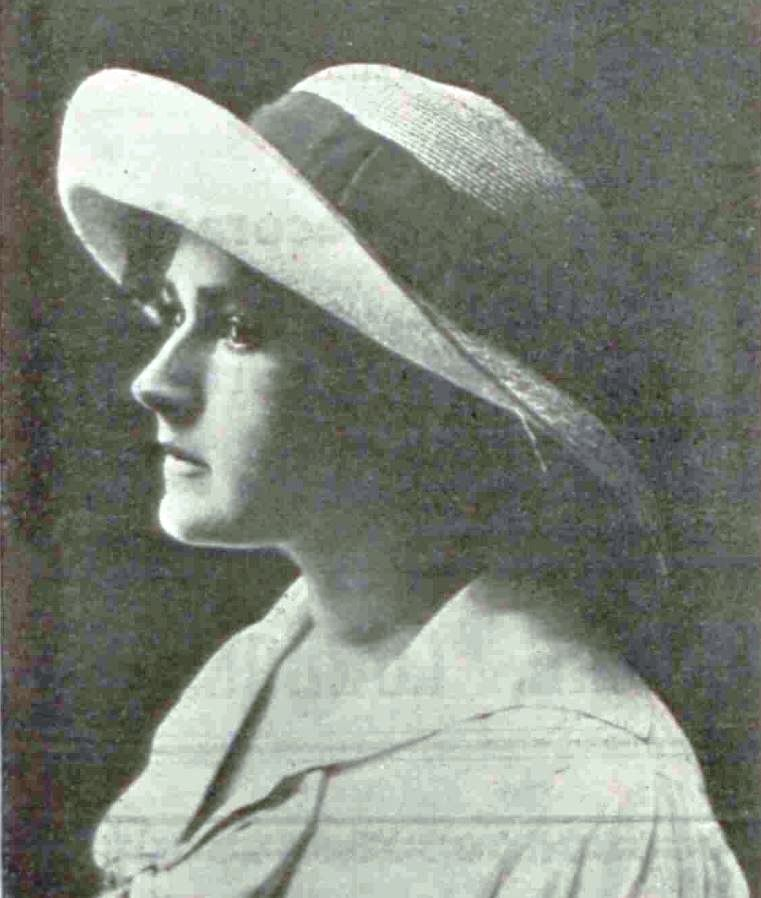
Jessica Borthwick in 1914

Jessica Elvira Borthwick (1888–1946) was a British adventurer, sculptor and filmmaker. Most notably she was probably the first woman to film a war, when she took a motion picture camera to the Balkan Wars in 1913.

== Early life ==
She was born Jessie Elvira Borthwick, in Richmond, Surrey, but was known as Jessica. Her parents were General George Colville Borthwick (1839–1896), an officer in the Turkish army, and his wife Sophie (née Schylowskála), reportedly the daughter of a member of the Russian Imperial Guard. Her uncle was Algernon Borthwick, 1st Baron Glenesk, Conservative politician and owner of The Morning Post newspaper (ownership of the newspaper passed to his wife Alice Beatrice Borthwick following his death in 1908). Her father was made commander-in-chief of the Turkish forces in Eastern Rumelia, which became part of Bulgaria after 1885.

== Balkan War ==
Borthwick used her father's connections to undertake a year-long expedition to the Second Balkan War (1913), attached to the Bulgarian army. She took a motion picture camera with her, having undertaken three days of instruction in its use from manufacturer Arthur Newman. She also took a still camera with her, and a revolver.

An interview with Borthwick in The Bioscope film trade paper gives a detailed account of her experiences:

During the cholera rage in Adrianople everything connected with that terrible disease was painted black. The carts in which the dead bodies were carried away were black, for example, as were the coffins in which cholera victims were buried. While the scourge was at its height I went down into the gipsy quarter to take a small film. The people in this part of the city had never seen a camera before, and when they saw me pointing my little black box at various objects they thought that I was operating some wonderful new instrument for combating the disease which was destroying them. Quickly surrounding me, they came and knelt upon the ground, kissing my feet and clothing, and begging with dreadful pathos that I should cure them. It was a task as sad as it was difficult to explain that their hopes were mistaken, and that I was impotent to help them.

She shot around 2,500 feet of film and many still pictures, though some of both were ruined when boxes with undeveloped negatives were opened by Bulgarian customs. She then put on lectures with her films and slides at London's Scala Theatre in February 1914, under the title of The Aftermath of the Balkan War. This venture was less successful than she had hoped, and she was sued by her projectionist William Arthur for non-payment of wages. Her films and photographs of the Balkan War are now believed to be lost. An illustrated book A Girl's Experiences of the Balkan War was announced in September 1914 but appears not to have been published.

== World War One ==
In mid-1914 she took a film camera to Spitsbergen, where she farmed reindeer and hunted seals. She had announced that she would be taking a Newman cinematograph camera with her, but any films that she may have taken were not exhibited, and no longer survive. Her Arctic adventure was then halted by World War I.

At the start of the war she volunteered her services to the Admiralty. She captained her steam yacht Grace Darling, delivering Red Cross stores across the Channel and rescuing refugees from Ostend, a venture which had support of some kind from the Northcliffe press. She then served as an ambulance worker in Belgium, founding the Allies Field Ambulance Corps which was attached to the Belgian Field Hospital at Veurne, and in November 1914 was wounded in a leg by a shell. A Belgian colonel was said to have made her an honorary non-commissioned corporal in thanks for her services. In 1915 she visited Serbia with the Ambulance Corps. Towards the end of the war, she formed the British Empire Army of Patriots organisation with Liberal politician Havelock Wilson.

== Toy manufacturer ==
In the latter half of war Borthwick established a reputation as a sculptor, using the name Nell Foy. In 1916 she opened a doll-manufacturing business under that name in Chelsea, originally staffed entirely by women. Her idea was to replace some of the toy trade from Germany, which had dominated the toy business in the pre-war era. The firm produced dolls, wax statuettes and dioramas.

Her dioramas include the war-themed Dr Elsie Inglis operating in a hospital tent in Serbia and Sergeant-Major Flora Sandes and troops in Serbia, commissioned for the Imperial War Museum. She exhibited at several London exhibitions that promoted the work undertaken by women in wartime.

== Later life and death ==
Borthwick spent her latter years living with her mother in South Kensington, London, a Bohemian figure with her fondness for pipe smoking, and always hopeful of finding new adventures. In 1921, still using the name Nell Foy, she experimented with colour music. In the late 1920s and early 1930s, under her true name, she became involved in Russian traditional music, her Russian choir appearing on BBC television on 14 November 1932 in an early broadcast using the John Logie Baird process. Later she teamed with Russian conductor and composer Vladimir Launitz. At the end of the Second World War she promoted herself as a psychologist, giving lectures for the Soldiers', Sailors', and Airmen's Families Association. She died of gas poisoning in a room in Beaufort Gardens, Kensington, on 1 November 1946. The coroner recorded a verdict of accidental death.

== Media references ==
Borthwick's First World War adventures are referred to in the Doctor Who audio drama Brotherhood of the Daleks (2008), written by Alan Barnes.
