= William Borthwick, 2nd Lord Borthwick =

Scottish diplomat

William Borthwick, 2nd Lord Borthwick (died between 6 October 1483 and 7 February 1484) was a Scottish landowner and ambassador to England.

He was a son of William Borthwick, 1st Lord Borthwick. Borthwick served as ambassador to England in 1459, his name was included in a safe-conduct or passport of 13 July as "William lord Borthwik" to travel to Newcastle with numerous other nobles, clerics, and a retinue of 200 attendants. On 11 April 1464 he was, with other senior peers, commissioned by James III of Scotland to negotiate with the ambassadors of Edward IV of England to conclude the treaty of York.

He sat in parliament on 9 October 1466 and 14 October 1467, and in several subsequent parliaments until his death. Lord Borthwick was one of the Lords of the Articles pro baronibus, in the parliament that sat at Edinburgh on 4 October 1479.

In August 1471 he received a safe-conduct with several clerics and other nobles, and a retinue of 400 persons, allowing travel to England as "ambassadors and commissioners of the King of Scots coming to treat with the English commissioners". He was named in another safe-conduct as a Scottish ambassador on 24 August 1478.

His son and heir William Borthwick, appears as defender in a legal case, an action of debt on 4 July 1476. Judgement was given against him. Father and son appeared again together in an action on 16 October 1479, and had a judgement in their favour.

Alexander Nisbet, a writer on heraldic matters, published a 1484 charter referring to this Lord Borthwick and his spouse Margaret Hoppringle. They are said to have married in 1458 leaving issue, their son and heir William Borthwick, 3rd Lord Borthwick.

Peerage of Scotland
Preceded by William Borthwick	Lord Borthwick c 1470 – c 1484	Succeeded by William Borthwick
