= Borthwick Castle =

Castle in Midlothian, Scotland

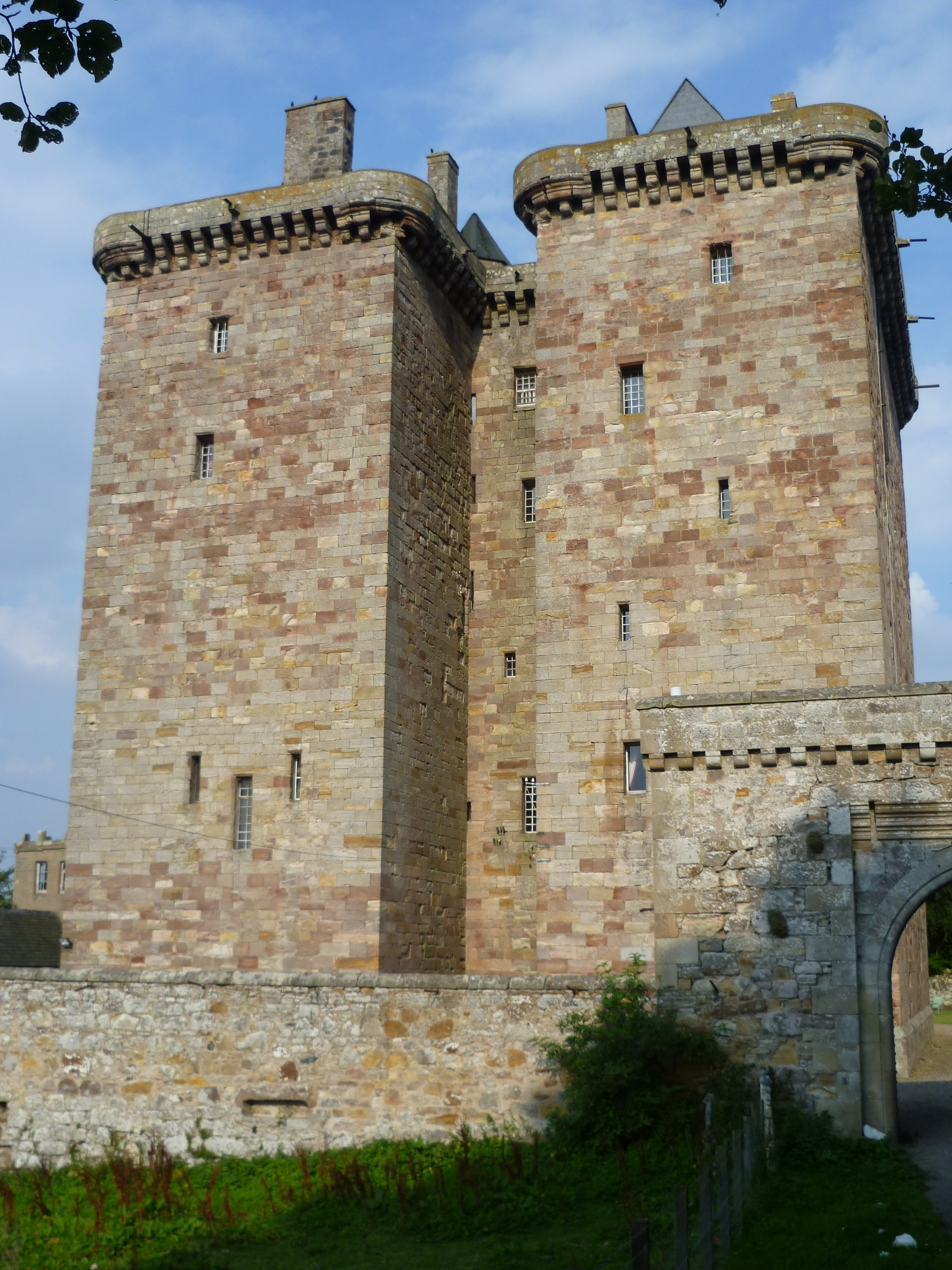
- Borthwick Castle

Site information
- Type: Castle

Location
- Coordinates: 55.8267°N 3.0074°W
- Height: 90 feet (area - battlements)

Site history
- Built: 1430
- In use: 1430-?

Borthwick Castle is one of the largest and best-preserved surviving medieval Scottish fortifications. It is located twelve miles (19 km) south-east of Edinburgh, to the east of the village of Borthwick, on a site protected on three sides by a steep fall in the ground. It was constructed in 1430 for Sir William Borthwick, from whom the castle takes its name,

Panoramic views of the castle can be seen from the Borders Railway between Edinburgh Waverley and Tweedbank railway stations.

== History ==
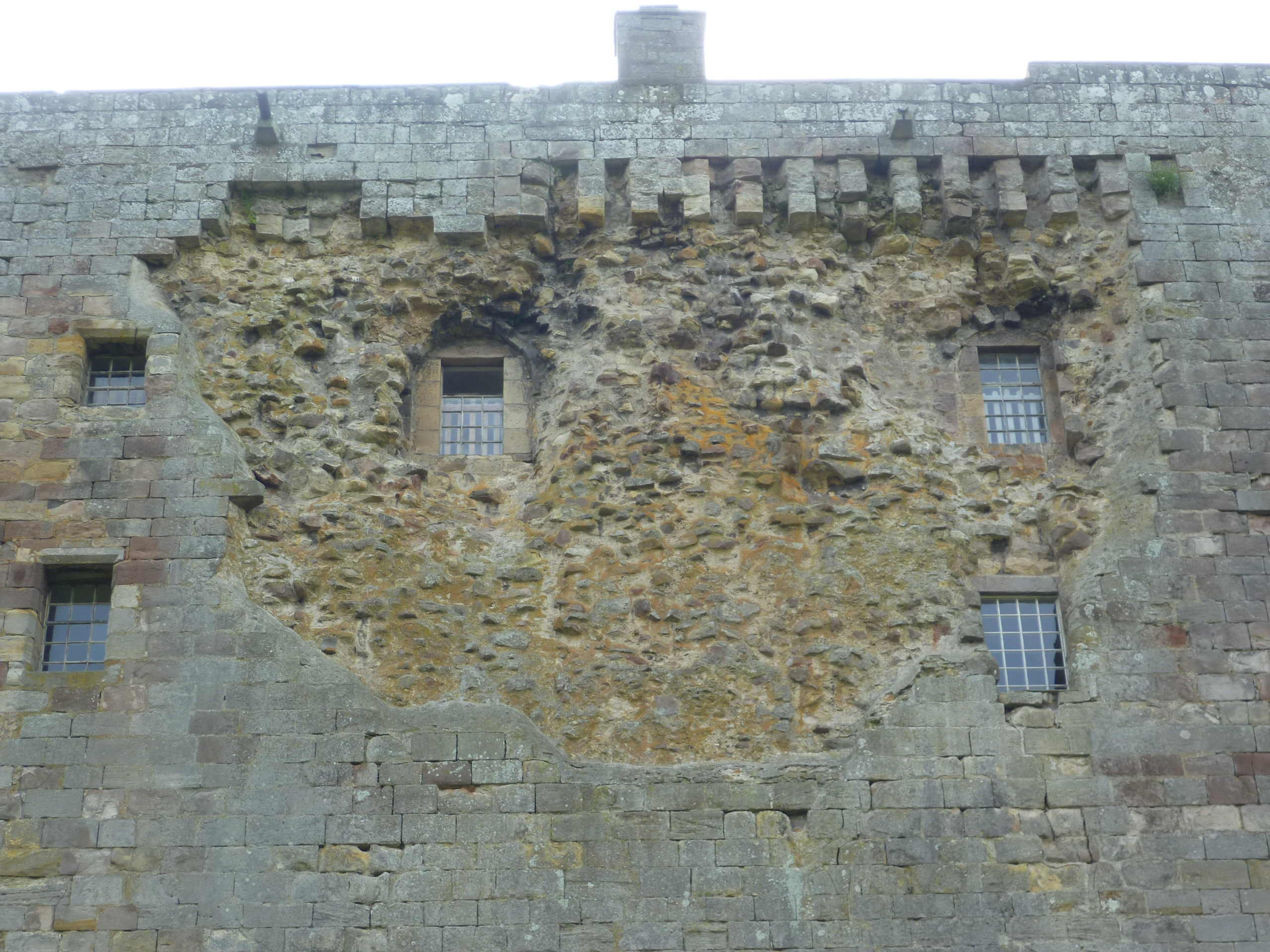
The east wall, damaged in 1650

The castle was built at the site of an earlier structure, and it remains the Borthwick family ancestral seat. Sir William Borthwick, later the 1st Lord, obtained from King James I on 2 June 1430 a licence to erect on the Mote of Locherwart, a castle or fortalice. This was unusual in Scotland as nobles generally did not need to get permission for the building and fortifying of a Castle. He acquired a large part of Locherworth from his neighbour William Hay who was resentful of this and jealous of his neighbour's castle. The well-preserved medieval effigies of the builder and his lady can be seen in the nearby parish kirk of St Kentigern, which retains a 15th-century aisle also probably built by him. It was originally a stone enclosure fortress centring on an unusually tall tower house with walls up to 14 feet (4.3 m) thick and 110 feet (34 m) in height. The design is a 'U-shaped' keep with a 12-foot (3.7 m) gap between the projecting, slightly asymmetrical, towers. There was a surrounding defensive courtyard with round towers pierced with shot-holes at the corners. While the tower house itself is exceptionally well preserved for its date, the surrounding wall and towers are much restored.

In September 1544, John, 5th Lord Borthwick, was captured and held at Dalkeith Castle by George Douglas of Pittendreich. His wife, Isobel Lindsay, Lady Borthwick, invited Patrick Hepburn, 3rd Earl of Bothwell to Borthwick and imprisoned him there until her husband was released in an exchange. A spy told an English officer William Eure that Bothwell came to the castle because "the Lady Borthwick is fair, he came to her for love, but she made him to be handled and kept". Thomas Wharton heard that Bothwell was invited to a newly-built lodging outside the castle at night, where he was taken by Gavin Borthwick. Lord Borthwick was an ally of James Hamilton, Regent of Scotland, and these kidnappings were part of his power struggle with Mary of Guise, the widow of James V, during the war known as the Rough Wooing.

Mary, Queen of Scots visited Borthwick in August 1563 and October 1566. On 15 May 1567 she married James Hepburn, 4th Earl of Bothwell, and in June they came to Borthwick as guests of Lord Borthwick. They were besieged by Lord Home and the laird of Cessford. Bothwell and the young laird of Crookstone secretly left the castle. Bothwell went to Dunbar Castle, but Crookston was captured. William Drury heard that the besiegers shouted insults and Mary replied from the castle. Mary escaped the siege by disguising herself as a male page and met up with Bothwell. Mary was arrested at the battle of Carberry Hill and taken to Lochleven Castle where she was held in captivity. Bothwell fled to Orkney and Shetland, and from there escaped to Norway, which at the time was under Danish rule. His was imprisoned and died in 1578.

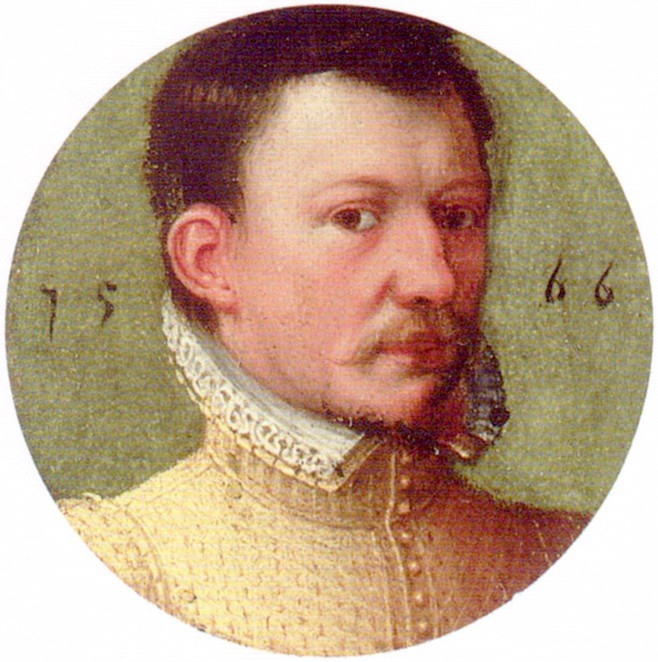
James Hepburn, 4th Earl of Bothwell, husband of Mary, Queen of Scots from 15 May 1567 to his death in 14 April 1578.

In 1650 the Castle was attacked by Oliver Cromwell's forces, and was surrendered after only a few cannon shots. The damage to the walls from this attack is still visible.

After a period of abandonment, the Castle was restored by 1914. During World War II the structure was used as a hiding place to store national treasures. In 1973 it was leased from the Borthwick family and converted into an exclusive hire venue.

In June 2013, the castle closed for extensive refurbishment, and once again opened as an events venue in September 2015.

== Building ==
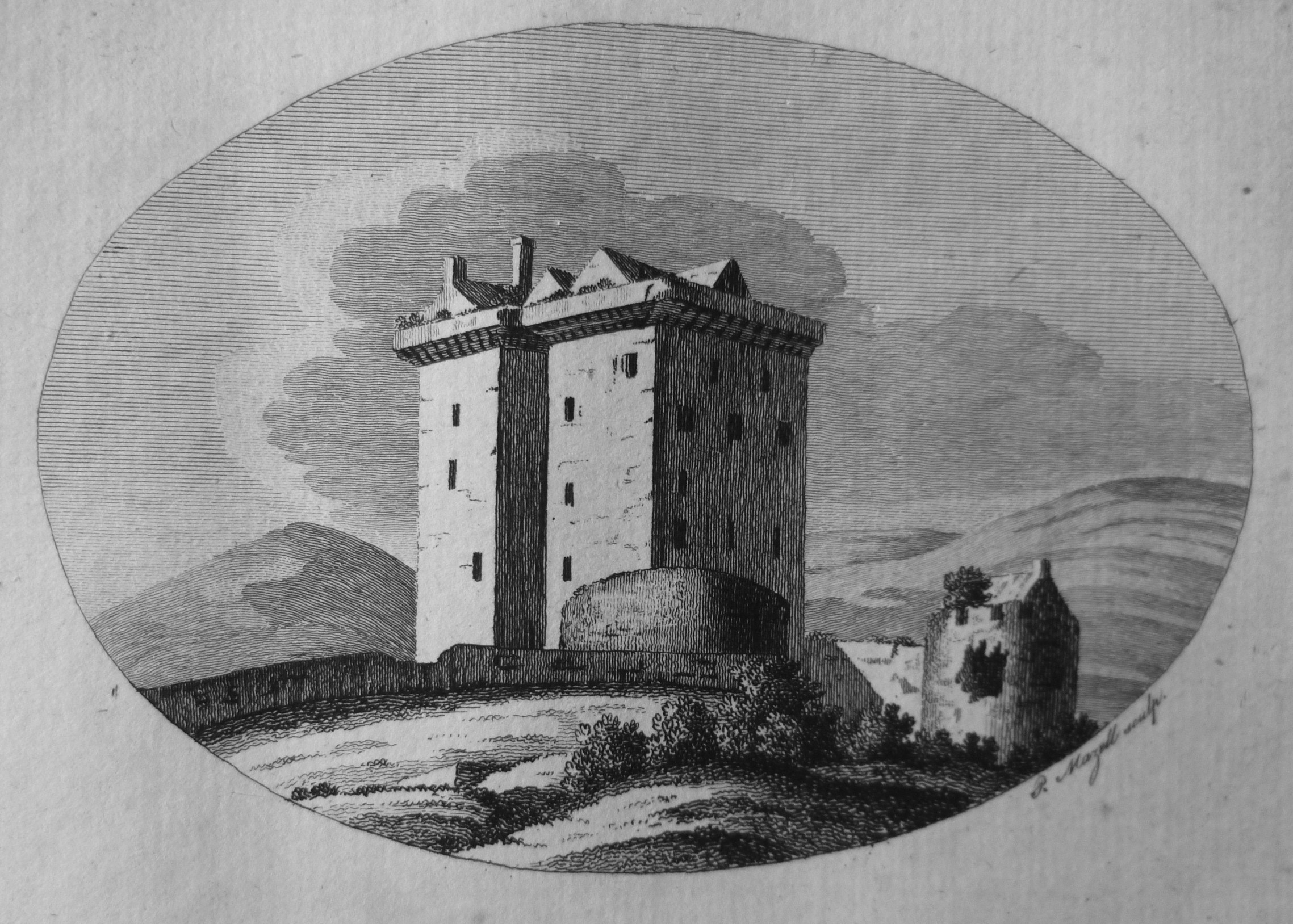
The castle in the late 18th century

Borthwick Castle is built as a double tower, 74 feet (23 m) long, 68 feet (21 m) in breadth and 90 feet (27 m) high. The castle is on a small hill surrounded by a stream. Apart from the large cannon scar on one face, the walls, built of fine sandstone ashlar, are virtually complete, and very unusually, none of the original narrow windows have been enlarged. The battlements, however, no longer survive to their original height, having lost their stepped crenelations. They are carried on massive projecting corbels with corner roundels. The tower has two doorways, both unaltered and round headed. One at ground level leads into the partly subterranean kitchen and storage vaults. The second is directly above it at first-floor level, and leads directly into the stone-vaulted great hall. It is approached by a reconstructed stone bridge.

=== Great Hall ===
The Great hall of Borthwick Castle is 40 feet (12 m) long and of great height. The barrelled Gothic ceiling is painted with pictures of the castle and 'De Temple of Honor' in Gothic characters is visible. The chimney which is also on a large scale is covered by designs.

== Ghostlore ==
Borthwick Castle is the setting for local ghostlore stories, one of which features Mary, Queen of Scots.

== Images ==
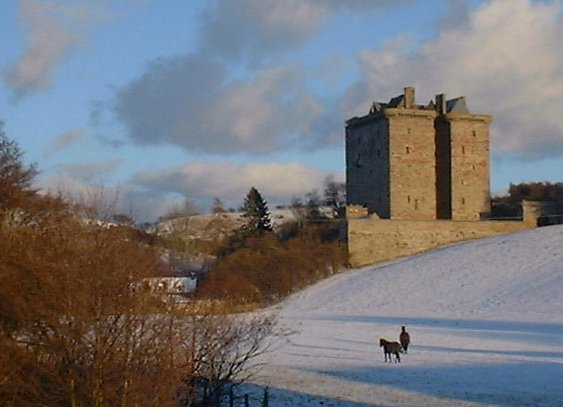

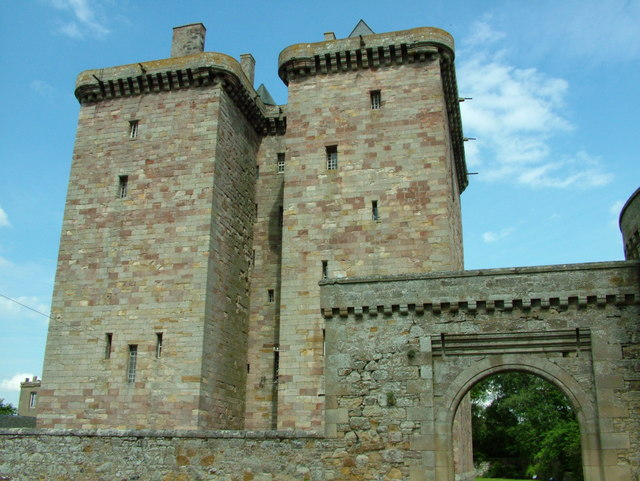

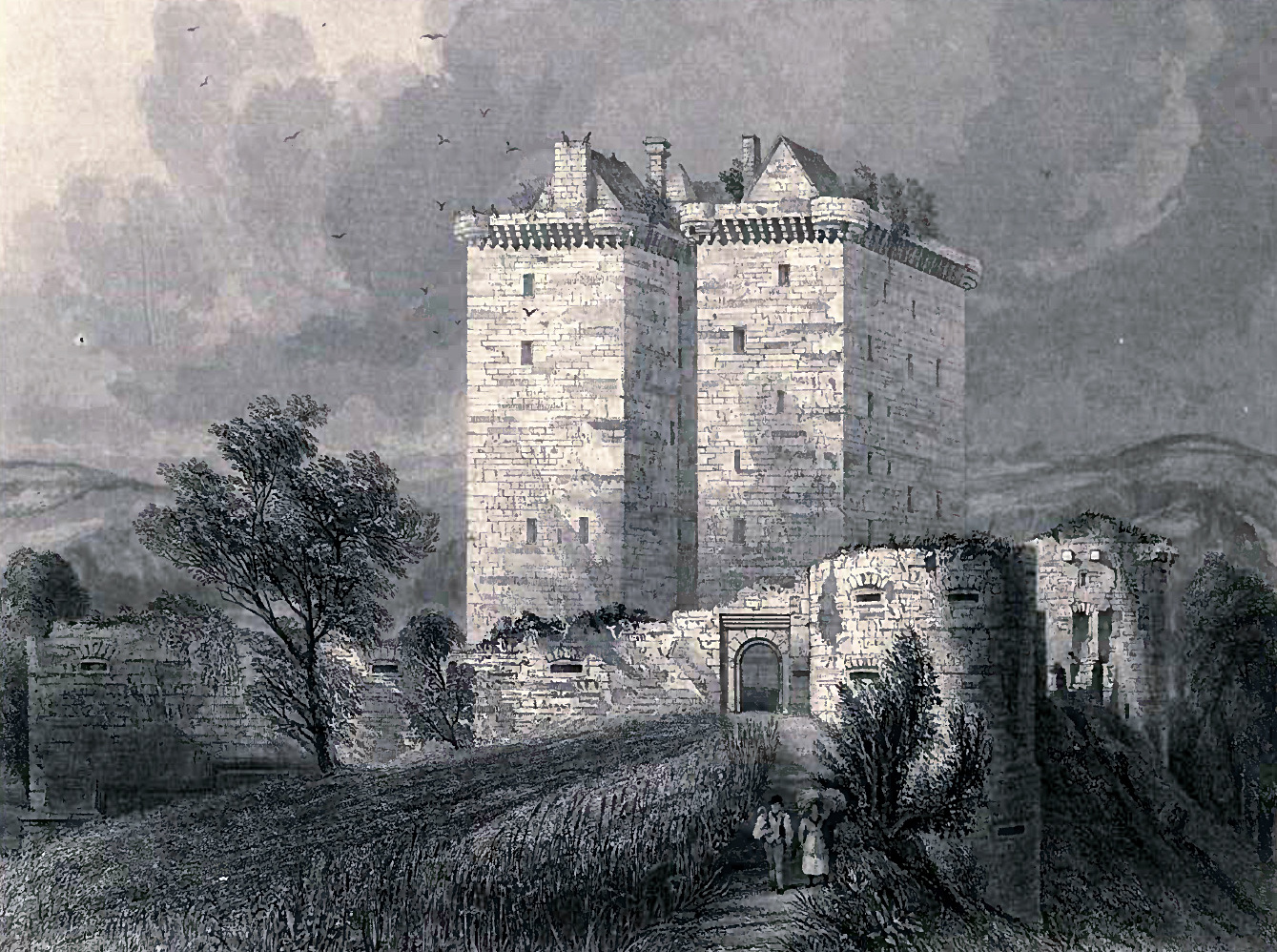
