= William Borthwick, 3rd Lord Borthwick =

Scottish nobleman

Sir William Borthwick, 3rd Lord Borthwick (died 20 May 1503) was a Scottish nobleman, ambassador, and Master of the King's Household in 1485.

The son of William Borthwick, 2nd Lord Borthwick (died c. 1483), the 3rd Lord Borthwick was knighted before his father. As Sir William de Borthwick, Knt, he appeared as defender on behalf of his father in an action of debt on 4 July 1476, when judgement was given against him. They appeared again together in an action on 16 October 1479, and this time had a judgement in their favour.

He was one of the guarantors of the treaty with England dated 20 September 1484, and a Conservator of other treaties on 26 March 1494, 30 September 1497, and 12 July 1499.

William, Lord Borthwick, as superior of the lands of Nenthorn, Berwickshire, granted a charter of them to his second son, Alexander Borthwick, upon the resignation of James Wilson, the previous feuar, on 27 June 1495.

Lord Borthwick died on 20 May 1503, and he was succeeded by his son and heir, William Borthwick, 4th Lord Borthwick. His daughter, Agnes Brothwick, married David Kennedy, 1st Earl of Cassillis. While his other daughter, Catherine Borthwick, married William Cunningham, 4th Earl of Glencairn.

Peerage of Scotland
Preceded by William Borthwick	Lord Borthwick c 1484–1503	Succeeded by William Borthwick
