= John Borthwick (veterinary surgeon) =

South African veterinarian

John Dowie Borthwick
- Born: 31 October 1867; Kirkliston, Scotland
- Died: 18 June 1936 (aged 68); Pretoria, South Africa
- Education: Edinburgh College of Medicine and Veterinary Medicine
- Known for: finding a prophylaxis for lamsiekte in cattle
- Spouse: Elizabeth Edith Walton
- Scientific career
- Fields: veterinary medicine

John Dowie Borthwick (1867–1936) was a veterinary surgeon in the Cape Colony.

== Early life ==
Borthwick was born in Kirkliston, Scotland to John Borthwick (also a vet) and Janet Dowie. He studied veterinary medicine at the Edinburgh College of Medicine and Veterinary Medicine.

== Personal life ==
Borthwick married a descendant of the 1820 Settlers, Elizabeth Edith Walton in Grahamstown on 17 March 1893. The bacteriologist Alexander Edington who was his close colleague witnessed the marriage. He died at his Arcadia North home in Pretoria on 18 June 1936.

== Veterinary work ==
Borthwick began his career in South Africa on 27 March 1889 as the first assistant to Duncan Hutcheon, Colonial Veterinary Surgeon to the Cape of Good Hope. Jotello Festiri Soga the first black South African vet worked with him as Hutcheon's second assistant.

In 1892, he joined Alexander Edington in his laboratory (previously buildings in the Royal Engineers yard (Note: Location of the Royal Engineers' Yard in Grahamstown 33°18′40″S 26°31′10″E)) in Grahamstown. Borthwick served as Edington's assistant in the study of animal diseases until 1893 when he was succeeded by Thomas Bowhill.

Later, he served as Assistant Veterinary Surgeon in various parts of the Cape Colony. In July 1906, he was promoted to the post of Chief Veterinary Surgeon vacated by Hutcheon when the latter was promoted to the post of Director of Agriculture. He then had 16 Assistant Veterinary Surgeons under his control in the Cape.

Borthwick did important work in finding a prophylaxis for lamsiekte in cattle. He found feeding cattle bonemeal prevented the disease. His work was quoted as recently as 2012 by Bigalke.

== Military service ==
During the Boer War he served in the Town Guards and District Mounted Troops.

== Notes and references ==
- Wills, Walter H. (1905). The Anglo-African Who's Who and Biographical Sketchbook, 1905. London: George Routledge and Sons.
- Posthumus, P.J. (Bill) (1990), Past Veterinarians in South Africa (PDF), Pietermaritzburg, p. 57
- Bigalke, Rudolph D. (8 October 2012). "Lamsiekte (botulism): solving the aetiology riddle". Journal of the South African Veterinary Association. 83 (1): 508–512. doi:10.4102/jsava.v83i1.508. PMID 23327122.
- Nuttal, G.H.F. (1904). George H. F. Nuttal (ed.). "Canine Piroplasmosis". The Journal of Hygiene. 4 (2). Cambridge: At the University Press: 219–257. doi:10.1017/s0022172400002151. PMC 2236123. PMID 20474194.
- "Interesting Reports". The Advertiser. Adelaide, South Australia. 12 January 1909. p. 5.
- "Vets Past AB". National Directorate Veterinary Services.
- "Vets Past QRS". National Directorate Veterinary Services. Archived from the original on 8 August 2014.
- Ellen Stanton. "Trinity Presbyterian Parish Records Grahamstown Marriages: 1849-1896". Albany 1820.com.
- "AngloBoerWar.com".
- Biography of John Borthwick at the S2A3 Biographical Database of Southern African Science
