= Jack Borthwick (Australian footballer) =

Australian rules footballer

Personal information
- Full name: John Gerald Borthwick
- Born: 27 August 1884; Melbourne, Victoria
- Died: 21 September 1948 (aged 64); Melbourne, Victoria
- Original team: Footscray (VFA)

Playing career^{1}
Years	Club	Games (Goals)
1906	Essendon	2 (0)
- ^{1} Playing statistics correct to the end of 1906.

Jack Borthwick (27 August 1884 – 21 September 1948) was an Australian rules footballer who played with Essendon in the Victorian Football League (VFL).
