= Jack Borthwick (footballer, born 1886) =

Scottish footballer

Personal information
- Full name: John James Blacklaw Borthwick
- Date of birth: 15 February 1886
- Place of birth: Leith, Scotland
- Date of death: 23 April 1942 (aged 56)
- Place of death: Liverpool, England
- Height: 5 ft 10 3/4 in (1.80 m)
- Position: Centre half

Youth career
- 1902–1903: Royal Oak
- 1903–1904: Edinburgh Clifton
- 1904–1905: Wemyss Violet
- 1905–1906: Lochgelly United

Senior career*
Years	Team	Apps	(Gls)
1906–1908	Hibernian	30	(0)
1908–1911	Everton	25	(0)
1911–1914	Millwall Athletic		
1914–1915	East Fife		
1915	Cowdenbeath		
1916	Hibernian		
- * Club domestic league appearances and goals

John James Blacklaw Borthwick (15 February 1886 – 23 April 1942) was a Scottish professional footballer who played as a centre half in the Football League for Everton. He also played in the Scottish League for Hibernian.

== Personal life ==
Borthwick's younger brother Watty also became a footballer and his son Bill worked as a trainer for Everton. Borthwick served as a private in the Football Battalion of the Middlesex Regiment during the First World War and suffered a gunshot wound to the head at Delville Wood in 1916. He described his injuries in a letter to Bert Lipsham: "my head has been trepanned, as the skull was knocked in. The cut extends from nearly the top of my head down to my eyebrow. It was a near thing of losing my right eye". Borthwick was discharged on 12 April 1917. After his retirement from football, he ran the Winslow Hotel, opposite Goodison Park.

== Career statistics ==
Appearances and goals by club, season and competition
Club	Season	League			National Cup		Total	
Club	Season	Division	Apps	Goals	Apps	Goals	Apps	Goals
Hibernian	1906–07	Scottish Division One	2	0	0	0	2	0
Hibernian	1907–08	Scottish Division One	28	0	3	1	31	1
Hibernian	Total		30	0	3	1	33	1
Everton	1907–08	First Division	1	0	0	0	1	0
Everton	1908–09	First Division	1	0	0	0	1	0
Everton	1909–10	First Division	19	0	0	0	19	0
Everton	1910–11	First Division	4	0	0	0	4	0
Everton	Total		25	0	0	0	25	0
Career total			55	0	3	1	58	1
