= William Borthwick, 4th Lord Borthwick =

Scottish nobleman

William Borthwick, 4th Lord Borthwick (died 1542) was a Scottish nobleman.

He succeeded his father William Borthwick, 3rd Lord Borthwick in 1503.

Lord Borthwick inherited a tenement on the south side of Edinburgh's High Street divided into several "lands", and one land was occupied by the merchant James Hommyll. The four African people known as the "More lasses" stayed with Hommyll in November 1504.

After the battle of Flodden, in November 1513 Lord Borthwick was appointed by the Margaret Tudor and the Privy Council of Scotland to the command of Stirling Castle, which was ordered to be well fortified, and the custody of the infant monarch King James V of Scotland and his younger brother Alexander Stewart, Duke of Ross.

The seal of William, Lord Borthwick, appears on the treaty signed with England on 7 October 1517.

== Marriage and family ==
In 1491 Lord Borthwick married Margaret Hay, eldest daughter of John Hay, 1st Lord Hay of Yester. Their children included:

- Thomas, Master of Borthwick (d. 1528). Died without issue.
- John Borthwick, 5th Lord Borthwick (d. March 1566), married Isobel Lindsay. He was imprisoned at Dalkeith Castle in 1544, and was later a Privy Counsellor who opposed the Scottish Reformation.
- Catherine, (eldest daughter), married Sir James Crichton of Frendraught.
- Jonette, married in 1535, Sir Alexander Lauder of Hatton, who was killed at the battle of Pinkie.
- Margaret, married Sir John Borthwick of Cineray (who died bef. December 1570), "of obscure origins ... not, as has been claimed, a son of William, third Lord Borthwick"-

Peerage of Scotland
Preceded by William Borthwick	Lord Borthwick; 1503–1542	Succeeded by John Borthwick
