= William Borthwick, 1st Lord Borthwick =

Scottish peer and ambassador (1413-1483)

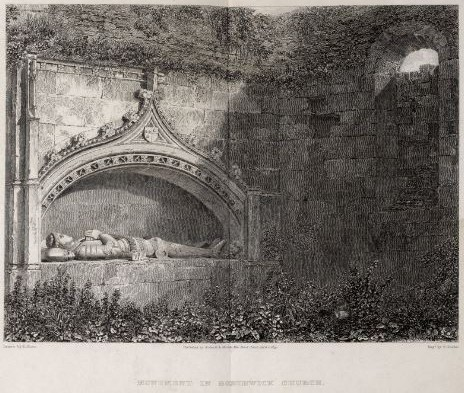
The first Lord Borthwick at rest in Borthwick Kirk

Sir William Borthwick, 3rd of Borthwick and later 1st Lord Borthwick (c. 1413 – October 1483) was a Scottish peer and ambassador.

Borthwick was the eldest son of Sir William Borthwick, 2nd of Borthwick, castellan of Edinburgh (Sir William Borthwick of that Ilk), and his wife Bethoc (or Beatrice) Sinclair of Orkney, daughter of Henry Sinclair, 1st Earl of Orkney. His paternal grandmother was a daughter of Sir Thomas Hay of Lochorwart.

He accompanied Henry, Bishop of Aberdeen, William, Bishop of Dunblane, John, Abbot of Melrose, James, Prior of St. Andrews, John, Abbot of 'Balmurynach', Sir William de Hay, knight, Master Thomas de Myrton, Master Edward de Lawedre, and Master John Stenes, all as Scots' ambassadors, with 50 attendants, setting out for the Court of Rome. The Safe-conduct is dated 9 June 1425 and is given until the following Easter.

Borthwick was sent in 1424 as hostage in England in the place of James I. He was knighted in 1430 at the baptism of Alexander and James, the twin sons of King James I.

In either 1424, 1438 or 12 June 1452 he was raised to the Peerage of Scotland as a Lord of Parliament with the title Lord Borthwick.

He built Borthwick Castle in 1430.

He sat in the Parliament of Scotland under the title Lord Borthwick in 1455.

Since the date of the first Lord Borthwick’s death is unknown, it cannot be stated with certainty whether he or his son, also William Borthwick, was the Scottish ambassador to England in 1459, 1461, 1463, and 1464–65.

He is said to be buried with his wife in Borthwick Kirk.

== Family ==
Lord Borthwick was married three times and had issue:

By his first wife, name unknown:

- Agnes

By his second wife, Mariotta Hoppringle:

- James Borthwick, d. before 1494
- Sir Thomas Borthwick, d. after 1503
- Alexander Borthwick, d. after 1513

By his third wife, name unknown:

- Sir William Borthwick, 2nd Lord Borthwick, died between 1483 and 1484
- John Borthwick, 1st of Crookston, died c. 1459
- Margaret Borthwick, m. Sir John Maxwell of Calderwood

The 1st Lord Borthwick was succeeded by his son and heir William.

His son John Borthwick, acquired the lands of Crookston, Midlothian, in 1446.

Peerage of Scotland
New creation	Lord Borthwick ca. 1452 – ca. 1470	Succeeded by William Borthwick
