= Borthwick baronets =

Set index for Borthwick baronets

There have been two baronetcies created for persons with the surname Borthwick, both in the Baronetage of the United Kingdom.

- Borthwick baronets of Heath House (1887): see Baron Glenesk
- Borthwick baronets of Whitburgh (1908)
