= Lord Borthwick =

Title in the Peerage of Scotland

Lordship of Borthwick
- Creation date: 12 June 1452
- Created by: King James II of Scotland
- Peerage: Peerage of Scotland
- First holder: William Borthwick
- Present holder: James Henry Alexander Borthwick, 25th Lord Borthwick
- Heir apparent: Hon. Malcolm Henry Borthwick, Master of Borthwick
- Remainder to: the 1st Lord's heirs male of the body lawfully begotten.
- Subsidiary titles: Hereditary Royal Falconer of Scotland; Chief of the Name and Arms of Borthwick

Lord Borthwick is a title in the Peerage of Scotland.

Alexander Nisbet relates that "the first of this ancient and noble family came from Hungary to Scotland, in the retinue of Queen Margaret, in the reign of Malcolm Canmore, anno Domini 1057. A Thomas de Borthwick is mentioned in a charter of Sir Robert Lauder of Quarrelwood, in the reign of King Alexander II."

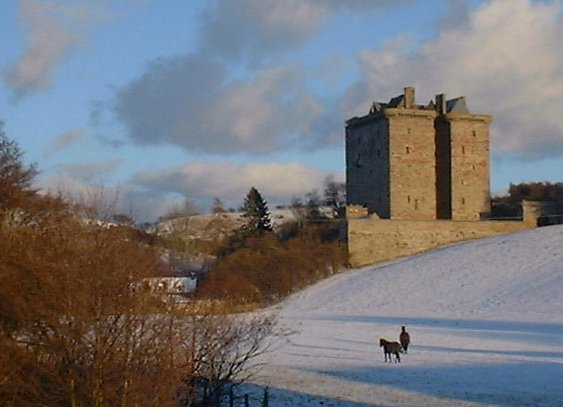
Borthwick Castle, the ancient seat of the Borthwick family.

Sir William de Borthwick of that Ilk was created a Lord of Parliament as Lord Borthwick, (William Borthwick, 1st Lord Borthwick), but it is unclear exactly when the title was created. Nisbet states: "there appears no patent in the records constituting this peerage".

Anderson supposes it dates from "about 1424", Brown says 1438, Leeson gives 1452, and Burke's and Pine actually give an exact date: June 12, 1452. However, Alexander Nisbet, writing as far back as 1722 states: "this family was dignified with the title of Lord Borthwick in the beginning of the reign of King James II" which commenced in 1437, which is closer to Brown's assertion.

In the Parliament of 1469 held at Edinburgh by King James III of Scotland Lord Borthwick was ranked after the Lord Halyburton (cr.1441). In the parliament of 1471 he is the fourth Lord of Parliament ranked immediately after the Lord Glamis (cr.1445).

The chronology of the Lords Borthwick also presents problems as of the first seven, six were named William. Of the first Lord, Burke's (1999) merely states: "knighted before his father in 1430; one of the magnates who according to contemporary records habitually plundered the Customs. Married and left issue". Anderson states "the first Lord Borthwick died before 1458".

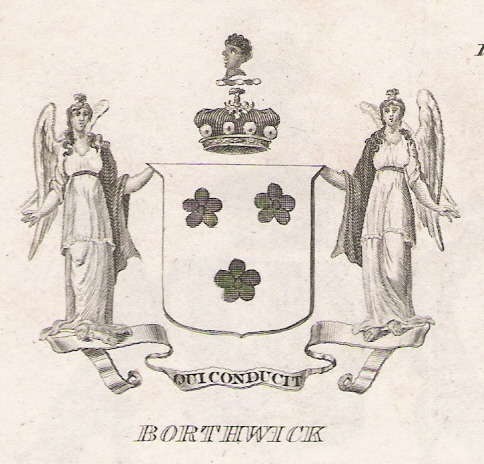
Arms as shown in Brown's Peerage of Scotland, 1834

His son, the second Lord (William Borthwick, 2nd Lord Borthwick), was an ambassador to England as well as Master of the Household to King James III. He was succeeded by his son, the third Lord (William Borthwick, 3rd Lord Borthwick), who some say was one of the many Scottish noblemen killed at the Battle of Flodden in 1513 although the Complete Peerage cited by Pine stated "this was unlikely". His son, the fourth Lord (William Borthwick, 4th Lord Borthwick), became guardian to the infant King James V.

The ninth Lord, was a Royalist during the Wars of the Three Kingdoms. However, on his death in 1675 the male line of the third Lord failed. The Borthwick estates passed to his nephew John Dundas, son of his sister Margaret Borthwick, while the lordship became dormant.

It was to remain dormant for the next 87 years. The right to the title, however, passed to the late Lord's kinsman and male heir William Borthwick, the de jure tenth Lord. He was the son of William Borthwick, 5th of Soltray (Soutra) and Johnstonburn, elder son of William Borthwick, 4th of Soltray and Johnstonburn, great-grandson of William Borthwick, 1st of Soltray, son of the Hon. Alexander Borthwick, third son of the second Lord Borthwick. He never assumed the title.

His son, the de jure eleventh Lord, was a colonel in the army and was killed at the Battle of Ramillies in 1706. On his death the right to the lordship passed to his cousin Henry Borthwick, the de jure twelfth Lord. He was the grandson of Alexander Borthwick, younger son of the aforementioned William Borthwick, 4th of Soltray and Johnstonburn. Henry was a captain in the Scottish army and like his cousin fought at the Battle of Ramillies. He died from wounds received in action four days after the battle (and four days after his cousin). On his death the right to the lordship passed to his elder son William, de jure thirteenth Lord, and then to his younger brother Henry. The latter's claim to the title was admitted by the House of Lords in 1762, and he became the fourteenth Lord Borthwick. However, on his death in 1772 the peerage became dormant again.

The claim now passed to the late Lord's kinsman and male heir Patrick Borthwick, the de jure fifteenth Lord. He was the great-grandson of Alexander Borthwick, 1st of Reidhall and Sauchnell, younger son of William Borthwick, 3rd of Soltray and Johnstonburne, grandson of William Borthwick, 1st of Soltray, cited above. His son Archibald, the de jure sixteenth Lord, petitioned the House of Lords for the right to claim the title in 1808 but was unsuccessful. His son Patrick, de jure seventeenth Lord, was also unsuccessful when he tried to claim the title in 1816. However, his younger son Cunninghame had his claim to the lordship allowed by the House of Lords in 1870 and he became the nineteenth Lord Borthwick. From 1880 to 1885 he sat in the House of Lords as a Scottish Representative Peer. He married Alice Day, their eldest daughter was Gabrielle Borthwick, their son, the twentieth Lord, was a Scottish Representative Peer between 1906 and 1910. When he died in 1910 the peerage once again became dormant.

The claim passed to his distant relative William Henry Borthwick, the de jure twenty-first Lord. He was a descendant of John Borthwick, 1st of Crookston, younger son of the first Lord. His grandson John Henry Stuart Borthwick had his claim to the title admitted by the Lord Lyon in 1986, and he became the twenty-third Lord Borthwick. As of 2025 this ancient title is held by his younger twin son, the twenty-fifth Lord Borthwick, who succeeded his brother in that year. He is Chief of Clan Borthwick and also holds the baronage title Baron of Heriotmuir and Laird of Crookston.

The family seat is Borthwick Castle, near Borthwick, Midlothian but is leased as a venue for hire by the family.

== Coat of arms ==
The heraldic blazon for the coat of arms of the lordship is: Argent, three cinquefoils sable.

== Lords Borthwick (1452) ==
- William Borthwick, 1st Lord Borthwick (died 1484)
- William Borthwick, 2nd Lord Borthwick (died 1513)
- William Borthwick, 3rd Lord Borthwick (died 1543)
- John Borthwick, 4th Lord Borthwick (died 1566)
- William Borthwick, 5th Lord Borthwick (died 1582)
- James Borthwick, 6th Lord Borthwick (1570–1599)
- John Borthwick, 7th Lord Borthwick (died 1623)
- John Borthwick, 8th Lord Borthwick (1616–1675) (dormant 1675)
- William Borthwick, 9th of Crookston de jure 9th Lord Borthwick (<1657–<1681)
- John Borthwick, 10th of Crookston de jure 10th Lord Borthwick (1668–1743)
- John Borthwick, 11th of Crookston de jure 11th Lord Borthwick (1710–1794)
- John Borthwick, 12th of Crookston de jure 12th Lord Borthwick (1762–1830)
- John Borthwick, 13th of Crookston de jure 13th Lord Borthwick (1788–1845)
- John Borthwick, 14th of Crookston de jure 14th Lord Borthwick (1824–1907)
- William Henry Borthwick, 15th of Crookston de jure 15th Lord Borthwick (1832–1928)
- Henry Borthwick, 16th of Crookston de jure 16th Lord Borthwick (1868–1937)
- John Henry Stuart Borthwick, 17th of Crookston de jure 17th Lord Borthwick (1905–1996) referred to as 23rd Lord Borthwick in 1986 decision
- John Hugh Borthwick, 18th of Crookston de jure 18th Lord Borthwick (1940–2025)
- James Henry Alexander Borthwick, 19th of Crookston de jure 19th Lord Borthwick (born 1940)

== Lords Borthwick (1452) as determined before 1986 decision ==
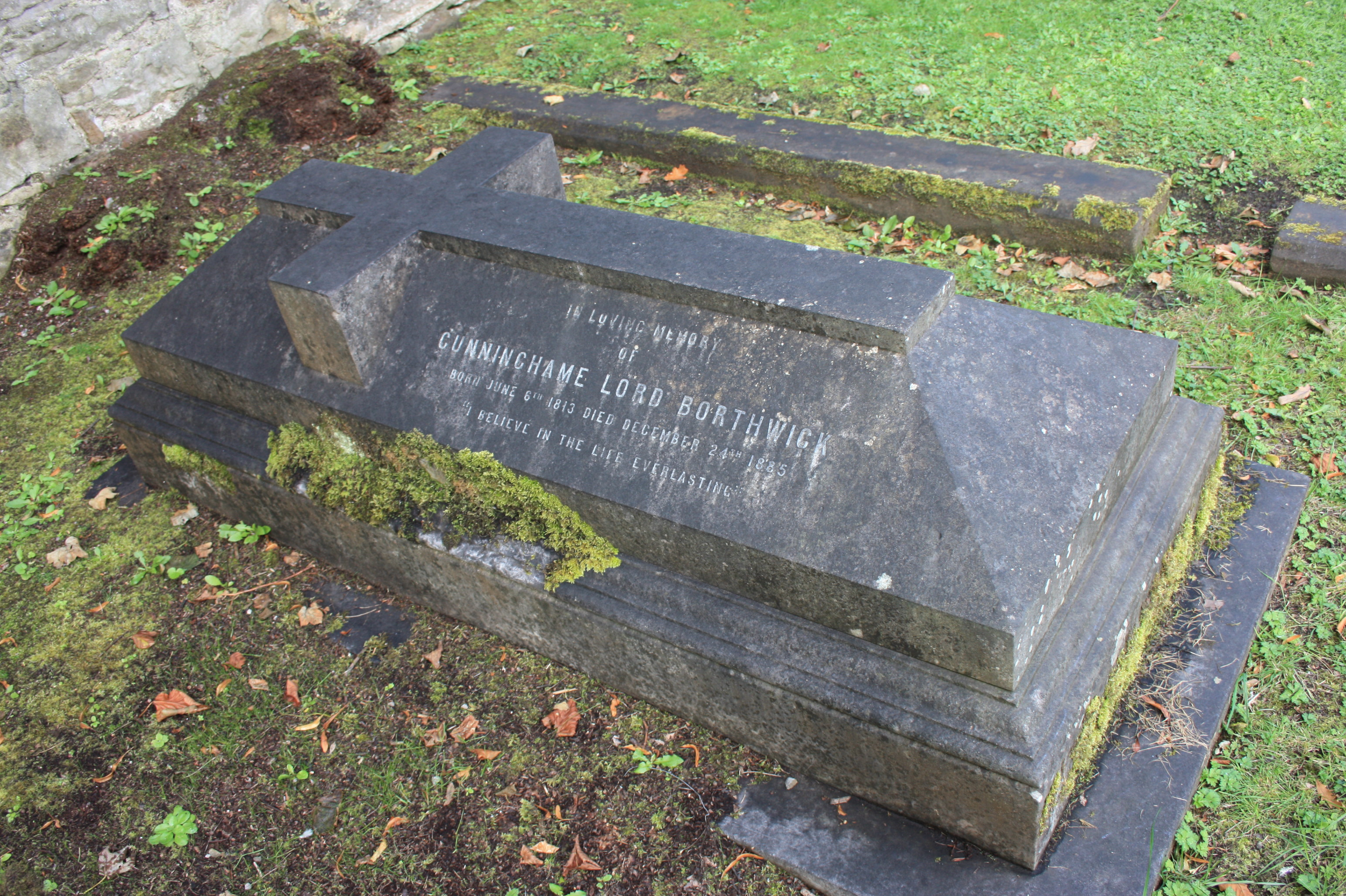
The grave of Cunninghame, 19th Lord Borthwick, Dean Cemetery, Edinburgh

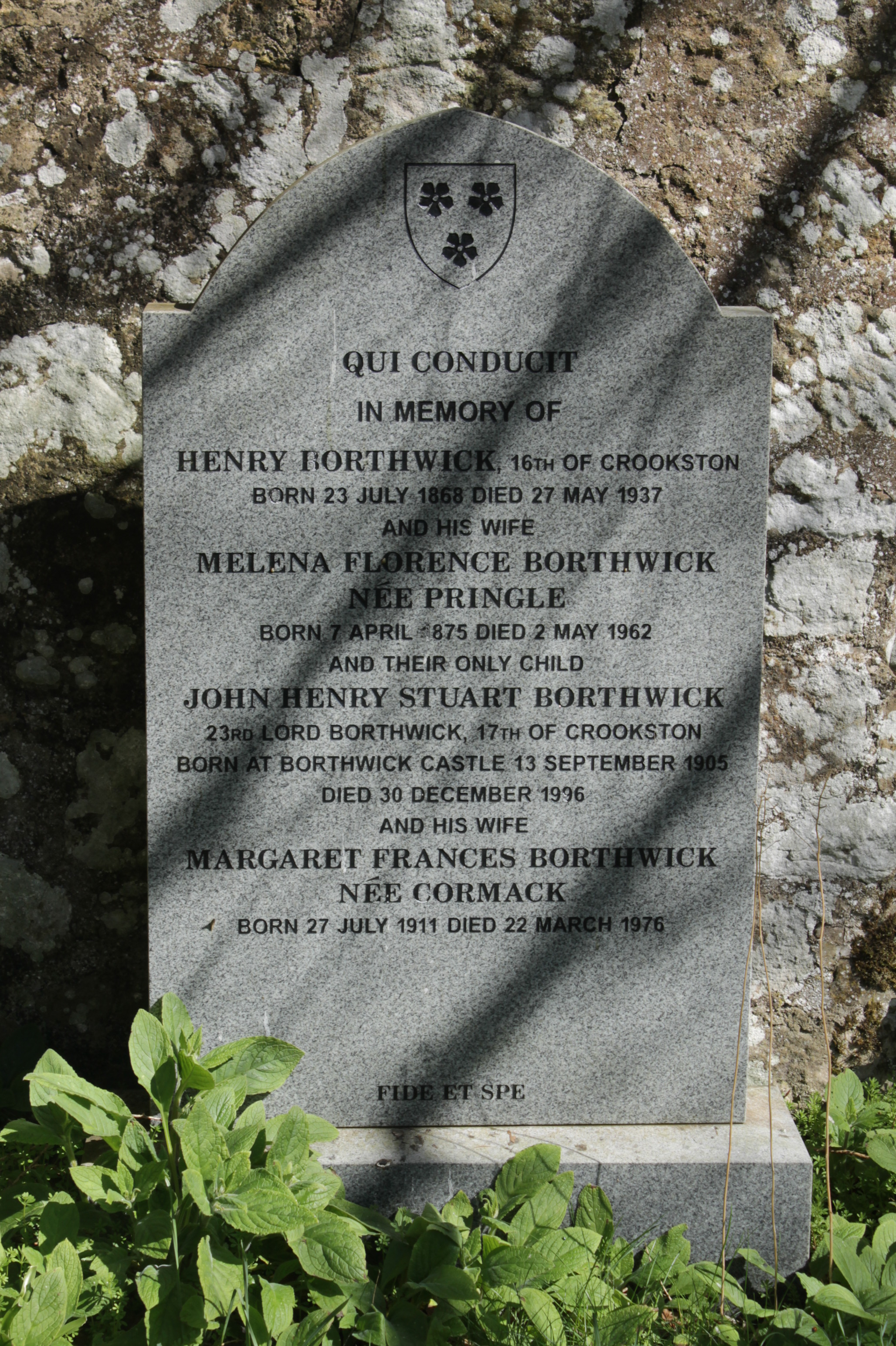
The grave of Henry Borthwick, 22nd Lord Borthwick, Borthwick Parish Church

- William Borthwick, 1st Lord Borthwick (d. 1470)
- William Borthwick, 2nd Lord Borthwick (d. 1484)
- William Borthwick, 3rd Lord Borthwick (d. 1513)
- William Borthwick, 4th Lord Borthwick (d. 1543)
- John Borthwick, 5th Lord Borthwick (d. 1566)
- William Borthwick, 6th Lord Borthwick (d. 1582)
- James Borthwick, 7th Lord Borthwick (1570–1599)
- John Borthwick, 8th Lord Borthwick (d. 1623)
- John Borthwick, 9th Lord Borthwick (1616–1675) (dormant 1675)
- William Borthwick, de jure 10th Lord Borthwick (d. 1690)
- William Borthwick, de jure 11th Lord Borthwick (1666–1706)
- Henry Borthwick, de jure 12th Lord Borthwick (d. 1706)
- William Borthwick, de jure 13th Lord Borthwick (d. 1723)
- Henry Borthwick, 14th Lord Borthwick (d. 1772) (confirmed in title 1762; dormant 1772)
- Patrick Borthwick, de jure 15th Lord Borthwick (d. 1772)
- Archibald Borthwick, de jure 16th Lord Borthwick (1732–1815)
- Patrick Borthwick, de jure 17th Lord Borthwick (1779–1840)
- Archibald Borthwick, de jure 18th Lord Borthwick (1811–1863)
- Cunninghame Borthwick, 19th Lord Borthwick (1813–1885) (confirmed in title 1870)
- Archibald Patrick Thomas Borthwick, 20th Lord Borthwick (1867–1910) (dormant 1910)
- William Henry Borthwick, de jure 21st Lord Borthwick (1832–1928)
- Henry Borthwick, de jure 22nd Lord Borthwick (1868–1937)
- John Henry Stuart Borthwick, 23rd Lord Borthwick (1905–1996) (confirmed in title 1986)
- John Hugh Borthwick, 24th Lord Borthwick (1940-2025)
- James Henry Alexander Borthwick, 25th Lord Borthwick (b. 1940)

The heir apparent is his only son Malcolm Henry Borthwick, Master of Borthwick (b. 1973)

== Notes ==
- Kidd, Charles, ed. (1903). Debrett's peerage, baronetage, knightage, and companionage. London: Dean and son. p. 158.
- Leigh Rayment's Peerage Pages
