= John David Borthwick =

British writer (1824–1892)

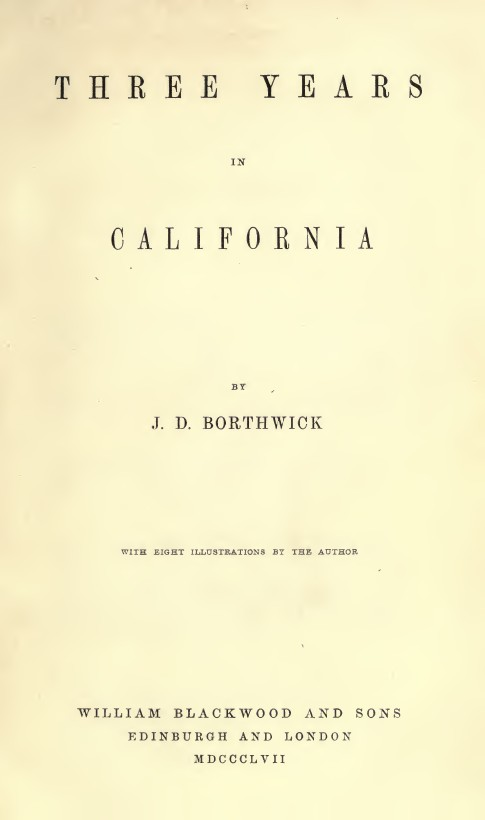
Borthwick's Three Years in California (1857)

John David Borthwick (1824–1892), born in Edinburgh, Scotland, to a prominent physician, was a nomadic Scottish journalist and author who received both a gentleman's and artist's education. In 1845, an inheritance was settled on him, and when he turned 21, he set out to see the world. It is also speculated that he was one of the sons of Peter Borthwick, a descendant of Baron Borthwick, but there is no evidence to substantiate this claim.

== Work and life ==
Borthwick traveled in Canada in 1847, south to New Orleans, and then northwards as far as New York, where he lived for some time, until he was struck with gold fever in May 1850, and quickly moved to California. He crossed the Isthmus of Panama at Chagres on a small sailing ship from Panama City, where he stayed until the spring of 1851, reaching San Francisco in the summer of that year. He traveled in gold rush California from 1851 to 1854, eagerly observing and sketching every ethnic group he met.

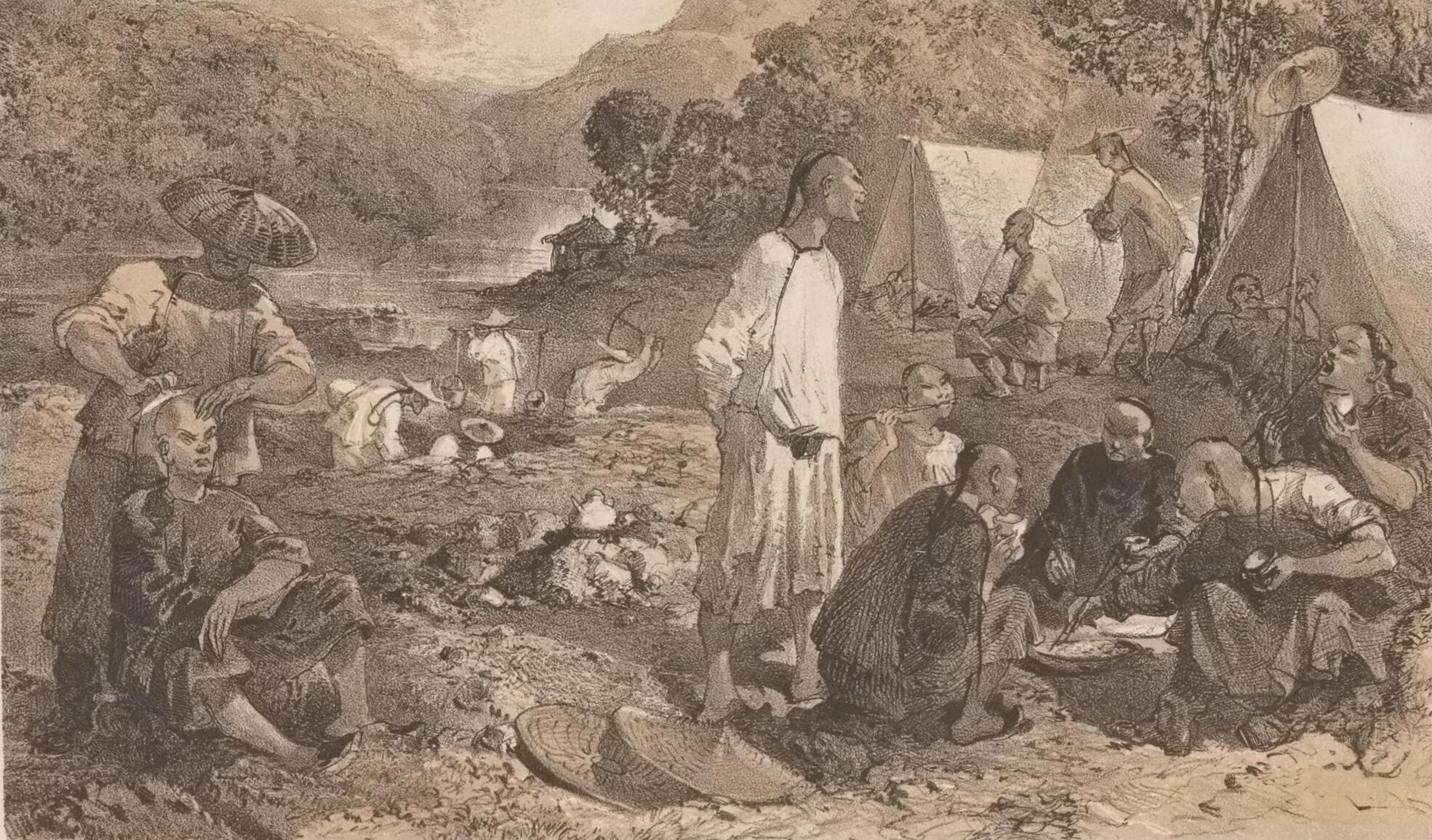
A lithograph of a typical 19th century Chinese-American mining camp

In 1853, he left for Nicaragua on his way to the Atlantic seaboard, then to Australia, and finally to Scotland via Panama in 1856. That year, Borthwick returned to Edinburgh and began organizing his notes for publication, and his paintings were exhibited in several galleries, including the Royal Academy.

In 1857, he published materials from his California travels in Harper's Weekly, in California Magazine, and the reminiscence of his adventures in a book called Three Years in California. This book, which offers descriptions of mining techniques, personal interactions, transportation, crime, holidays, hotels and restaurants, entertainment of the social life of the era and the growth of California. It focused on his experiences and encounters in gold camps such as Sacramento, Coloma, Nevada City, Placerville, Downieville, Jacksonville, San Andreas and Sonora. It is considered one of the most entertaining and accurate depictions of the early Gold Rush period, and remains one of the classic first-person accounts of the Age of Gold in America. Borthwick illustrated his book with eight of his own lithographs, depicting card games, dances, mining operations, and Chinese emigrants. His attention to detail and his engaging portrayals are considered one of the most realistic representations of the time.

From 1857 until his death in 1892 Borthwick resided in the Paddington district of London.

== Borthwick's gambling kit ==
In 2010 a traveling gambling kit that belonged to Borthwick was featured on the History television show Pawn Stars. An expert deemed it authentic and to the period, estimating its value at somewhere between $7,000 to $10,000. The owner of the kit decided not to sell the item after learning this. However, the kit included some items which post-date Borthwick's known time in America, viz. royal flush artwork (not a feature of poker until the 1870s) and an 1880 revolver. The Pawn Stars episode also referred to Borthwick as a professional gambler, but there is no evidence that he ever pursued gambling as a livelihood, and erroneously described his books as being about gambling.

== Publications ==
- "Quartz Mining in California" (Hutching's California Magazine vol. II, no. 4, October 1857).
- The Gold Hunters (1857)
- A First-hand Picture Of Life in California
- "Gold in California" (Illustrated London News, 24 January 1852)
- "Mining Life in California" (Harper's Weekly, 3 October 1857)
- Mining Camps in the Early Fifties
- JD Borthwick "Sees the Elephant"
- Looking for Gold
- Miner's Laws
- Gold is Where You Find It
- On Gambling in San Francisco

=== Reprints ===
- The Outing Library reprinted Three Years in California in 1917, with an introduction by Horace Kephart. The Outing Library edition was reprinted in 1929 by International Fiction Library, and Joseph A. Sullivan's Biobooks brought out a new edition in 1948 that was limited to 1,000 copies and included a foldout map of Borthwick's travels. A number of more recent editions and facsimiles are currently available.

== See also ==
- Lithography
