= Caher =

Caher is an Anglicised form of the Irish language word cathair (meaning "stone ringfort") and may refer to: Caher

== Historical ==
- Cathair, a general term for a stone ringfort in Ireland

== Places ==
Anglicised forms of many Irish place-names, such as

- Caher Island an uninhabited island off the coast of County Mayo.
- Cahir (sometimes spelled Caher) a town in South Tipperary in Ireland.
- Several historic Electoral divisions in Ireland - including places named "Caher" in Clare, Cork, Kerry, Queen's County (Laois), and Tipperary:
  - In County Clare, Scarriff SRD, several townlands named Caher in Ogonnelloe civil parish in Tulla Lower barony and in Feakle civil parish in Tulla Upper barony.
  - In County Cork (East Riding section), SRD Youghal, a townland named Caher in Mogeely civil parish in Kinnatalloon barony.
  - In County Cork (West Riding section), six townlands in six separate SRDs and DEDs.
  - In County Kerry, three townlands in three separate SRDs and DEDs.
  - In County Laois (Queens), two townlands, both in the civil parish of Offerlane in Upperwoods barony, Abbeyleix SRD, Caher DED.
  - In County Tipperary (South Riding section), a civil parish (containing Caher Town) in Iffa and Offa West barony, Clogheen SRD, Caher DED.

== Geographical ==
- Caher Mountain (Kerry) (1,000 metres), the third highest peak in Ireland; part of the MacGillycuddy's Reeks range.
- Caher Mountain (Cork) (338 metres), a hill near Kilcrohane in County Cork, Ireland
