= Siege of Cahir Castle =

Siege during the Nine Years' War in Ireland

- Part of the Nine Years' War
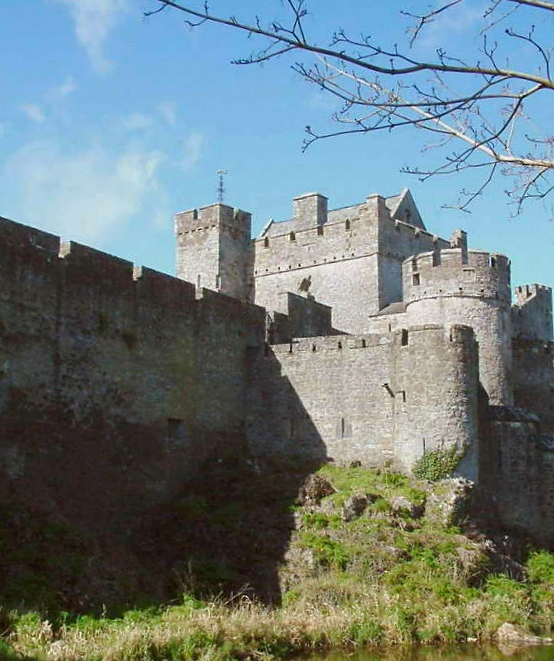
- Cahir Castle
Date	26–29 May 1599
Location	Cahir Castle, County Tipperary
Result	English victory: Crown forces take the castle

Belligerents
(Kingdom of England) England	Irish alliance

Commanders and leaders
Earl of Essex	James Galdie Butler

Strength
4,000–5,000	Several hundred in garrison 5,000 more in the vicinity

Casualties and losses
Low	80–100 killed

The siege of Cahir Castle took place in Munster, in southern Ireland in 1599, during the campaign of the Earl of Essex against the rebels in the Nine Years War (1595-1603). Although the castle was considered the strongest fortress in the country, Essex took it after only a few days of artillery bombardment. However, Queen Elizabeth dismissed her commander's achievement, claiming the defenders were merely a "rabble of rogues".

== Campaign ==
In April 1599 Essex landed at Dublin with the largest army ever seen in Ireland (16,000 troops and 1,300 horse). He avoided confrontation with the northern rebels under Hugh O'Neill and chose instead to settle the southern part of the country, which was most susceptible to Spanish interference at a time when England feared another Armada expedition. In the course of a controversial, and largely wasteful, tour of the province of Munster he secured the surrender of Derrinlaur Castle before fixing his sights on the greater prize of Cahir Castle farther up the river Suir.

For any force hoping to penetrate westward from the Suir and deep into rebel country the suppression of the Barons of Cahir and their stronghold of Cahir castle was a necessity. The castle stood on a rock in the middle of the river and was considered impregnable by its situation, with its large keep enjoying the protection of six stout towers and thick curtain walls.

At the time the castle was the property of the Irish nobleman, Thomas Butler, 4th Baron Cahir, and in the custody of his brother, James Galdie ("the Englishman"). Before the capture of Derrinlaur Castle, Essex had accused Cahir of colluding with the rebel White Knight. But as the English army prepared to march from the riverside town of Clonmel, Cahir gave assurances that James Galdie would surrender the castle as soon as they came in view.

== Siege ==
On the morning of 25 May, Essex divided the army into three battles, the vanguard to lead and the main battle to assemble on the fair green a mile outside Clonmel. Artillery (a cannon and a culverin) was brought by water into the quay under Essex's supervision. With the protection of the rearguard and a troop of horse, the guns were dragged by hand the 10 miles to Cahir (for want of draught horses), in poor weather over bridges that groaned under their weight. Essex rode ahead with the army and overtook the vanguard; they stopped a mile short of the castle and waited for the artillery.

Lord Cahir was sent ahead (with Henry Danvers, lieutenant general of the horse) to call on his brother to surrender and allow an English garrison to enter; he was answered with threats and insults by those who came out to parley with him, and was then accused by Essex of breach of faith. He proposed a further parley, but Essex was determined to capture the castle, and Cahir and his wife were placed under guard.

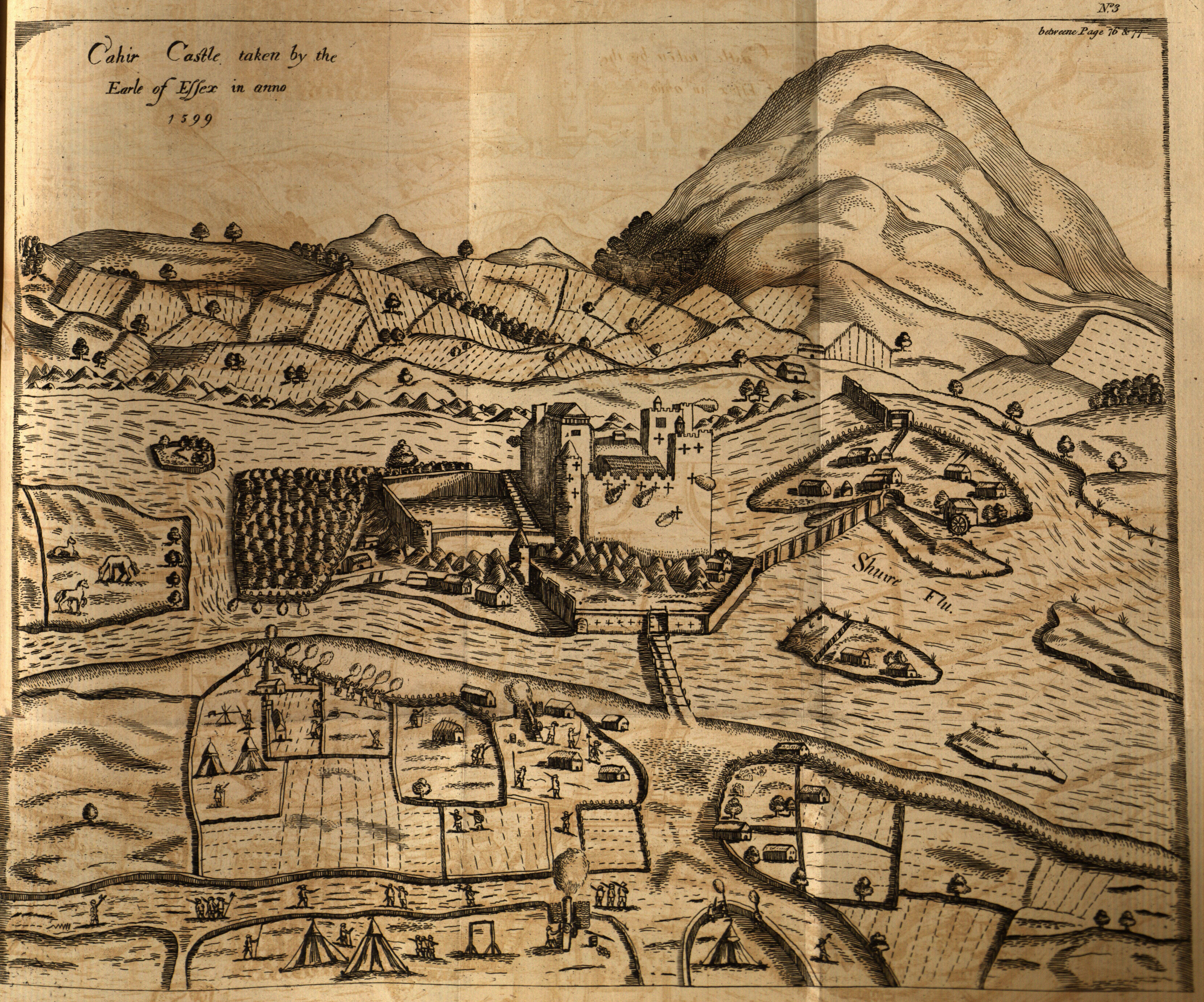
Siege of Cahir Castle in 1599

A council of war was called in the presence of the Earl of Ormond. The army was stationary, with supplies running low, and in poor weather on a flooded river plain the hazard of disease was increasing. There was also a rumour that a rebel force of 5,000 had mustered in the vicinity. Orders were given to procure more munitions from Waterford, as well as victuals from the town and surrounding country.

In the evening, Essex surveyed the castle with George Bingham, who had successfully besieged Maguire's island castle in Enniskillen in 1594. It was decided that approaches should be made along the east bank by way of old ditches and a wall, and that a trench be dug close up to the riverbank, within 50 paces of the castle, where a platform for the cannon might be erected. The engineers worked under cover of the musketeers and caliver men, with gabions (wicker baskets filled with earth) to shield them from hostile fire. The culverin was to be placed further back, with a wider view of the castle flanks.

On Saturday the 26th, the vanguard and main battle moved closer to the castle to camp on the east bank. Essex could have surrounded the castle by occupying the west bank with a detachment, but chose otherwise for fear his men would be unable to make it back to fend off any attack. In the afternoon, there was free traffic in and out of the castle, and he ordered a detachment of 300 to seize the orchard garden on the southside, which had been plashed on its outer edges: this was readily achieved with the loss of only a few men, although the English had been especially vulnerable as they crossed the river.

Late in the day, the rearguard arrived with the artillery. After a night of preparation, the guns were in place on the east bank on Whitsun Sunday, the 27th, and opened fire. The cannon was at point-blank range, but its carriage broke at the second shot - the damage took a day and a half to repair. Then a ball stuck in the culverin, but this was quickly cleared, and fifty shots were fired, until the garrison was silenced: they dared not stay in any tower or fight on that side of the castle. During the cannonade, Lord Cahir and his wife were said to have wept like children.

From the west bank, the White Knight relieved the castle with a few score kerne, withdrawing those unfit to defend. Essex sent Christopher St Lawrence, son of Lord Howth, and a colonel of foot, to an island on the north-east, which carried two bridges connecting the castle to the west bank; the bridges were broken, and the island was victualled by bringing boats overland past the castle and setting them in the river upstream.

In the evening, the cannon was reset on its carriage and the culverin drawn a little closer. On the 28th, the cannonade resumed at close quarters, and the east wall was breached. Preparations for an assault on the following morning were made: engineers made climbing ladders, scaffolds and sows (moveable protective screens); and petards (wooden cases of gunpowder, for blowing in doors or barricades) were assembled to undermine the walls. The plan was for four companies of veteran foot to make their assault through a sap trench once the powder had blown.

During the night, the garrison made an effort to steal away, but were spotted and met by Charles Percy and St Lawrence with four companies of Flanders veterans. At least 80 were slain along the river, but James Galdie escaped with some of his men through a sink shaft under a watermill. The English penetrated the castle courtyards at night without resistance.

On the morning of the 29th, Essex entered the castle, and the guns were soon mounted on the deserted walls, which had their breaches repaired. The castle was garrisoned with 100 men under the command of George Carey, who had suffered a face wound from which he later died. The army rested in camp until the 31st, while the sick and wounded were sent to Clonmel. The bridge at Golden had been repaired, and Essex crossed the Suir to enter rebel territory in west Munster.

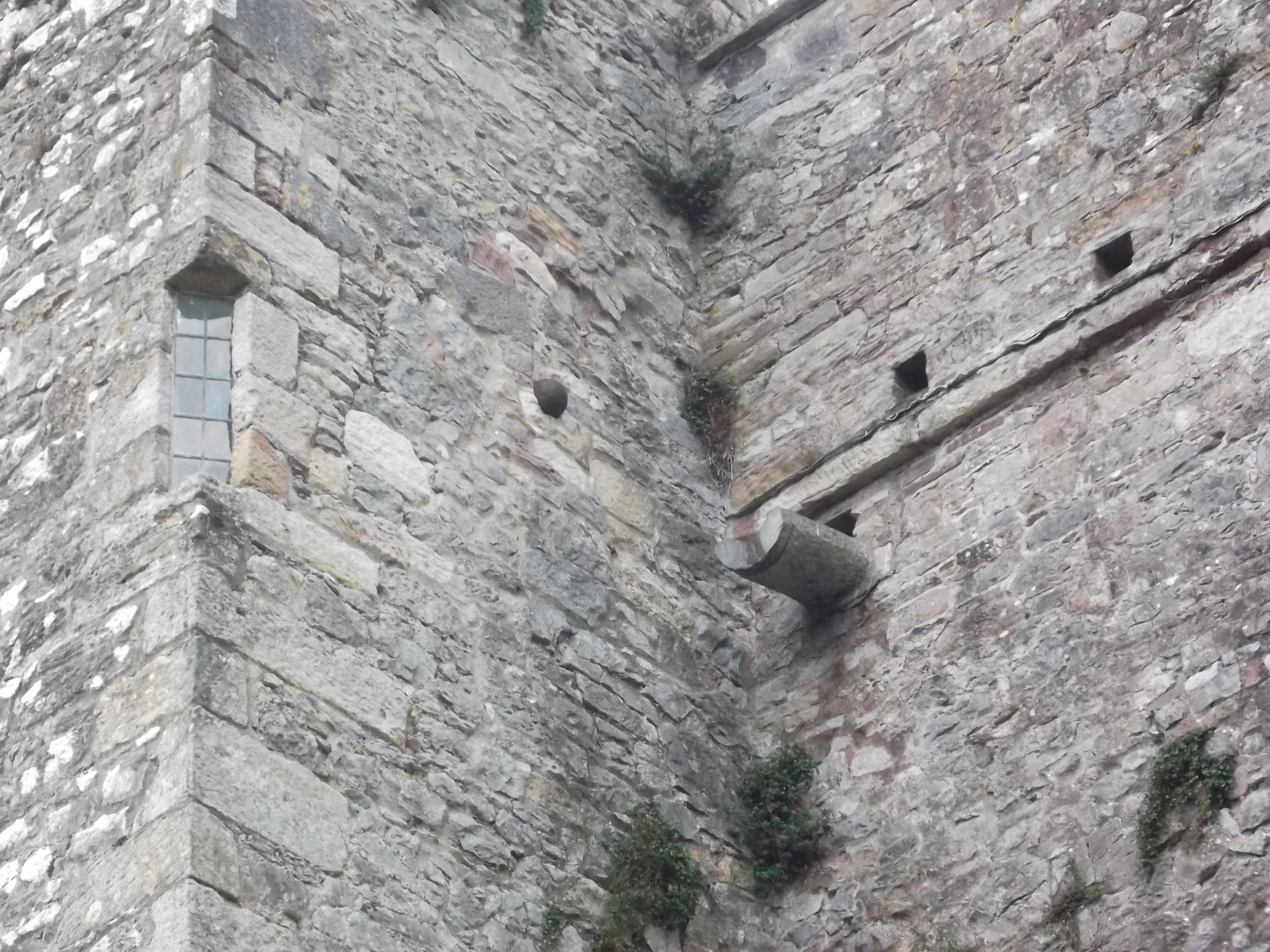
A cannonball still lodged in the wall of the main tower

== Aftermath ==
Essex made much of his capture of Cahir Castle, but the queen demeaned his achievement by describing Galdie's defenders as a rabble of rogues. Soon after, Essex's campaign ground to a halt with a controversial cessation of arms with O'Neill, and the English commander fled the country to patch up his relations with Elizabeth. In the following year, 1600, the castle was retaken without a shot by 60 rebels under James Butler, and was in turn surrendered to Sir George Carew under threat.
