= Edmond Butler, 3rd Baron Dunboyne =

- Baron Dunboyne
- Coat of arms
- Tenure: 1624– 1640
- Predecessor: James Butler, 2nd/12th Baron Dunboyne
- Successor: James Butler, 4th/14th Baron Dunboyne
- Born: 1595
- Died: March 17, 1640 (aged 44–45); Kiltinan Castle
- Buried: Fethard
- Spouses: Margaret Butler (died 1632) Lady Ellen FitzGerald (after 1632)
- Issue: 8
- Father: John Butler
- Mother: Joan Fitzpatrick

Edmond Butler, 3rd/13th Baron Dunboyne (1595–1640) was an Anglo-Irish nobleman of the early seventeenth century. His short life was full of violence and disputes over the Dunboyne inheritance. His father was murdered when Edmond was a small child, and Edmond, as an adult, was forced to defend a lengthy lawsuit brought by his uncle, who sought to disinherit him. In 1627, he killed his cousin James Prendergast in a quarrel over a disputed inheritance. For this crime, he was tried by his peers for manslaughter, but was acquitted.

== Background ==
He was the only son of John Butler and Joan Fitzpatrick. His father, John Butler, was the eldest son and heir of James Butler, 2nd/12th Baron Dunboyne (d. 1624) and his first wife Margaret Fitzpatrick, only child of Barnaby Fitzpatrick, 2nd Baron Upper Ossory and his wife Joan Eustace, daughter of Rowland Eustace, 2nd Viscount Baltinglass. His mother, Joan Fitzpatrick, was the daughter of Barnaby's brother and heir, Florence Fitzpatrick, 3rd Baron Upper Ossory and his wife, Catherine O'More, daughter of Patrick O'More of Abbeyleix. Joan died a year or two after her son's birth in 1595. In 1602, his father was murdered by Richard Grace, as a result of a longstanding feud between the Graces and John Butler's mother's family, the Fitzpatricks, which had been going on since the 1570s. Wardship of the young boy was awarded to his paternal grandfather, the 2nd Baron Dunboyne.

== Inheritance dispute ==
The next heir to the Dunboyne barony after Edmond was his uncle, the 2nd Baron's younger son Pierce (whose grandson, also named Pierce, was later to inherit the title as the 5th Baron). In 1618, Pierce petitioned the Crown to declare his nephew illegitimate, on the grounds that while his parents had lived together as man and wife, his father was at all material times married to Eleanor, a daughter of Theobald Butler, 1st Baron Cahir. There is no reason to think that the allegation was true, and there is some doubt as to whether Eleanor even existed, but King James I was apparently reluctant to dismiss it out of hand. He wrote to Lord Dunboyne saying that he had no wish either to deprive his ward of his rights or to deprive Pierce of any rights which might belong to him. He ordered the parties to submit their dispute to the Court of Chancery (Ireland); this led to a lawsuit which went on for three years and involved several hearings in different courts. Eventually, in 1621 the Lord Chancellor of Ireland made a decree in favour of Lord Dunboyne, ordering his son Pierce to cease interference with or disturbance of his peaceful enjoyment of his lands. This was a clear victory for young Edmond, and when his grandfather died in 1624 he succeeded to his title and estates without any further trouble from his uncle, who died in 1626.

== His killing of James Prendergast and trial for manslaughter ==
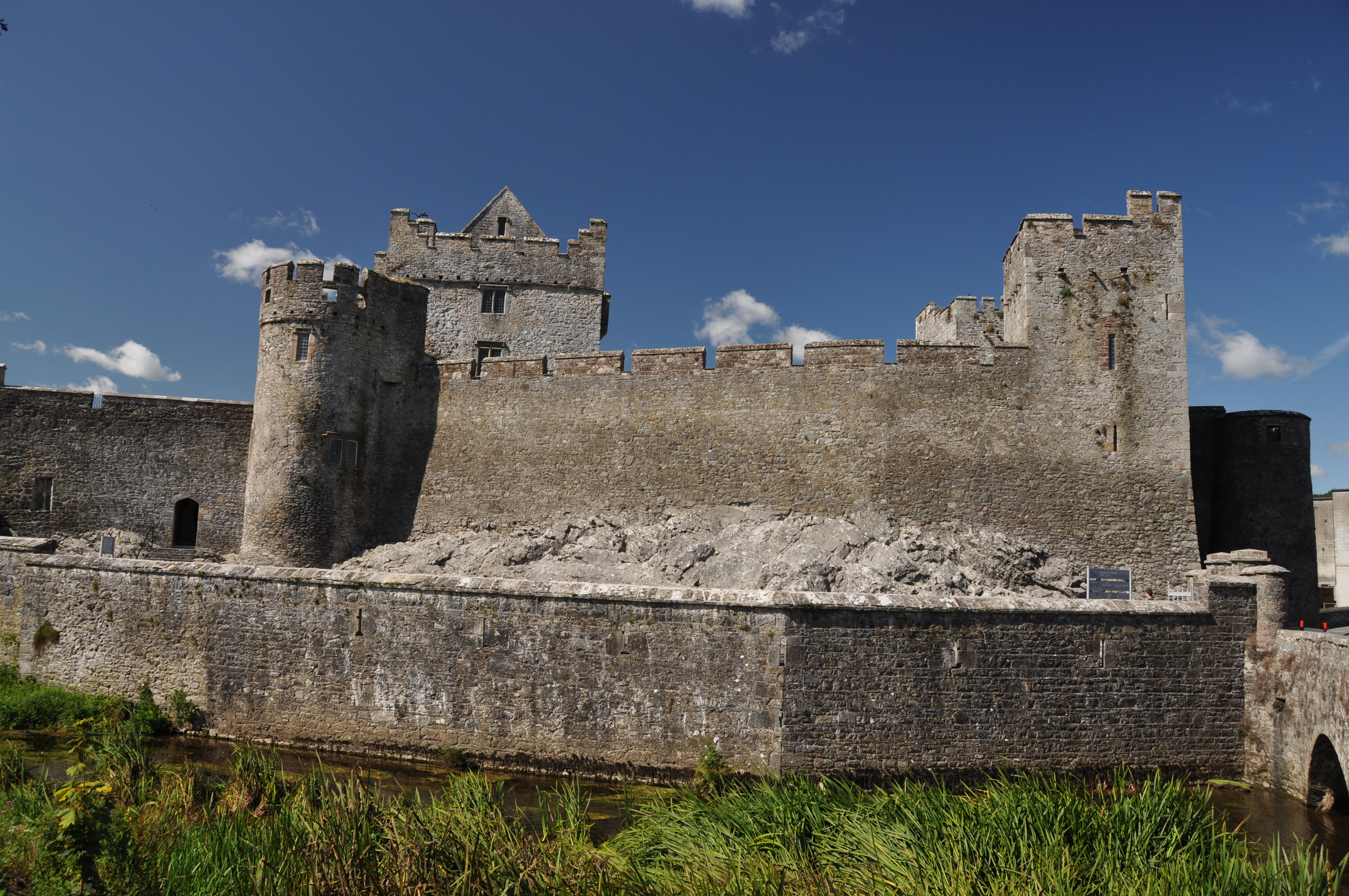
Cahir Castle today

In December 1627, Dunboyne was staying at Cahir Castle, the seat of his wife's family. Also present at Cahir Castle was another Butler relative, James Prendergast, a nephew of Walter Butler, 11th Earl of Ormonde (his mother Eleanor Butler being the Earl's sister). Dunboyne and Prendergast each claimed the Irish feudal barony of Newcastle Lyons. On 12 December, they quarrelled over their rival claims: the quarrel turned violent and Dunboyne killed Prendergast.

He was arrested and imprisoned in Dublin Castle. King Charles I, who was generally willing to allow the law to take its course, even against members of the nobility, ordered that Dunboyne must stand trial, although on the lesser charge of manslaughter rather than murder. Since he had the privilege of peerage, i.e., the right to be tried by his peers, the Lord High Steward of Ireland set up a panel of fifteen peers to try him. The trial took place on 4 June 1628, and by fourteen votes to one, Lord Docwra dissenting, they acquitted him.

== Last years ==
Lord Dunboyne sat in the Irish House of Lords in the Irish Parliament of 1634 and in that of 1639. He died on 17 March 1640 at his home, Kiltinan Castle, and was buried in the nearby town of Fethard.

== Family ==
He married firstly Margaret Butler, daughter of Thomas Butler, 2nd Baron Cahir and his second wife Ellice Fitzgerald; she died in 1632. They had at least eight children:

- James Butler, 4th/14th Baron Dunboyne (died 1662)
- Thomas, who fought in the Rebellion of 1641
- Ellen, who married James Butler, and was the mother of Pierce, 2nd Viscount Ikerrin
- Eleanor, who married Edmond Butler, and was the mother of Pierce, 4th Baron Cahir
- John, Edmund, Richard and Margaret, who died young.

He married secondly his cousin Lady Ellen FitzGerald, daughter of Gerald FitzGerald, 14th Earl of Desmond and his second wife Eleanor Butler (who was Dunboyne's great-aunt, a daughter of the 1st Baron Dunboyne). Ellen was some years his senior and had already been twice married. She died at a great age in 1660.

Peerage of Ireland
Preceded by James Butler	Baron Dunboyne; 1624–1640	Succeeded by James Butler
