= Thomas Butler, 1st Baron Cahir =

Irish noble

Thomas Butler, 1st Baron Cahir or Caher (died 1558) was an Irish peer.

== Biography ==
Butler was the son of Catherine Power and Edmund Butler, in turn a descendant of James "Gallda" Butler.

Thomas Butler was elevated to the peerage of Ireland, on 10 November 1543, by the title of Baron of Caher. He married Eleanor Butler, fifth daughter of Piers Butler, 8th Earl of Ormond. He lived in Cahir Castle and ruled much of the barony of Iffa and Offa West.

He died in 1558 and was succeeded by his only surviving son and heir, Edmund Butler, 2nd Baron Cahir who died himself two years later. As Butler had no legitimate male heirs, the title became extinct. It was, however, revived in favour of his first cousin, Theobald Butler, 1st Baron Cahir (of the second creation).

== See also ==
- Butler dynasty

Peerage of Ireland
New creation	Baron Cahir; 1542–1558	Succeeded by Edmund Butler
