= Husseystown =

Townland in County Tipperary, Ireland

Husseystown (Baile Hoisé in Irish) is a townland in the barony of Iffa and Offa West, County Tipperary in Ireland. It is located in the civil parish of Caher.
