= Thomas Butler, 2nd Baron Cahir =

Irish noble

Thomas Butler, 2nd Baron Cahir (before 1568 – 31 January 1626/27) was an Anglo-Irish peer. He was the son of Theobald Butler, 1st Baron Cahir and Mary Cusack. He succeeded to the title on 28 April 1596.

== Marriage and issue ==
He married, firstly, his distant cousin Eleanor Butler, who was the daughter of Richard Butler, 1st Viscount Mountgarret and Eleanor Butler (a granddaughter of the 8th Earl of Ormond), before October 1598, but had no issue. He married, secondly, Ellice Fitzgerald, daughter of Sir John Fitzgerald, after 1601. They had a daughter,

- Margaret Butler (born circa 1606, died 1632) who married Edmond Butler, 3rd/13th Baron Dunboyne. They had eight children, including James, 4th Baron Dunboyne, and Eleanor, mother of the 4th Baron Cahir.

As this marriage was also without male issue, the barony devolved upon his nephew Thomas who was the third son of the baron's uncle, Piers Butler. His widow remarried Sir Thomas Esmonde, 1st Baronet and had further issue.

== Career ==
In 1599 Cahir Castle was captured by the Earl of Essex. During the siege Thomas was held prisoner, although his wife and brother refused to give up the castle. In 1599 he joined in Tyrone's rebellion, but then surrendered and was attainted. On 27 May 1601, he was pardoned of all treason and other crimes.

== See also ==
Butler dynasty

Peerage of Ireland
Preceded by Theobald Butler	Baron Cahir; 1596–1627	Succeeded by Thomas Butler
