= Theobald Butler, 1st Baron Cahir =

Irish baron (d. 1596)

Theobald Butler
- Baron Cahir
- Tenure: 1583–1696
- Successor: Thomas Butler, 2nd Baron Cahir
- Died: 28 April 1596; Cahir
- Spouse: Mary Cusack
- Issue Detail: Thomas & others
- Father: Piers Butler
- Mother: Butler

Sir Theobald Butler, 1st Baron Cahir, Caher, or Cahier (died 1596) was the first baron Cahir of the second creation, which occurred in 1583.

== Birth and origin ==
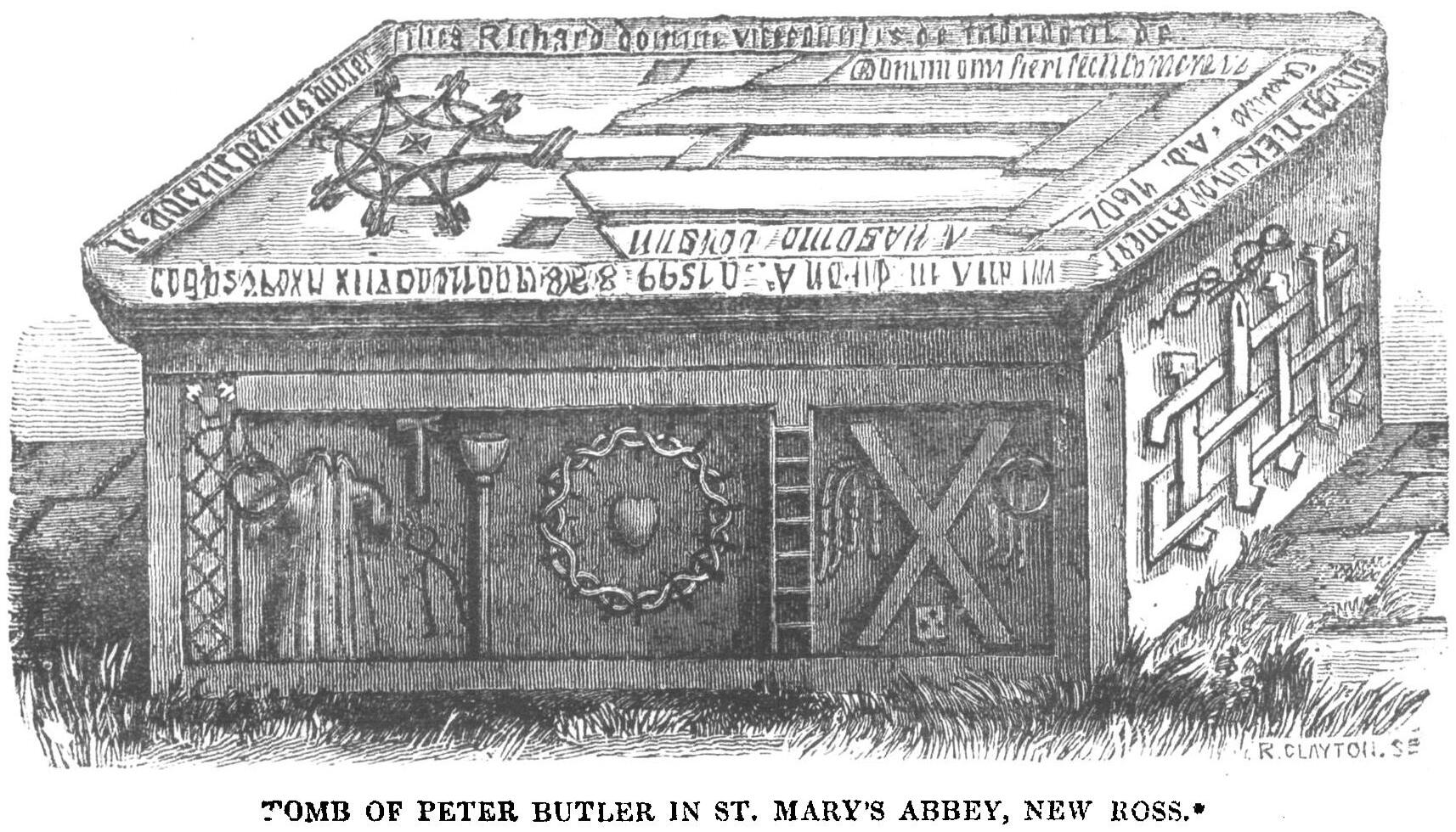
Tomb of his father, Piers, at St. Mary's Church, New Ross

Family tree

Theobals Butler with his wife, his parents, and other selected relatives. (Note: This family tree is based on genealogies of the Barons of Cahir, Also see the list of children in the text.)

Edmund; Butler	Catharine; Power
Thomas; 1st Baron; Cahir d. 1627	Eleanor; Butler	Pierce; Butler
Edmund; 2nd Baron d. 1560	Theobald; 1st Baron; Cahir d. 1596	Mary; Cusack
Thomas; 2nd Baron d. 1627	Pierce; Butler of Cloghcullie	Eleanor; Butler
Thomas; 3rd baron d. 1648	Ellinor; Power

Legend

XXX	Subject of the article	XXX	Barons; Cahir

Theobald was the eldest son of Piers Butler and his wife, née Butler, whose first name is unknown. His father was the younger brother of Thomas Butler, 1st Baron Cahir of the first creation. His father's family, the Butlers of Cahir (also spelt Caher or Cahier) were a cadet line of the Butlers of Ormond that started with James Gallda Butler, a younger son of James Butler, 3rd Earl of Ormond. His mother was a daughter of MacPierce, Lord Dunboyne.

== Battle of Affane ==
His father, Piers Butler, felt that he was oppressed by Ormond and sided in 1565 with Gerald FitzGerald, 14th Earl of Desmond fighting on the losing side against the Ormonds in the Battle of Affane.

== Marriage and children ==
Butler married Mary Cusack, daughter of Sir Thomas Cusack of Cussington, County Meath, Lord Chancellor of Ireland, and his second wife Maud Darcy.

Theobald and Mary had six sons:

1. Thomas Butler, 2nd Baron Cahir (c. 1568 – 1627), his successor
2. Piers of Cloghcullie (Clocully), County Tipperary, who married Eleanor, the daughter of Pierce Butler of Callan, County Kilkenny and left a son Thomas;, who became the 3rd Baron (Note: Cokayne (1912) rightly says "Piers of Cloghcullie", but Burke 1866 in error said "Edmund of Clogcullie".)
3. Edmund Butler, died childless
4. Richard of Clonbrogan, the father of Pierce whose son Theobald became the 5th Baron Cahir.
5. James of Knocklofty (died 1630), whose son Theobald (died 1630) was involved in the rebellion of 1598
6. John, of Cloughbridy

—and two or three daughters:

1. Ellen, married Richard Butler of Ballyboe, County Tipperary
2. Mary, married Cormac MacDermot MacCarthy, 16th Lord of Muskerry, and was the mother of Charles MacCarthy, 1st Viscount Muskerry
3. Eleanor (although her existence is debatable), who was said to have married John Butler, eldest son of James Butler, 2nd Baron Dunboyne; but the claim, made in the course of an inheritance dispute over the right to the Dunboyne title, was probably false.

== Knight ==
In 1567 Butler was knighted at Clonmel by Henry Sidney, who had been appointed lord deputy of Ireland in 1565.

== Baron Cahir ==
Butler was the nephew of Thomas Butler, 1st Baron Cahir (of the first creation, which occurred in 1542). When Butler's first cousin Edmund, the 2nd Baron, died without issue in 1560, the title became extinct. It was, however, revived on 6 May 1583 by Queen Elizabeth I in Butler's favour. He became the 1st Baron Cahir (of the second creation) and ruled much of the barony of Iffa and Offa West.

== Death and timeline ==
Cahir died on 28 April 1596 at Cahir, County Tipperary. He was succeeded by his eldest son Thomas as the 2nd Baron Cahir of the second creation.

Timeline
As his birth date is uncertain, so are all his ages.
Age	Date	Event
0	1540, about	Born
9–10	1550, 4 Aug	Anthony St Leger, appointed Lord Deputy of Ireland (2nd term)
12–13	1553, 6 Jul	Accession of Mary I, succeeding Edward VI
15–16	1556, 27 Apr	Thomas Radcliffe (later earl of Sussex), appointed Lord Deputy of Ireland
17–18	1558, 17 Nov	Accession of Elizabeth I, succeeding Mary I
19–20	1560	Edmund Butler, 2nd Baron Cahir, the last baron of the 1st creation died.
31–32	1565, 8 Feb	Battle of Affane won by the Butlers over Gerald FitzGerald, 14th Earl of Desmond
24–25	1565, 13 Oct	Henry Sidney appointed Lord Deputy of Ireland
26–27	1567, 14 Feb	Knighted by Henry Sidney at Clonmel
32–33	1573, 23 Fe	Fitz Maurice submitted to John Perrot, Lord President of Munster, at Kilmallock
42–43	1583, 6 May	Created 1st Baron Cahir of the 2nd creation
55–56	1596, 28 Apr	Died.

== Notes and references ==
=== Sources ===
- Bagwell, Richard (1885). Ireland under the Tudors. Vol. II. London: Longmans, Green, and Co. OCLC 761857292. – 1558 to 1578
- Burke, Bernard (1866). A Genealogical History of the Dormant, Abeyant, Forfeited and Extinct Peerages of the British Empire (New ed.). London: Harrison. OCLC 11501348.
- Cokayne, George Edward (1893). Complete peerage of England, Scotland, Ireland, Great Britain and the United Kingdom, extant, extinct, or dormant. Vol. V (1st ed.). London: George Bell and Sons. OCLC 1180836840. – L to M (for Muskerry)
- Cokayne, George Edward (1912). Gibbs, Vicary (ed.). The complete peerage of England, Scotland, Ireland, Great Britain and the United Kingdom, extant, extinct, or dormant. Vol. II (2nd ed.). London: St Catherine Press. OCLC 228661424. – Bass to Canning (for Caher)
- Fryde, E. B.; Greenway, D. E.; Porter, S.; Roy, I., eds. (1986). Handbook of British Chronology. Royal Historical Society Guides and Handbooks, No. 2 (3rd ed.). London: Offices of the Royal Historical Society. ISBN 0-86193-106-8. – (for timeline)
- Lodge, John (1789). Archdall, Mervyn (ed.). The Peerage of Ireland or, A Genealogical History of the Present Nobility of that Kingdom. Vol. VI. Dublin: James Moore. OCLC 264906028. – Viscounts, barons
- McCormack, Anthony M. (October 2009). McGuire, James; Quinn, James (eds.). "FitzGerald, James fitz Maurice". Dictionary of Irish Biography.
- McGurk, J. J. N. (2004). "FitzGerald, Gerald fitz James, fourteenth earl of Desmond (c. 1533–1583)". In Matthew, Colin; Harrison, Brian (eds.). Oxford Dictionary of National Biography. Vol. 19. New York: Oxford University Press. pp. 809–811. ISBN 0-19-861369-5.

Peerage of Ireland
New creation	Baron Cahir; 1583–1596	Succeeded by Thomas Butler
