= Thomas Butler, 3rd Baron Cahir =

Anglo-Irish peer

Thomas Butler, 3rd Baron Cahir or Caher (died c. 1648) was an Anglo-Irish peer. He was the son of Piers Butler, the nephew of his namesake the 2nd Baron and the grandson of the 1st Baron.

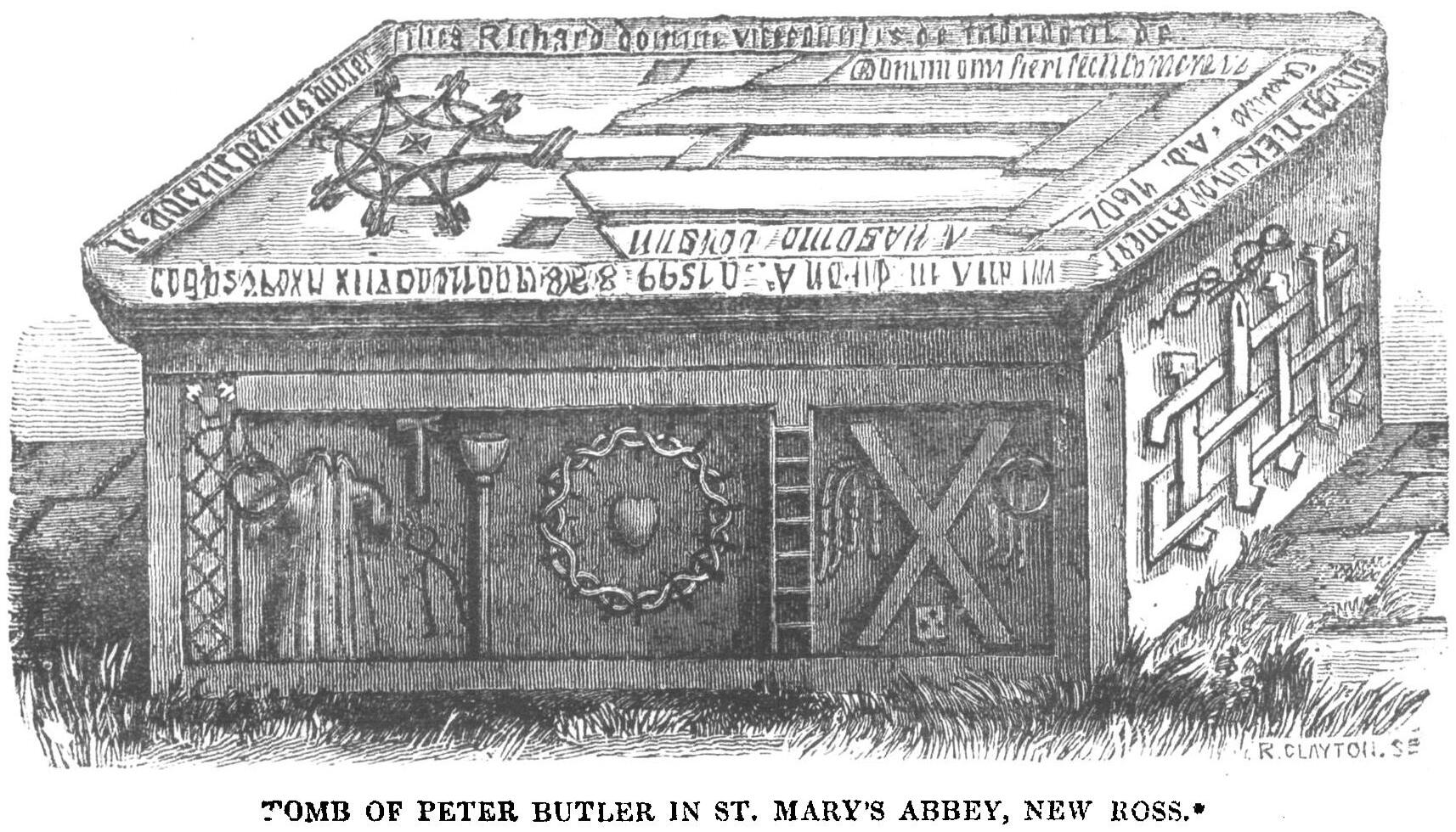
Tomb of his father, Piers, at St. Mary's Church, New Ross

== Marriage and issue ==
He married Eleanor, the sister of John Power, 5th Baron Le Power. His heir, Edmund, predeceased the Baron who was succeeded by his grandson, Pierce.

Peerage of Ireland
Preceded by Thomas Butler	Baron Cahir; 1626/7–1648	Succeeded by Pierce Butler
