= Iffa and Offa West =

Barony in County Tipperary, Ireland

Iffa and Offa West (Irish: Uíbh Eoghain agus Uíbh Fhathaidh Thiar) is a barony in County Tipperary, Ireland. This geographical unit of land is one of 12 baronies in County Tipperary. Its chief town is Cahir. The barony lies between Clanwilliam to the north-west (whose chief town is Tipperary), Middle Third to the north-east (whose chief town is Cashel) and Iffa and Offa East to the east (whose chief town is Clonmel). The area is currently administered by Tipperary County Council. The barony is within the geographic remit of the Roman Catholic Diocese of Waterford and Lismore.

== Legal context ==
Baronies were created after the Norman invasion of Ireland as divisions of counties and were used the administration of justice and the raising of revenue. While baronies continue to be officially defined units, they have been administratively obsolete since 1898. However, they continue to be used in land registration and in specification, such as in planning permissions. In many cases, a barony corresponds to an earlier Gaelic túath which had submitted to the Crown.

== History ==
As the name suggests, in medieval times the territory of the barony (and its neighbour to the east) was controlled by the Gaelic clans of Uíbh Eoghain and Uíbh Fhathaidh. Following the conquest of Ireland by the Normans, much of the territory was, by royal grant, handed over to the victorious barons.

=== Feudal history ===
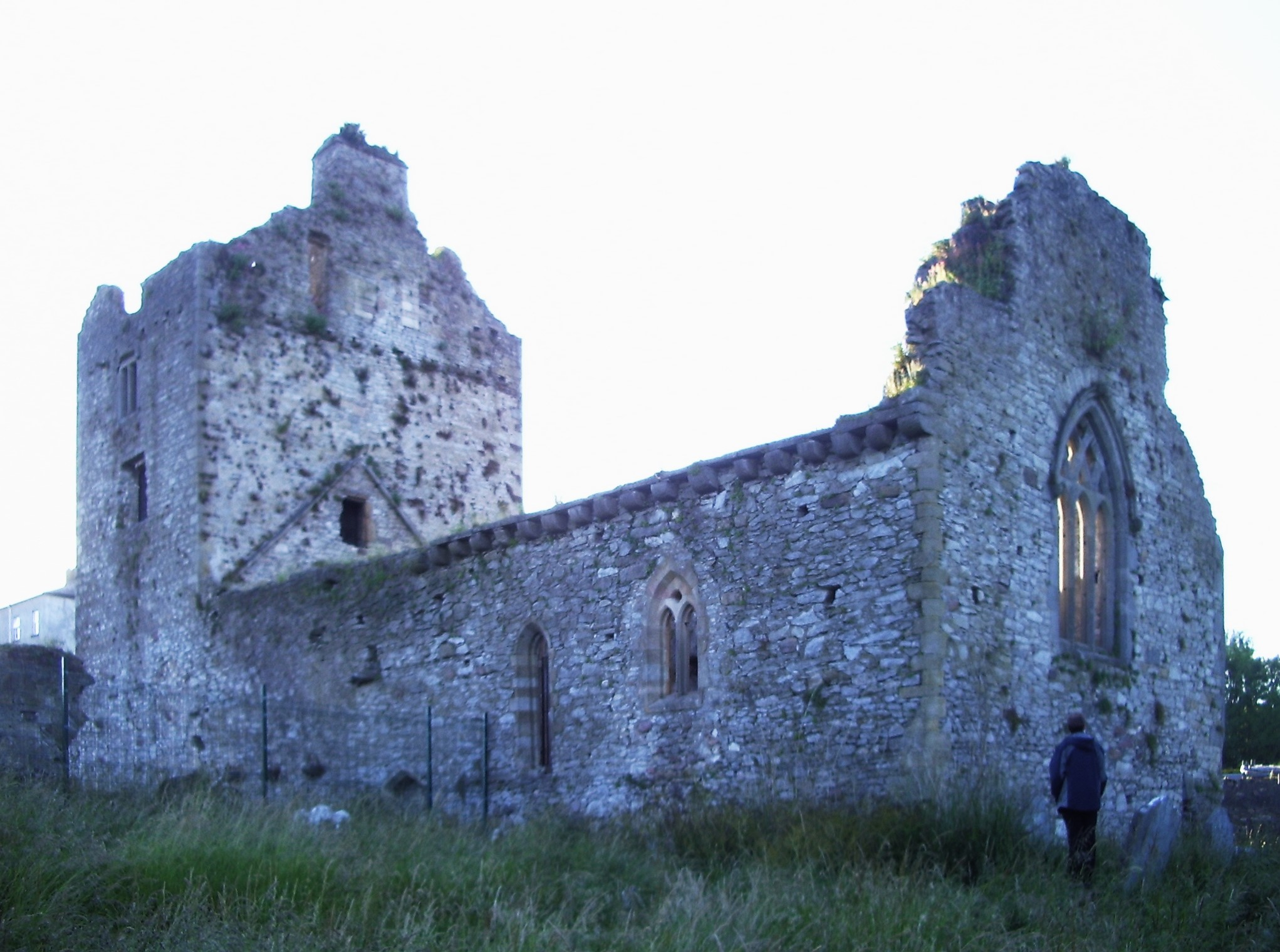
Cahir Abbey, 2007.

William de Camville (born about 1142, from Leicestershire, England, died about 1208) married Albreda Marmion (born about 1150) about 1164 when she was just 14 years old. She was the daughter of Geoffrey Marmion. They had a son, Geoffrey de Camville who was born about 1182, in Leicestershire, England. Geoffrey married Felicia (who was born about 1190) about 1206 when she was just 16 years old. He enters Irish records some time prior to his marriage.

Cahir Abbey was in existence by c.1200 when the prior is listed as a witness to one of the documents contained in the register of the hospital of St. John's Dublin. In this, a grant to the hospital by Geoffrey de Camville, the prior John is described as first prior (Primo – Priore) of "Kaherdunesche", which suggests that the priory was a relatively recent foundation at this time. It is the same Geoffrey de Camville who is credited with the foundation of the priory in Cahir. Geoffrey was Baron of both Cahir and Fedamore in Co. Limerick.

Having no male heir (the only child of Geoffrey and Felicia being a daughter, Felicia de Camville), the titles to the baronies lapsed.

The next time that a "Baron Cahir" is mentioned is in the mid 16th century when a barony is created for a member of the Butler family – Thomas Butler, 1st Baron Cahir. He was a direct descendant of the Ormond branch of the Butler family, from James, the 3rd Earl. It was his father, the 2nd Earl, who had built Cahir Castle in 1375 to guard a strategic crossing point of the River Suir.

Ardfinnan Castle was built by order of King John around 1186 to guard another crossing of the River Suir. A bridge was started soon after the castle was completed.

=== Modern times ===
When County Tipperary was split into North and South Ridings in 1836, Iffa and Offa West was allocated to the south riding. However, the neighbouring barony of Kilnamanagh was split into Upper and Lower half-baronies, being allocated to the north and south ridings respectively.

== Features ==
The barony is set in that part of the Suir valley where the river makes a 90° turn to the east. The Knockmealdown Mountains rise abruptly to the south, forming the border with County Waterford before they trail off to the lesser peaks of the Kilworth Mountains further west at the Cork border. To the northwest lie the Galtee Mountains – Ireland's highest inland mountain range. The summit of Galtymore forms the demarcation with County Limerick.

== Towns, villages and townlands of the barony ==
Ballylooby, Ballyporeen, Burncourt, Clogheen, Grange, Husseystown

=== Civil parishes of the barony ===
This table lists an historical geographical sub-division of the barony known as the civil parish (not to be confused with an Ecclesiastical parish).

Name in Irish	Name in English
Ard Fhíonáin	Ardfinnan
Baile an Mhoirtéalaigh	Mortlestown
Baile an Róistigh	Rochestown
Baile Uí Bhéacáin	Ballybacon
An Caisleán Nua	Newcastle
An Chathair	Cahir
Deargráth	Derrygrath
Maigh Locha	Molough
An Neadán	Neddans
Seanraithin	Shanrahan
An Teampall Geal	Whitechurch
Teampall Toinne	Templetenny
Tiobraid	Tubbrid
Tulach Artáin	Tullaghorton
Tulaigh Mhaoláin	Tullaghmelan

== See also ==
- List of civil parishes of South Tipperary
