= Cahir Abbey =

Priory of St. Mary in Cahir
- Mainistir Chathair Dún Iascaigh
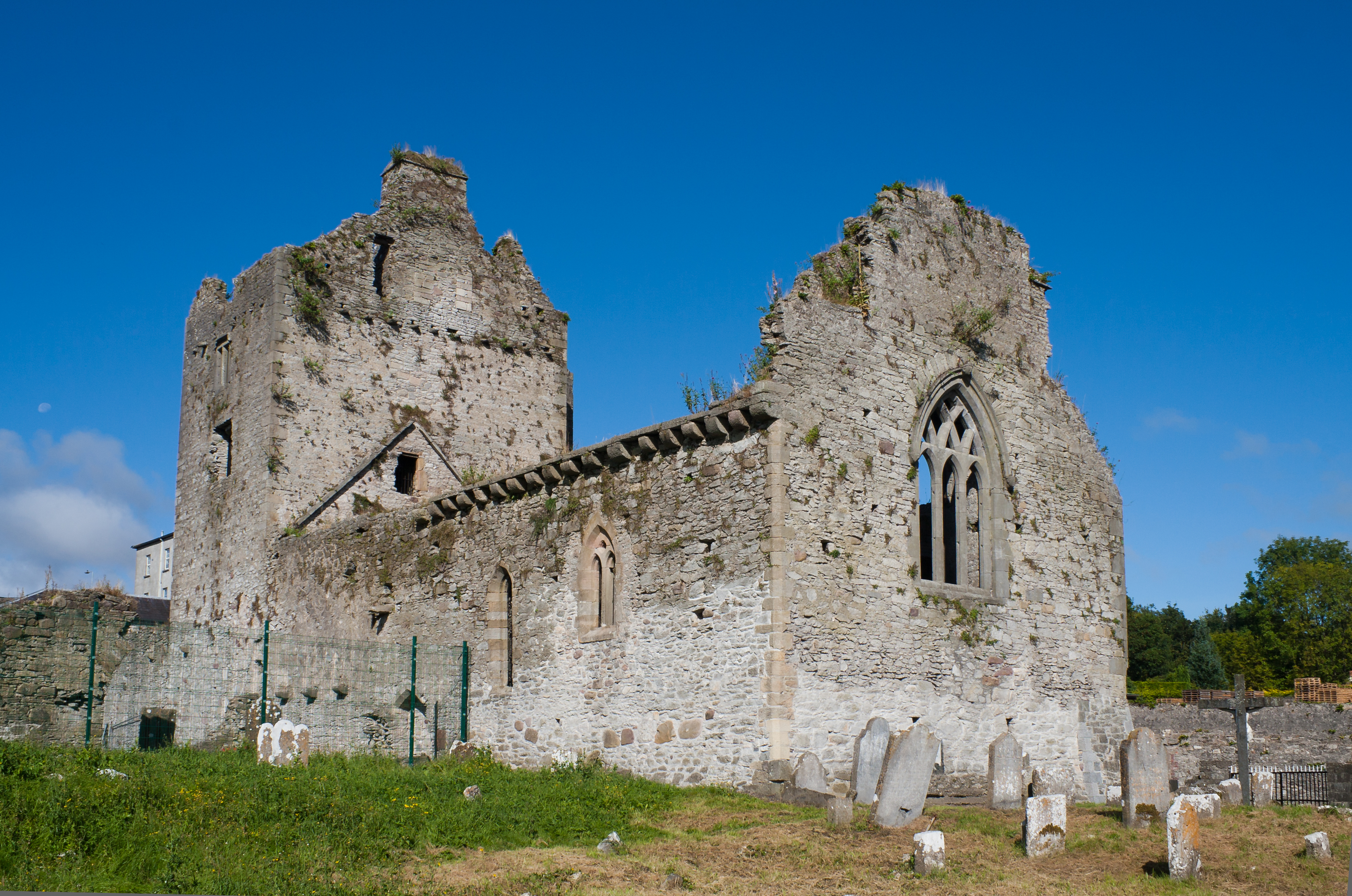
- Ruins of the abbey church

- Location within Ireland
- Interactive map of Priory of St. Mary in Cahir

Monastery information
- Other names: Cathair-duine-iascaid; Cahir-Dunesk; Cayrdunheach; Chaier; Kaherdunesche; Catherdunesque
- Order: Augustinian
- Established: late 12th century AD
- Disestablished: 1540
- Diocese: Waterford and Lismore

People
- Founder: Galfrid de Camville

Architecture
- Status: ruined
- Style: Late Gothic

Site
- Location: Abbey Street, Cahir, County Tipperary
- Coordinates: 52°22′46″N 7°55′42″W
- Public access: yes

The Priory of St. Mary in Cahir, known as Cahir Abbey, was a medieval priory of Augustinian Canons regular and is a National Monument located in Cahir, Ireland.

== Location ==
Cahir Abbey is located 600 metres (660 yd) north of Cahir Castle, on the west bank of the River Suir.

== History ==
The priory was founded in the late 12th century AD. It may have been a replacement for the 1178 burning of the 6th century abbey 4 miles south at Ardfinnan. Galfrid de Camville, Anglo-Norman Baron of Cahir and Fedamore, made a grant to its hospital c. 1200.

St Mary’s priory is a multi phased, with evidence of the original 13th century buildings and further alterations and additions in the 15th and 16th/17th centuries.

The priory was dissolved in 1540 and surrendered by prior Edmond O'Lonergan; the church, parochial and conventual buildings were occupied by Sir Thomas Butler by January 1541. The priory was alienated by William Hutchinson and Edward Walshe 1561 and granted to Edmond Butler in 1566.

== Buildings ==
The chancel of the church survives, with a row of windows in the north wall; also there are carved corbels and mouldings in limestone.

There is a residential tower, apparently seventeenth century in date, immediately west of the chancel.

There are also a cloister and domestic buildings. Mason's marks are visible.

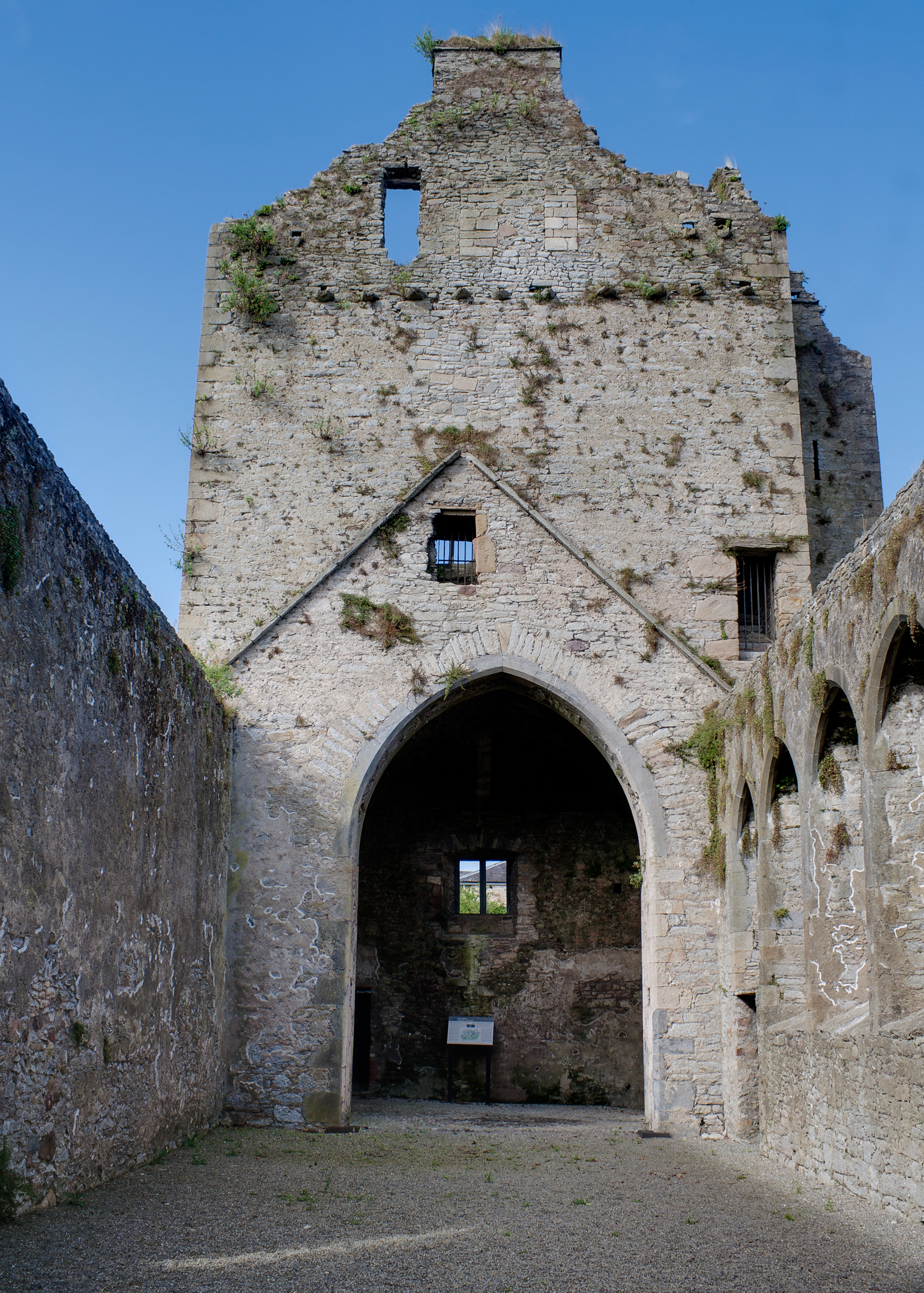
Nave of the church, looking west

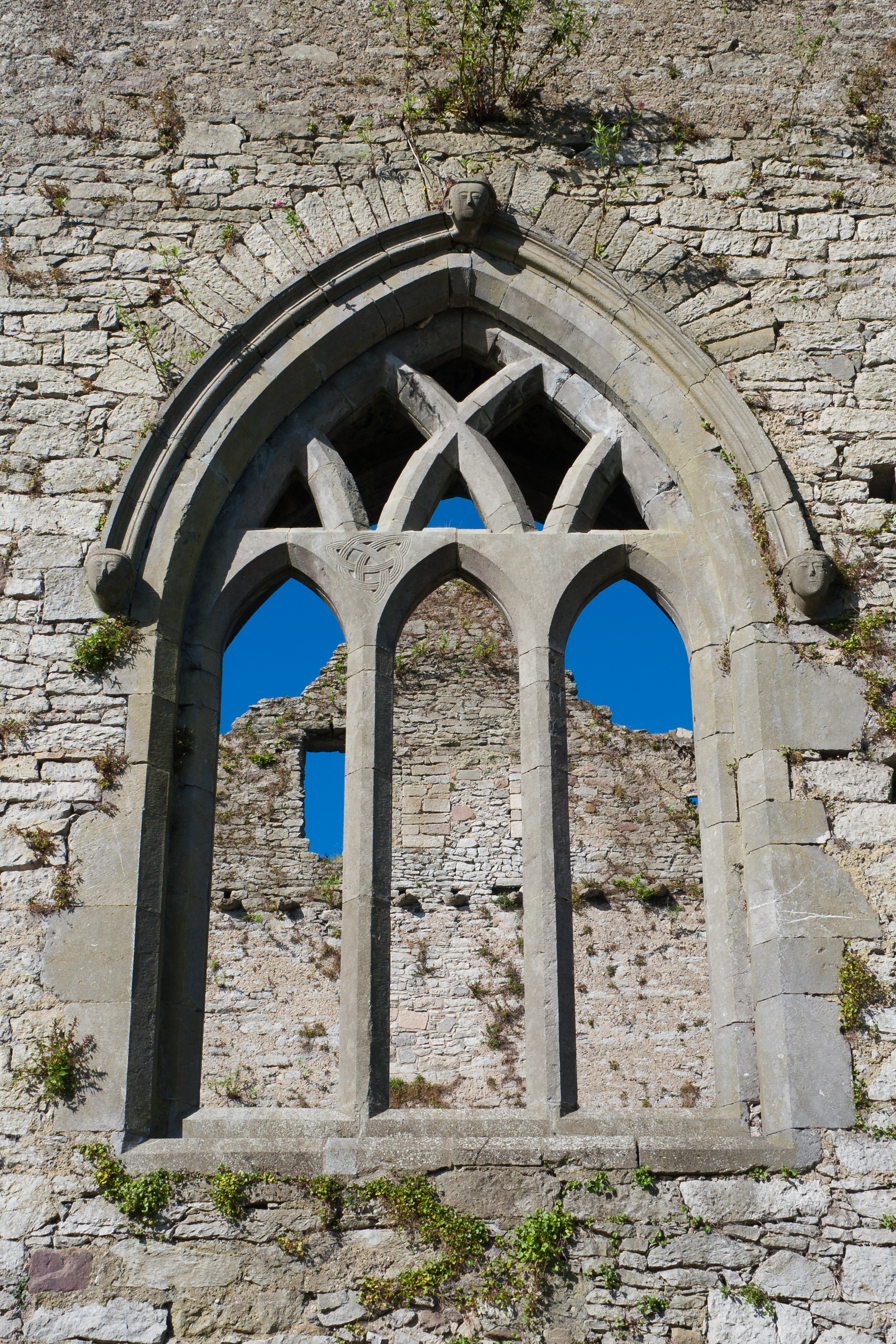
East window

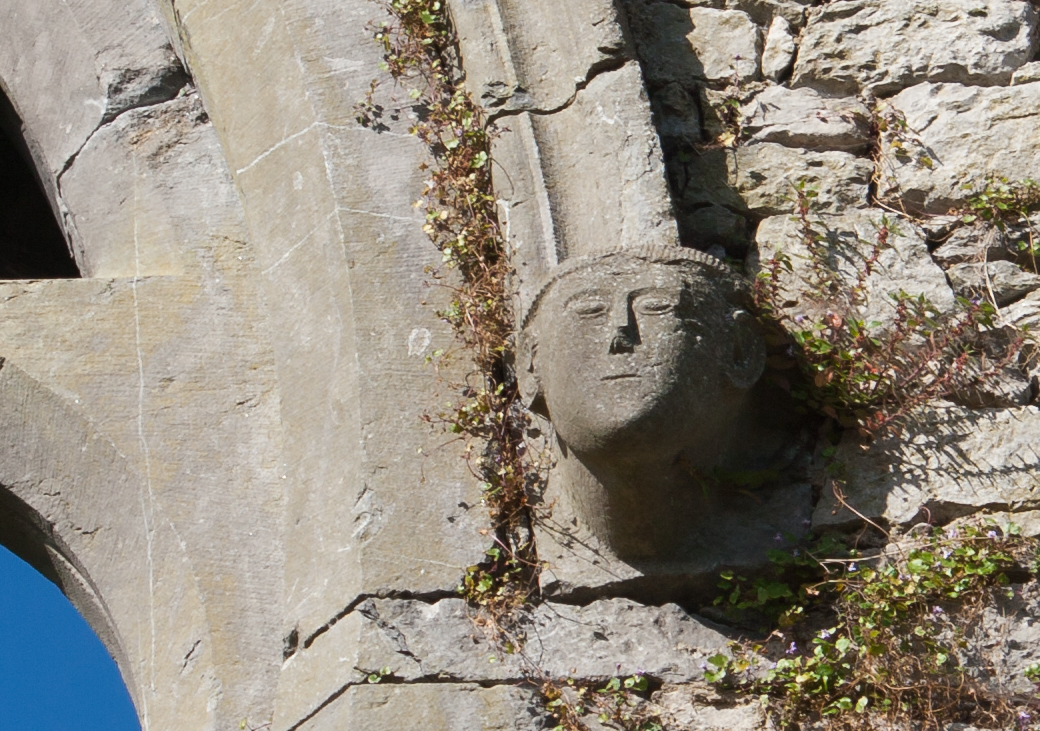
A label stop of a hood mould

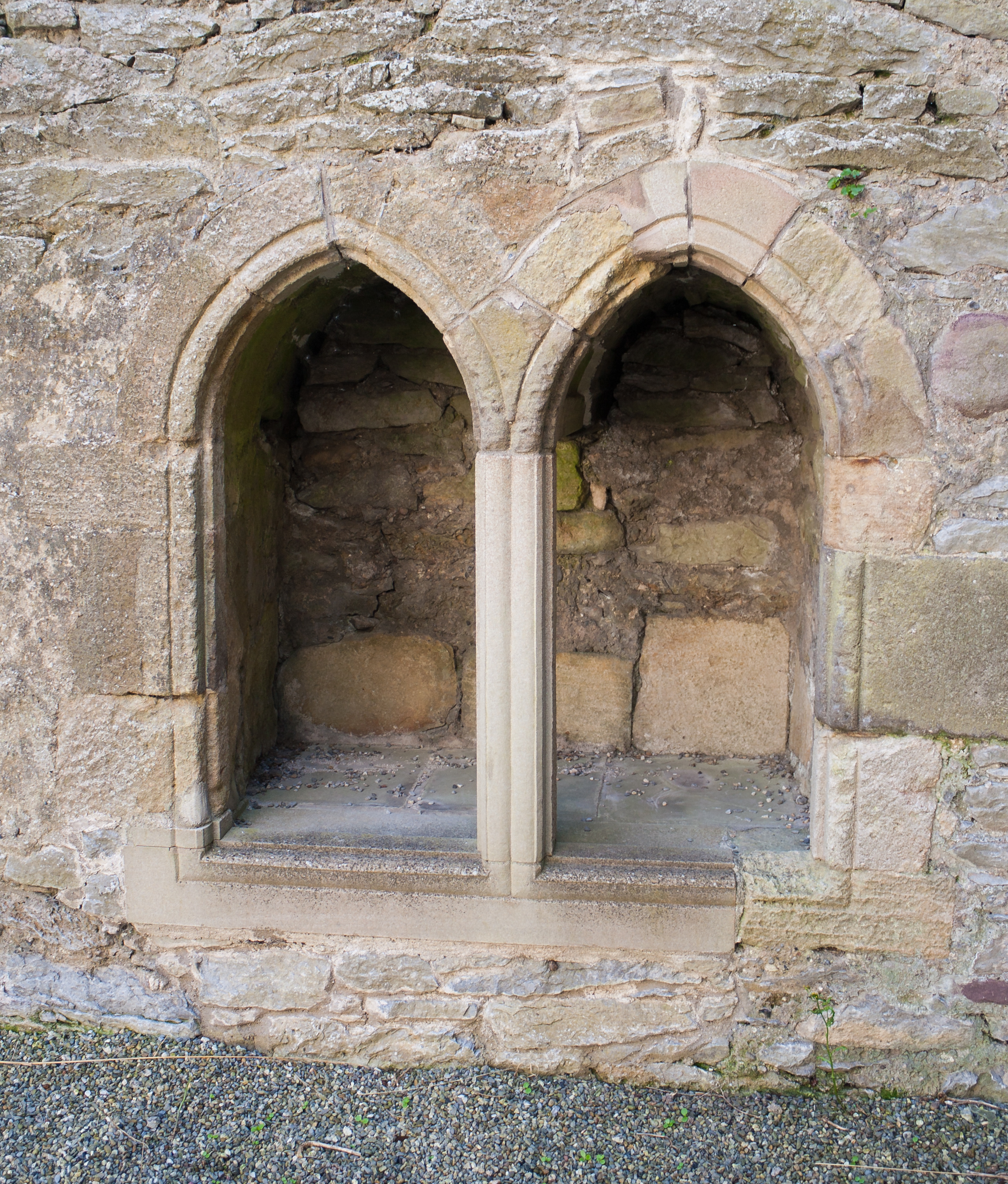
double piscina

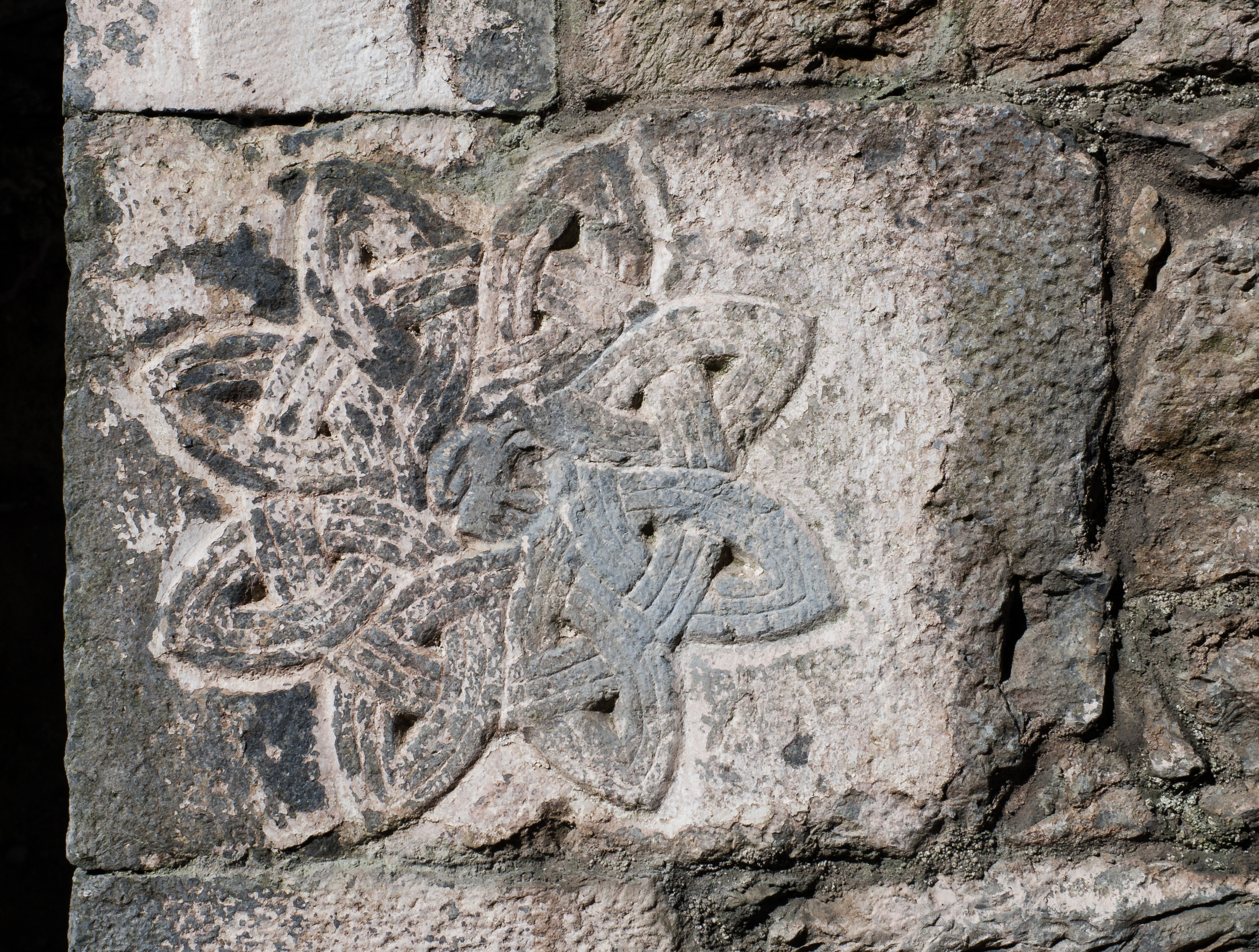
A carved Celtic knot

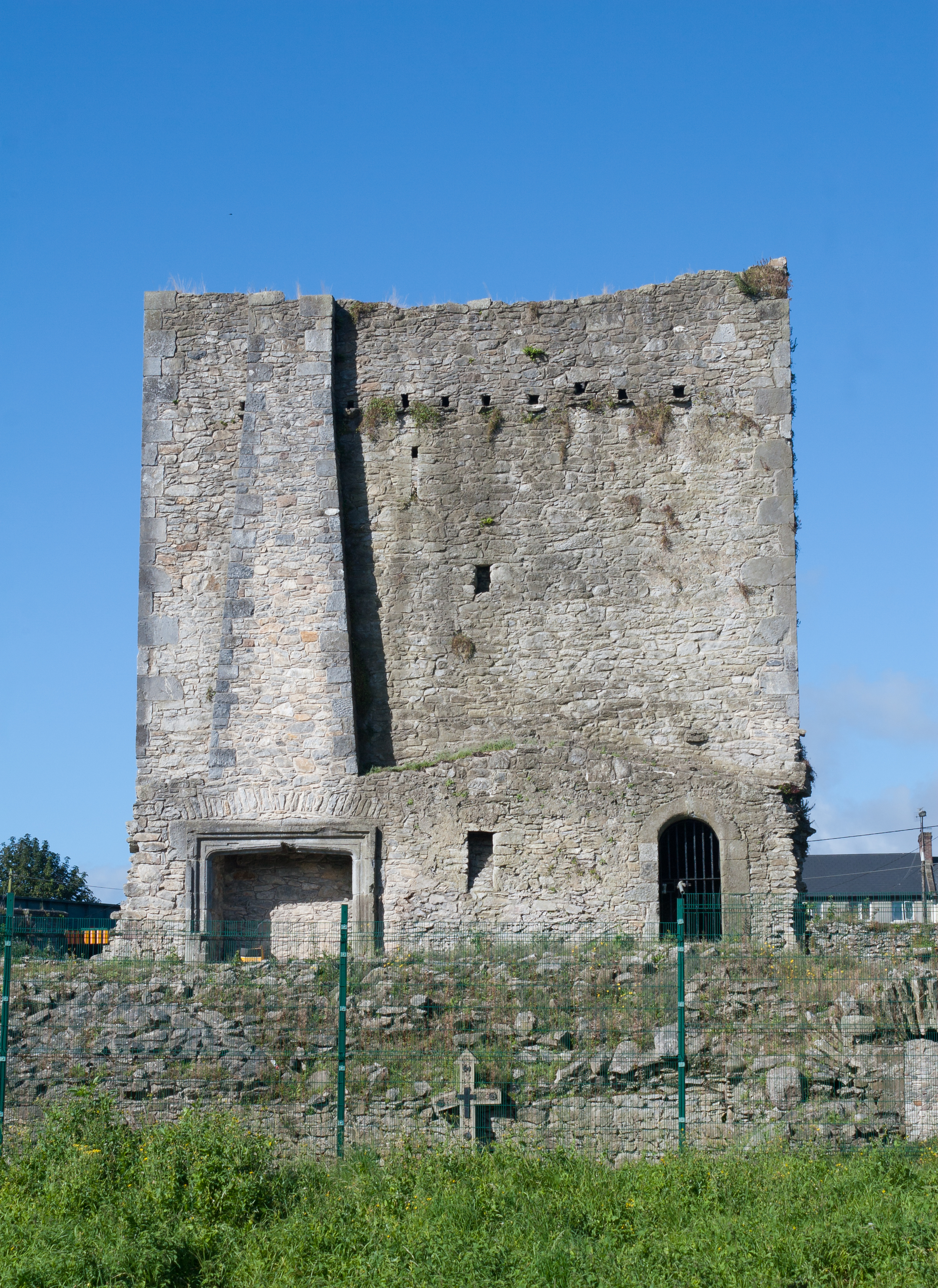
tower at the south-east corner of the cloister which was erected after the priory was dissolved
