= Theobald Butler, 5th Baron Cahir =

Irish peer

Theobald Butler, 5th Baron Cahir (died 27 September 1700) was an Irish peer and Jacobite.

Butler was the son of Edmund Butler, who was the third son of Theobald Butler, 1st Baron Cahir. On 30 January 1676, he succeeded his relative, Pierce Butler, as Baron Cahir in the Peerage of Ireland. At the Glorious Revolution in 1688, Butler supported James II of England and was summoned to attend the Irish House of Lords in the brief Patriot Parliament held in Dublin in 1689. For his Jacobitism, he was outlawed in 1691 and his estates were declared forfeit. He was restored partially to his estates in January 1692 by the provisions of the Treaty of Limerick.

Butler married twice; first to Mary Everard, a daughter of Sir Redmond Everard, 2nd Baronet, and second to Margaret Butler, a daughter of Pierce Butler, 4th Baron Cahir.

Peerage of Ireland
Preceded by Pierce Butler	Baron Cahir; 1676–1700	Succeeded by Thomas Butler
