= Kilcrohane =

Village in County Cork, Ireland

Kilcrohane Irish: Cill Chrócháin
- Village
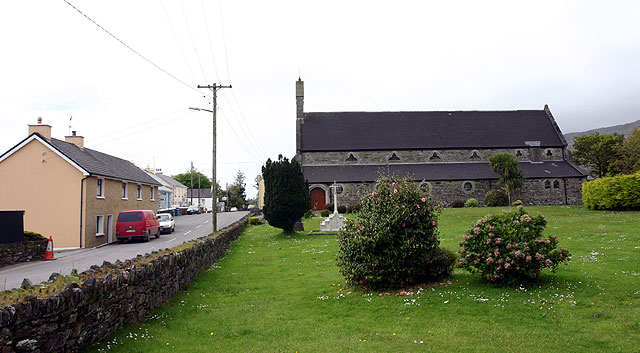
- Village and church

- Location in Ireland
- Coordinates: 51°34′52″N 09°42′12″W
- Country: Ireland
- Province: Munster
- County: County Cork

Population (2016)
  - Total: 127
- Time zone: UTC+0 (WET)
  - Summer (DST): UTC-1 (IST (WEST))

Kilcrohane (Irish: Cill Chrócháin) is a village in County Cork, Ireland. It is the last coastal village on the Sheep's Head Peninsula after Durrus and Ahakista. Kilcrohane lies under the 'Shadow of Seefin' (the area's highest hill) and is also close to Caher Mountain. The village overlooks Dunmanus Bay. The village is in a townland and civil parish of the same name.

== Cill Crochain ==
Cill Chrócháin is Irish for the 'church of Crochan'. Little is known about Crochan except that he is reputed to have lived around the time of Saint Patrick (mid 5th century). Some believe Crochan was from County Kerry, near Caherdaniel where there are two ruined churches named after him and a village also called Kilcrohane.

There is a ruined church in the grounds of the cemetery in Kilcrohane, thought to be where Crohan built his cell.

== Amenities ==
Kilcrohane has a primary school and a church. There is daily transportation to secondary schools in Bantry and public transportation to Allihies via Bantry four times daily. There is also a community field and hall and a children's playground with a tennis court.

The village has a pub, a café gallery, three restaurants and a seasonal coffee shop. The local shop is a post office and filling station. There is also a local co-operative shop.

== Tourism ==
The seaside village of Kilcrohane increases in population in the summer months. There are a number of bed and breakfasts, several self-catering holiday accommodations, and a garage/repair shop which rents bicycles.

The Alice West Centre, a museum focusing on the life and art of the late English-born artist Alice West, is open during the summer months and is run by the Muintir Bhaire Community Council. Alice West bequeathed her estate to the community, and the museum displays local artifacts, crafts, and artwork.

Kilcrohane is base for the Sheep's Head Way walking route. The area also has marked road cycling route.

The pier at Kilcrohane is used for swimming, and there are a number of private coves along the coast. There is pollock and mackerel in Dunmanus Bay.

== Festivals ==
Kilcrohane has a number of festivals throughout the year, including the 'Craic on the Coast' traditional music festival which takes place annually on Easter weekend. A 'Kilcrohane Carnival' is also held every year on the third week of July (depending on the weather). This carnival features a number of events, races, a track and field event, and fishing competition.

== Notable people ==
- Patrick Joseph Sullivan (1885–1935), U.S. Senator for Wyoming, was born in the area
- J. G. Farrell (1935–1979), writer, lived in Kilcrohane
- Denis O'Donovan (born 1955), senator, is from the area
- Ralph Fiennes (born 1962), actor, briefly lived here in the 1970s and attended Kilcrohane National School
- Christy Moore (born 1945), folk singer, had a property here
- Ivor Callely (born 1958), former politician and senator, also has a holiday residence here

== See also ==
- List of towns and villages in Ireland
