= Caher Mountain (Cork) =

Hill in County Cork, Ireland

- Cathair
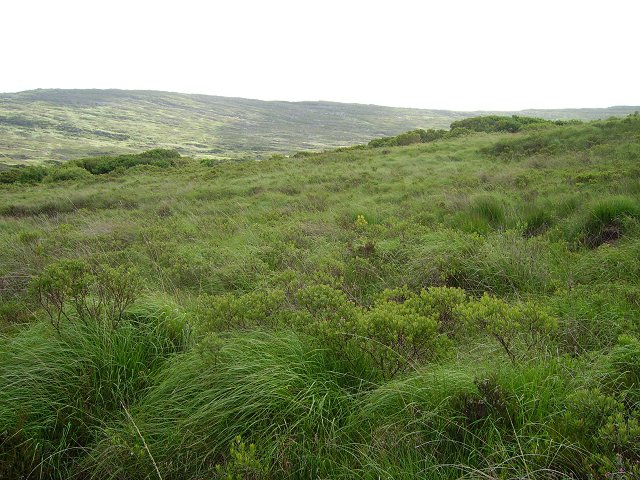
- Very rough hillside and bog running up to the summit of Caher Mountain

Highest point
- Elevation: 338 m (1,109 ft)
- Prominence: 143 m (469 ft)
- Coordinates: 51°34′56″N 9°44′32″W

Geography
- Location within island of Ireland
- Location: County Cork, Ireland
- Parent range: Sheep's Head peninsula

Caher Mountain (Irish: Cathair = "stone ring-fort") is a hill, 338 metres high, with views of the Sheep's Head peninsula, roughly west of and above the village of Kilcrohane in County Cork, Ireland.

== Location ==
Caher Mountain is located approximately 15 km from the end of the Sheep's Head peninsula and around 4 km west of Kilcrohane. Its neighbouring summit is Seefin (345 m), some 5 km to the northeast. It is at grid reference V793380 and can be reached on an easy walk from a lay-by about 1.5 km above the village.

== Views ==
In clear weather there are views as far as Dursey Island and the Iveragh Peninsula from Caher Mountain.
