= Earl of Glengall =

Title in the Peerage of Ireland

Earldom of Glengall
- Quarterly: first, or, a chief indented azure, in a canton argent, a cross, on three grieces, gules, thereon the crucification of the first: second, gules, three covered cups, or; third, ermine, a saltier gules; fourth, per pale indented, or and gules
- Creation date: 22 January 1816
- Created by: The Prince Regent (acting on behalf of his father King George III)
- Peerage: Peerage of Ireland
- First holder: Richard Butler, 10th Baron Cahir
- Last holder: Richard Butler, 2nd Earl of Glengall
- Remainder to: Heirs male of the first earl's body lawfully begotten
- Subsidiary titles: Viscount Cahir; Baron Cahir (Caher)
- Extinction date: 22 June 1858
- Former seats: Cahir Castle; Cahir House
- Motto: "God be my guide"

Earl of Glengall was a title in the Peerage of Ireland that was created in 1816 for Richard Butler, 10th Baron Cahir. The subsidiary title of Baron Cahir (also spelt Caher) in the Peerage of Ireland was first created in 1542 for Thomas Butler, who was a descendant of The 3rd Earl of Ormond. James "Gallda" Butler (from Irish gallda 'alien or Englishman') (died 1434) was the son of the 3rd Earl and Catherine FitzGerald of Desmond. "Gallda" Butler married a daughter of MacWalter and together they had one son, Piers (1425–1464). The title was re-created in 1583 with the unusual remainder to heirs general of the first baron, which made his great-nephews, Theobald Butler and Thomas Prendergast, co-heirs. Prendergast ceded the title to Theobald Butler, preferring that the title should follow the strict male line.

The 10th Baron was created Viscount Cahir and Earl of Glengall. The titles of Viscount and Earl became extinct on the death of the second Earl in June 1858. The title of Baron Cahir, which was created with remainder to heirs general, became abeyant and could potentially be claimed by descendants of Thomas Prendergast.

Cahir is a town in the barony of Iffa and Offa West, County Tipperary. It is famous for Cahir Castle.

== List of titleholders ==
=== Butler dynasty ===
James "Gallda" Butler (from Irish gallda 'foreigner or Englishman') (died 1434) was the son of James Butler, 3rd Earl of Ormond and Catherine FitzGerald of Desmond. From him springs the Cahir branch of the Butler family who were ennobled as Barons Cahir. He married a daughter of MacWalter, and together they had one son, Piers (1425–1464).

=== Barons Cahir, First creation (1542) ===
- Thomas Butler, 1st Baron Cahir, son of Thomas Butler of Cahir. His brother Piers would supply later barons when his own line failed to produce male heirs.
- Edmund Butler, 2nd Baron Cahir, son of the 1st Baron who died without issue.

=== Barons Cahir, Second creation (1583) ===
- Theobald Butler, 1st Baron Cahir, son of Piers Butler and nephew of the 1st Baron. He died in 1596 having had six sons of whom the three elder were Thomas, Piers and Edmund.
- Thomas Butler, 2nd Baron Cahir, son of the 1st Baron. Died without male issue in 1627.
- Thomas Butler, 3rd Baron Cahir, son of Piers Butler, nephew of the 2nd Baron and grandson of the 1st Baron.
- Pierce Butler, 4th Baron Cahir, grandson of the 3rd Baron. Pierce's father, Edmund, predeceased the 3rd Baron. He died in 1676 without male issue.
- Theobald Butler, 5th Baron Cahir, the son of Edmund who was the third son of the 1st Baron. He succeeded on the extinction of the line of the 1st Lord's second son. He died in 1700.
- Thomas Butler, 6th Baron Cahir, son of the 5th Baron.
- James Butler, 7th Baron Cahir, son of the 6th Baron who succeeded in 1744 and died without issue in 1746.
- Pierce Butler, 8th Baron Cahir, brother of the 7th Baron. He died without issue on 10 June 1788, ending the line of Theobald.
- James Butler, 9th Baron Cahir, son of Richard Butler of Ballinahinch (or Ballynahinch) who was the grandson of the above Edmund, (i.e. Richard was the great-grandson of the 1st Baron). He was in India at the time of his predecessor's death and so never received the news of his elevation as he died a month later in July 1788.
- Richard Butler, 10th Baron Cahir, son of the 9th Baron (created Viscount Cahir and Earl of Glengall in 1816).

=== Earls of Glengall (1816) ===
- Richard Butler, 1st Earl of Glengall and 10th Baron Cahir (1775–1819), was the son of the 9th Baron. He died in 1819.
- Richard Butler, 2nd Earl of Glengall and 11th Baron Cahir (1794–1858). The titles became extinct at the death of the second Earl who was buried in the Church of Ireland church, Cahir built by John Nash.

== See also ==
- Butler dynasty
