= St. Mary's Church, New Ross =

- St. Mary's Abbey
- Séipéal Mhuire
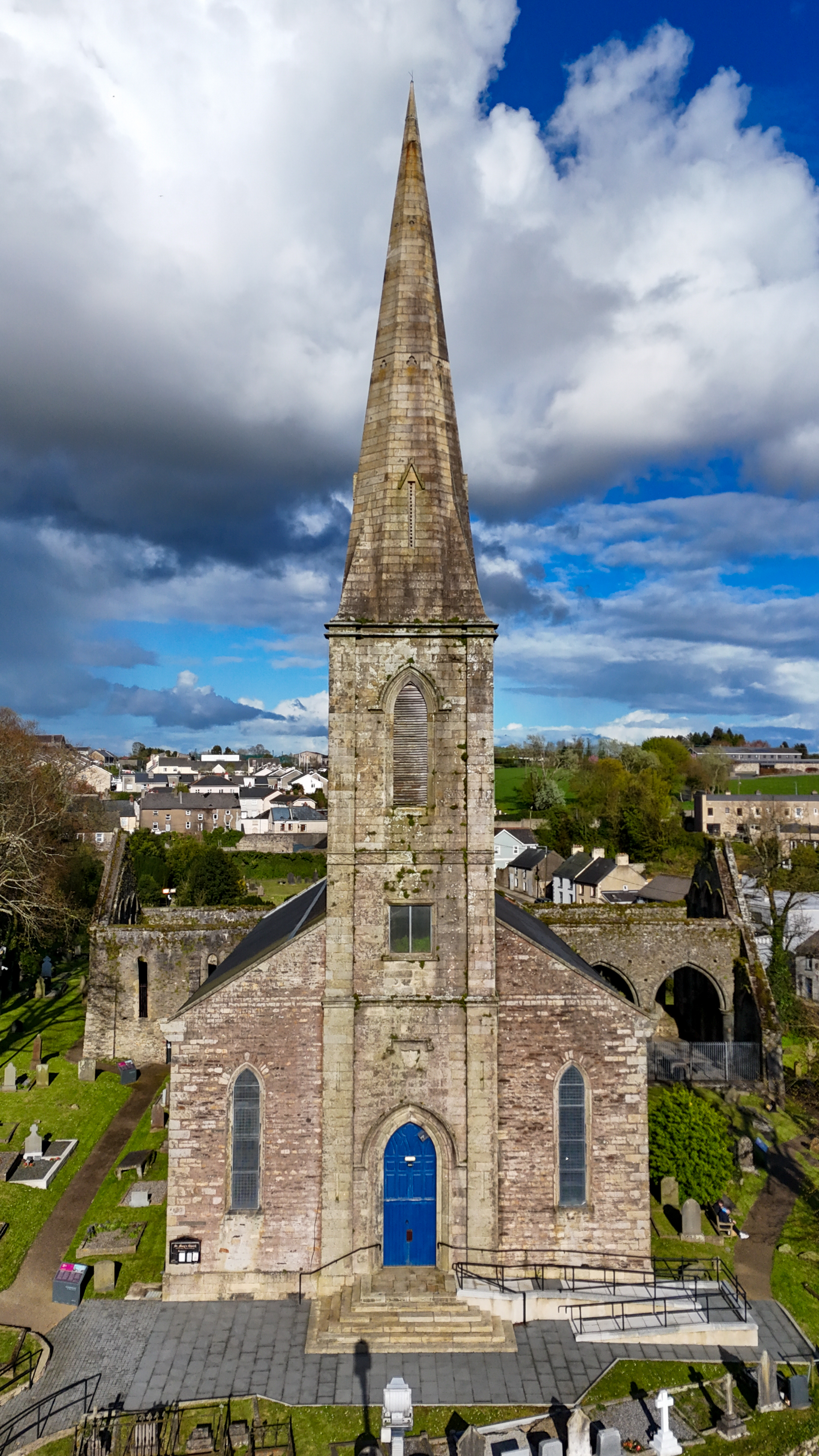

- Location within Ireland
- 52.396258°N 6.940464°W
- Location: Mary Street, New Ross, County Wexford
- Country: Ireland
- Denomination: Church of Ireland
- Previous denomination: Pre-Reformation Catholic

History
- Status: ruined
- Founder(s): William Marshal, 1st Earl of Pembroke; Isabel de Clare
- Dedication: Mary, mother of Jesus

Architecture
- Functional status: inactive
- Style: Norman, Gothic
- Completed: 1210

Specifications
- Materials: sandstone, Dundry stone

Administration
- Province: Dublin
- Diocese: Ferns

National monument of Ireland
- Official name: St. Mary's Church
- Reference no.: 443

St. Mary's Church is a medieval church and National Monument in New Ross, Ireland.

== Location ==
St. Mary's Church is located on Mary Street, New Ross, on the east bank of the River Barrow.

== History ==
Abbán built a monastery in the New Ross area in the 6th century, possibly on the site where St. Mary's was later built.

St. Mary's was completed in 1210 and was founded by William Marshal, 1st Earl of Pembroke or his wife Isabel de Clare, a daughter of Strongbow.

The bells were stolen in 1654 by a Lieut.-Col. Beale, during the Irish Confederate Wars. Divine Service was performed at St. Mary's until 1811 or 1812, when the west aisle was demolished to make room for the modern church.

Many stories are associated locally with the ruins, including one about a soldier who entered the "Black Hole" under an archway with his dog; only the dog returned. In another, a man who attempted to take the cross out of the old chancel had his brains dashed out.

== Church ==
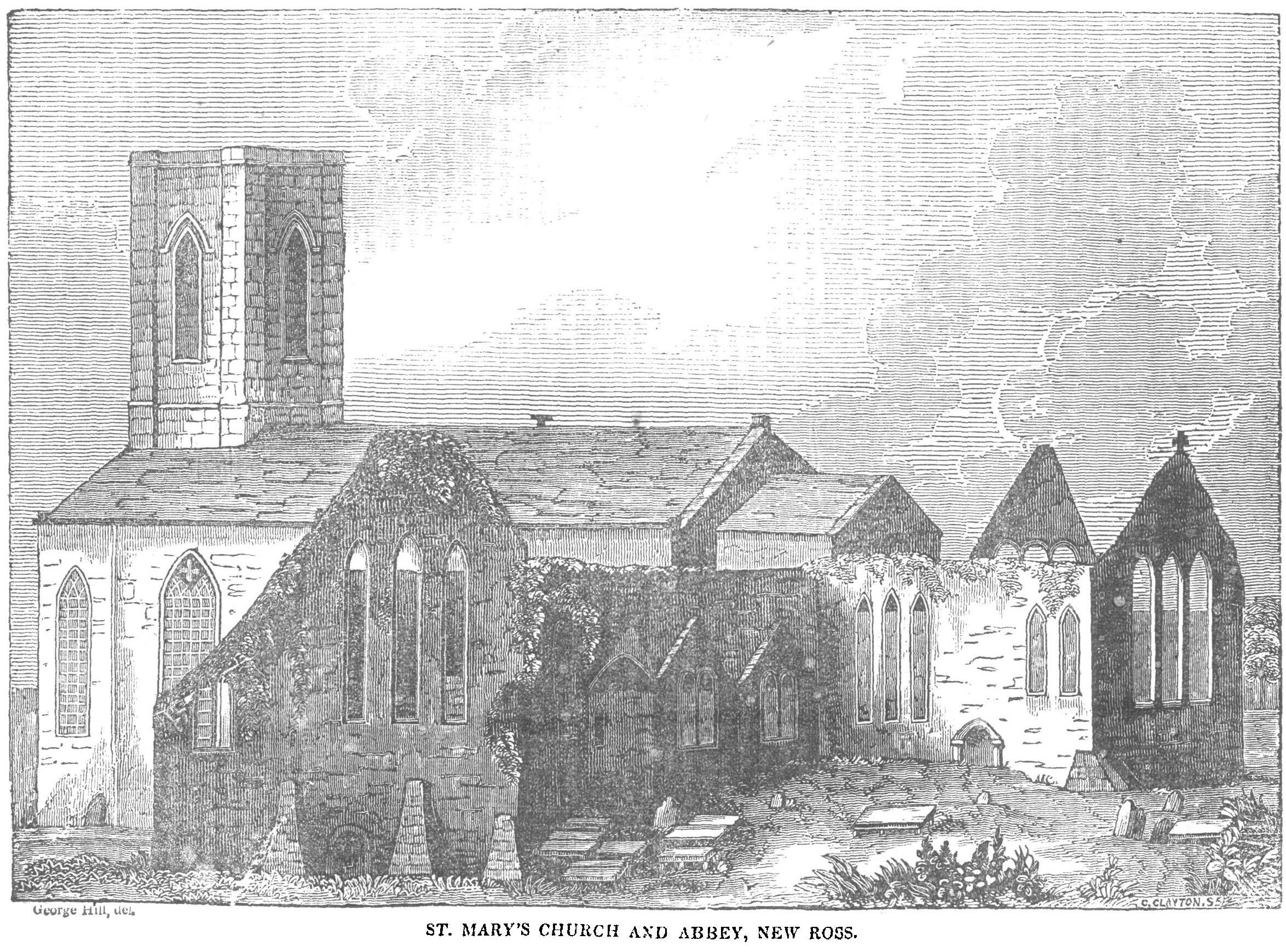
Church and Ruins, 1835, Dublin Penny Journal

The present Church of Ireland building occupies the site of the nave of the old building; only the chancel and transepts survive. The chancel has an aumbry, sedilia, piscina, tomb canopy and two doorways: one transitional and one Gothic.

There are three lancet windows in the east gable. The old chancel and the north and south transepts contain one of Ireland's largest collections of medieval funerary. One features a cross with Lamb of God, symbolism associated with the Knights Templar. Another rarity is a woman buried next to both of her husbands, a rarity in the Middle Ages.

== Gallery ==
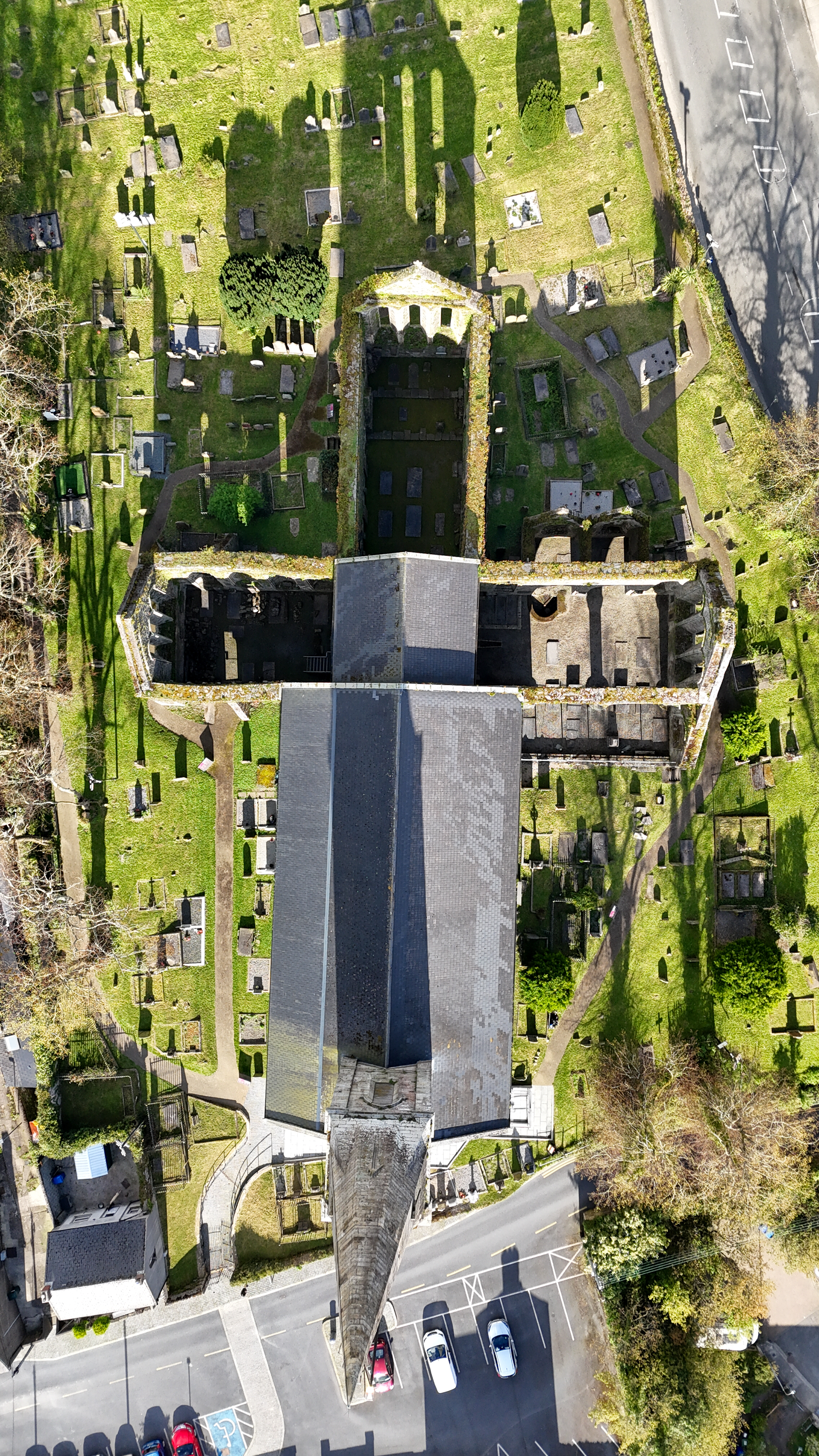

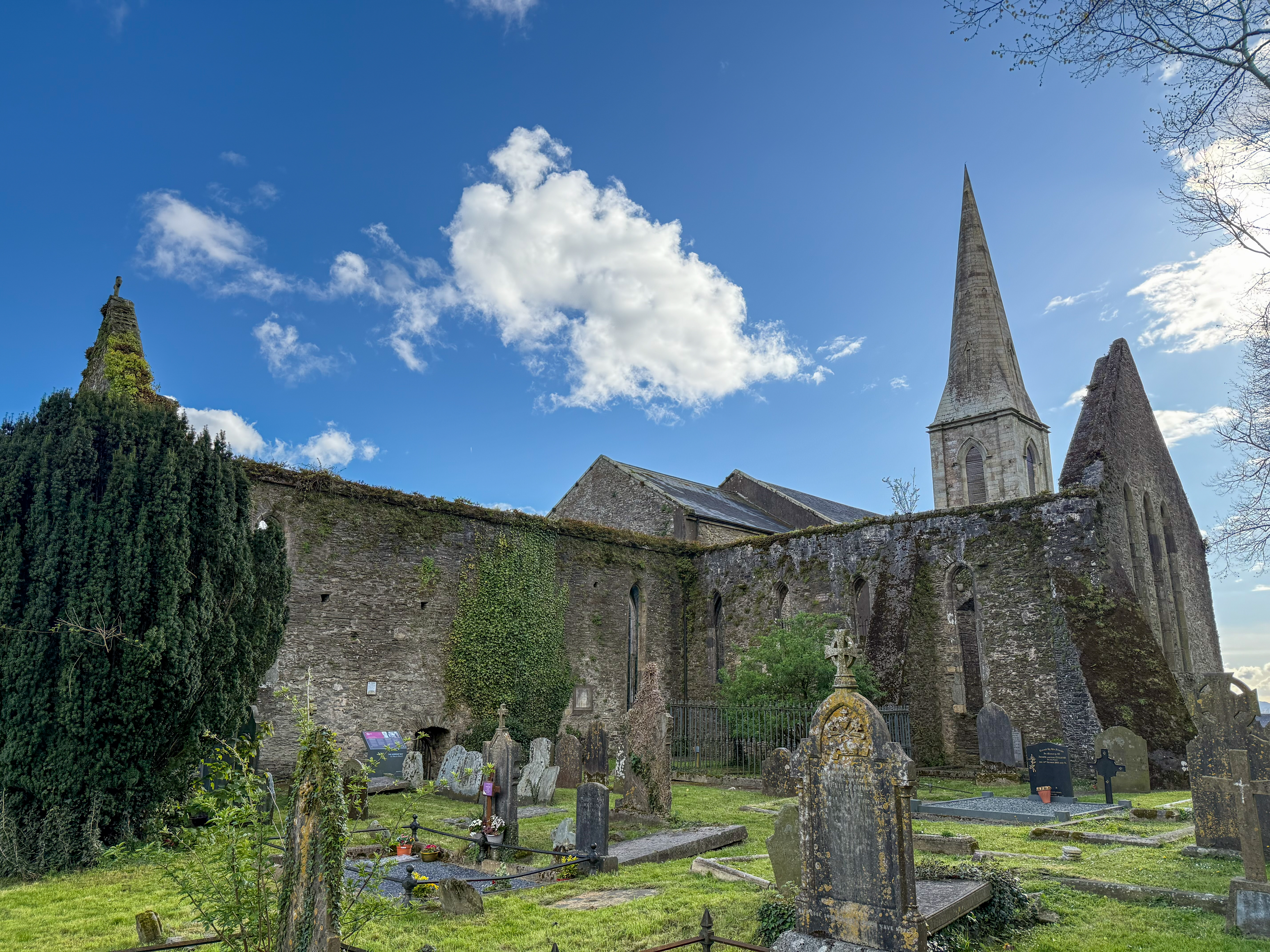

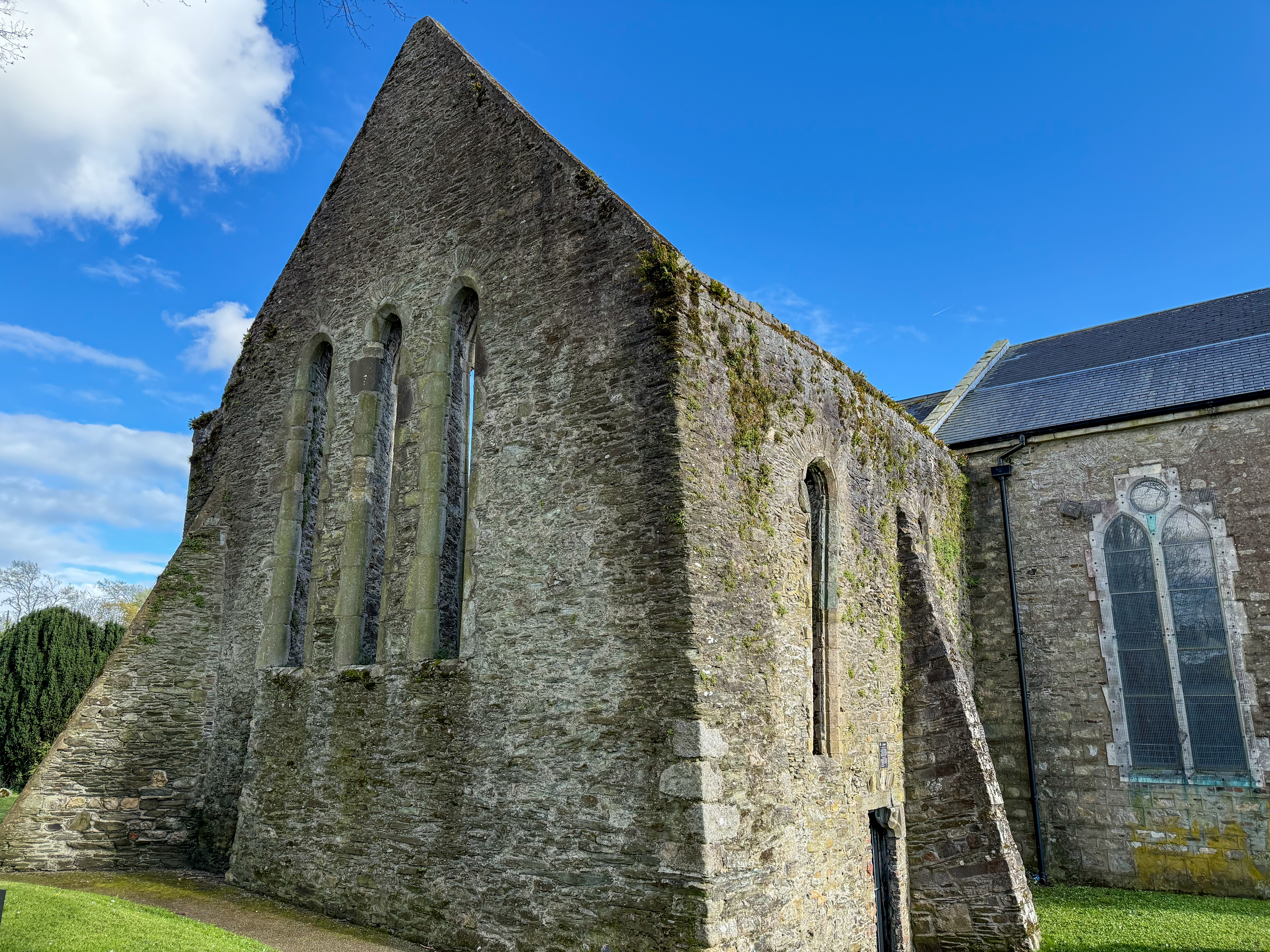

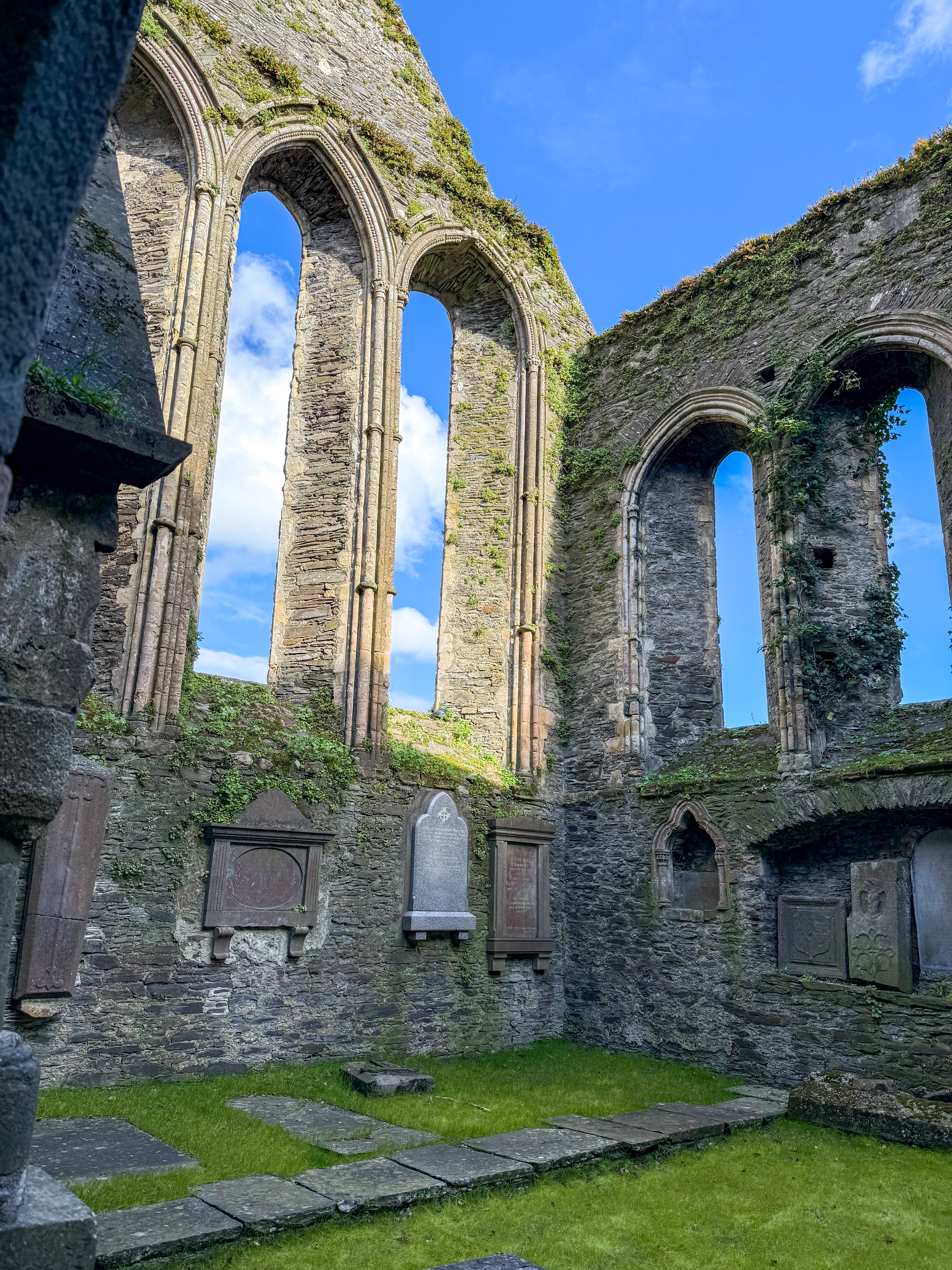
