= Cahir =

Town in County Tipperary, Ireland

Cahir An Chathair/Cathair Dhún Iascaigh
- Town
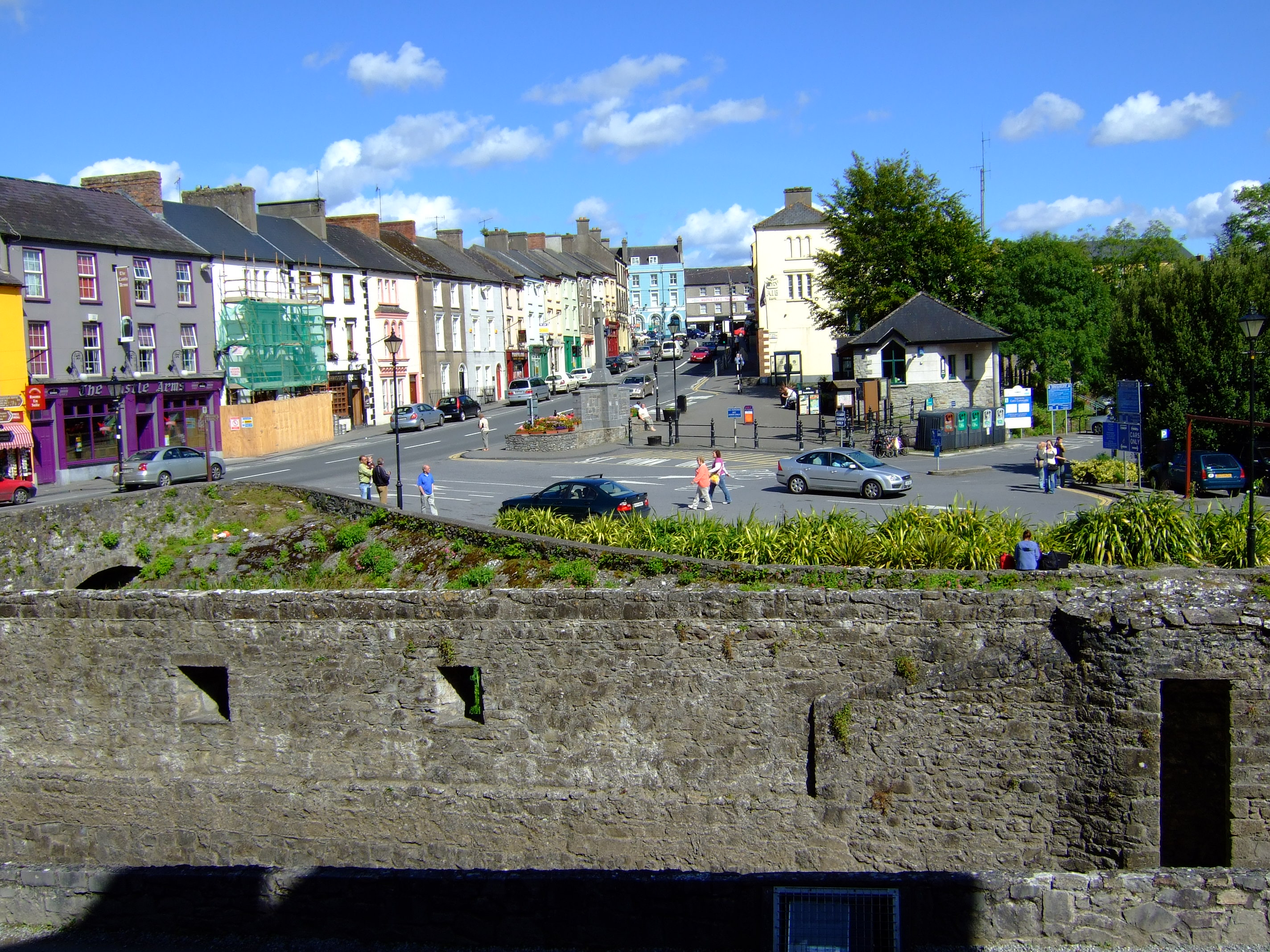
- Castle Street

- Location in Ireland
- Coordinates: 52.375°N 7.925°W
- Country: Ireland
- Province: Munster
- County: Tipperary
- Dáil Éireann: Tipperary South
- Elevation: 50 m (160 ft)

Population (2022)
  - Total: 3,679
- Dialing code: 052 744, +000 353 (0)52 744
- Irish Grid Reference: S051252

Historical population
Year	Pop.	±%
1821	3,288	—
1831	3,408	+3.6%
1841	3,668	+7.6%
1851	3,694	+0.7%
1861	2,926	−20.8%
1871	2,694	−7.9%
1881	2,469	−8.4%
1891	2,046	−17.1%
1901	2,058	+0.6%
1911	1,930	−6.2%
1926	1,709	−11.5%
1936	1,638	−4.2%
1946	1,652	+0.9%
1951	1,589	−3.8%
1956	1,731	+8.9%
1961	1,662	−4.0%
1966	1,740	+4.7%
1971	1,747	+0.4%
1981	2,120	+21.4%
1986	2,118	−0.1%
1991	2,055	−3.0%
1996	2,236	+8.8%
2002	2,794	+25.0%
2006	3,381	+21.0%
2011	3,578	+5.8%
2016	3,593	+0.4%
2022	3,679	+2.4%

Cahir (/ˈkɛər/; Irish: an Chathair / Cathair Dhún Iascaigh) is a town in County Tipperary in Ireland. It is also a civil parish in the barony of Iffa and Offa West.

== Location and access ==
For much of the twentieth century, Cahir stood at an intersection of two busy national roadways: the Dublin to Cork N8, and the Limerick to Waterford N24. The N8 was realigned in 1991 to run west of the town, while the old road through it was renumbered the R670. Traffic from the N24 still left the town badly congested, however, until October 2007 when this road was also realigned to bypass Cahir to the north and east. The same road improvement scheme saw major changes to the N8 corridor: a new motorway, the M8, was constructed west of the town between 2006 and 2008. Access to Cahir from this motorway is gained at Junctions 10 and 11.

Cahir is on the Limerick–Waterford railway line. The town's railway station opened on 1 May 1852. There are two trains a day to Tipperary and Limerick Junction and two to Clonmel, Carrick on Suir and Waterford. There is no Sunday service.

Bus Éireann runs regular services to Dublin, Cork, Limerick and Waterford through the town.

== History ==
The name Cathair or an Chathair translates as "stone ringfort", while the name Cathair Dhún Iascaigh means "town of the fort of the fishery". In older accounts, it was often spelled "Caher". Cahir Abbey was established in the late 12th century.

For much of its history, the town has been influenced by the Butler family. It was from this family that the first Barons of Cahir were created. It was known for much of its history as being a defence town.

Cahir, together with Clonmel, were the centres in South Tipperary of the Quaker population, who constructed a meeting house in Abbey Street in 1833. The principal Quaker family names, largely engaged in milling, were Grubb, Going and Walpole. It was one of the first towns to be linked by stagecoach in the nineteenth century, when Charles Bianconi commenced services between Clonmel, Cahir and Cashel. The building at The Square, where The Galtee Inn is now sited, was the stopping point in the town for Bianconi's coaches.

== Amenities and features ==
Cahir Castle, which is situated on a small island in the River Suir, is one of the town's main tourist attractions. Cahir has a fine Church of Ireland parish church, still in use, designed by John Nash, one of only three ecclesiastical buildings he designed in Ireland. Another major attraction is the Swiss Cottage; there are also numerous specialty heritage walks. The nearby Galtee Mountains form the largest inland range in Ireland and are home to Glengarra Wood, which is a popular walking area. The Knockmealdown Mountains stand south of the town, while to the southwest lie the Mitchelstown Caves. The salmon weir, on the opposite side of the bridge from the castle, is a popular fishing location.

Cahir is a small heritage town. A shopping precinct is centred on the town square adjacent to Castle Street. The town has a leisure centre (Duneske), an all-weather soccer pitch, all-weather tennis courts, a Downhill and Enduro mountain-biking track and a GAA pitch. An 18-hole golf course lies outside the town.

== Education ==
Schools in the town include Bunscoil na Cathrach (Primary School) and Coláiste Dún Iascaigh (Secondary School). Our Lady of Mercy Primary School and Cahir Boys National School merged in 2022 to form Bunscoil na Cathrach.

== Sports ==
Cahir has a number of teams in various sports. Cahir GAA are the local Gaelic team and play on the GAA pitch located on the Ardfinnan road. They were Tipperary Senior Football Champions in 2003. Cahir Park AFC are the local junior soccer team. Formed in 1910, they are one of the oldest junior soccer teams in the country. Their ground is also located in Cahir Park on the Ardfinnan road.

== International relations ==
Cahir has been twinned with the town of Scarborough in England since 2003.

== Notable people ==
- Richard Butler, 2nd Earl of Glengall
- John Noel Dempsey (1915–89), Connecticut politician
- William Joshua Ffennell (1799–1867), Irish fishery reformer
- Edmund Keating Hyland (1780–1845), uilleann piper; his statue in Cahir main square
- Michael Murphy (1831–93), awarded Victoria Cross, later forfeited
- Tommy O'Donnell, Munster and Ireland rugby player
- Richard Pennefather, Irish judge, buried Cahir
- Marian Tobin (1870–1955) ran a safe house during the Irish War of Independence
- Will Fleury, Irish professional mixed martial artist
- The 2 Johnnies, Irish comedy duo, broadcasters and musicians

== Image gallery ==
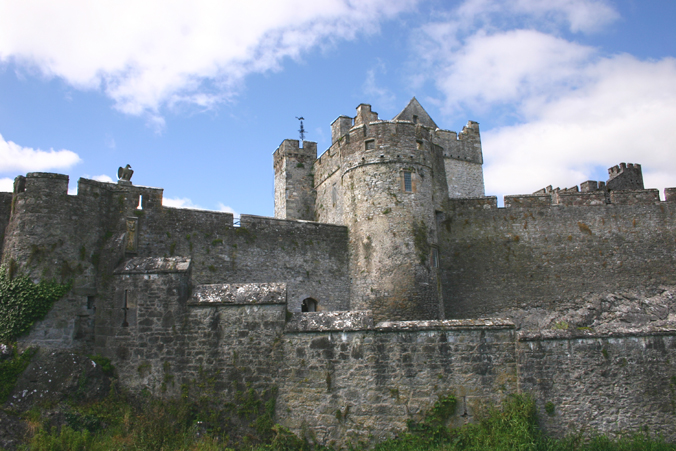
Cahir Castle

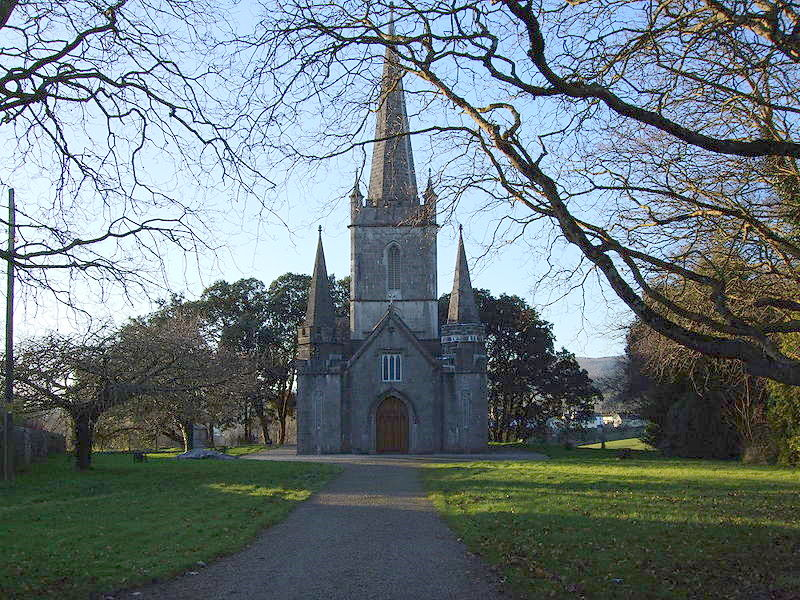
The Church of Ireland parish church in Cahir.

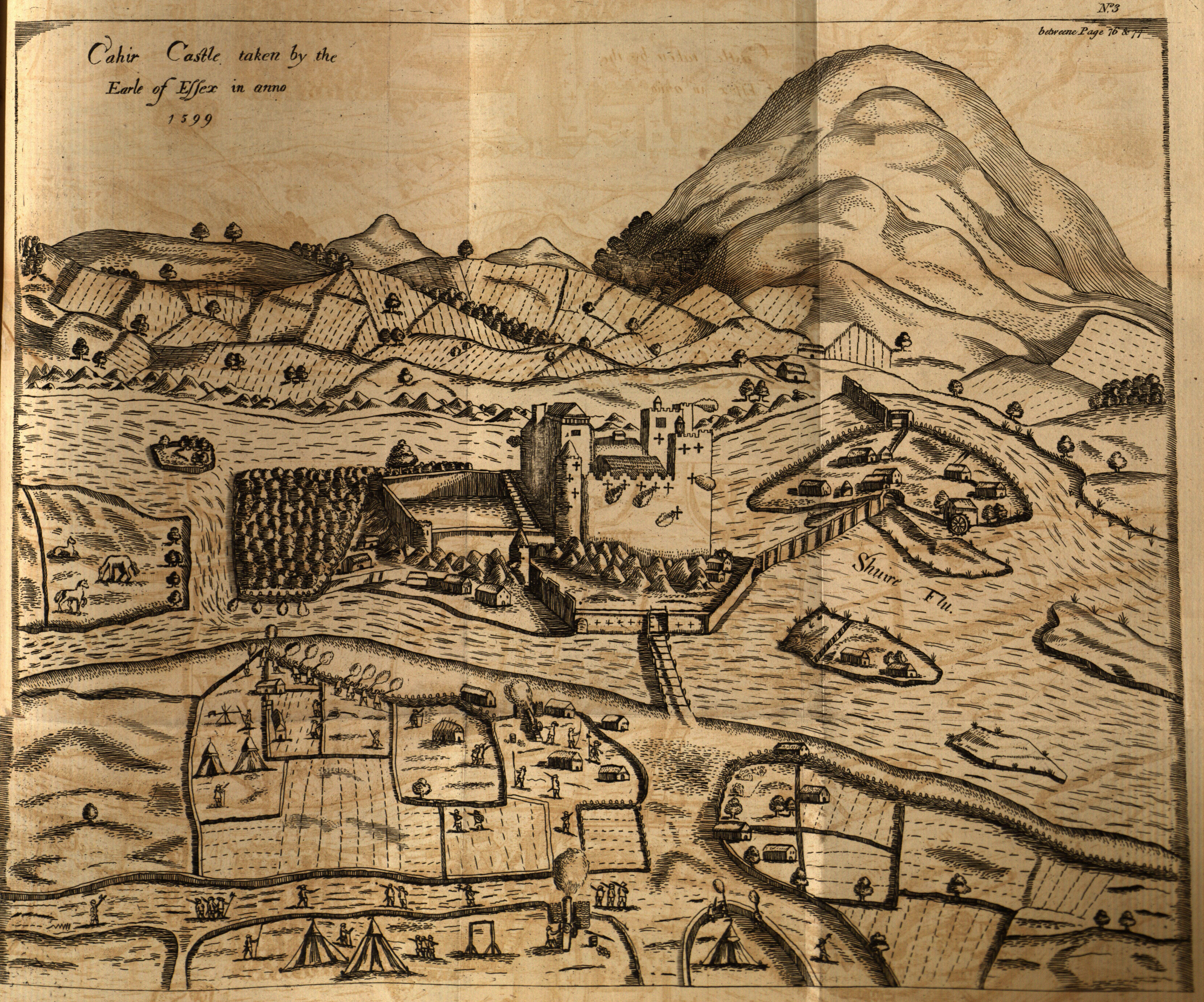
A drawing of Cahir in 1599

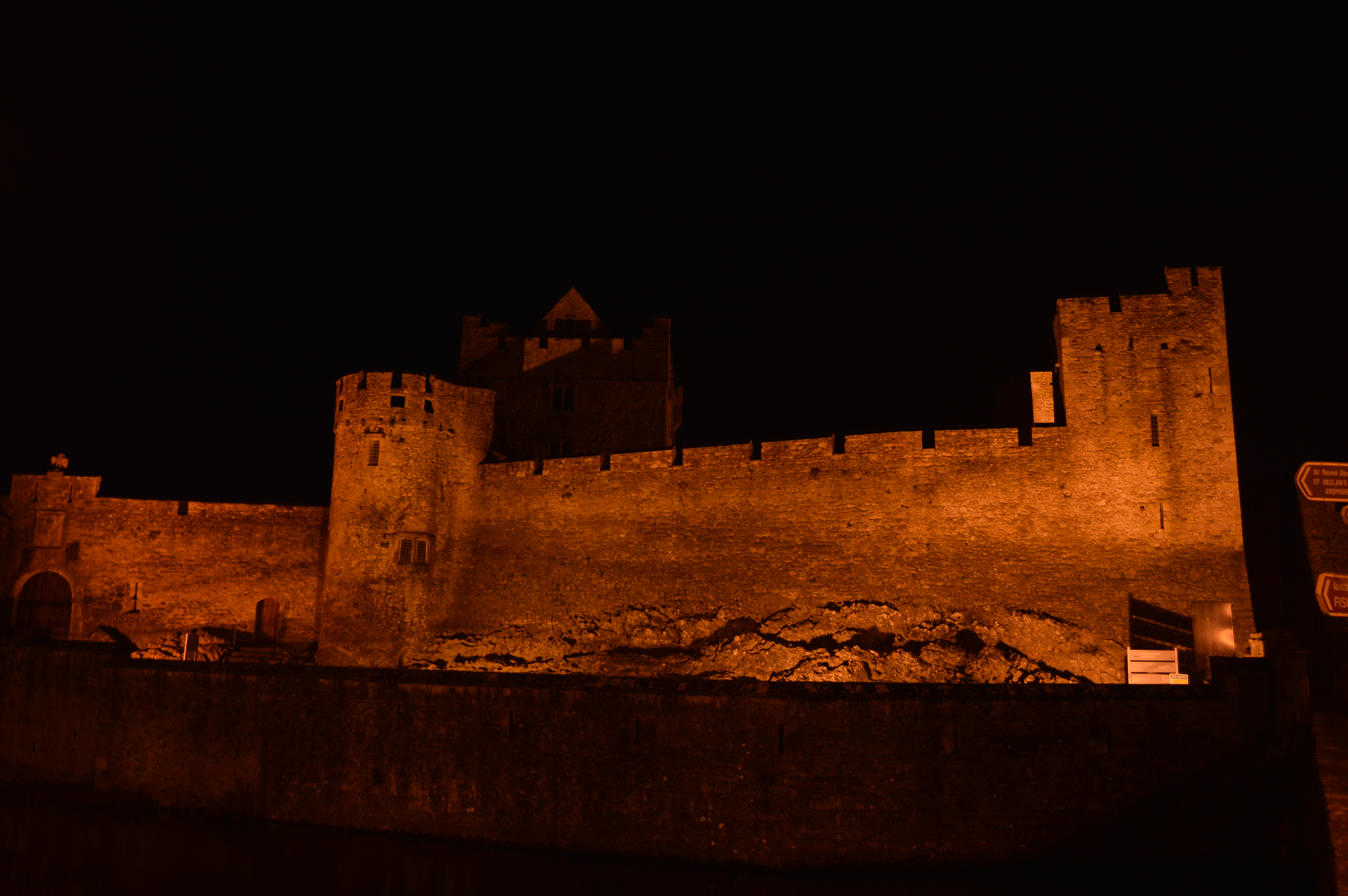
Cahir Castle, Tipperary, lit up at night.

== See also ==
- List of towns in Ireland
- Market Houses in Ireland
