= Cahir Castle =

Castle in County Tipperary, Ireland

Cahir Castle
- County Tipperary; Near Cahir in Ireland
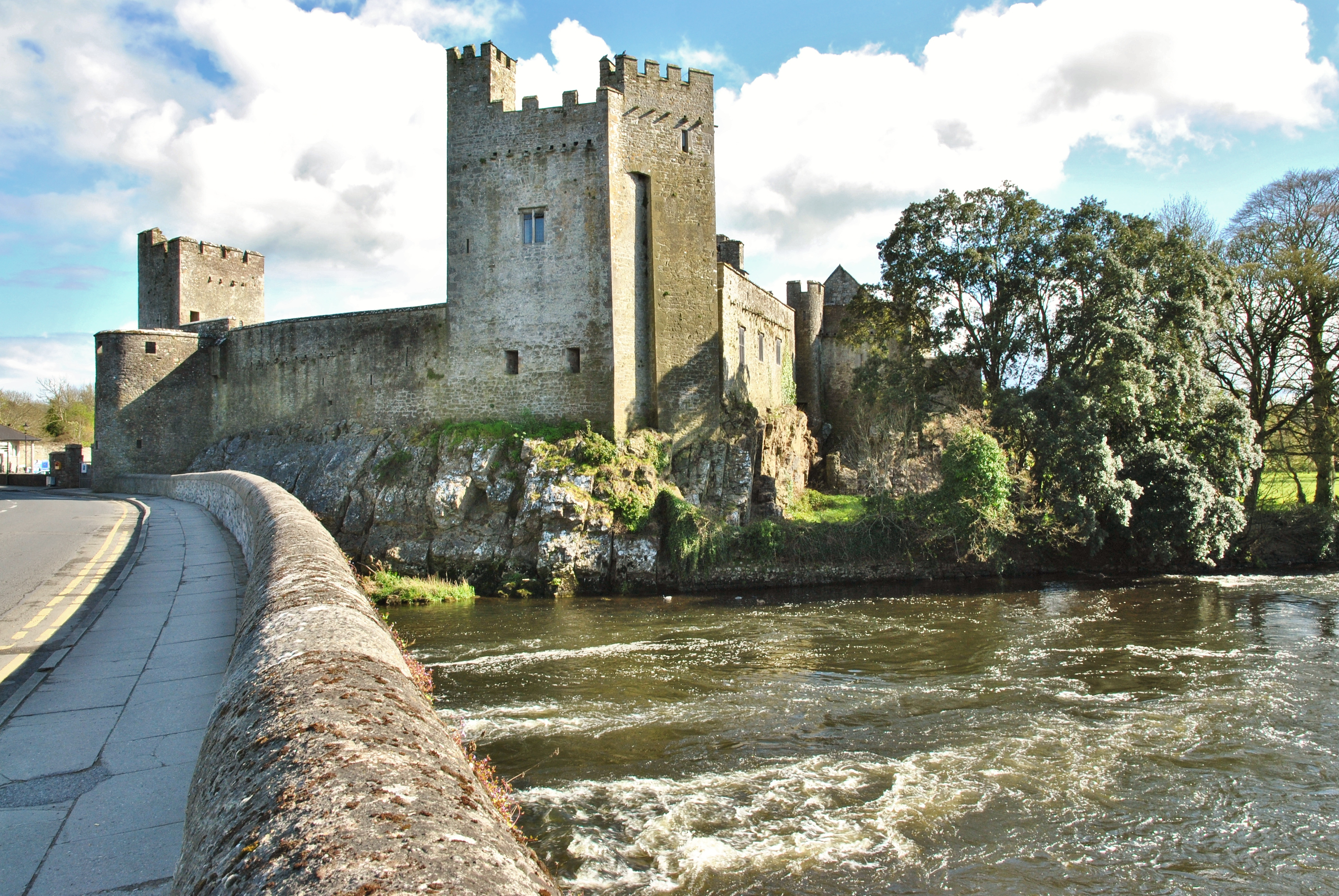

Site information
- Type: Castle
- Owner: Office of Public Works
- Open to the public: Yes
- Condition: Standing
- Website: Heritage Ireland

Location
- Location in Ireland
- Coordinates: 52°22′28″N 7°55′38″W

Site history
- Built: 13th Century
- Built by: O'Briens
- In use: 13th Century-1800s
- Fate: Preserved
- Battles/wars: Cromwellian Conquest of Ireland

National monument of Ireland
- Official name: Cahir Castle
- Reference no.: 507

Cahir Castle (Irish: Caisleán na Cathrach), one of the largest castles in Ireland, is sited on an island in the river Suir. It was built from 1142 by Conchobar Ua Briain, King of Thomond. Now situated in Cahir town centre, County Tipperary, the castle is well preserved and has guided tour and audiovisual shows in multiple languages.

== Construction ==
The castle was sited on and near an earlier native fortification known as a cathair (stone fort), which gave its name to the place. This stood in opposition to Norman expansion northward from Ardfinnan Castle, four miles south. The core structure of the castle dates to construction in the 13th century by the O'Brien family. The castle was built in two parts, with the side now by the street being built 200 years before the side now housing the audio-visual show.

Granted to the powerful Butler family in the late 14th century, the castle was enlarged and remodelled between the 15th and 17th centuries. It fell into ruin in the late 18th century and was partially restored in the 1840s. The Great Hall was partly rebuilt in 1840.

== History ==
In 1375, the castle was granted to James Butler, newly created Earl of Ormond, for his loyalty to Edward III, King of England. His son James, the second Earl (by his second marriage) passed the lands around the barony of Iffa and Offa West to his children, though they were not themselves noble. This changed by 1542 when the first of the Barons Cahir was created. Unlike their Anglican kinsmen, this branch of the Butler dynasty sided with the Roman Catholic Irish in the Elizabethan wars. In 1599, the castle was captured after a three-day siege by the army of the Earl of Essex and was, for a year, put under the charge of Sir Charles Blount. Lord Cahir joined with the Earl of Tyrone in 1601 and was attainted for treason, but later obtained a full pardon. In 1627, the castle was the scene of a celebrated killing when Cahir's son-in-law, Lord Dunboyne, murdered his distant cousin, James Prendergast, in a dispute over an inheritance: he was tried for the killing but acquitted.

During the Irish Confederate Wars, the castle was besieged twice. In 1647, George Mathew, the guardian of the young Lord Cahir, surrendered to Murrough O'Brien, 6th Baron Inchiquin (later 1st Earl, and a descendant of Cahir's builder) following his victory at the Battle of Knocknanauss. In 1650, he surrendered again to Oliver Cromwell during his conquest of Ireland without a shot being fired. In March 1653, as the fight against Cromwell's conquest of Ireland was collapsing, Edmund O'Dwyer met the English Colonel Jerome Sankey at the castle and they agreed a treaty for the surrender of the Irish forces in County Tipperary and County Waterford two weeks later.

After the death of Richard Butler Charteris, the last resident representative of the Butler-Charteris family at Cahir in 1961, the Cahir estate was broken up and sold. Cahir Castle was subsequently acquired by the Irish state, restored by the Office of Public Works, and opened to the public in 1971.

== Protection and tourism ==
Cahir Castle was designated a National Monument of Ireland in 1964. Since then, it has been managed by the Office of Public Works, which maintains the castle and conducts guided tours.

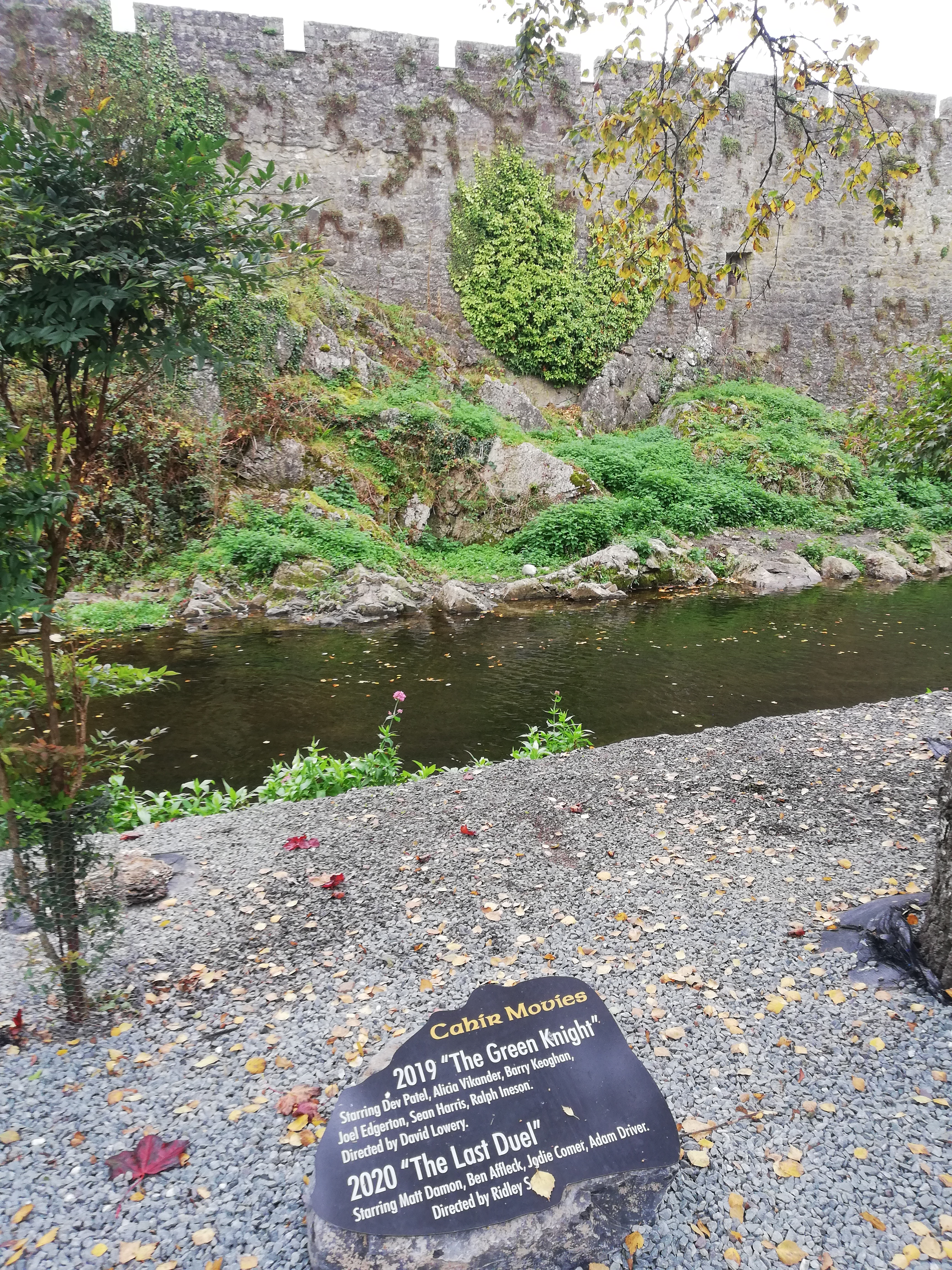
Plaque commemorating the use of the castle as a filming location.

The interior shots of the Abbey in the 1973 television film The Conflict, were filmed at the castle. In 1981, it was used as a location for a battle scene in the film Excalibur. In 1998, the site was used as a location for the series Mystic Knights of Tir Na Nog.

The castle was also used as a location for television series The Tudors. In 2019, it was used as a location for the film The Green Knight and in 2020 for the film The Last Duel.

== Gallery ==
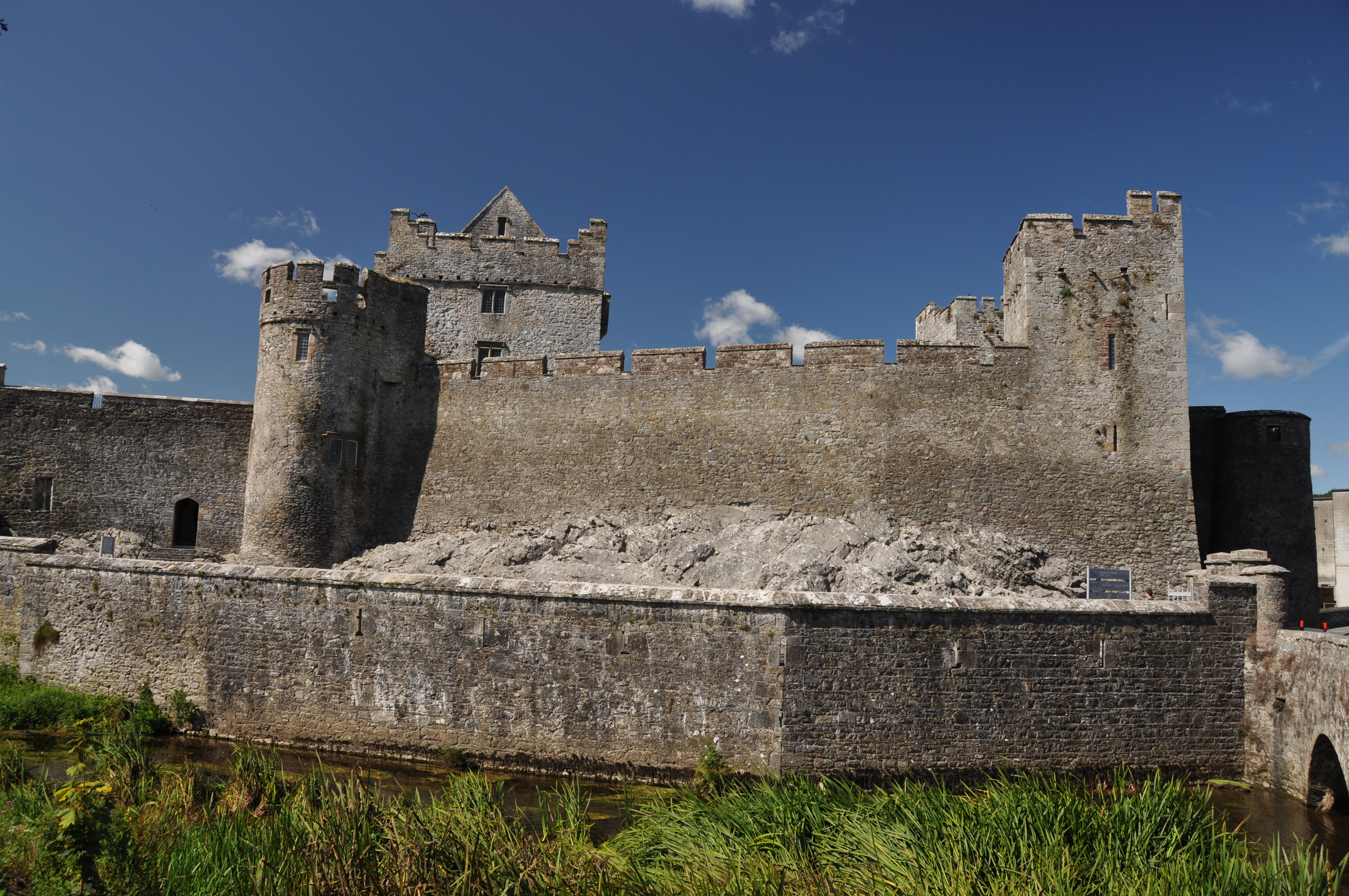
Exterior of the castle

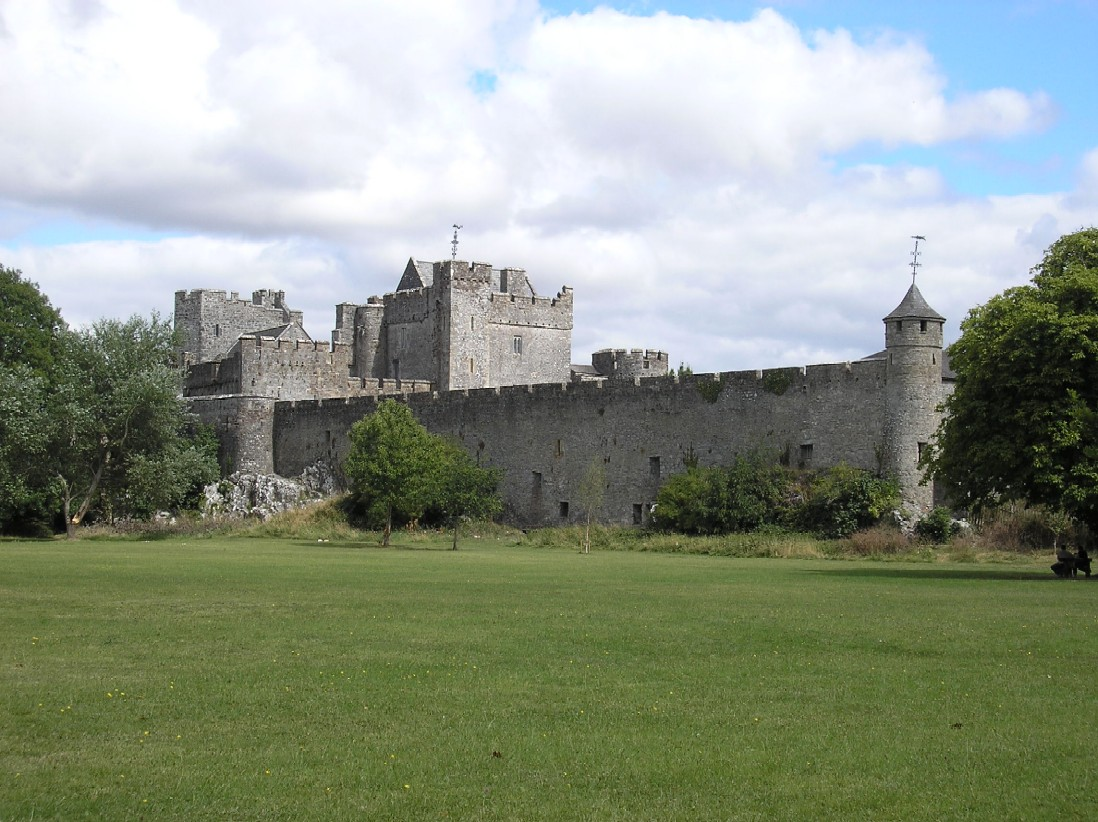
Walls and demesne

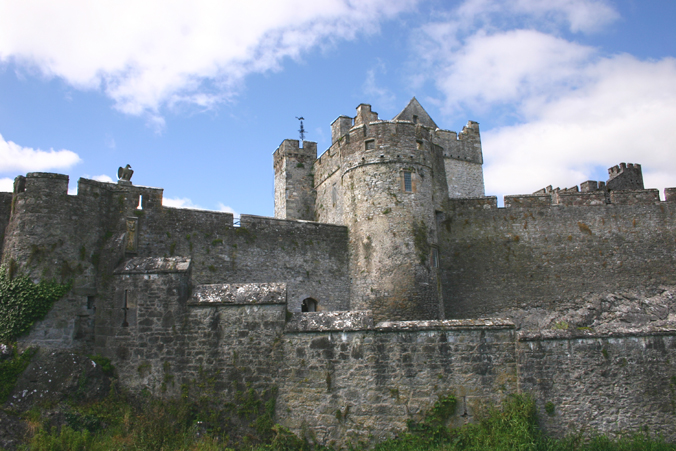
Exterior walls
