= Dunsany =

Dunsany may refer to:

- Dunsany Castle and Demesne, County Meath, Ireland
- Baron of Dunsany, "Lord Dunsany" or "Dunsany", the holders of the Dunsany estate
- Dunsany, County Meath, a townland and hamlet, named for the adjacent castle and demesne
- Christopher Plunkett, 1st Baron of Dunsany (1410–1463), Irish peer
- Edward Plunkett, 18th Baron of Dunsany, the writer and playwright "Lord Dunsany"
- Dunsany's Chess, an asymmetric variant of chess created by Lord Dunsany
- Horace Plunkett, first head of the Department of Agriculture in Ireland and the pioneer of the cooperative movement there
- Randal Plunkett, 21st Baron of Dunsany, rewilding advocate and film director
