= Edward Plunkett (disambiguation) =

Edward Plunkett, 18th Baron of Dunsany (1878–1957), was an Anglo-Irish writer and dramatist.

Edward Plunkett may also refer to:

- Edward Plunkett, 4th Baron of Dunsany (died 1521)
- Edward Plunkett, 12th Baron of Dunsany (1713–1781)
- Edward Plunkett, 14th Baron of Dunsany (1773–1848)
- Edward Plunkett, 16th Baron of Dunsany (1808–1889)
- Edward Plunkett, 20th Baron of Dunsany (1939–2011)
