= Maria Alice de Marsillac Plunkett =

Brazilian-Irish architect, designer and châtelaine (1942–2020)

- Born: Maria Alice Villela de Carvalho; 27 January 1942; Rio de Janeiro, Brazil
- Died: 9 April 2020 (aged 78); Navan, County Meath, Ireland
- Resting place: Church of St. Nicholas, Dunsany Estate
- Other name: Maria Alice de Marsillac
- Education: Federal University of Rio de Janeiro
- Occupations: Architect; designer; châtelaine
- Spouses: Jayme de Marsillac (divorced) Edward Plunkett, 20th Baron of Dunsany (died 2011)
- Children: 4, including Randal Plunkett, 21st Baron of Dunsany
- Relatives: Randal Plunkett, 19th Baron of Dunsany (father-in-law)

Maria Alice de Marsillac Plunkett, Lady Dunsany (née Villela de Carvalho; 27 January 1942 – 9 April 2020) was a Brazilian-Irish architect, designer and châtelaine of Dunsany Castle, one of Ireland's longest-occupied homes. De Marsillac Plunkett worked as an architect in Brazil, the US, Ireland and the UK.

== Early life and education ==
Maria Alice Villela de Carvalho was born on 27 January 1942 in Rio de Janeiro to Scipião de Carvalho (died c. 1959), a colonel in the Brazilian army and later architect, and Arminda Bandeira de Villela, who claimed descent from Pedro Álvares Cabral and Vasco da Gama. The youngest of three siblings, De Carvalho was a member of the Brazilian Villela and Bandeiro de Mello families.

Educated at home, then at the Instituto de Educação do Rio de Janeiro, De Carvalho later studied architecture at the Federal University of Rio de Janeiro. Graduating with distinction, De Carvalho also won first prize in an architectural competition adjudicated by Oscar Niemeyer. She later studied French literature at the Sorbonne University and at the Ecole du Louvre.

== Career ==
In Rio de Janeiro, de Carvalho founded her own architecture firm. Notable designs from this period include the São Conrado Fashion Mall and the Edifício Villa D'Este Ipanema.

In the early 1980s, De Marsillac relocated to New York where she founded an architecture firm. During this period, she met her future second husband Edward Plunkett (later 20th Baron of Dunsany) who had moved to the city in 1977, and who come to work for her. Subsequent to their marriage, the firm was renamed De Marsillac Plunkett Architecture and the couple worked together, with Plunkett working primarily as a designer, with De Marsillac Plunkett as president and working primarily as an architect. One notable commission was a refurbishment of Sotheby's New York headquarters.

In 1991, the family moved to London. De Marsillac Plunkett opened an office and became a founding member of the London chapter of the American Institute of Architects, and, in 1993, a member of the Royal Institute of British Architects.

After some years, the family moved in stages to Dunsany Castle in County Meath, being fully settled in Ireland by 1997. De Marsillac Plunkett qualified as an architect in Ireland.

During her career, De Marsillac Plunkett held architectural licences in Brazil, Ireland, UK and several US states, including New York; she conducted projects in those countries and in Portugal, Ghana and Russia. She also patented an invention.

=== Châtelaine ===
In 1999, Edward Plunkett inherited both the Barony of Dunsany and Dunsany Castle and its estate. Upon becoming Lady Dunsany and the châtelaine of Dunsany Castle, De Marsillac Plunkett worked to renovate the castle's interior, and launched a programme of renovation of houses on the estate, as well as planning to convert the former gardener's cottage for museum and cafe purposes. She also launched the Dunsany Home Collection, a housewares boutique in the castle.

As Lady Dunsany she hosted extensively, with her table-settings being complimented by former Taoiseach Charles Haughey. De Marsillac Plunkett also supported the curation, scholarship and publication of the works of Lord Dunsany, 18th Baron of Dunsany. She very publicly opposed hunting passing through Dunsany lands, at least once confronting hunt members.

Having cared for her husband at home through a long neurological illness, De Marsillac Plunkett continued at Dunsany after his death in 2011.

== Personal life ==
Soon after her father's death, De Carvalho married Jayme Brandão de Marsillac, a surgical oncologist, with whom she had two children. In 1982, De Marsillac introduced her to his remote cousin, Edward Plunkett, a painter, sculptor and landowner, later also the 20th Lord Dunsany, suggesting she hire Plunkett for her New York business. Some time after, the De Marsillacs divorced and Maria Alice married Plunkett, with whom she had two children, including the filmmaker and environmentalist Randal Plunkett, 21st Baron of Dunsany. The families remained close, the four children brought up together.

On 9 April 2020, de Marsillac Plunkett died in Our Lady's Hospital in Navan from COVID-19, aged 78. Due to COVID-related restrictions, the funeral was attended only by her son Randal and the officiating Catholic priest. She is buried by the Church of St. Nicholas, on the grounds of Dunsany Castle, beside her husband.
