= Aimée de Heeren =

Brazilian socialite and espionage agent (1903–2006)

Aimee de Sá Sottomaior Heeren
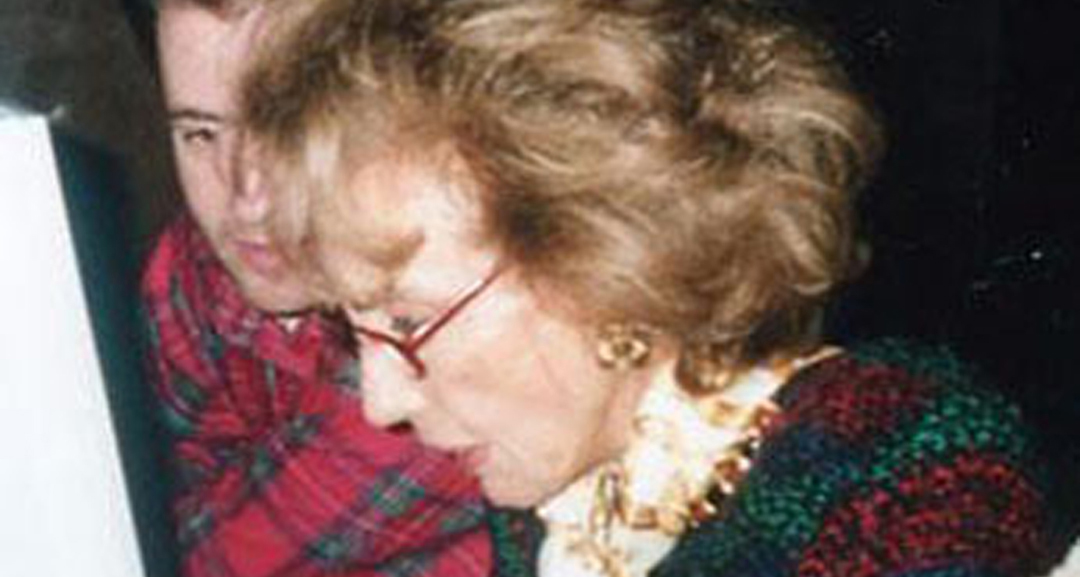
- de Heeren in 2003
- Born: Aimee de Sá Sottomaior; 3 August 1903; Castro, Paraná, Brazil
- Died: 13 September 2006 (aged 103); New York City, U.S.
- Resting place: Palm Beach, Florida, U.S.
- Known for: socialite, espionage
- Spouses: Luís Simões Lopes; Rodman Heeren
- Children: 1

Aimée de Heeren, born Aimée Soto-Maior de Sá or Aimée de Sotomayor (3 August 1903 – 13 September 2006), was a Brazilian socialite.

She was the sister of Vera de Sá Sottomaior, who was married to John Felix Charles "Ivor" Bryce, Randal Plunkett, 19th Baron of Dunsany, and Sir Walter Frederic Pretyman. Through her sister, she was the aunt of the 20th Baron of Dunsany. She was born in Castro, Paraná, as the daughter of school teachers Genésio de Sá Sotomayor and Julieta Sampaio Quentel.

== Rio de Janeiro ==
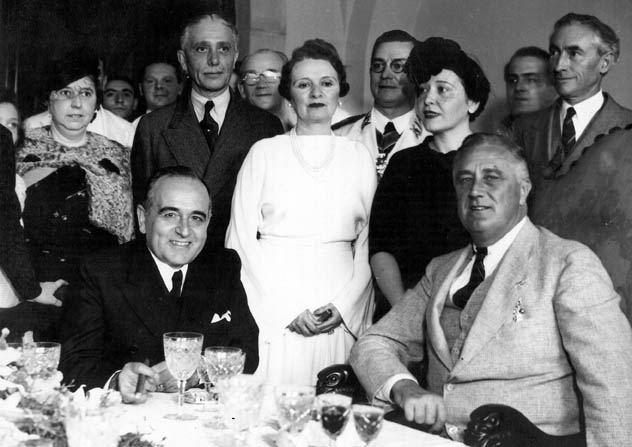
Vargas (left) with U.S. President Franklin D. Roosevelt (right), in Rio de Janeiro, 1936.

In the 1930s, she moved to Rio de Janeiro, where she married Luís Simões Lopes, chief of staff of President Getúlio Vargas. De Heeren lived at the Catete Palace, the seat of the president of Brazil, sparking controversy over her relationship with the president. De Heeren never confirmed nor denied the allegation.

Decades after Vargas's death in 1954, his secret diary was published with multiple references to his "bem-amada" (English: "beloved"). Some historians believe that the "bem-amada" was Aimée de Heeren.

== Secret Service agent in Paris ==
In 1938, de Heeren was sent to France to find information for President Vargas. Vargas was invited to join the Axis powers. As a fashionista Aimée met people from European society including Victor Sassoon and Hugh Grosvenor, 2nd Duke of Westminster. The Duke of Westminster was said to be besotted by her.

De Heeren was also seen with Coco Chanel (now known to be a Nazi agent) at many receptions, including the two Circus Bal events given by Elsie de Wolfe. Chanel and de Heeren remained close friends, particularly towards the end of Chanel's life.

According to Bettina Ballard, the influential editor of American Vogue, de Heeren, at the time called Aimée Lopez or Aimée Lopez de Sotto Major, made a huge impression on French society:

I particularly remember the season when Aimée was lionized in Paris. She was so pretty, so genuinely nice, carried gaiety with her like a fan, and she was almost eaten alive. Hung with diamonds, she was pushed from fittings to balls, never allowed a moment for private conquest because every hostess needed her for her party to prove that she could draw the lioness of the season. Aimee just wanted to dance and flirt and have fun. That wasn't what Paris expected of her.

— Bettina Ballard

Aimee de Heeren's secret service activities in Paris are documented by Showroom Paris and in the inscriptions on the facade of a building, 11 rue des Halles, in the center of the French capital.

== New York and the jet set ==
Due to the Nazi occupation of France, she was forced to emigrate to the USA, where she reunited with Joseph P. Kennedy Jr., and the other Kennedy brothers. Her friendship with the Kennedy family lasted until her death.

She later married the Spanish American Rodman Arturo Heeren, grandson of Antonio Heeren, 1st Count of Heeren, and great-grandson of John Wanamaker, the founder of the Wanamaker Department Stores. The couple had homes in Paris, New York City, Palm Beach, Florida, and Biarritz, as members of the jet set never stayed in one location for very long. The couple had one daughter: Cristina Heeren y Sá de Sotomayor, 3rd Countess of Heeren.

De Heeren was listed as one of the best dressed women in the world several times, and a 1941 edition of Time magazine included her as number three in a list of "Ten Best Dressed Women in the World". She was mentioned in magazines such as Vogue. She was included in the International Best Dressed Hall of Fame List in 1996.

== Later years ==
She took online courses at the Crèmerie de Paris. This resulted in the creation of the Brazilian White Pages. In 2005, at the age of 102, she travelled to Belgrade to attend the 60th birthday of Crown Prince Alexander of Yugoslavia, at the White Palace.

She died in 2006, in New York City, at the age of 103.
