= Christopher Plunkett =

Christopher Plunkett may refer to:

- Christopher Plunkett, 1st Baron of Dunsany (c. 1410–c. 1463), Irish peer
- Christopher Plunkett, 6th Baron of Dunsany (died 1564 or 1565), Irish nobleman
- Christopher Plunkett, 8th Baron of Dunsany (died 1603), Irish nobleman
- Christopher Plunket, 2nd Earl of Fingall (died 1649), Irish peer
