= Randal Plunkett =

Randal Plunkett may refer to:

- Randal Edward Sherborne Plunkett (1848–1883), British Conservative politician
- Randal Plunkett, 19th Baron of Dunsany (1906–1999), Irish peer and soldier
- Randal Plunkett, 21st Baron of Dunsany (born 1983), Irish film director and rewilding advocate
