= Patrick Plunkett, 7th Baron of Dunsany =

Irish noble

Patrick Plunkett, 7th Baron of Dunsany (died 1601 or 1602) was an Irish nobleman.

== Family ==
Patrick was the son of Christopher Plunkett, 6th Baron of Dunsany, and his wife Elizabeth (née Barnewall), daughter of Sir Christopher Barnewall of Crickstown. He succeeded his father in the title in 1564 or 1565, but was a minor, and was placed in the wardship of a relative of his mother, Christopher Barnewall, a politician and landowning knight, of Turvey House, County Dublin. Plunkett married the 11th youngest daughter (one of nineteen children) of his guardian (and his wife Marion (née Sherle)), Mary Barnewall. The couple received in 1572 a substantial gift of money and farm animals, partly as the advance dowry for the future marriage of their son Christopher Plunkett to another of Sir Christopher Barnewall's daughters.

== Education and politics ==
The 7th baron attended a grammar school at Ratoath, and was reputed for his learning; a book by Richard Stanihurst about Ireland, published in 1584, was dedicated to him. The 7th baron attended at least the 1585 Irish Parliament and held a local appointment in 1599. He assisted the government in dealing with a rebellion in 1600, alongside Henry Óg O'Neill and Sir Geoffrey Fenton. He was acquainted with Queen Elizabeth I, who granted him 20 horsemen and funding to support them, and a mug reputedly from whom has been held at Dunsany Castle since the 16th century.

== Death and succession ==
Patrick Plunkett died in 1601 or 1602, and was succeeded briefly by his son Christopher, who in turn died in 1603, not having fulfilled the marriage pledge with the Barnewalls, and was succeeded by his son Patrick.

Peerage of Ireland
Preceded by Christopher Plunkett	Baron Dunsany; 1564 or 65 - 1601 or 1602	Succeeded by Christopher Plunkett
