= Wexford Martyrs =

Irish Roman Catholic martyrs, executed in 1581

The 4 Blessed Wexford Martyrs
- Born: unknown
- Died: 5 July 1581 AD; Wexford town
- Cause of death: martyrdom (hanged, drawn and quartered)
- Beatified: 1992 by Saint Pope John Paul II
- Feast: 20 June
- Patronage: Wexford town, sailors

The Wexford Martyrs were Matthew Lambert, Robert Meyler, Edward Cheevers and Patrick Cavanagh. In 1581, they were convicted of high treason for aiding in the escape of James Eustace, 3rd Viscount Baltinglass; for similarly conveying a Jesuit and other Catholic priests and laymen out of Ireland; and for refusing to take the Oath of Supremacy which declared Elizabeth I of England to be the Supreme Governor of the Church within her dominions. On 5 July 1581, they were hanged, drawn and quartered in Wexford, Ireland. They were beatified in 1992 by Pope John Paul II.

== Background ==
In the Pale the predominant religion was Catholic, and the Catholics saw a growing threat from the Protestant-dominated government, a perception supported by their marked decline in participation within the kingdom's government. English-born Protestants increasingly occupied positions of authority. The people of the Pale resented taxes on their property for the government's military policy against the Gaelic nobility of Ireland and rebellious Hiberno-Normans. Troops were also billeted upon their lands. James Eustace's father, Rowland Eustace, 2nd Viscount Baltinglass, had been imprisoned in Dublin Castle by the Elizabethan administration for his opposition.

During the summer of 1580, James Eustace, 3rd Viscount Baltinglass, apparently prompted almost entirely by religious motives, raised an army in County Wicklow, in support of Second Desmond Rebellion in Munster. The Viscount's allies included the coalition of Irish clans led by Fiach McHugh O'Byrne, Chief of the Name of Clann Uí Bhroin (Clan O'Byrne) and Lord of Ranelagh. At first the uprising was successful, but Baltinglass did not coordinate his efforts with those of Desmond and could not sustain the conflict. He and his followers were outlawed. Forty-five were hanged in Dublin. James Eustace escaped to Munster, where Desmond was still in revolt. After the Rebel Earl of Desmond was killed, Baltinglass sought to flee for Spain.

== Escape of Viscount Baltinglass ==
Pursued by Crown forces after the defeat of the Second Desmond Rebellion, James Eustace and his Jesuit military chaplain, Father Robert Rochford, eventually found refuge with Matthew Lambert, a Wexford baker.

Lambert fed them and arranged with five sailor acquaintances for safe passage by ship for them to Catholic Europe. Lambert was betrayed, along with sailors Patrick Cavanagh, Edward Cheevers, Robert Myler, John O'Lahy, and one other. They were arrested, imprisoned, and tortured, before being executed in Wexford on 5 July 1581.

The authorities heard of the plan beforehand and Matthew was arrested together with his five sailor friends. Thrown into prison, they were questioned about politics and religion. Lambert's reply was: "I am not a learned man. I am unable to debate with you, but I can tell you this, I am a Catholic and I believe whatever our Holy Mother the Catholic Church believes." They were found guilty of treason and hanged, drawn, and quartered in Wexford on 5 July 1581. Lambert was bound to a horse's tail and dragged through the streets of Wexford to the gallows where he and the five sailors were executed.

== Other two martyrs ==
There were apparently six martyrs but only four of them were beatified in 1992, perhaps due to a lack of sufficient evidence for the existence of the other two martyrs. One of them was believed to have been called John O' Lahy and the other was an anonymous individual. Nothing is known about these two men. Their names are usually excluded from the group of 17 Irish martyrs whom John Paul II named among the blessed.

== See also ==
- Irish Catholic Martyrs
