= James Eustace, 3rd Viscount Baltinglass =

James FitzEustace of Harristown, 3rd Viscount Baltinglass (1530–1585) James FitzEustace, the eldest son of Rowland Eustace, 2nd Viscount Baltinglass and Joan, daughter of James Butler, 8th Baron Dunboyne.

== Early life ==
He was born in 1530. Baltinglass's family was traditionally associated with the FitzGerald family, the earls of Kildare, but prudently remained loyal to Henry VIII during the "Silken Thomas" Rebellion of 1534–35. For their loyalty, they were granted additional lands. Later in the 1540s Thomas FitzEustace, James's grandfather, was created first Viscount Baltinglass by a grateful king. But like many other old English Pale families, the FitzEustaces later became disillusioned.

Baltinglass's circle included the Pale families of Plunkett, Dillon, Aylmer, Fitzsimon, Sedgrave and Nugent. Within this circle, discontent increased and the Baltinglass revolt was first conceived. Previously for airing his views James had earned a night in jail, a sermon, a fine and the lasting enmity of Adam Loftus, the Protestant Archbishop of Dublin. James Eustace was educated at Gray's Inn, the most prestigious of the Inns of Court in London, and lived in Rome during the 1570s. James had as his tutor an influential priest, Sir Norman Eustace and became a fervent Catholic who regarded Queen Elizabeth I as illegitimate, a usurper, a tyrant, and a heretic. Generally, the government viewed James as misguided, but not a threat. They were even dismissive of him, which echoed ironically after his revolt broke.

== Marriage ==
He married Mary Travers, daughter and co-heiress of Sir Henry Travers of Monkstown Castle, only child of Sir John Travers, by Genet Preston, but they had no children. Henry predeceased his father. Mary died in 1610, having married secondly, in 1587, Sir Gerald Aylmer, Bart., of Donadea, a Catholic loyalist, repeatedly imprisoned, but finally released and knighted, by Queen Elizabeth, and created baronet by King James. Sir John Travers of Monkstown (Carrickbrennan), County Dublin, was a connection of the Earl of Kildare. He was Master of the Ordnance and a Groom of the Chambers. He married Genet Preston, and during the period 1545 to 1551 received many grants of land, including Rathmore and part of Haynestown (east of Naas), Tomogue, and estates in County Carlow. In 1589 Mary petitioned for the return of part of her lands, which must have been extensive. With the assistance of Sir Gerald Aylmer, whom she later married, she obtained the re-possession of the Preceptory of Killerig, County Carlow. Soon after her death in 1610 this estate was shared between several grantees, but mainly Monkstown and its estates in seven counties were left to Henry Cheevers, her sister Katherine's second son.

== Rebellion ==
In 1576, before the death of his father, James Eustace lodged complaints against the religious persecution of the Catholic Church in Ireland and the illegal taxation ordered by the Lord Deputy, Sir Henry Sidney. He and other leading Catholics were imprisoned in 1577, and he was released only just in time to assume his title the next year. Much of their resentment was directed against policies pursued by Queen's officials. To finance military campaigns against the Gaelic nobility of Ireland and rebellious Anglo-Irish magnates, the government levied a military tax, known as the cess, upon the Pale. Troops were also billeted upon the Palesmen. This drew increasingly vociferous complaints from both the Pale's gentry, merchants, and commons. Before Baltinglass's rebellion, their discontent was rife. This Pale community opposed government demands on their assets to maintain its military policy. Viscount Roland, James's father, was a prominent leader. With other leaders, he was imprisoned in the closing years of the 1570s by the Elizabethan administration who viewed their opposition as little short of treason. Such action on the government's part only increased its unpopularity. The predominant Pale faith was Catholic.

In Catholic eyes there was a growing threat from the Protestant-dominated government, a perception supported by their marked decline in participation within the kingdom's government. English-born Protestants increasingly occupied positions of authority. These government officers found the concept of being both Catholic and a loyal subject to be inconceivable. The persecution was further escalated in retaliation for Pope Pius V's excommunication of Queen Elizabeth in the 1570 Papal bull Regnans in Excelsis. With growing regularity, the sons of Catholic families from the Pale withdrew from English universities and pursued their education in Catholic Europe. Within the walls of these continental colleges the Classics, Medieval Scholasticism, Renaissance humanism, Counter-Reformation theology, Baroque art, and Baroque literature dominated. Catholic Palesmen were profoundly affected by their exposure to the intellectual and cultural flowering. Their education made them more determined to both defy and to resist the religious persecution of the Catholic Church in Ireland upon their return.

In 1579, Gerald FitzGerald, 15th Earl of Desmond, took up arms in Munster for a second time against the Queen, in the so-called Second Desmond Rebellion. Elizabeth I appointed Thomas Butler, 10th Earl of Ormond to deal with the rebellion. This he eventually did, but with ruthless and terrible severity. During the summer of 1580, James Eustace, Viscount Baltinglass, apparently prompted almost entirely by religious motives, recruited a Catholic army in County Wicklow, with the goal to assist Desmond. His allies included many influential Catholics, some of them his own relatives.

James Eustace knew that he lacked the necessary military muscle, a suitable operational base and martial experience to be successful. He knew that if he acted independently, his revolt would be crushed easily. Baltinglass's partner in rebellion was Fiach MacHugh O'Byrne, the Chief of the Name of Clan O'Byrne, whose father had defeated Baltinglass's father in a battle that is celebrated in Irish bardic poetry. This did not, however, prevent an alliance between their sons against a common enemy.

Fiach MacHugh O'Byrne and Lord Baltinglass proved useful partners in rebellion, each bringing different qualities and assets beneficial to the rebellion's initial success. Fiach provided the military leadership and raised the Irish clans of Leinster, who viewed him as their Chief and their protector.

Baltinglass's championing of the Catholic cause gave the revolt the extra dimension which the government so feared. Without Baltinglass's involvement, the uprising would have been looked upon merely as yet another rising of the Irish clans. It would not have received any significant aid from Catholic Palesmen. An alliance between the Irish-speaking Clans of the Wicklow Mountains and an English-speaking army from the Pale was a new development in the long history of uprisings against both the House of Plantagenet and the House of Tudor in Ireland. What this alliance symbolized terrified the government and was to be repeated many times in uprisings to come.

News of this soon reached the ears of Ormonde, James Eustace's brother-in-law, (Edmund Butler, brother of the Earl of Ormonde, had married Eleanor Eustace, Baltinglass's sister) who sent him a severe warning, for which we have Baltinglass's defiant reply, later produced in evidence against him.

At first, the revolt was successful, and on 25 August 1580, a severe defeat was inflicted upon the troops of the Lord Deputy in the Wicklow Mountains at the Battle of Glenmalure. The Annals of the Four Masters states that "the entire extent of country from the Slaney to the Shannon and from the Boyne to the meeting of the Three Waters became one scene of strife and dissension".

But Baltinglass and O'Byrne never coordinated their efforts with those of Earl Desmond, and in any case, had started too late. There was desultory fighting for nearly a year, but with no large engagement, and the Baltinglass troops overran a large area doing great damage, but were then hopelessly overpowered. A force of Spaniards and Italians had landed at Smerwick, County Kerry, in order to assist the Catholic cause, but when they had completed the long march of 150 miles to Naas were taken prisoner and massacred. The scene of this massacre, on the southern edge of the town, is still called Spaniards Cross or Foad Spaniagh.

== Defeat & Exile ==
Baltinglass and his followers were outlawed and forty-five of them were hanged in Dublin. James Eustace escaped to Munster, where Desmond was still in revolt, and thence, with the aid of the Wexford Martyrs, to Spain. He was well received, and only just failed to persuade King Philip II of Spain to provide sufficient troops and ships to invade Ireland. He died there childless in 1585. The fates of his five brothers were as follows:

1. Edmund Eustace had married Frances, daughter of Robert Pipho, and secondly Joan, daughter of Richard Walsh of Carrickmines, who afterwards married Dermot Kavanagh of Knockangary. In 1583 he escaped to Scotland and thence to Spain, where he was created "4th Viscount" by the Pope. He served against England in the Armada in 1588, and died in Portugal in 1594.
2. Thomas Eustace was executed in 1582.
3. William Eustace was certainly believed to have been slain in battle in 1581, for it was officially reported to Sir Francis Walsingham, Secretary of State in London, "Head of William Eustace, another of the Baltinglass brethren, taken this morning." It is, possible however that this report was untrue and that he was the ancestor of the Eustaces of Robertstown whose distinguished line will be dealt with later. The Complete Peerage reports that William (4th son) was "slain in rebellion, 21 Apr. 1581." Burke's Extinct Peerage1883 reports that William (3rd son) "had not been engaged in rebellion ... (and was) ... living as Viscount Baltinglass, in 1610".
4. Walter Eustace was captured in 1583 and executed.
5. Richard Eustace was in Paris at the time of the Second Desmond Rebellion. With future Irish Catholic Martyr Dermot O'Hurley acting as his interpreter, Richard Eustace engaged in arranging for the dispatch of ammunition and supplies to aid his brothers. He was later ordained as a Roman Catholic priest in Rome.

Among the other Eustaces from County Kildare who took part were Maurice of Castlemartin and Thomas of Kerdiffstown (near Sallins), who were both executed, and John of Newland and Oliver of Blackhall, Clane, who were eventually pardoned, as was Maurice FitzGerald of Osberstown, Naas, who was the husband of Baltinglass's aunt Janet.

In 1585, the Statute of Baltinglass was ultimately passed by the Parliament of Ireland despite considerable opposition. Under this Act, the Eustace family, its titles and arms were attainted, and all the vast Baltinglass possessions were forfeited, with retrospective clauses voiding all transfers of property that had taken place during the previous twelve years. The Eustace family of Harristown, Lords of Portlester, Kilcullen and Baltinglass, were virtually obliterated. Lord James and his brothers had fought what they considered a just war, but they had been defeated and, for their failure, both their family and the Catholic Church in Ireland paid dearly. Whether James Eustace and his followers were traitors or national heroes who died fighting to save their country from what would become centuries of religious persecution, they were certainly brave men.

At the time of the attainder, the Dowager Viscountess petitioned to retain her jointure or to be granted an alternative residence.

Almost all the forfeited estates were granted to Sir Henry Harrington who had been active in quelling the rebellion. He sold them in 1617 to Sir Charles Wilmot, from whom they passed, via Sir James Carroll and Sir Thomas Roper, to the Viscounts (later Earls) of Aldborough. Harristown, Rochestown and Calverstown were granted in about 1590 to John Eustace of Castlemartin. The Baltinglass, house in Dublin and a lease of New Abbey, Kilcullen, were granted to Edmund Spenser, the poet, who was Secretary to the Lord Deputy, Arthur Grey, 14th Baron Grey de Wilton. Rathfarnham Castle and much of the land around Rathfarnham also belonged to the Eustace family of Baltinglass. However, this estate was also confiscated for their part in the Second Desmond Rebellion of 1579–83. Rathfarnham castle and its lands were instead granted to the Viscount 's mortal enemy, Archbishop Adam Loftus.

The title was revived in 1685, when Colonel Richard Talbot, of Carton, was created Viscount Baltinglass, but he died without an heir six years later. It was again revived in 1763, when John Stratford was created Baron of Baltinglass, but he was advanced in 1776 to Viscount Aldborough and this title became extinct in 1875. The Eustaces of Castlemartin and Harristown were connected with his family twice. His father had married (as his second wife) Penelope née Eustace, one of the three co-heiresses of Sir Maurice Eustace, the Lord Chancellor of Ireland. His great-great-granddaughter, Louisa Saunders of Saunders Grove, married in 1860 Thomas Tickell, descendant and heir of Clotilda, Penelope's sister and another of the co-heiresses.

Peerage of Ireland
Preceded by Rowland Eustace	Viscount Baltinglass; 1578–1585	Extinct
