= John Plunkett, 3rd Baron of Dunsany =

15th-century Irish noble

Baron of Dunsany
- Predecessor: Richard Plunkett
- Successor: Edward Plunkett
- Full name: John Plunkett
- Died: 1500
- Spouse: Catherine Hussey

John Plunkett, 3rd Baron of Dunsany (died 1500) was an Irish nobleman.

He was the only son of Richard Plunkett, 2nd Baron of Dunsany, and his wife Joan FitzEustace, daughter of the wealthy and powerful statesman Rowland FitzEustace, 1st Baron Portlester, and his first wife Elizabeth Brune. He succeeded to the title around 1482. His widowed mother remarried her cousin Sir Maurice FitzEustace of Coghlanstown, eldest son and heir of Sir Robert FitzEustace, by whom she had at least one son, Christopher.

In 1472 or 1474 he was a founder member of the Brotherhood of Saint George, a short-lived military guild which was charged with the defence of the Pale (the only part of Ireland under secure English control), and which was for some years the only English standing army in Ireland. At one point it had 13 knights.

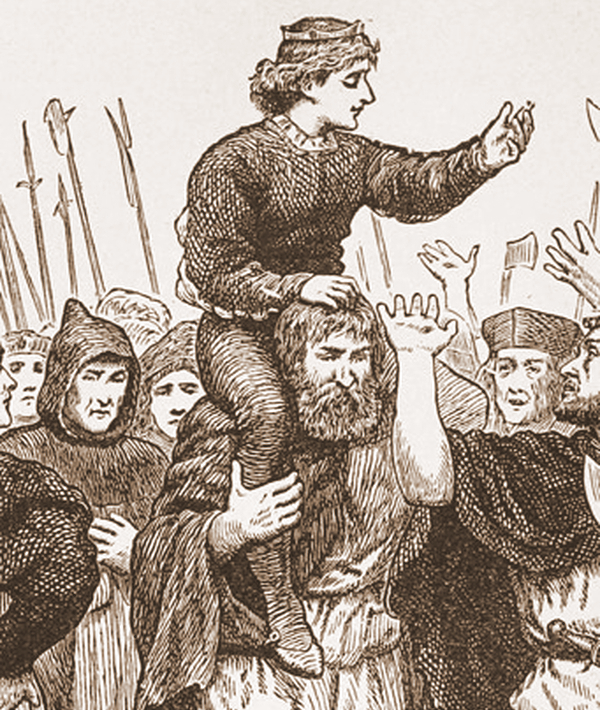
Lambert Simnel in Ireland

In 1487, like the great majority of the Anglo-Irish nobility, he made the mistake of supporting the claims of the pretender Lambert Simnel to the English throne. Simnel was crowned in Dublin, and invaded England with a largely Irish army, but his cause was crushed at the Battle of Stoke. The victorious King Henry VII, the founder of the Tudor dynasty, was magnanimous in victory - Simnel was pardoned, and Dunsany and his fellow peers in 1488 performed an act of public penance for their rebellion and in their turn also received a royal pardon. The King however could not resist playing a joke by inviting all of the Lords Temporal of Ireland, then 15 in number including Dunsany, to a banquet at Greenwich in 1489, where to their embarrassment Simnel, now a servant in the royal kitchen, waited on them at table.

Dunsany attended the Parliament of Ireland in 1490 and 1493. He was fined forty shillings for his non-attendance at the Parliamentary session of 1498 in Castledermot.

Dunsany married Catherine Hussey, daughter of John Hussey, 7th Baron Galtrim, with whom he had three children, Edward, Nicholas and Margaret. He died in 1500 and was succeeded by his eldest son Edward Plunkett, 4th Baron of Dunsany.

Peerage of Ireland
Preceded by Richard Plunkett	Baron Dunsany; 1480–1500	Succeeded by Edward Plunkett
