= Patrick Plunkett, 9th Baron of Dunsany =

Irish noble and politician

Patrick Plunkett, 9th Baron of Dunsany (1595–1668) was an Irish nobleman and politician, prominent in Irish affairs in a turbulent period.

== Family ==
Patrick was the only son of Christopher Plunkett, 8th Baron of Dunsany, and his Derbyshire-born wife Mary (née Babington). He succeeded his father in the title in 1603, as a minor under the guardianship of Sir Patrick Barnewall. He had his principal residence at Castlecorr, on the border with County Cavan in northwestern County Meath, rather than at Dunsany, though he did also live at Dunsany, notably in the late 1640s and after the restoration.

== Politics ==
The 9th baron took an active part in talks between leading Catholic peers and the King's representatives in the 1620s. He was given new lands in several counties, even as some in government were concerned about the number of Catholic clergy within his extended family. When a rebellion began in Ulster in 1641, Dunsany attended a session of the Irish Parliament to address the matter, and offered to intercede; he later became further entangled in the debates among leading Irish families. While eventually agreeing to support the rebellion, he also sheltered Protestant families, helping some reach Dublin. He was confined in Dublin Castle from March 1642 to September 1643.

In 1648, Dunsany took the Catholic Confederation oath of loyalty. His lands were seized by Oliver Cromwell's forces in the 1650s, and he lived in deprived circumstances for many years thereafter. After the Restoration in 1660, it was indicated in the King's name that he should receive his lands back, but a later court ruling went against him, albeit he eventually secured a provision for a son to inherit all rights back. In 1665 he was restored to the title of Dunsany Castle and one-third of his former lands, with the rest to be restored later - this did not fully happen.

== Death and succession ==
Patrick Plunkett died in 1668, and both sons - Christopher and Edward - having died by then, was succeeded by a grandson, also Christopher.

Peerage of Ireland
Preceded by Christopher Plunkett	Baron Dunsany; 1603–1668	Succeeded by Christopher Plunkett
