= Thomas Roper, 1st Viscount Baltinglass =

Anglo-Irish soldier and peer

Thomas Roper, 1st Viscount Baltinglass (c.1587 – 18 February 1638) was an Anglo-Irish soldier and peer.

== Biography ==
Roper served as a distinguished military commander of the English royal army in Ireland during the reign of James I, having fought at a young age in the Tudor conquest of Ireland. He was knighted at Christ Church Cathedral, Dublin on 16 September 1603 and was invested as member of the Privy Council of Ireland. Between 1608 and his death he was Constable of Castle Maine. On 10 November 1626, he obtained a grant of the monastery and Lordship of Baltinglass from The Crown. On 27 June 1627 he was created Viscount Baltinglass and Baron of Bantry in the Peerage of Ireland.

He married Ann Harington, daughter of Sir Henry Harington and Ruth Pilkington, with whom he had four children, two sons and two daughters. He was buried on 20 February 1638 at Church of St. John the Evangelist, Dublin. He was succeeded by his second son, also called Thomas. This is another occasion where Cokayne’s Peerage is unreliable.

Peerage of Ireland
New creation	Viscount Baltinglass; 2nd creation 1627–1638	Succeeded by Thomas Roper
