= HMS Stromboli (1839) =

Sloop of the Royal Navy

History

United Kingdom
- Name: HMS Stromboli
- Ordered: 12 March 1838
- Builder: Royal Dockyard, Portsmouth
- Cost: £41,240
- Laid down: September 1838
- Launched: 27 August 1839
- Completed: 6 September 1840
- Commissioned: 18 July 1840
- Honours and awards: Acre 1840; Baltic 1854; Crimea/Black Sea 1855; Sea of Azov 1855
- Fate: Sold for breaking August 1866

General characteristics
- Type: Steam Vessels (SV2); First Class Sloop
- Displacement: 1,283 tons
- Tons burthen: 965 79/94 bm
- Length: 180 ft 1.575 in (54.9 m) gundeck; 157 ft 2.75 in (47.9 m) keel for tonnage
- Beam: 34 ft 4 in (10.5 m) maximum; 34 ft 0 in (10.4 m) for tonnage
- Draught: 13 ft 0 in (4.0 m) (forward); 13 ft 5 in (4.1 m) (aft)
- Depth of hold: 21 ft 0 in (6.4 m)
- Installed power: 280 nominal horsepower
- Propulsion: 2-cylinder side lever steam engine; Paddles
- Sail plan: 3-masted barque rigged
- Complement: 149 (later 160)
- Armament: As built: 2 × 10-inch (84 cwt) shell guns; 2 × 68-pdrs (64 cwt) carronades; 2 × 42-pdr (22 cwt) carronades; From 1856: 1 × 68-pdr (84 cwt) MLSB guns; 4 × 32-pdr (42 cwt) MLSB guns; 1860s; 1 × 110-pounder pivot gun; 4 × 32-pdr (42 cwt) MLSB guns

HMS Stromboli was initially a Steam Vessel second class (later reclassed as a First Class Sloop) designed by Sir William Symonds, Surveyor of the Navy, and built at Portsmouth. She was commissioned and participated in the bombardment of Acre in 1840, during the Russian War she was used as a troop transport in the Baltic in 1854, she was in the Black Sea and the Sea of Azov in 1855. Her last overseas posting was on the South East Coast of America. She was sold for breaking in August 1866.

Stromboli was the only vessel of this name in the Royal Navy.

== Construction ==
She was ordered on 12 March 1838 with her laid in September at Portsmouth Dockyard. She was launched on 27 August 1839. She was completed for sea on 6 September 1840 at an initial cost of £41,420, including £19,248 for hull construction, £13,280 for her machinery and £8,712 for her fitting out. (Note: A total cost accounting for inflation of approximately £3,952,900 in today's money.)

== Commissioned service ==
=== First commission ===
She was commissioned on 18 July 1840 under the command of Woodford John Williams, RN for service in the Mediterranean. She was with the British squadron off the coast of Syria in November 1840. She participated in the bombardment of Acre on 3 November. Commander William Louis, RN took command on 11 June 1841. She returned to Home Waters paying off at Woolwich in June 1843.

=== Second commission ===
She commissioned under Commander Edward Plunkett on 13 October 1843 for service on the Irish Station and Particular Service. Commander Thomas Fisher, RN took command on 13 June 1845 followed by Commander Lord Amelius Wentworth Beauclerk, RN on 11 November 1847. She was paid off at Portsmouth into the Steam Reserve, on 17 September 1850.

=== Third commission ===
She was commissioned on 18 August 1853 under commander Robert Hall, RN for service in the Mediterranean. As tensions increased with Russia her sailing for the Mediterranean was delayed. She joined Sir Robert Napier's Fleet for service in the Baltic after war with Russia was declared. During the Baltic campaign she was used as a troop Transport. She returned to Home Waters when the Fleet left the Baltic in September prior to the Winter freeze up. By December she was in the Mediterranean, joining the British Fleet in the Black Sea. Between 9 April and 7 September she participated in bombarding Sevastopol. After the occupation of Kertch, she participated in the naval excursion led by HMS Miranda into the Sea of Azov. In August 1855 Commander Cowper Phipps Coles, RN took command. Commander George Foster Burgess, RN took command on 27 February 1856. By March 1857, she is in a paid off state at Portsmouth.

=== Fourth commission ===
She was commissioned on 9 December 1861 under Commander William Buller Fullerton Elphinstone, RN for service in Home Waters at Portsmouth. On 21 December (12 days later) she came under the command of Commander Aurthur Robert Henry, RN for service on the east coast of South America. When Commander Henry became invalided on 4 June 1863, Commander Alexander Philips, RN took command. She returned to Home Waters paying off on 8 June 1866.

== Disposition ==
She was sold in August 1866 to White of East Cowes, Isle of Wight. She was towed to Cowes on 24 August 1866 for breaking.
