= Andrew O'Dwyer =

Irish politician (1800–1877)

Andrew Carew O'Dwyer (1800 – 15 November 1877) was an Irish politician.

Born in Cork, O'Dwyer trained as a barrister, while writing articles for periodicals. After qualifying, he lived on Upper Mount Street in Dublin. He stood in Drogheda at the 1832 UK general election. He made great efforts before the election to register voters newly eligible under the Reform Act 1832, and just before the election was endorsed by Daniel O'Connell as a Repeal Association candidate. He won the seat, and was re-elected at the 1835 UK general election, but was then unseated on petition. He stood in the resulting 1835 Drogheda by-election and was re-elected, but as he had already been deemed ineligible, his opponent, Randall Edward Plunkett, was instead awarded the seat.

In 1837, O'Dwyer was appointed as the filacer of the exchequer, serving until the office was abolished in 1845, and then received a substantial pension. At the 1857 UK general election, he stood in Waterford City as a Radical, but took last place.

Parliament of the United Kingdom
Preceded by Thomas Wallace	Member of Parliament for Drogheda; 1832 – 1835	Succeeded by Randall Edward Plunkett
