= Viscount Baltinglass =

Viscount Baltinglass, in the County of Wicklow, was a title created three times in the Peerage of Ireland.

The first came on 29 June 1541 in favour of Thomas Eustace, 1st Baron Kilcullen. He had already been created Baron Kilcullen, in the County of Kildare, in September 1535, also in the Peerage of Ireland.

Lord Baltinglass was the nephew and heir of Rowland FitzEustace, 1st Baron Portlester, who died without legitimate male issue. His grandson, the third Viscount, took part in the Desmond Rebellion of 1581 and was attainted in 1585 with his titles forfeited. He died the same year. His younger brothers both Edmund and William both subsequently styled themselves Viscount Baltinglass although the titles were never restored.

The second creation came on 27 June 1627 in favour of Sir Thomas Roper. He was made Baron of Bantry, in the County of Cork, at the same time, also in the Peerage of Ireland. Two of his sons, Thomas, the second Viscount, and Cary, the third Viscount, both succeeded in the titles. The titles became extinct on the latter's death in 1672.

== Viscount Baltinglass, first creation ==
=== Baron Kilcullen (1535) ===
- Thomas Eustace, 1st Baron Kilcullen (c. 1480–1549) (created Viscount Baltinglass in 1541)

=== Viscount Baltinglass (1541) ===
- Thomas Eustace, 1st Viscount Baltinglass (c. 1480–1549)
- Rowland Eustace, 2nd Viscount Baltinglass (1505–1578)
- James Eustace, 3rd Viscount Baltinglass (died 1585)

== Viscount Baltinglass, second creation (1627) ==
- Thomas Roper, 1st Viscount Baltinglass (died 1637)
- Thomas Roper, 2nd Viscount Baltinglass (died c. 1670)
- Cary Roper, 3rd Viscount Baltinglass (died 1672)
