= Robert Plunkett, 5th Baron of Dunsany =

Irish noble (d.1559)

Robert Plunkett, 5th Baron Dunsany (died 1559) was an Anglo-Irish nobleman of the Tudor period.

== Background ==
He was the only surviving son of Edward Plunkett, 4th Baron of Dunsany and his wife Amy (or Anny) de Bermingham, daughter of Philip de Bermingham and Ellen Strangeways. His mother died in 1500, suggesting a birth date for Robert in the late 1490s. He succeeded to the title of Baron of Dunsany in 1521, when his father was killed while assisting the Earl of Surrey, the Lord Lieutenant of Ireland, in putting down a rebellion by the O'Connor and O'Carroll families.

== Marriages and children ==
Robert married firstly Eleanor Darcy, daughter of Sir William Darcy of Platten and his first wife Margaret St Lawrence. They had at least thirteen children, most of whom survived infancy, including:

- John, who died before his father, leaving an only daughter, Elizabeth;
- Christopher, 6th Baron of Dunsany;
- Gerald, who married Catherine Eustace, daughter of Thomas Eustace, 1st Viscount Baltinglass;
- Richard;
- Ellen, who married Matthew Begg;
- Jenet, who married James FitzGerald;
- Alison, who married Christopher Plunkett;
- Anne, who married Simon Pettit;
- Mary, who married Richard Luttrell;
- Margaret, who married Walter, Baron Skryne;
- Elizabeth, who married Sir Walter FitzGerald, a younger son of Gerald FitzGerald, 8th Earl of Kildare and his second wife Elizabeth St.John.

Dunsany married secondly Jenet Sarsfield, who had already buried two husbands and was to have six in all. They do not seem to have been married for more than two years when Dunsany died in March 1559; their two sons apparently died in infancy. Despite the brevity of the marriage, Jenet took great pride in her rank as a baroness: although she made three further marriages, two of them to knights, she preferred in later life to be called Lady Dunsany, and was buried under that title in a tomb of her own design.

== Career ==
During the rebellion of Silken Thomas, Dunsany, whose daughter Elizabeth was married to Thomas's uncle Walter FitzGerald (who was later executed for his part in the Rebellion), fell under suspicion of treason, and in the autumn of 1535, he was denounced to the Crown as a ringleader of the rebellion. His enemies urged that he should be attainted but in the event Henry VIII, having virtually destroyed the FitzGerald family, including Dunsany's son-in-law Walter, was prepared to be merciful to the other nobles of the Pale, and Dunsany escaped unscathed.

His later career suggests that he had regained the Crown's trust. He took his seat in the Irish House of Lords in the Parliament of 1541; he was one of the nobles who confirmed the election of Sir Francis Bryan as Governor of Ireland in 1549; and in 1557 he accompanied the Lord Deputy, Sussex, on an expedition against the McDonnells of Ulster. He died in 1559 and was succeeded by his second son, Christopher.

Peerage of Ireland
Preceded by Edward Plunkett	Baron Dunsany; 1521–1559	Succeeded by Christopher Plunkett
