= Randall Plunkett, 15th Baron of Dunsany =

Anglo-Irish peer (1804–1852)

Randall Plunkett

Representative peer of Ireland
- In office 1850-1852

Member of Parliament for Drogheda
- In office 1835-1837

Personal details
- Born: 5 September 1804
- Died: 7 April 1852 (aged 47)
- Party: Conservative
- Spouse: Elizabeth Evelyn (m. 1838)
- Parent: Edward Plunkett (father)

Randall Edward Plunkett, 15th Baron Dunsany (5 September 1804 – 7 April 1852) was an Anglo-Irish peer and Conservative politician.

== Biography ==
Plunkett was the son of Edward Plunkett, 14th Baron Dunsany and his first wife, Hon. Charlotte Louisa Lawless.

On 29 June 1835, he was declared elected on petition as the Member of Parliament for Drogheda, after his opponent Andrew O'Dwyer had been deemed ineligible. He represented the seat as a Conservative until 1837. On 11 December 1848, he inherited his father's title, becoming Baron of Dunsany. In 1850 Dunsany was elected as an Irish representative peer and took his seat in the House of Lords.

On 29 December 1838, he married Elizabeth Evelyn. Dunsany was succeeded in his title by his younger brother, Edward.

Parliament of the United Kingdom
Preceded by Andrew O'Dwyer	Member of Parliament for Drogheda; 1835-1837	Succeeded by William Somerville
Political offices
Preceded by The Earl of Dunraven	Representative peer for Ireland; 1850–1852	Succeeded by The Earl of Mayo
Peerage of Ireland
Preceded by Edward Plunkett	Baron of Dunsany; 1848–1852	Succeeded by Edward Plunkett
