= Richard Plunkett, 2nd Baron of Dunsany =

15th century Irish noble

Richard Plunkett, 2nd Baron of Dunsany (died c. 1482) was an Irish nobleman. He was one of at least five surviving sons of Christopher Plunkett, 1st Baron of Dunsany, and his first wife Anne Fitzgerald, daughter of Richard FitzGerald. He succeeded to the title in 1462.

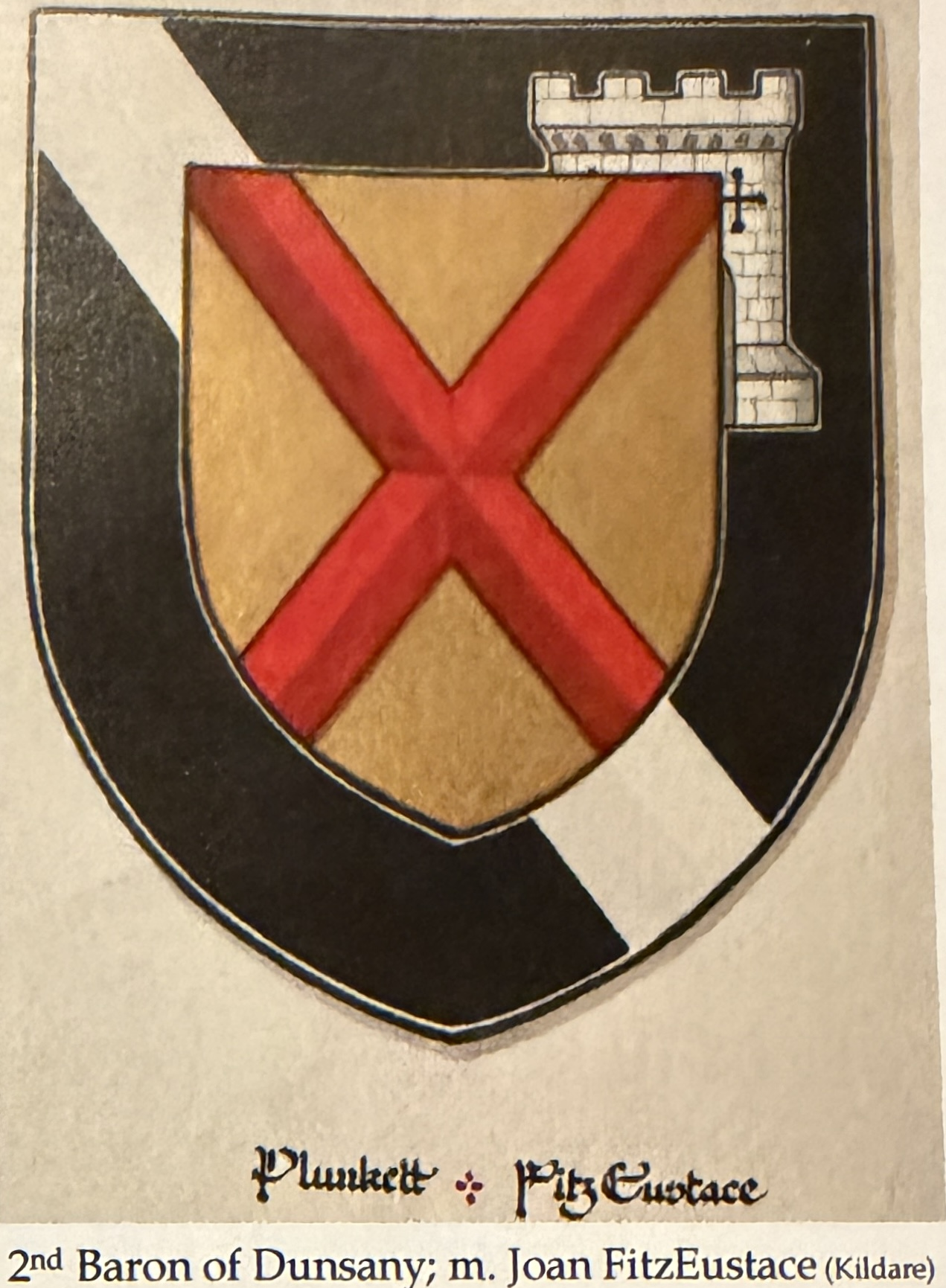
Shield (arms) of Richard, 2nd Baron Dunsany, with wife's escutcheon over

He married Joan FitzEustace, daughter of Rowland FitzEustace, 1st Baron Portlester and his first wife Elizabeth Brune; Portlester was a powerful political figure, at various times both Lord Treasurer of Ireland and Lord High Chancellor of Ireland. Richard Plunkett was alive in 1477 and died around 1482, being succeeded by his son John Plunkett, 3rd Baron of Dunsany. His widow remarried her cousin Sir Maurice FitzEustace.

Peerage of Ireland
Preceded by Christopher Plunkett	Baron Dunsany; 1462–c.1482	Succeeded by John Plunkett
