= Edward Plunkett, 16th Baron of Dunsany =

Anglo-Irish peer and Royal Navy Admiral (1808–1889)

Edward Plunkett, 16th Baron of Dunsany (29 November 1808 – 22 February 1889), was a naval officer and Anglo-Irish peer. He was elected Representative Peer for Ireland in the British House of Lords on 8 March 1864 and served until his death. In addition, he was also deputy lieutenant and justice of the peace in County Meath.

== Birth and family ==
He was the second son of Edward Plunkett, 14th Baron of Dunsany and his first wife, Hon Charlotte Louisa Lawless, the youngest daughter of Nicholas Lawless, 1st Baron Cloncurry and nephew by marriage of Admiral James Ryder Burton, Royal Navy. He was the grandfather of Admiral Sir Reginald Aylmer Ranfurly Plunkett-Ernle-Erle-Drax, KCB, DSO, JP, DL. On 22 September 1846, he married by special license The Hon. Anne Constance Dutton (died 1858), daughter of John Dutton, 2nd Baron Sherborne. The couple had three sons and a daughter. The second eldest son and successor to the title was John Plunkett, 17th Baron of Dunsany.

== Naval service ==
The Hon. Edward Plunkett entered the Royal Navy at the age of 15 on 4 October 1823. He served as a midshipman in the boats of the 48-gun HMS Sybille (1794), commanded by Captain Samuel John Brooke Pechell, in a severe action with the pirates in the Greek archipelago in 1826. He passed his lieutenant's examination in 1830 and was commissioned lieutenant on 24 August 1834. He served in three warships on the coast of Spain from 1835 to 1840 during the First Carlist War. First, in the 36-gun frigate HMS Castor (1832) under Captains Lord John Hay and William Robertson. He then commanded the 10-gun brig HMS Royalist (1823) from 19 January 1837 until taking command of another 10-gun brig, HMS Savage (1830) on 16 July 1838, which he commanded until 1 August 1840. He received the Royal and Military Order of Saint Ferdinand First Class for his service in Spanish waters. Promoted to commander on 1 August 1840, he commanded the paddle-wheel steamer HMS Stromboli (1839) on the Irish Station from 9 October 1843 to June 1845. He was promoted to captain on 9 November 1846.

On 11 December 1848, Captain Edward Plunkett's father, Lord Dunsany, died, and the title passed to Edward's elder brother, Randall Plunkett, who became the 15th Baron of Dunsany. Randall married Elizabeth Evelyn in 1838, but the couple had no children, leaving his brother Edward as the presumptive heir. After leaving active service, he was promoted on the Navy's reserved half-pay list to Rear-Admiral on 12 November 1864 and to Vice-Admiral on 14 July 1871. He was promoted to Admiral on 1 August 1877.

== Post-naval career ==
By 1850, Edward had become chairman of the Caledonian Railway Company.

His elder brother, Randal, died at the age of 47 on 7 April 1852 without heirs, passing the title to his younger brother, Captain Edward Plunkett, who became the 16th Baron of Dunsany.

Remaining active in naval affairs, he was elected vice-president of the Naval Benevolent Society in January 1866. and lectured at the United Services Institution in February 1878 on "The Laws of Warfare as Limiting the use of fireships, explosion-vessels, torpedoes, and mines." In 1882, it was reported that he believed a proposed Channel Tunnel risked invasion.

Admiral Lord Dunsany died at his home in Hastings, Kent, on 22 February 1889 at the age of 80 and was buried at Copthorne, West Sussex.

== Publications ==
As Commander the Hon. E. Plunkett, R.N., he wrote a 216-page book entitled The Past and Future of the British Navy in 1846 in which he discussed both the history of the Navy and its future, commenting on the shifts in naval technology and the impact of steam power as well as providing predictions on the future of the Navy. As the Hon. Captain Plunkett, R.N., he translated from French the two-volume work by Captain Edmond Jurien de La Gravière, French Navy, Guerres Maritimes sous la Républic et L'Empire (Paris, 1847) as Sketches of the Last Naval War (London, 1848). Following the death of his wife, he assuaged his grief by writing Our Naval Position and Policy, by a Naval Peer, which attracted considerable professional attention and was dedicated to "Our Volunteer Riflemen.".

== Portrait ==
- National Portrait Gallery, London.

Edward Plunkett, 16th Baron Dunsany, by Frederick Sargent pencil, 1870s or 1880s?, 8 in. x 5 in. (203 mm x 127 mm), Purchased, 1983. Primary Collection NPG 5606

== Archives ==
- Naval Letterbook, 1842–1845.

Political offices
Preceded by Francis Caulfeild, 2nd Earl of Charlemont	Representative peer for Ireland; 1864–1889	Succeeded by Thomas McClintock-Bunbury, 2nd Baron Rathdonnell
Peerage of Ireland
Preceded by Randall Plunkett	Baron of Dunsany; 1852–1889	Succeeded by John Plunkett
