= Headfort School =

Preparatory school in County Meath, Ireland

Coordinates: 53.73420°N 6.84709°W

Headfort School, first established in 1949 by Lord and Lady Headfort at Headfort House near Kells, County Meath, is Ireland's only remaining preparatory boarding school. It closed in March 2020 but a new operation under the same name opened in September of that year, with a new headmaster.

== Location ==
The school is located at Headfort House, outside the town of Kells, County Meath, some 75 km north west of Dublin. The central part of the house and the western wing was historically rented by the school's operating company from the charitable Headfort Trust; the eastern wing of the house forms a separate residence, Headfort Court. Grounds which once exceeded 1000 acres have been reduced by sale and development, and the school utilises 60 acres, the bulk of the remaining gardens and grounds.

=== Headfort House ===
Headfort House was built in the 1760s for Thomas Taylour, 1st Earl of Bective. It was designed by the Irish architect George Semple, using Ardbraccan limestone for its exterior construction. The interior was designed by Scottish architect Robert Adam and Headfort has the only intact Adam interior in Ireland, with three principal surviving rooms. Much of the original furniture is still in place.

== History ==
=== Early history ===
The school was founded by Lord and Lady Headfort, who planned to launch it in 1948, and did so in 1949, with full operations from 1950. The first headmaster, Romey Coles, served from before opening until 1950, when he was succeeded by David Wild. Other key posts included a senior master, matron, games master, riding master or mistress and heads for classics and music. Swimming was initially in the river on the estate, and until 1969 sports included rifle shooting. Lingard Goulding was principal from 1977 until 2001 and Dermot Dix from 2003 until 2018. The buildings were transferred to the Headfort Trust in 1996, and it made long-term arrangements with the school. In the mid-2000s, work was done to secure the Adams interiors, with the school operations continuing.

=== Closure ===
The school, which had had financial issues for some time, closed in 2020, with the senior master, Neville Wilkinson, commenting that COVID-19 was the "final nail in the coffin" and that "liquidation was the "best of the bad options." The operating company, Headfort School DAC, with about 25 staff, did not receive capitation grant funding, though some State support for the Montessori element existed. It had finished 2019 with a deficit of over 172,000 euro, and, net of a director's loan, had only recovered 44,000 of that during the next operating period. The High Court in May 2020, taking into account monthly salaries and rent of around 100,000 euro, and COVID-19's impact on income, approved winding-up and the appointment of liquidators.

=== Relaunch ===
From May 2020 efforts were made to try to relaunch the school. The original operating company having been wound-up at the High Court, and all staff released, a new corporate structure was proposed, and preparations made to reopen the school from September 2020. The plans envisaged a new operating company, working with the Headfort Trust and a UK trust acting to support fundraising as well meantime. Kevin Allwright, former principal of Aravon School, Bray, was appointed as Head for the proposed relaunch. In August 2020 it was announced that with reasonable subscription for places, the school would reopen in September 2020, and it did so, with, as of 2021, 51 day pupils and 10 boarders.

== Pupils ==
Headfort caters for both day and boarding pupils from the ages of four to thirteen. In 2002 the school started a Montessori school division, which catered to children from the age of three to six. In September 2024 the school extended boarding age to 15 years old with children from the age of 10 being the youngest.

== Curriculum ==
The prep school curriculum includes the core subjects of the Common Entrance Examination, while also meeting the requirements of the Irish national curriculum. English, maths, history, geography, and French or Spanish are timetabled, in addition to religious studies, computer science, and science. Science included practical work in the laboratory as well as theoretical work. Parents are also offered a choice between Latin and Irish. Singing, art, design, and music classes are also regularly timetabled, while afternoons are devoted to games, including hockey, rugby, cricket, horse-riding, squash, tennis and swimming. Pupils can bring and stable their own ponies.

== Ethos ==
Headfort aims to inculcate in its pupils a robust self-confidence, encouraging them to express their own individuality whilst balancing these individual rights with a sense of duty and obligation to the wider community. The school is non-denominational, respecting all religions and the right to have none.

== Popular media ==
A documentary film on Headfort was shown at the Sundance Film Festival in January 2017, and subsequently both in cinemas and on television, and was nominated to the Oscars longlist.

== Notable past pupils ==
Past pupils of the original school operation include:

- Jonah Barrington, squash player
- Robert Bathurst, actor
- Richard Flood, actor
- Jasmine Guinness, designer and model
- Randal Plunkett, film maker, 21st Lord Dunsany
- Clare Shillington, cricketer
- Charlie Swan, National Hunt jockey and trainer
- Ferdinand von Prondzynski, retired professor and university president
- Sam Watson (equestrian), equestrian and data analyst
