= Edward Plunkett, 4th Baron of Dunsany =

Irish noble

Edward Plunkett, 4th Baron of Dunsany (died 1521) was an Irish nobleman; he was killed in battle during the Irish Rebellion of 1520–1.

== Family ==
He was the eldest son of John Plunkett, 3rd Baron of Dunsany, and his wife Catherine Hussey, daughter of John Hussey, 7th Baron Galtrim. He succeeded his father in 1500, becoming the fourth holder of the Dunsany title. His date of birth is uncertain but he was a grown man when he fought at the Battle of Knockdoe in 1504, and had already been a widower for several years. He married Anne (or Anny), daughter and heiress of Philip de Birmingham and Ellen Strangeways, who was, in turn, the daughter of Nicholas Strangeways, Chief Remembrancer of the Exchequer of Ireland and his wife Alice Delahyde; they had one surviving son, Robert Plunkett, 5th Baron of Dunsany.

== Death ==
In 1520 a major rebellion against the English King Henry VIII broke out in Ireland. It was led by the O'Connor and O'Carroll families, although Surrey, the Lord Deputy of Ireland, believed firmly that the moving spirit behind it was Gerald FitzGerald, 9th Earl of Kildare, who saw English rule as a threat to his own family's great power in Ireland (the Fitzgeralds were popularly known as "the uncrowned Kings of Ireland"). Dunsany, who was described as "a valiant man", and who had already seen military action at the Battle of Knockdoe, where he had fought under the command of Kildare's father, raised troops to help crush the rebellion. In pursuit of the O'Connors on 24 January 1521, his horse broke a leg and he was killed on the spot by his enemies.

He was buried at Killeen rather than Dunsany, probably because his wife had predeceased him in 1500 and was buried there. Their tombstone is plain with large Latin lettering, and reads in translation "Here lie the bodies of Sir Edward Plunkett, Knight, Lord of Dunsany, who was slain at Killaderry in Offaly in AD 1521, and of An(n)y Bermingham his wife, AD 1500". He was succeeded by his only surviving son, Robert.

Peerage of Ireland
Preceded by John Plunkett	Baron Dunsany; 1500–1521	Succeeded by Robert Plunkett
