= Bettina Ballard =

American fashion editor and writer

- Born: 1905; Mexico
- Died: March 2, 1961 (aged 55–56); New York City, U.S.
- Other names: Bettina Wilson (early career)
- Occupations: Fashion editor, writer
- Years active: 1934–1960
- Known for: Fashion editor
- Notable work: In My Fashion (1960)
- Spouse(s): Percival Wilson William Fitz Randolph Ballard (m. 1947–1961)

Bettina Ballard (1905 – March 2, 1961) was an American fashion editor and writer who served as the fashion editor for American magazine Vogue from 1946 to 1954. She wrote a memoir entitled In My Fashion, which was published shortly before her death, and chronicles her experiences in the fashion industry from the 1930s to the 1950s.

== Early life ==
Ballard was born in Mexico in 1905 to George Hill, an American businessman, who split his time between Mexico and California. She was raised in California. In the early 1920s, at the age of eighteen, she moved to Paris to study French culture.

== Career ==
=== Early years at Vogue ===
Ballard began her career as a freelance writer in New York under the name Bettina Wilson. In 1934, she wrote a parody of a Vogue article for The New Yorker magazine that caught the attention of Vogue's editor-in-chief, Edna Woolman Chase. Despite initially fearing that her chances with the magazine would be ruined, Ballard was offered a position at Vogue.

Within a year, she was sent to Paris as the American resident editor. Ballard was chosen for this position because she had studied in France and spoke French fluently. During her early years in Paris, she met influential fashion personalities including Cristóbal Balenciaga, Gabrielle "Coco" Chanel, and Christian Dior, developing relationships that would shape her understanding of the Paris couture.

=== Red Cross service ===
When World War II began in 1939, Ballard resigned from Vogue and joined the American Red Cross. She served for three years in Africa, Italy, and France. During her service, she continued to correspond with Edna Woolman Chase, keeping abreast of fashion developments abroad. Some of these correspondences were published in Vogue and are testament to the admiration and tight-knit relationship between the two women.

=== Return to Vogue ===
Upon her return to Vogue in 1945, after divorcing her first husband Percival Wilson, Ballard was offered the position of senior fashion editor in New York. On September 11, 1947, she married William Fitz Randolph Ballard, an architect and chairman of the Citizens Housing and Planning Committee of New York, in Greenwich, Connecticut.

As fashion editor, Ballard covered and reported on American and Paris couture collections. She was responsible for the fashion pages in American Vogue and produced many of the fashion pages for French and English Vogue as well. She was one of the first fashion reporters to cover Italian, Irish, and Spanish fashion showings.

A 1951 Life magazine feature titled "Bettina's Busy Day" followed Ballard through a typical day during Paris fashion week, documenting her hectic schedule visiting different fashion houses, attending shows, participating in photo shoots, and making editorial decisions—often working until 2 A.M.

In 1954, after fifteen years of exile, Chanel staged her comeback collection which initially received a "venomous" reception from the French press. Ballard was one of Chanel's most important supporters during this critical period. Ballard's support was significant as she had developed close relationships with many influential fashion personalities during her early years as the American resident editor in Paris.

=== Photography and editorial approach ===
Ballard's approach to fashion photography emphasized storytelling and an artistic approach. She worked closely with photographers like John Rawlings, Irving Penn, and Cecil Beaton to create innovative fashion imagery. Her experience during the war years gave her a more practical perspective on fashion, which influenced her editorial direction at Vogue.

In the post-war period, Ballard noted significant changes in the fashion landscape. European exclusivity in fashion was waning as American designers gained prominence, and mass production of high-quality copies made haute couture less exclusive. She adapted Vogue's coverage to reflect these changes while maintaining the magazine's sophisticated perspective.

=== Later career ===
Ballard resigned from Vogue in 1954, having served as fashion editor for about eight years. After leaving the magazine, she worked as a fashion consultant and contributed articles to Town & Country magazine. Her work included fashion pieces as well as profiles of emerging artists and designers, and travel essays.

== Writing ==
In 1960, Ballard published her memoir In My Fashion, which chronicled her life in the fashion industry. The book provides an insider's view of the evolution of fashion from the 1930s through the 1950s, including detailed accounts of the European fashion greats—Chanel, Balenciaga, and Schiaparelli—depicting them not as glamorous figures but as diligent professionals in a demanding industry.

The memoir nostalgically recalls pre-war Vogue and traces the significant changes in fashion following World War II, including America's emergence as a fashion center and the rise of ready-to-wear clothing that challenged haute couture's exclusivity. Kirkus Reviews described Ballard's writing as having an "easy pen" but noted that the book was a "deliberate, honest and often repetitious account of a life spent in the energetic pursuit of a demanding and exacting career."

In My Fashion has become an important historical document of mid-century fashion and the inner workings of one of the industry's most influential publications.

== Personal life ==
Ballard was known for her distinctive personal style, which was sophisticated yet practical. Described as a "tall, slender, energetic woman with reddish brown hair and a ready smile," she was particularly fond of bright colors but never wore much jewelry and often appeared in clothes designed by Balenciaga. Her wardrobe choices were influential in the fashion world, and she was known to have owned several Balenciaga pieces, some of which she later donated to The Costume Institute at The Metropolitan Museum of Art.

As noted in her memoir, Ballard developed a personal aesthetic through her interactions with couturiers in Paris. This aesthetic later became identifiable in the pages of Vogue through her editorial choices. Fashion historian Grace Mirabella described Ballard as "a legend" and "a striking-looking if not beautiful woman of epic grandeur, with a long, shortish nose. She was a craggy dame on spike heels."

== Death and legacy ==
Ballard died of cancer on March 2, 1961, at her home at 123 East Seventy-seventh Street in New York City. She was 56 years old. At the time of her death, she was still actively working as a fashion consultant, lecturer, and contributing writer for Town & Country magazine.

Ballard's contributions to fashion journalism have been recognized by fashion historians. Her memoir provides valuable insights into the evolution of fashion media and the changing landscape of international fashion in the mid-20th century. Several of her clothing donations to The Metropolitan Museum of Art's Costume Institute continue to serve as important examples of mid-century haute couture.

Her firsthand accounts of Paris openings, the inner workings of Vogue, and the fashion designers, illustrators, and photographers who helped disseminate fashion news remain critical to understanding the history of fashion journalism. Ballard's ability to balance her appreciation for European craftsmanship with an emerging American aesthetic helped shape Vogue's editorial direction during a pivotal period of transition in fashion history.
