= Christopher Plunkett, 8th Baron of Dunsany =

Irish noble

Christopher Plunkett, 8th Baron of Dunsany (died 1603) was an Irish nobleman.

== Family ==
Plunkett was the son of Patrick, the 7th Baron of Dunsany, and Mary Barnewall, 11th youngest daughter of the knight Christopher Barnewall of Turvey. His date of birth is unknown but he was born by 1572, and his future marriage to another of his grandfather's daughters was pledged in that year. He succeeded to the title on the death of his father in 1601 or 1602.

== The Babington Plot and marriage ==
Plunkett was allegedly involved in the Babington Plot, involving an attempt to free Mary Queen of Scots, and which led to treason charges against her, in 1586, and fled Britain on its discovery. Around 1592 he spent some time in debtors' prison over a sum of 100 pounds, a matter his father complained of to Lord Burghley.

By 1595 he was married, but not in accordance with the pledge his father had made that he would be married to one of his aunts. Rather he married Madeline or Maud Babington, daughter of Henry, of Dethick, Derbyshire; the family were related to the eponymous Anthony Babington of the plot.

== Death and succession ==
He died on 15 December 1603. He was buried at Dunsany and his widow retired to Castleknock, nearer Dublin. The dowager Lady Dunsany was murdered on 19 March 1609 and a servant, Honora ny Caffry, was burned at the stake for the petty treason of the murder of a mistress. Another, a man, later confessed to the murder.

Peerage of Ireland
Preceded by Patrick Plunkett	Baron Dunsany; 1601/1602 - 1603	Succeeded by Patrick Plunkett
