= Christopher Plunkett, 1st Baron of Dunsany =

Anglo-Norman noble, 15th century

Christopher Plunkett, 1st Baron of Dunsany (c. 1410 – 1462) was an Anglo-Norman peer. He was the second son of Sir Christopher Plunkett and Genet de Cusack.

== Family background and early life ==
The elder Christopher Plunkett of Rathregan, County Meath, had married in 1399, Lady Joan de Cusack, heiress of Killeen and Dunsany; she was the daughter of Sir Lucas de Cusack, Lord of Killeen. Sir Christopher and Lady Joan's two oldest children were male. John, the elder, inherited Killeen Castle and estate and Christopher, the younger, inherited Dunsany Castle and estate.

=== Creation of the Dunsany peerage ===
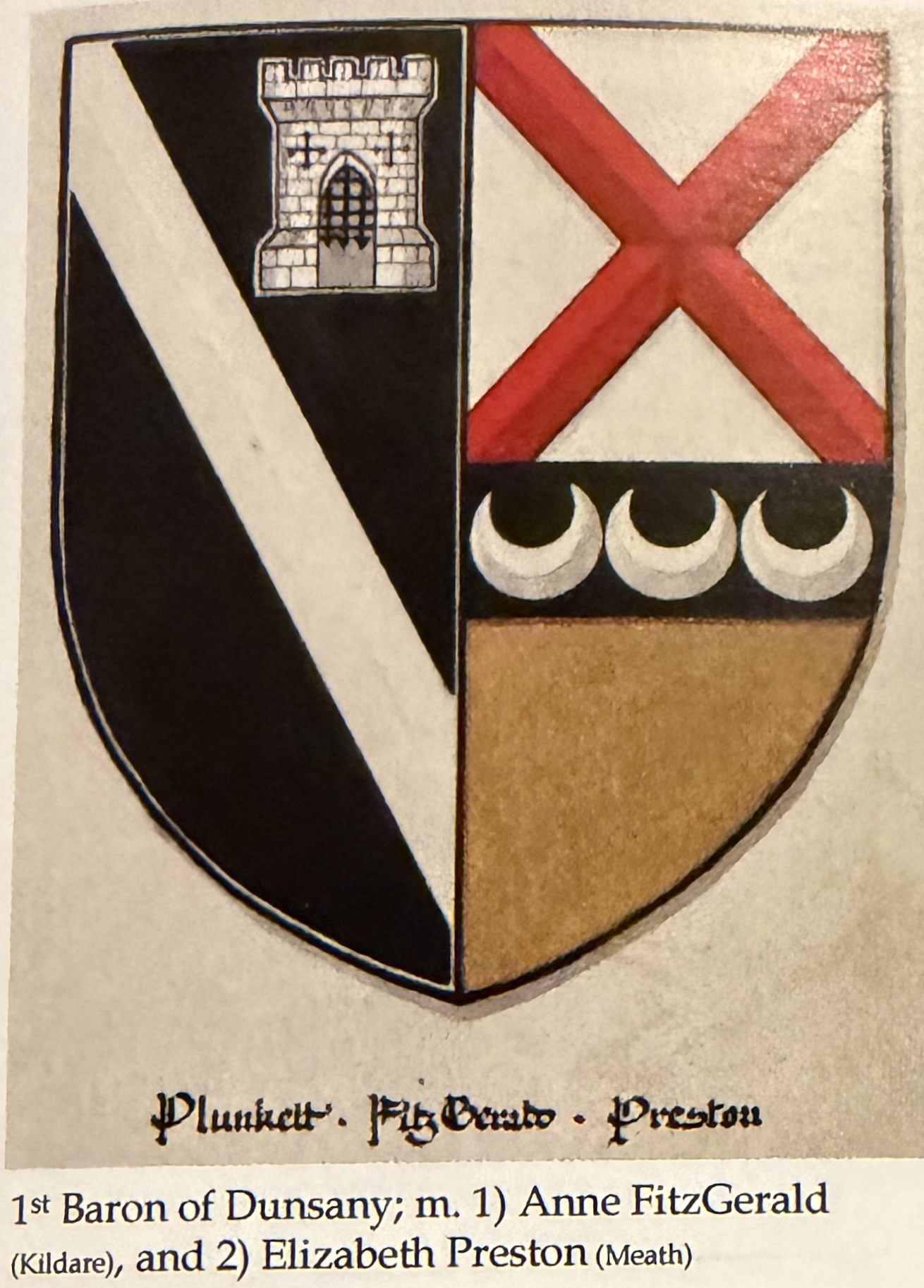
Shield (arms) of Christopher, 1st Baron Dunsany, impaled with those of his two wives

A charter of 1439, a few years before his father's death, refers to the younger Sir Christopher as lord of the manor of Dunsany (Dns. de Dunsany). He is referred to by William Camden, in the following century, as being the first Baron of Dunsany, that is to say, a hereditary member of the Irish House of Lords. What year he became a peer is uncertain. The first reference to the Dunsanys as peers is in the role of the two Irish earls and eleven Irish barons who met with Henry VII of England and Ireland at Greenwich in 1489; the third Lord Dunsany, Sir Christopher's grandson, is listed last of the eleven, after Lord Trimleston and some Irish parliament lists use almost the same order of precedence. The date of the patent of the Barony of Trimleston is known to be 4 March 1462; it is one of two baronial patents that survive. Cokayne concludes, in the Complete Peerage, that, if this precedence represents the date of creation, then, since Sir Christopher's will is dated 1 August 1461, probably shortly before his death, the Barony of Dunsany was created around that year. The Complete Peerage also notes, however, that the order of precedence was likely to reflect the relative importance of the lords, rather than the age of their titles. Debrett's single sentence on the subject describes the charter of 1439 as a writ, although Cokayne denies that Ireland recognised the creation of peerages by writ.

== Personal life ==
Plunkett married firstly Anne FitzGerald, daughter and heiress of Richard FitzGerald of Ballysonan, County Kildare and his wife Julia de Castlemartin, daughter of Nicholas de Castlemartin and widow of Richard Wellesley. Richard FitzGerald was reputedly a natural son of Gerald FitzGerald, 5th Earl of Kildare. Christopher and Anne had issue, including Richard, his heir, and John. He married secondly Elizabeth Preston, daughter of Christopher Preston, 3rd Baron Gormanston and Jane d'Artois, granddaughter of the soldier and statesman Sir Jenico d'Artois.

Christopher Plunkett's will is preserved in the Lambeth Palace library. He left many specific bequests, his lands as per an entail, and in his title, he was succeeded by his eldest son Richard Plunkett, 2nd Baron of Dunsany, one of five named in the will.

Peerage of Ireland
New creation	Baron of Dunsany; 1439 or 1462? – c. 1462	Succeeded by Richard Plunkett
