= Randal Plunkett, 21st Baron of Dunsany =

Film director, landowner, aristocrat and rewilding advocate

The Right Honourable The Lord Dunsany
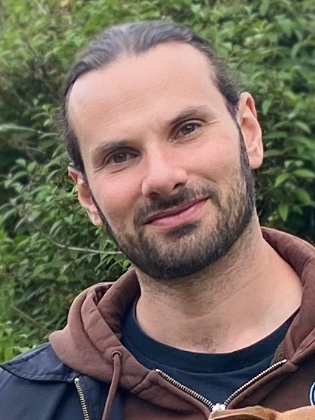
- Dunsany in 2021
- Born: 9 March 1983 (age 43); New York City, U.S.
- Education: Headfort School; The King's Hospital; Institut Le Rosey; Kingston University
- Occupations: Film director, property owner, rewilding advocate
- Years active: 2009–present
- Known for: Rewilding, filmmaking
- Spouse: Laura Dillon
- Children: 1 daughter, 1 stepdaughter
- Parents: Edward Plunkett, 20th Baron of Dunsany (father); Maria Alice de Marsillac Plunkett (mother)

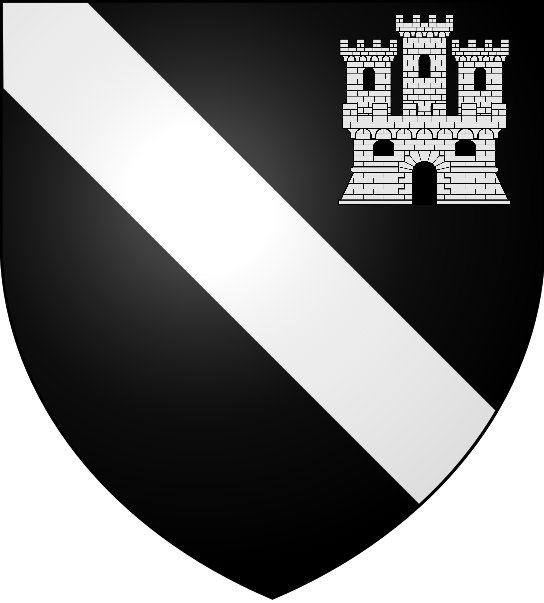
Arms of Lord Dunsany

Randal Plunkett, 21st Baron of Dunsany (born 9 March 1983), is an Irish filmmaker, landowner and rewilding advocate. He holds Dunsany Castle, one of the longest-inhabited houses in Ireland, and its remaining estate.

Lord Dunsany succeeded to the Dunsany title upon the death of his father in May 2011. In his professional life, he has directed a range of film shorts, worked on several dozen other film projects, and provided location and post-production services from his demesne. He produced his first feature film, The Green Sea, in 2018–2019 and released it in 2021. Dunsany became an advocate for rewilding in 2014 and has dedicated around half of the ancestral estate in County Meath as Ireland's largest private nature reserve.

== Early life and education ==
Plunkett was born on 8 March 1983 in New York City, where his parents were living at the time operating an architectural and design studio. He is the elder of the two children (both sons) of the 20th Baron of Dunsany, the painter, sculptor and designer also known as Eddie Plunkett, and his Brazilian wife, architect Maria Alice de Marsillac Plunkett (née Villela de Carvalho). Aside from his younger brother Oliver, he has a half-sister Joana and a half-brother Daniel, both older, and the four children grew up together. On the paternal side, he is the great-grandson of the 18th Baron of Dunsany (usually known as Lord Dunsany) and grandson of his half-Brazilian namesake, Lieutenant Colonel Randal Plunkett, an officer in the British Indian Army. He is also descended from the Earls of Jersey, and the family of explorer Sir Richard Burton. On the maternal side, his grandfather was a colonel turned architect.

Plunkett subsequently lived with his family in London and at Dunsany Castle. For primary school, he attended a local school and the private Headfort School outside Kells. He took his Junior Certificate at The King's Hospital on the outskirts of Dublin. He pursued senior secondary studies at Institut Le Rosey, a boarding school in Rolle and Gstaad, Switzerland, and at a pre-college centre in Oxford, where he studied the classics, English literature and sociology; he credited some of his inspiration around film to one of his teachers there, Louise Longson.

Plunkett studied for a degree in Film Studies at Kingston University in southern London. After graduation, he worked on a potential career in sports science, considering opening a gym, or working as a personal trainer. However, encouraged by his parents, he later returned to the idea of working in film, and pursued an intensive course in Digital Video with an emphasis on practical skills, at the SAE Institute, from the Amsterdam campus of which he graduated with a diploma. He subsequently studied further at the SAE branch in London, where he met a future collaborator, cinematographer Stefano Battarola.

=== Peerage succession ===
Plunkett succeeded to the title of Baron of Dunsany on 24 May 2011, upon the death of his father. He continues to live at Dunsany Castle, on its estate of over 1,500 acres (610 ha), near Dunshaughlin and Kilmessan, about 30 km (19 mi) north of Dublin. While the estate was reduced in size under the Irish Land Acts, with much farmland transferred to tenants, it remains a substantial landholding, between Dunshaughlin and the Hill of Tara. The current heir to his title is his younger brother, Oliver, a games designer and programmer.

== Career ==
Lord Dunsany began his filmmaking career around 2009, producing and directing a range of short films, which have been shown at various film festivals. His directorial debut was the thriller Kiss Kiss (2010), set in London, and shown at the Leicester Square Odeon. He then returned to Ireland, producing Guerrilla, directed by Blaine Rennicks and starring Jack Lowe and Darren Killeen, on the Dunsany lands from winter 2009. The low-budget film, with a crew of 40, was based on a concept of Ireland under martial law after social collapse in Europe in 2013, and was released in 2010. This was followed by the horror film Prey (2011). Dunsany's fourth short film, written with some autobiographical elements, was Walt (2011). Dunsany has used his estate lands and buildings, some partly ruinous, as locations for much of his filming after Guerrilla, including for Prey and Walt.

=== Out There and production work ===
Dunsany received external private funding for his next film, a post-apocalyptic horror movie titled Out There, co-writing the script with his brother Oliver. Out There was awarded Best Industry Short at the Limerick Film Festival as well as Best Short Movie at a festival in Germany. Subsequently, it was selected to play Cannes Film Festival.

In 2010, the then Randal Plunkett established Dunsany Productions, a film production company, at Dunsany Castle. He worked on more than 40 film projects in Ireland, in various production roles, and in post-production at his facilities at Dunsany, while looking to produce longer work of his own.

=== The Green Sea ===
Lord Dunsany's first feature-length film, the drama The Green Sea, was filmed in Mullingar in County Westmeath, as well as in Dublin, at Brittas Bay in County Wicklow, and at Dunsany, where one lodge was painted black for the production; about half the scenes were from Mullingar. It was filmed and produced 2018–2019 but only released, after Covid-related delays, mid-2021. Dunsany was director, scriptwriter and executive producer. Dunsany performed the editing himself, alongside Chris Gill. Plunkett has described the film as having semi-autobiographical influences. The film received a fairly positive review in The Guardian. Lord Dunsany's work and the film itself were awarded as Best Feature Film at the Paris Play Film Festival, April 2021, Best Indie Feature Film and Best Feature Script at the Florence Film Awards, April 2021, and Best Production and Best Editing at the New York Movie Awards, April 2021.

== Rewilding ==
Lord Dunsany is a practitioner of and advocate for rewilding. He became a vegan in 2014, and discovered rewilding around the same time. Having initially moved the Dunsany Estate to organic farming, and having discontinued chemical pesticide usage, he subsequently designated 750 acres (300 ha) of the Dunsany Estate (of at least 1,500 acres) as a nature preserve, with several hundred acres of forestry, and with farming on the remaining land limited to crops such as wheat, rapeseed and beans only. Dunsany Nature Reserve is Ireland's largest privately owned nature reserve, and as of 2022 is the only Irish rewilding project recognised by the European Rewilding Network. A number of animals have returned to the estate and it has grown in biological diversity. Lord Dunsany has also banned hunting on his lands, which he has said resulted in threats. Small groups are allowed a visit by arrangement, but Dunsany has said he does not plan structured paths and signage, or visitor attraction facilities such as a café. The rewilding project receives no external funding, State or private, although around 14,000 euro was allocated in 2020 by the Department of Tourism, Culture, Arts, Gaeltacht, Sport and Media for urgent works on the castle and walled garden, on which he and his family and staff have been working. The potential revival of a former railway line which used to pass through the estate near the River Skane has been noted as a concern.

== Personal life ==
Plunkett's father died in 2011 after a long illness. His mother died in 2020; they are buried on the estate together.

Having previously been in a relationship with Irish actress Emma Eliza Regan, Lord Dunsany met occupational therapist Laura Dillon, in Mullingar. Dunsany and Dillon announced their engagement formally in November 2020. The heir to the castle and estate is their daughter. Dunsany has stated that his child will inherit the property, while as of 2022 the title would still pass elsewhere, due to what he has described as medieval provisions reserving inheritance of most titles to males, but he has expressed hope this situation may be changed. Lord Dunsany is Catholic. Dunsany and Dillon subsequently married.

== Popular culture ==
In 2013, Lord Dunsany appeared in the final episode of the second series of TLC's reality television series Secret Princes, in which his brother Oliver was appearing as a series regular.

In 2025, Dunsany published a memoir, which discusses his rewilding work extensively.

== Descent ==
Ancestors of Randal Plunkett, 21st Baron of Dunsany

16. John Plunkett, 17th Baron of Dunsany
8. Edward Plunkett, 18th Baron of Dunsany
17. Ernle Elizabeth Louisa Maria Grosvenor Ernle-Erle-Drax, formerly Burton
4. Randal Plunkett, 19th Baron of Dunsany
18. Victor Child Villiers, 7th Earl of Jersey
9. Lady Beatrice Child Villiers
19. Hon. Margaret Leigh
2. Edward Plunkett, 20th Baron of Dunsany
20. Olímpio de Abreu e Sá Souto Maior
10. Genésio de Sá Souto Maior
21. Francisca Placidina de Andrade
5. Vera de Sá Souto Maior
22. Christian Ludwig Wilhelm Quentel
11. Julieta de Sampaio Quentel
23. Ana de Sampaio
1. Randal Plunkett, 21st Baron of Dunsany
6. Scipião de Carvalho
3. Maria Alice de Marsillac Plunkett

== Sources ==
- Dunsany Productions website

Peerage of Ireland
Preceded by Edward Plunkett	Baron of Dunsany; 2011–present	Incumbent
