= Christopher Plunkett, 6th Baron of Dunsany =

Irish noble

Christopher Plunkett, 6th Baron of Dunsany (died 1564 or 1565) was an Irish nobleman.

== Family ==
He was the second son of Robert Plunkett Baron of Dunsany, and his wife Eleanor (née Darcy), daughter of the Lord Treasurer of Ireland, Sir William Darcy, of Platten. John Hussey, 7th Baron Galtrim. He succeeded his father in the title in 1556, as his elder brother John had predeceased him. His niece, John's daughter Elizabeth, the heir general of Dunsany, married Nicholas Hollywood of Artane, Dublin, and they had two sons, Christopher and Nicholas.

Plunkett married Elizabeth Barnewall, daughter of Christopher Barnewall, Knight, of Crickstown. He died between 29 May 1564 and 28 August 1565, and was succeeded by his son, Patrick. His widow later remarried.

Peerage of Ireland
Preceded by Robert Plunkett	Baron Dunsany; 1556–1564 or 65	Succeeded by Patrick Plunkett
