= Thomas Eustace, 1st Viscount Baltinglass =

Anglo-Irish landowner

Thomas Eustace, 1st Viscount Baltinglass (c. 1480-1549) was an Anglo-Irish noble who achieved wealth and influence by prudently remaining loyal to the English Crown. He was born circa 1480 at Caslemartin, County Kildare.

== Family ==
He was the son of Richard Eustace (died before 1496), younger son of Sir Edward FitzEustace, Lord Deputy of Ireland, and Anne, daughter of Robert Eustace of Ballyloughrane. He married Margaret Talbot, daughter of Sir Peter Talbot of Malahide Castle and Catherine FitzGerald. He died on 31 July 1549.

On 14 December 1496, when only sixteen, he succeeded his uncle, Rowland FitzEustace, 1st Baron Portlester, in the family estates. Portlester's daughter Alison married Gerald FitzGerald, 8th Earl of Kildare and was the grandmother of Silken Thomas, hence the strong pressure on the Eustace clan to join Thomas' rebellion.

== Career ==
He was High Sheriff of Kildare in 1523 and was knighted, but little else is known of him until about 1534.

During the Silken Thomas rebellion, when the Eustace family were deeply divided, due to the close family tie between the Eustace and Fitzgerald families, he remained loyal to Henry VIII and was duly rewarded for his assistance in putting down the rebellion by being created Baron Kilcullen in the Peerage of Ireland in September 1535. He is said to have possessed one-half of County Wicklow, together with his family's existing possessions in Kildare and County Meath, and benefited from the Dissolution of the Monasteries.

He played a prominent part in the Irish Parliament of 1541-2. The Parliament is chiefly remembered for passing the Crown of Ireland Act 1542 by which Henry VIII took the title King of Ireland, in preference to the earlier Lordship of Ireland.

As a reward for further actions in putting down the rebellion, he was created Viscount Baltinglass, a title also in the Peerage of Ireland, on 29 June 1541. His principal residence was Harristown, Naas South, County Kildare; he died at New Abbey, Kilcullen.

== Children ==
Children of Sir Thomas Eustace, 1st Viscount Baltinglass and Margaret Talbot

- Richard Eustace
- Alexander Eustace
- Robert Eustace
- John Eustace, High Sheriff of Kildare
- Rowland Eustace, 2nd Viscount Baltinglass+ b. c 1505, d. 31 Mar 1578
- Anne Eustace, who married firstly an O'Toole and secondly Nicholas Eustace
- Janet Eustace, who married firstly Gerald Sutton and secondly Maurice Fitzgerald
- Margaret Eustace who married George Burnell
- Catherine Eustace who married firstly James FitzGerald and secondly Gerald Plunkett, younger son of Robert Plunkett, 5th Baron of Dunsany.

Peerage of Ireland
New creation	Viscount Baltinglass; 1541–1549	Succeeded by Rowland Eustace
New creation	Baron Kilcullen; 1535–1549	Succeeded by Rowland Eustace
