= Rowland FitzEustace, 1st Baron Portlester =

Irish peer, statesman and judge

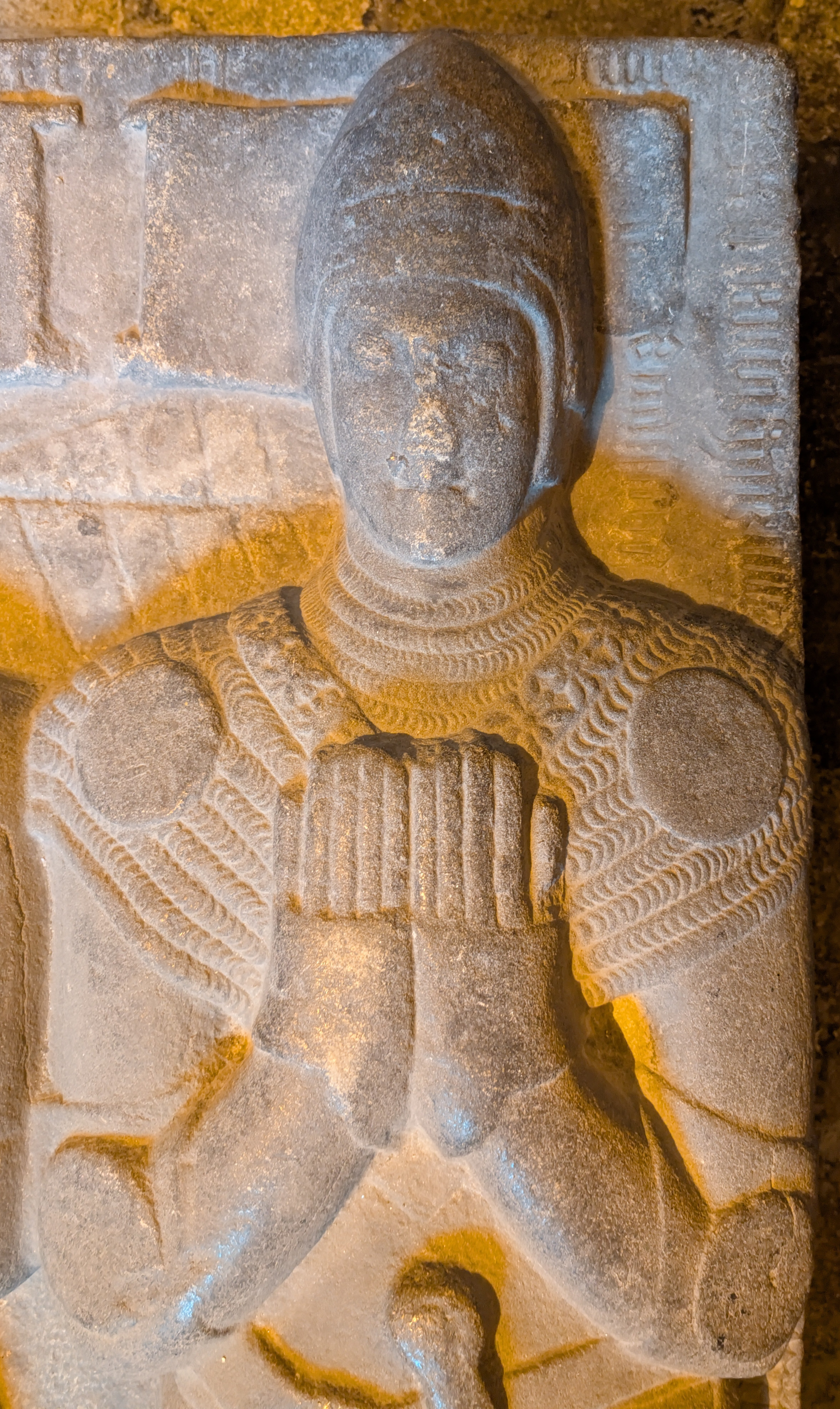
Right side of funerary effigy depicting Rowland FitzEustace, in St. Audoen's Church, Dublin

Rowland FitzEustace, 1st Baron Portlester (c. 1430 – 19 December 1496) was an Irish peer, statesman and judge. He was one of the dominant political figures in late fifteenth-century Ireland, rivalled in influence probably only by his son-in-law Garret FitzGerald, the "Great" Earl of Kildare.

== Career ==
FitzEustace was the eldest son of Sir Edward FitzEustace of Castlemartin, County Kildare, Lord Deputy of Ireland, and his wife, Alicia. He belonged to one of the most prominent of the "Old English" families of the Pale, which had several branches. He was called to the Bar in England in about 1454, and soon afterwards became Chief Clerk to the Court of King's Bench and the Court of Common Pleas. He was appointed Lord Chancellor of Ireland and Lord Treasurer of Ireland by King Edward IV of England in 1474, and was elevated to the Irish peerage as Baron Portlester in 1462.

In the latter year (1462), he was accused of treason, but defended himself with such vigour that the charges were dropped: similar charges made against him in 1470 were not pursued. In 1474, he was a founder member of the Brotherhood of Saint George, a short-lived military order charged with the defence of the Pale (the four counties nearest to Dublin), the only part of Ireland which was under secure English rule.

In 1478, when his son-in-law, Gerald FitzGerald, 8th Earl of Kildare, was replaced as Lord Deputy of Ireland by Lord Grey, Portlester organised a campaign of non-co-operation with the new Deputy. Grey ordered him to hand over the Great Seal of Ireland, but Portlester refused point-blank, thus making the conduct of official business impossible. The King went to considerable lengths to support Grey. He ordered Thomas Archbold (alias Galmole), the Master of the Royal Mint in Ireland, to strike a new Great Seal, declaring that the Seal held by Portlester was annulled and that all acts passed under it were utterly void, but these efforts were to no avail. So effective was the campaign of obstruction that after a few months Lord Grey was forced to return to England.

Portlester was reappointed Chancellor by Edward IV, and following the change of dynasty in 1485 he was confirmed in office by Henry VII, but later removed because of his part in the crowning of the pretender, Lambert Simnel, as King Edward VI of England, on 24 May 1487. This coronation took place in Christ Church Cathedral, Dublin, Ireland. Nearly every noble and Prince in Ireland took part in the ceremony. Simnel invaded England with an Irish army which was crushed at the Battle of Stoke. Henry VII was magnanimous in victory, sparing Simnel's life and issuing pardons to Portlester and his fellow peers; but he decided to split the offices held by Lord Portlester between Alexander Plunket and Sir James Ormond. Portlester nonetheless remained an influential figure for the remaining decade of his life, and was able to fight off an attack on his record as Treasurer in 1493.

== Family ==
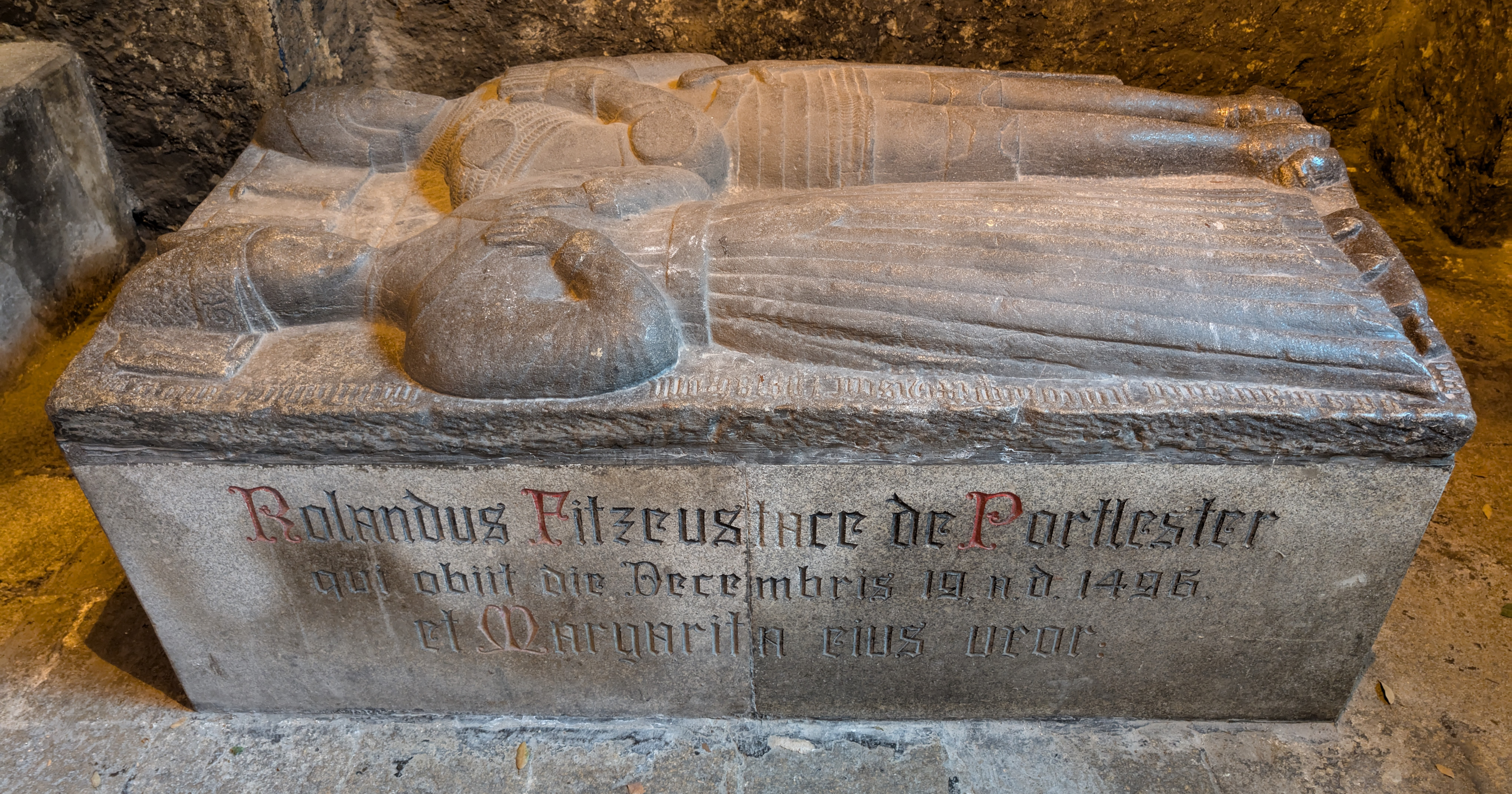
Funerary effigy of Rowland FitzEustace (above) and his third wife Margaret or Marguerite d'Artois (below)

He was married three times. His wives were:

- Elizabeth Brune, daughter of John Brune
- Joan (or Jenet) Bellew of Bellewstown, widow of Christopher Plunket, 2nd Baron Killeen, whom he married in 1463
- Margaret (or Marguerite) d'Artois (or Jenico), granddaughter and heiress of the Gascon-born knight Sir Jenico d'Artois, and widow of Sir John Dowdall, whom he married sometime after 1467. Since their daughter Katherine was legitimised by act of Parliament in 1475–6, it appears that they cohabited before marriage. This marriage brought him a considerable increase in his landholdings, since Margaret through her mother Jane Serjeant was heiress to half of the lands of Castleknock, County Dublin, although her right to hold the lands was disputed by the Barnewall family, in right of Margaret's sister Ismay.

He had issue with all of his wives, but it is uncertain in some cases which wife was the mother of which child. Joan is thought to have been Elizabeth's daughter, while Katherine and Alison were Margaret's. His only legitimate son, Richard, died young.

His daughters were:

- Alice, or Alison (died 1495), married Gerald FitzGerald, 8th Earl of Kildare.
- Joan, married firstly Richard Plunkett, 2nd Baron of Dunsany, and secondly her cousin Sir Maurice FitzEustace of Coghlanstown, eldest son and heir of Sir Robert FitzEustace.
- Jenet, married Sir Walter Delahide: both played an important role in the rebellion of the Earl of Kildare's grandson, Silken Thomas, as did their sons. Jenet died in prison under suspicion of treason, and her sons were attainted as traitors.
- Margaret, married Christopher Rochfort
- Maud, married Thomas Marward, titular Baron Skryne
- Katherine, his second daughter by Margaret d"Artois, born out of wedlock but legitimated by Act of the Parliament of Ireland in 1475–6.

He also had an illegitimate son:

- Oliver FitzEustace, who became Chief Baron of the Irish Exchequer; since Oliver seems to have been mentally deficient, his father further extended his influence by appointing Deputies to act on his behalf.

The barony became extinct on his death in 1496, but his nephew Thomas, son of his brother Richard, was created Viscount Baltinglass in 1541. Sir Maurice Eustace, a wealthy and influential member of the FitzEustace clan who became Lord Chancellor of Ireland, accepted the title Baron Portlester at the Restoration of Charles II, but then changed his mind, apparently because, like Rowland, he had no legitimate son to succeed him.

== Reputation ==
Elrington Ball regarded him as perhaps the most important Irish political figure during his 40-year career, more influential even than his son-in-law, the "Great Earl of Kildare".

== Memorial ==
There is a memorial to him and his third wife Margaret Jenico d'Artois in St. Audoen's Church, Dublin, erected in 1482. It is suggested that his private chapel was founded there in gratitude for his preservation from a shipwreck near the site. He founded New Abbey, Kilcullen, where he is buried beside his daughter Alison. His estates passed to his nephew Thomas Eustace, 1st Viscount Baltinglass.

Peerage of Ireland
New creation	Baron Portlester; 1462–1496	Extinct
