= Rowland Eustace, 2nd Viscount Baltinglass =

Irish noble (1505–1578)

Roland Eustace, 2nd Viscount Baltinglass of Harristown, County Kildare, Ireland, was born in 1505 and died in 1578. He was the son of Sir Thomas Eustace (1480–1549), 1st Viscount Baltinglass and Margaret Talbot, daughter of Sir Peter Talbot of Malahide Castle, County Dublin.

== Early life ==
Little is known of his early life except that he seems to have lived at Blackrath (Calverston) until succeeding to the Baltinglass title and family estate at Harristown in 1549. This branch of the Eustace family held strongly to the Catholic faith through the Reformation. As a boy, Roland's father had completed New Abbey near Kilcullen which was dissolved by Henry VIII in 1539. In 1558, he took his seat in the first Irish Parliament of Queen Elizabeth, but strongly opposed her Act of Uniformity of that year and for this and other actions, he was ordered to be arrested in 1567 and conveyed to London, but the order was not carried out. During the interval, however, he had been commissioned as one of the Justices of the Peace for County Kildare during the temporary absence of the Lord Deputy in 1561.

== Family ==
Roland Eustace married Joan, daughter of James Butler, 8th Baron Dunboyne in about 1528. They had six sons and two daughters. The daughters were:

- Joan, who married Barnaby Fitzpatrick, 2nd Baron Upper Ossory; and
- Eleanor, who married Sir Edmund Butler of Cloughgrenan, second son of the 9th Earl of Ormond, and was the mother of Catherine, fourth wife of William Eustace of Castlemartin.

The sons were:

- James Eustace, 3rd Viscount Baltinglass, (1530–1585)
- Edmund, who married Frances Pipho and secondly Joan, daughter of Richard Walsh of Carrickmines. Edmund was involved with his brothers in the Baltinglass Rebellion and escaped to Scotland in 1583 and later to Spain where he served in the Armada in 1588. He died childless in Portugal in 1597;
- Thomas, was executed in 1582 for his involvement in the Baltinglass Rebellion.
- William, fourth son was believed to have been slain in battle in 1581, for it was officially reported to Sir Francis Walsingham, Secretary of State in London, "Head of William Eustace, another Baltinglass brethren, taken this morning." This report may not have been true because a branch of the Eustace family at Robertstown, County Kildare later made an unsuccessful claim to the Baltinglass title.
- Walter Eustace was captured in 1583 and executed.
- Richard Eustace, was living in Paris at the time of the Rebellion arranging for the delivery of ammunition and supplies to aid his brothers. He later became a priest in Rome.

Peerage of Ireland
Preceded by Thomas Eustace	Viscount Baltinglass; 1549–1578	Succeeded by James Eustace
