= Edward Plunkett, 14th Baron of Dunsany =

Anglo-Irish peer (1773–1848)

Edward Plunkett

Irish representative peer
- In office 1836-1848

Personal details
- Born: 7 April 1773
- Died: 11 December 1848 (aged 75)
- Political party: Conservative
- Spouse(s): Charlotte Lawless (m. 1803; died 1818) Eliza Kinnaird (m. 1823)
- Children: 3, including Randall

Edward Wadding Plunkett, 14th Baron Dunsany (7 April 1773 – 11 December 1848) was an Anglo-Irish peer.

== Biography ==
He was the son of Randall Plunkett, 13th Baron of Dunsany, and Margaret Mandeville, and he inherited his father's title of Baron of Dunsany on 4 April 1821. Between 1835 and his death he was Lord Lieutenant of Meath. On 18 January 1836, he was elected as an Irish representative peer and took his seat in the House of Lords as a Conservative.

On 20 June 1803, he married Hon. Charlotte Louisa Lawless, a daughter of Nicholas Lawless, 1st Baron Cloncurry. They had two sons (Randall and Edward, both of whom would succeed to their father's title in turn) and one daughter. After his first wife's death in 1818, he married secondly Hon. Eliza Kinnaird, a daughter of George Kinnaird, 7th Lord Kinnaird, on 26 March 1823.

Political offices
Preceded by The Earl of Charleville	Representative peer for Ireland; 1836–1848	Succeeded by The Lord Clarina
Honorary titles
Preceded by The Earl of Darnley	Lord Lieutenant of Meath; 1835–1848	Succeeded by The Earl of Fingall
Peerage of Ireland
Preceded by Randall Plunkett	Baron of Dunsany; 1821–1848	Succeeded by Randall Edward Plunkett
