= Edward Plunkett, 20th Baron of Dunsany =

Irish artist and peer (1939–2011)

The Right Honourable The Lord Dunsany
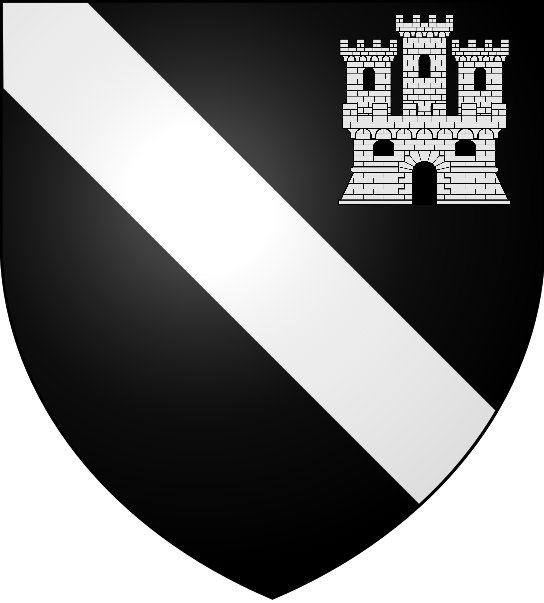
- Born: 10 September 1939; Dublin, Ireland
- Died: 24 May 2011 (aged 71)
- Occupation: Artist
- Spouse: Maria Alice de Marsillac Plunkett (m. 1982)
- Children: 2, including Randal
- Father: Randal Plunkett, 19th Baron of Dunsany

Edward John Carlos Plunkett, 20th Baron of Dunsany (10 September 1939–24 May 2011), was a modern artist (painter and sculptor), landowner and holder of one of the oldest remaining titles in the Peerage of Ireland. He was the grandson of the author Lord Dunsany. He succeeded to his title in 1999 on the death of his father Randal, 19th Baron of Dunsany.

== Early life ==
Plunkett was born in Dublin on September 10, 1939, and brought to Brazil for the years of World War II, returning to Ireland at the age of 7, speaking only Brazilian Portuguese. His parents were divorced in 1947, and he was brought up by his grandparents (he was estranged from his father, and his mother lived primarily in Brazil). Plunkett was educated at Eton College and the Slade School of Fine Art (1957 to 1960), where he showed himself to be a skilled draughtsman.

== Career ==
Plunkett apprenticed with Loio Persio in Rio de Janeiro from 1961 to 1962, and worked and studied gravure with S.W. Hayter in Paris in 1962. He then attended the Ecole des Beaux-Arts in Paris from 1962 to 1964. By then an experienced artist in paint and pencil, who later added architectural studies and design work to his skills, Plunkett worked next at Vence in the south of France, where he was the resident painter at the Foundation Karolyi in 1969, then moved to Rome, where he established a studio in Trastevere. Sometime after a major exhibition in Rome in 1975, he suffered a breakdown in a major partnership and lost much of his art.

Plunkett moved to the USA in 1977, where he developed a studio in Manhattan, New York and took up design as a significant area of work. While in New York, he married and co-founded de Marsillac Plunkett Inc, Designers and Architects, a New York-based partnership for which he provided design elements for his wife's architectural work.

In 1991 Plunkett and his family moved to London, where he kept a studio from 1991 to 1993. He returned to the family's Dunsany estate near the Hill of Tara in 1994, and set up his main studio in the old Estate Office in the castle. While in Ireland, he did design work for companies working with glass bottles, including mineral water and champagne suppliers.

He was primarily a painter, but also produced sculptures designed by him and manufactured in France or the UK. He painted official portraits of two former Taoisigh (Prime Ministers) of Ireland, Charles Haughey and John Bruton.

Plunkett was exhibited on multiple occasions, the last public showing being a one-man exhibition in Rome. His appearances included:

- 1968: Mayor Gallery, London
- 1969: ICA, London - "Young and Fantastic" (group exhibition)
- 1970: Living Irish Artists, Dublin and Belfast (group exhibition)
- 1971: ROSC, Galway (group exhibition)
- 1972: The Agnew Somerville Gallery, Dublin
- 1972: The Graphic Biennale, Krakow (group exhibition)
- 1974: Mayor Gallery, London
- 1974: Galleria deli'Obelisco, Roma (group exhibition)
- 1975: Galleria Il Collezionista d'Arte Contemporarea
- 2005: Galleria Candido Portinari, Palazzo Pamphilj, Rome

He was also successful at product design. His last architectural work was the contemporary conversion of an 18th-century wing of Dunsany Castle into a studio and exhibition area. It is called The Plunkett Gallery and it houses Lord Dunsany's paintings, lithographs, drawings, architectural projects, sculptures and designed objects (perfume bottles, Champagne bottles, and numbered editions of vases and dinner services); the gallery is open to visitors by appointment.

Aside from the gallery at Dunsany Castle, Plunkett's work is held by, among others, the Hugh Lane Municipal Gallery in Dublin, the Arts Council of Ireland, the Irish State and its Office of Public Works, the British Board of Works, the National Museum of Poland at Wroclaw and the Centre for Contemporary Art in Toronto, Canada.

== Personal life ==
In 1982, Plunkett married Maria Alice de Marsillac Plunkett, a Brazilian architect and designer, later châtelaine of Dunsany Castle and styled Lady Dunsany. Plunkett and his wife lived at Dunsany Castle, Dunsany, County Meath, Ireland. They had two sons, Randal Plunkett, 21st Baron of Dunsany, and Oliver Plunkett. In addition, he had two stepchildren. Their father was his first cousin and great friend, Jayme de Marsillac.

Plunkett died in May 2011, after some years of a chronic illness, progressive supranuclear palsy (PSP). A private funeral with his widow, sons and step-children, sister, close family friends and staff, was conducted within the ancestral castle. He was buried in the grounds, by the Church of St. Nicholas, the reconsecration of which he had helped arrange for his stepson's marriage. The six pallbearers were his sons and stepson, a family friend and Dunsany curator, and two members of the Castle staff. A memorial service was held in Dunsany Parish Church a week after the funeral.

== External sources ==
- Edward Plunkett's website as artist
- Dunsany.net (family website)
- Obituary of Lord Dunsany, The Daily Telegraph, 14 June 2011
- Obituary of Lord Dunsany, The Meath Chronicle, 6 June 2011

Peerage of Ireland
Preceded by Randal Plunkett	Baron of Dunsany; 1999–2011	Succeeded by Randal Plunkett
