= Baron of Dunsany =

Irish peerage title

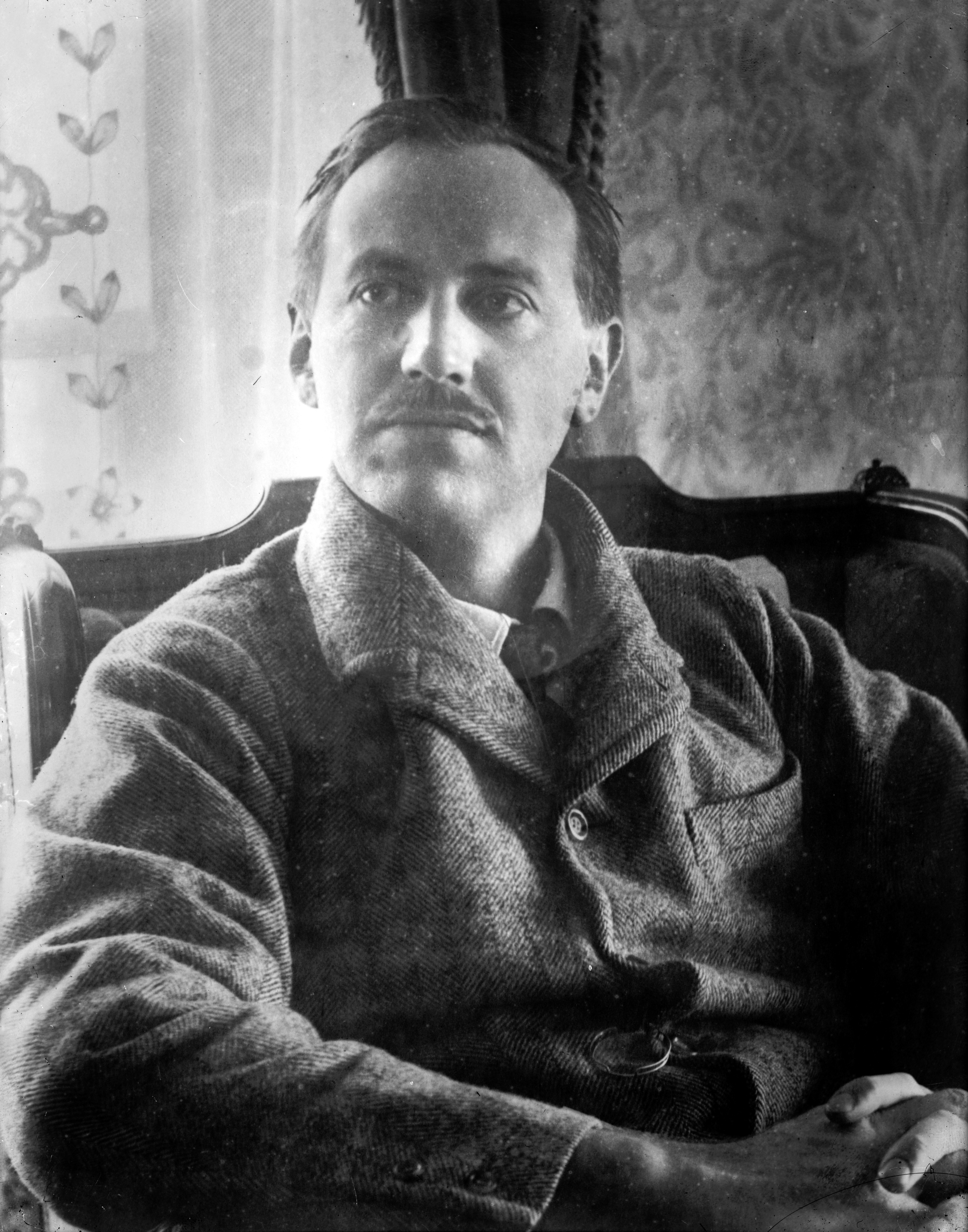
Edward, 18th Baron of Dunsany (1878–1957)

The title Baron of Dunsany or, more commonly, Lord Dunsany, is one of the oldest (1439 or 1461/2) dignities in the Peerage of Ireland, one of just a handful of 13th- to 15th-century titles still extant, having had 21 holders, of the Plunkett name, to date. Other surviving medieval baronies include Kerry (1223, now a subsidiary title of the Marquess of Lansdowne), Kingsale (1344, feudal barony 1223), Baron Louth (second creation, 1541), and Dunboyne (1541, feudal barony 1324). The current holder of the title is Randal Plunkett, born 1983.

== History ==
The first Baron of Dunsany was Sir Christopher Plunkett, second son of Christopher Plunkett, 1st Baron Killeen. The elder Christopher married Joan Cusack, heiress of Killeen and Dunsany, and passed Killeen to his eldest son and Dunsany to the second. The date at which Christopher Plunkett became a peer, and a hereditary member of the Irish Parliament, is uncertain. Debrett's listed the date of creation of the peerage as 1439, confirmed by Letters Patent in 1461, while Cokayne's Complete Peerage states that there is no record of a Dunsany as a peer before 1489, and that the creation may well have been as late as 1462, the year Sir Christopher died.

The third Baron was a founder member of the military order known as the Brotherhood of Saint George and supported the claims of the pretender Lambert Simnel to the English Crown. The fourth Baron was a soldier of some repute who was killed trying to put down a rising in 1521. His son, the fifth Baron, was a soldier and statesman who was accused of complicity in the rebellion of Silken Thomas.

The eleventh Baron was a follower of King James II, who was outlawed after the Glorious Revolution. He was restored to his estates after the Treaty of Limerick, but neglected the necessary measures needed to have himself recognised as the holder of the peerage, and, as such, was not summoned to further Parliaments. The twelfth Baron conformed to the Church of Ireland to preserve the lands of both Dunsany and Killeen, but did not take the necessary steps to confirm his right to the title and to the seat in the Irish House of Lords it would bestow.

The thirteenth Baron, son of the twelfth, did go through the necessary procedures to have his title and claim to a seat in the former Irish upper house properly admitted, and thus sat in the House of Lords as a peer of proven right. He was succeeded by his son, the fourteenth Baron, who served as Lord Lieutenant of County Meath, and also sat in the House of Lords as an Irish representative peer from 1836 to 1848.

The fifteenth Baron represented Drogheda in the House of Commons and was an Irish Representative Peer from 1850 to 1852. He was succeeded by his younger brother, the sixteenth Baron. The latter was an admiral in the Royal Navy, and also served as an Irish Representative Peer between 1864 and 1889. The seventeenth Baron, son of the sixteenth, sat as a Conservative Member of Parliament for Gloucestershire South and was an Irish Representative Peer from 1893 to 1899. His brother, Horace Plunkett was a key figure in the development of Irish agriculture and the Irish cooperative movement.

The seventeenth Baron was succeeded by his son, the eighteenth Baron. He was a well-known poet, playwright and author of short stories and novels, best known now for his short stories in the field of fantasy, the Jorkens stories, and his novel The King of Elfland's Daughter. The descendants of his younger brother, Reginald Drax, bear not only the Dunsany's surname Plunkett, but also other surnames inherited from their mother, Ernle Elizabeth Louisa Maria Grosvenor Ernle-Erle-Drax, née Ernle Elizabeth Louisa Maria Grosvenor Burton (1855–1916), giving them a rare quadruple-barrelled surname of Plunkett-Ernle-Erle-Drax.

The nineteenth Baron was a career soldier, primarily in the British Indian Army, while the twentieth, the painter and sculptor Edward Plunkett, 20th Baron of Dunsany, was the first Roman Catholic holder of the title since the 12th Baron. As of 2013, the title is held by the eighteenth Baron's great-grandson, Randal Plunkett, 21st Baron of Dunsany, who in 2011, succeeded his father; as of 2022, he has one daughter.

== Seat ==
The ancestral seat of this branch of the Plunkett family is Dunsany Castle in County Meath in Ireland.

== Style ==
The title is listed in Burke's Peerage and Baronetage and Debrett's Peerage and Baronetage as Baron of Dunsany, but in The Complete Peerage as Baron Dunsany without the of. In either case, the holder of the title is called Lord Dunsany in all but the most formal contexts.

== Barons of Dunsany (1439) ==
- Christopher Plunkett, 1st Baron of Dunsany (1410–1463)
- Richard Plunkett, 2nd Baron of Dunsany (died c. 1480)
- John Plunkett, 3rd Baron of Dunsany (died 1500)
- Edward Plunkett, 4th Baron of Dunsany (died 1521)
- Robert Plunkett, 5th Baron of Dunsany (died 1559)
- Christopher Plunkett, 6th Baron of Dunsany (died 1564)
- Patrick Plunkett, 7th Baron of Dunsany (died 1601)
- Christopher Plunkett, 8th Baron of Dunsany (died 1603)
- Patrick Plunkett, 9th Baron of Dunsany (1595–1668)
- Christopher Plunkett, 10th Baron of Dunsany (died 1690)
- Randall Plunkett, 11th Baron of Dunsany (died 1735)
- Edward Plunkett, 12th Baron of Dunsany (1713–1781)
- Randall Plunkett, 13th Baron of Dunsany (1739–1821)
- Edward Wadding Plunkett, 14th Baron of Dunsany (1773–1848)
- Randall Edward Plunkett, 15th Baron of Dunsany (1804–1852)
- Edward Plunkett, 16th Baron of Dunsany (1808–1889)
- John William Plunkett, 17th Baron of Dunsany (1853–1899)
- Edward John Moreton Drax Plunkett, 18th Baron of Dunsany (1878–1957)
- Randal Arthur Henry Plunkett, 19th Baron of Dunsany (1906–1999)
- Edward John Carlos Plunkett, 20th Baron of Dunsany (1939–2011)
- Randal Plunkett, 21st Baron of Dunsany (born 1983)

As the title descends in the male line only, as noted by the current holder, the heir presumptive is the holder's brother, the Hon. Oliver Plunkett (born 1985).

== Arms ==
Coat of arms of Baron of Dunsany
Crest A horse passant Argent. Escutcheon Sable a bend Argent, in sinister chief a tower triple towered of the last. Supporters Dexter a pegasus per fess Or and Argent sinister an antelope Argent armed unguled plain collared and chained Or. Motto Festina Lente

== See also ==
- Earl of Fingall (and Baron of Killeen)
- Plunkett Foundation
