= Randal Plunkett, 19th Baron of Dunsany =

Irish peer and landowner

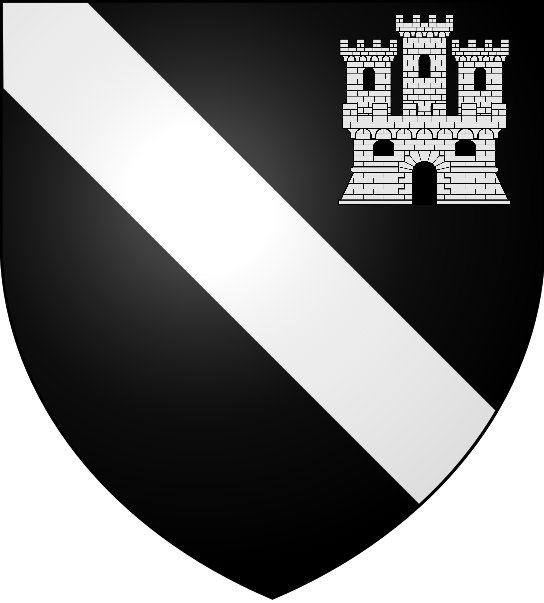
Arms of Lord Dunsany

Randal Arthur Henry Plunkett, 19th Baron of Dunsany (25 August 1906 – 8 February 1999), was an Irish peer and landowner, officer in the British and Indian Armies, and founder of the Irish branch of a knightly order. An only child, he was the son of author and playwright Edward, 18th Baron of Dunsany, and Lady Beatrice Child Villiers, daughter of the 7th Earl of Jersey.

== Family background and seat ==
The family seat of the Lords Dunsany is at Dunsany Castle, Dunsany, County Meath, Ireland. The original Dunsany and nearby Killeen Castles were built by Geoffrey de Cusack who was a tenant of Sir Hugh de Lacy, an early Cambro-Norman who arrived in Ireland with Strongbow, sometime between his arrival in Ireland in 1172 and the year 1181. Sir Hugh was given most of County Meath. The Plunketts of Dunsany and Killeen are descended from Geoffrey de Cusack and Matilda (née le Petit sister of William le Petit of Dunboyne Castle). The castle was built on an area of land believed to have been the site of an earlier Dún or fort, which may give its name to the locality. Both castles came to the Plunkett family through the marriage in the early 15th century of Sir Christopher Plunkett (Deputy Governor of Ireland in 1432) to Lady Joan de Cusack. It is claimed that the castle is the longest-occupied home and one of the oldest surviving continuously inhabited buildings in Ireland.

== Early life ==
Randal Plunkett was born in Dublin on 25 August 1906 and was educated at Eton College, Eton, Berkshire, England. In 1957 he succeeded to the family title on the death of his father the 18th Lord Dunsany.

== Army career ==
Plunkett joined the British Army in 1926, with the 16th/5th Lancers. He made a transfer to the British Indian Army some years later, and over a career of nearly 20 years served in the Guides Cavalry and the Indian Armoured Corps. He fought on the North-West Frontier in 1930 in the Guides Cavalry regiment of the British Indian Army, and was decorated for this service, and promoted to the rank of lieutenant-colonel. He also served on the North West Frontier during World War II, and in the summer of 1941 led a squadron by the Khojak Pass in what is now Pakistan. He was also deployed to Central Asia, working to preempt southward advances by German forces. He was later redeployed to northern Africa, to the Western Desert theatre, fighting at El Alamein. He retired from military service in 1947, the year the British Indian Army was stood down, having been decorated (Medal and Clasp).

== Personal life ==
On 23 August 1938 Plunkett married Vera de Sá Sottomaior (1910–1986), the youngest daughter of Dr. Genésio de Sá Sottomaior of São Paulo, Brazil and Julieta de Sampaio Quentel, and formerly wife of Ivar Bryce. Just over one year later the couple had their only child Edward John Carlos Plunkett, who would later succeed his father as 20th Lord Dunsany in 1999. However, the couple were divorced in 1947 and on 8 October 1947, Randal Plunkett married Sheila Victoria Katrin Philipps (1912–1999), daughter of Sir Henry Philipps, 2nd Baronet, of Picton Castle in Pembroke. From this marriage, Beatrice Mary Plunkett was born on 15 July 1948.

Plunkett was an active player of polo while in the army, and was later Master of the Hunt for the Tara Harriers. He assumed management of Dunsany Castle and Demesne after leaving the army, with his father retiring to Kent. He and his wife stayed annually with Henry McIlhenny at Glenveagh in County Donegal, where he stalked deer and fished.

Randal Dunsany died in 1999 after a long illness. He was buried on one of the mounds in front of Dunsany Castle. He was survived by both of his children. He had two grandchildren by Edward and Maria Alice Plunkett, both boys, to whom he left a personal bequest, while Beatrice Plunkett (styled "The Hon."), based in London and Wales, did not marry.

== Achievements ==
Dunsany led the establishment of the Military and Hospitaller Order of St. Lazarus of Jerusalem in Ireland. On 21 September 1962 the official inauguration of the Military and Hospitaller Order of St. Lazarus of Jerusalem Bailiwick (later to be Grand Priory) of Ireland took place at Dunsany Castle and Dunsany was invested as the first Chancellor of the order in Ireland. Dunsany and his wife funded the decoration of the Chapel of St Stephen at St Patrick's Cathedral, Dublin as the order's chapel in Ireland.

Peerage of Ireland
Preceded by Edward Plunkett	Baron of Dunsany; 1957–1999	Succeeded by Edward Plunkett
