= Dunsany Castle and Demesne =

Castle in County Meath, Ireland

Coordinates: 53°32′08″N 06°37′15″W

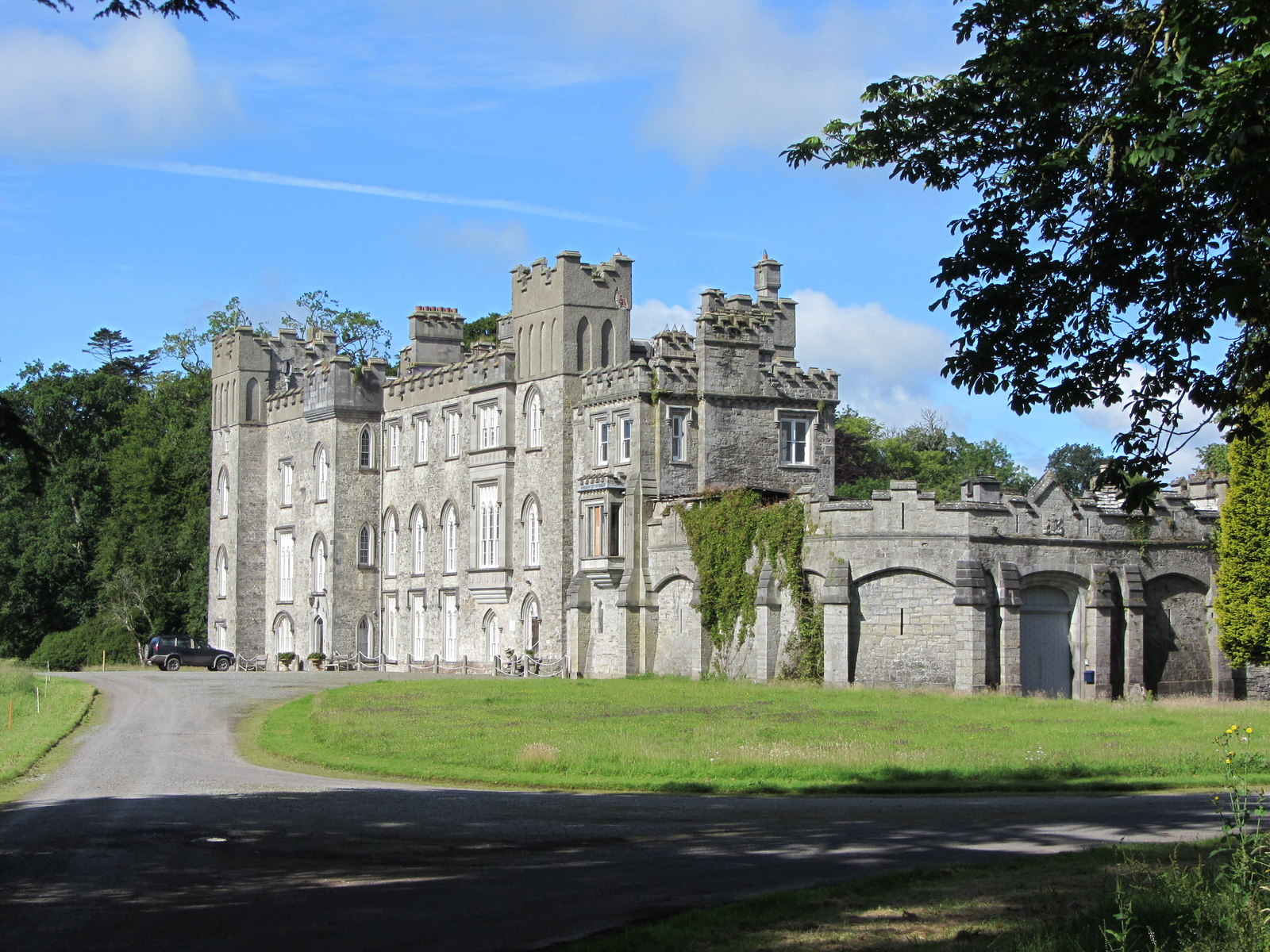
Frontage of Dunsany Castle

Dunsany Castle (Irish: Caisleán Dhún Samhnaí) is a modernised Anglo-Norman castle in County Meath, Ireland, notable as one of Ireland's oldest homes in continuous occupation, possibly the longest occupied by a single lineage, having been held by the Cusack family and their descendants by marriage, the Plunketts, from the 12th century to the present day. Figures associated with the castle include one of the originators of the fantasy genre, Lord Dunsany and the founder of the agricultural cooperative movement in Ireland, Horace Plunkett.

Construction of the castle was started c. 1180 by Hugh de Lacy, who also commissioned the original Killeen Castle, nearby, and the famous Trim Castle. The castle is surrounded by its demesne, the inner part of the formerly extensive Dunsany Estate. The demesne holds a historic church dedicated to Saint Nicholas, a walled garden, a stone farm complex, and an ice house, among other features, and is home to a wide range of trees and fauna. It is today the subject of a large-scale rewilding project.

== Location ==
Dunsany Castle and demesne, and other remnants of the family estates, are situated in and near the townland of Dunsany, County Meath, between the historic town of Trim and Dunshaughlin. At nearby Dunsany Cross is a hamlet, with a post office store, Catholic church and primary school, a GAA pitch with a clubhouse and bar and a mix of private housing with a small local authority development. The former Dower House is located just east of the hamlet. The demesne can be reached from the N3 road and from Trim, and is signposted from the Navan Road, from Dunshaughlin and from Warrenstown, near the former railway station for the area, at Drumree. The next village is Kilmessan, and today Dunsany and Kilmessan together form a single Catholic parish.

== History ==
=== Background ===
To the left and right of the front of the current castle are two mounds, believed to be artificial constructions, at least one (to the east) possibly part of an earlier Irish fortification, which would explain the name of the district – Dunsany is Dún Samhain or Dún Samhnai in Irish, and a dún is a fort. It is believed that the eastern, or both of these, were later used as early Anglo-Norman points of defence, possibly on the motte and bailey style. The western one, with a formation sometimes likened to two dunes, was memorialised by Oliver St John Gogarty. There is a third mound further to the west also.

=== Castle origins ===
Dunsany Castle began with four stone towers, with walls between and a yard inside, in the late 12th century, construction being thought to have begun in 1180 on the orders of Hugh de Lacy. Foundations and the lower parts of the four main towers are likely original, and some interior spaces, notably an old kitchen, but much additional work has been carried out, especially in the 18th and 19th centuries, and the current castle is more than three times the size of the original.

The castle, along with Killeen Castle, was held by the Cusacks, initially on behalf of the de Lacys, and passed by marriage in the early 15th century to the Plunketts. Originally, it and Killeen lay on a single estate but the first generation of Plunketts gave Killeen to the eldest son, and Dunsany to the younger, Christopher, following which the estate was divided, and the Castle descended in the hands of the Barons of Dunsany, who enjoyed almost uninterrupted ownership and control, aside from issues around Oliver Cromwell's operations in Ireland (the then Lady Dunsany defended the castle against an initial approach but the family were later forced out in 1649, some dying on the way to Connaught), and the aftermath of some other troubles between Ireland and England. They were cousins of Saint Oliver Plunkett.

=== 19th century onwards ===
The Dunsany Estate was reduced by the operation of the Land Acts in the late 19th and early 20th century but the castle remained surrounded by its original demesne, and other estate lands remain around the district, some adjacent to the demesne and some remote.

Much of the work of the writer Lord Dunsany was done at the Castle, notably in a room in one of the building's towers. The author commissioned a two-storey extension to one side of the rear of the castle in 1910. Designed by George Jack from the office of William Morris, it was built in an Arts and Crafts style by 1914 and contains a spacious billiard room, two bedrooms, and other facilities.

The castle was the scene for an early fashion show by Sybil Connolly, in 1953, which was featured on the cover of Life magazine. The dower house and its lands were sold in the latter half of the 20th century. Since the 1990s, work has been carried out to restore parts of the castle, and some of the Dunsany properties in the demesne, the hamlet at Dunsany crossroads, and in Trim.

The family's other castle, the largest in Ireland but a ruin, Trim Castle, was transferred to the State in 1993, such a transfer having been refused in the late 19th century. The 19th Lord Dunsany is buried on one of mounds in front of the line of the castle. As of 2020, the Castle was owned and lived in by Randal Plunkett, 21st Baron of Dunsany.

== Castle structure ==
The castle is entered through an outer lobby and then an inner lobby with a worked plaster ceiling, both of which contain military memorabilia. Beyond are the central hallway, featuring the principal stairway and a vaulted ceiling, and a more private secondary hall. The ground floor holds the grand dining room, with portraits of past family members, the former estate office, and a fine arts and crafts billiards room. Also present in the historic castle core, off a spinal corridor ("the passage"), are the ancient kitchen and a more modern one, a bedroom suite, and other rooms. The corridor in turn connects to buildings on the castle's internal yard, with living spaces and the gallery of the 20th Baron of Dunsany, the late artist also known as Eddie Plunkett or Eddie Dunsany.

On the first floor of the historic castle are the library, and drawing-room, which has Stapleton plasterwork from 1780. The library, which may have been worked on by James Shiel, is in the "Gothic Revival" style, with a "beehive" ceiling. Also on this floor is a secondary stairway (where a "priest's hole" for hiding Catholic priests formerly existed). The third floor holds ornate bedrooms, some with attached bathrooms, and the principal one also with a dressing room. One of the bedrooms is reputedly haunted.

== Demesne ==
=== Walls, entrances and lodges ===
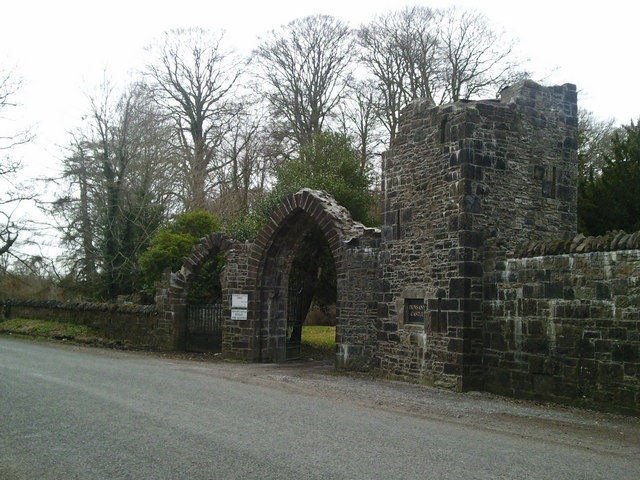
Dunsany Castle entrance. Across from the pilgrim cross.

The demesne is surrounded by a drystone wall, much of which was built during the Great Famine as a relief work. The wall is interrupted by two formal entrances, on the Dublin Road, a farm entrance on the same road, and a closed entrance near the former railway line and the Skane River, on the Glane Road.

The former main gateway, nearest to Dunshaughlin, leads to a long avenue, which abruptly reveals the castle to arrivals. Built in its current form around 1830, it is in the neo-Gothic style, with a tower lodge, mock porticullis, and two sets of white gates, for a carriage entrance and a footpath. It displays the coat of arms of the 14th Lord Dunsany, quartered with those of his two wives. It is disused since around 1960, and its carriageway is grown-over. The main entrance to the grounds today, opposite a medieval pilgrim cross near Dunsany crossroads, has the appearance of a Gothic ruin but is a sham. It conceals a residential gatehouse lodge, and was originally built for arrivals smaller than carriages, such as horse-buggies and carts, and riding parties. Just inside this gate is the former Steward's House, a sunken stone-built structure, and just to the west on the public road is an access road for the demesne farm.

A third gateway, at Dunsany Bridge, over the River Skane, had a lodge made of black limestone, the Black Lodge, which was vandalised in the 1980s. It displayed the coat of arms of the 14th Lord Dunsany and may have been the work of James Shiel. The road facing it is said to be haunted by a headless horseman at night.

=== Church of St Nicholas ("The Abbey") ===
The Church of St Nicholas (of Myra), known locally as the Abbey, was built in the 1440s on the site of an earlier church (standing in 1305). It is now a National Monument, with remnants of lofts and living quarters, and inside and around are tombs of family members and local residents, including the 20th Lord Dunsany. It fell out of use, perhaps damaged by Cromwellian forces, and a new church was built at Dunsany Crossroads, but it is still consecrated. It was partly restored for the filming of the wedding scene from the film Braveheart in 1994, and a wedding Mass was celebrated there (with a temporary roof installed) in the early 2000s, with the Bishop of Meath. A feature of the church was a highly-decorated font.

=== Walled garden ===
There is a walled garden, around 3.4 acres (1.4 ha) in size, which as of 2000, still produced fruit and vegetables for the estate. A cottage, historically occupied by the senior gardener, is built into the walls of the garden. Nearby are working beehives.

=== Other structures ===
Also within the demesne are stone-built farm and stable yards, an ice-house and wells. There is a home within the stable yard. There is also at least one ruined cottage near the walls.

In front of the castle is a lawn and a ha-ha protective ditch, beyond which estate farmland begins. Passing under one of the roads is a sunken path by which staff could discreetly move from the walled farmyard complex to some of the fields.

=== Lands and watercourses ===
The lands contain a mix of farmland, marsh and mature mixed woodland; a flower garden also existed until 1950. As of 2021, parts are in the process of being rewilded by the 21st Lord Dunsany, Randal Plunkett. The lands are home to a range of wildlife, including, as of 2000, owls, pheasants, sparrowhawks, kestrels, herons, moorhens and jays, as well as rabbits and hares, foxes and badgers, squirrels, deer and otters.

Six stretches of woodland and many of the demesne fields have historically established names.

The River Skane runs through the woodland, in a stretch called the Railway Wood, alongside the old Dublin-Navan railway line. It is a tributary of the River Boyne and did contain fish in the past. It is joined near the Glane Road by the small River Gansey or Ganzey, from Killeen and Corballis, which crosses through Dunsany lands.

== Access ==
The grounds are private and access normally requires prior arrangement. The castle can be visited on a certain number of days each year, by way of a guided tour, for a fee. Tours around the nature reserve with small groups are possible as of 2021, though places are very limited.

== Popular culture ==
The castle and demesne have been used for filming on occasions, for example for Braveheart (the wedding scene was filmed in the Church of St Nicholas, for example) and the remake of The Magnificent Ambersons.
