= List of peers 1570–1579 =

This page lists all peers who held extant titles between 1570 and 1579.

== Peerage of England ==
Title	Holder	Date gained	Date lost	Notes
Duke of Cornwall (1337)	none	1537	1603	
Duke of Norfolk (1483)	Thomas Howard, 4th Duke of Norfolk	1554	1572	Attainted, and his honours were forfeited
Marquess of Northampton (1547)	William Parr, 1st Marquess of Northampton	1547	1571	Died, title extinct
Marquess of Winchester (1551)	William Paulet, 1st Marquess of Winchester	1551	1572	Died
Marquess of Winchester (1551)	John Paulet, 2nd Marquess of Winchester	1572	1576	Died
Marquess of Winchester (1551)	William Paulet, 3rd Marquess of Winchester	1576	1598	
Earl of Arundel (1138)	Henry FitzAlan, 19th Earl of Arundel	1544	1580	
Earl of Oxford (1142)	Edward de Vere, 17th Earl of Oxford	1562	1604	
Earl of Westmorland (1397)	Charles Neville, 6th Earl of Westmorland	1564	1571	Attainted
Earl of Shrewsbury (1442)	George Talbot, 6th Earl of Shrewsbury	1560	1590	
Earl of Kent (1465)	Reginald Grey, 5th Earl of Kent	1562	1573	Died
Earl of Kent (1465)	Henry Grey, 6th Earl of Kent	1573	1615	
Earl of Derby (1485)	Edward Stanley, 3rd Earl of Derby	1521	1572	Died
Earl of Derby (1485)	Henry Stanley, 4th Earl of Derby	1572	1593	
Earl of Worcester (1514)	William Somerset, 3rd Earl of Worcester	1549	1589	
Earl of Cumberland (1525)	Henry Clifford, 2nd Earl of Cumberland	1542	1570	Died
Earl of Cumberland (1525)	George Clifford, 3rd Earl of Cumberland	1570	1605	
Earl of Rutland (1525)	Edward Manners, 3rd Earl of Rutland	1563	1587	
Earl of Huntingdon (1529)	Henry Hastings, 3rd Earl of Huntingdon	1561	1595	
Earl of Sussex (1529)	Thomas Radclyffe, 3rd Earl of Sussex	1557	1583	
Earl of Bath (1536)	William Bourchier, 3rd Earl of Bath	1561	1623	
Earl of Southampton (1547)	Henry Wriothesley, 2nd Earl of Southampton	1550	1581	
Earl of Bedford (1550)	Francis Russell, 2nd Earl of Bedford	1555	1585	
Earl of Pembroke (1551)	William Herbert, 1st Earl of Pembroke	1551	1570	Died
Earl of Pembroke (1551)	Henry Herbert, 2nd Earl of Pembroke	1570	1601	
Earl of Devon (1553)	William Courtenay, de jure 3rd Earl of Devon	1557	1630	
Earl of Northumberland (1557)	Thomas Percy, 7th Earl of Northumberland	1557	1572	Died
Earl of Northumberland (1557)	Henry Percy, 8th Earl of Northumberland	1572	1585	
Earl of Hertford (1559)	Edward Seymour, 1st Earl of Hertford	1559	1621	
Earl of Warwick (1561)	Ambrose Dudley, 1st Earl of Warwick	1561	1590	
Earl of Leicester (1564)	Robert Dudley, 1st Earl of Leicester	1564	1588	
Earl of Essex (1572)	Walter Devereux, 1st Earl of Essex	1572	1576	New creation; died
Earl of Essex (1572)	Robert Devereux, 2nd Earl of Essex	1576	1601	
Earl of Lincoln (1572)	Edward Clinton, 1st Earl of Lincoln	1572	1585	New creation
Viscount Hereford (1550)	Walter Devereux, 2nd Viscount Hereford	1558	1576	Created Earl of Essex, see above
Viscount Montagu (1554)	Anthony Browne, 1st Viscount Montagu	1554	1592	
Viscount Howard of Bindon (1559)	Thomas Howard, 1st Viscount Howard of Bindon	1559	1582	
Baron Grey de Wilton (1295)	Arthur Grey, 14th Baron Grey de Wilton	1562	1593	
Baron Clinton (1299)	Edward Clinton, 9th Baron Clinton	1517	1585	Created Earl of Lincoln, Barony held by his heirs until 1692, when it fell into abeyance
Baron Morley (1299)	Henry Parker, 11th Baron Morley	1556	1577	Died
Baron Morley (1299)	Edward Parker, 12th Baron Morley	1577	1618	
Baron Zouche of Haryngworth (1308)	Edward la Zouche, 11th Baron Zouche	1569	1625	
Baron Audley of Heleigh (1313)	George Tuchet, 11th Baron Audley	1563	1617	
Baron Cobham of Kent (1313)	William Brooke, 10th Baron Cobham	1558	1597	
Baron Willoughby de Eresby (1313)	Catherine Willoughby, 12th Baroness Willoughby de Eresby	1526	1580	
Baron Dacre (1321)	Gregory Fiennes, 10th Baron Dacre	1558	1594	
Baron Bourchier (1342)	Anne Bourchier, 7th Baroness Bourchier	1540	1571	Died, Barony succeeded by the Earl of Essex, and held by his heirs until 1646, when it fell into abeyance
Baron Scrope of Bolton (1371)	Henry Scrope, 9th Baron Scrope of Bolton	1549	1591	
Baron Bergavenny (1392)	Henry Nevill, 6th Baron Bergavenny	1536	1585	
Baron Berkeley (1421)	Henry Berkeley, 7th Baron Berkeley	1534	1613	
Baron Latimer (1432)	John Neville, 4th Baron Latimer	1543	1577	Died, Barony fell into abeyance, until 1913
Baron Dudley (1440)	Edward Sutton, 4th Baron Dudley	1553	1586	
Baron Saye and Sele (1447)	Richard Fiennes, 6th Baron Saye and Sele	1528	1573	Died
Baron Saye and Sele (1447)	Richard Fiennes, 7th Baron Saye and Sele	1573	1613	
Baron Stourton (1448)	John Stourton, 9th Baron Stourton	1557	1588	
Baron Ogle (1461)	Cuthbert Ogle, 7th Baron Ogle	1562	1597	
Baron Mountjoy (1465)	James Blount, 6th Baron Mountjoy	1544	1582	
Baron Willoughby de Broke (1491)	Fulke Greville, 4th Baron Willoughby de Broke	1562	1606	
Baron Monteagle (1514)	William Stanley, 3rd Baron Monteagle	1560	1581	
Baron Vaux of Harrowden (1523)	William Vaux, 3rd Baron Vaux of Harrowden	1556	1595	
Baron Sandys of the Vine (1529)	William Sandys, 3rd Baron Sandys	1560	1623	
Baron Burgh (1529)	William Burgh, 2nd Baron Burgh	1550	1584	
Baron Windsor (1529)	Edward Windsor, 3rd Baron Windsor	1558	1574	Died
Baron Windsor (1529)	Frederick Windsor, 4th Baron Windsor	1574	1585	
Baron Wentworth (1529)	Thomas Wentworth, 2nd Baron Wentworth	1551	1584	
Baron Mordaunt (1532)	John Mordaunt, 2nd Baron Mordaunt	1562	1571	Died
Baron Mordaunt (1532)	Lewis Mordaunt, 3rd Baron Mordaunt	1571	1601	
Baron Cromwell (1540)	Henry Cromwell, 2nd Baron Cromwell	1551	1593	
Baron Eure (1544)	William Eure, 2nd Baron Eure	1548	1594	
Baron Wharton (1545)	Thomas Wharton, 2nd Baron Wharton	1568	1572	Died
Baron Wharton (1545)	Philip Wharton, 3rd Baron Wharton	1572	1625	
Baron Sheffield (1547)	Edmund Sheffield, 3rd Baron Sheffield	1568	1646	
Baron Rich (1547)	Robert Rich, 2nd Baron Rich	1567	1581	
Baron Willoughby of Parham (1547)	William Willoughby, 1st Baron Willoughby of Parham	1547	1570	Died
Baron Willoughby of Parham (1547)	Charles Willoughby, 2nd Baron Willoughby of Parham	1570	1612	
Baron Lumley (1547)	John Lumley, 1st Baron Lumley	1547	1609	
Baron Darcy of Aston (1548)	John Darcy, 2nd Baron Darcy of Aston	1558	1602	
Baron Darcy of Chiche (1551)	John Darcy, 2nd Baron Darcy of Chiche	1558	1581	
Baron Paget (1552)	Thomas Paget, 3rd Baron Paget	1563	1589	
Baron North (1554)	Roger North, 2nd Baron North	1564	1600	
Baron Howard of Effingham (1554)	William Howard, 1st Baron Howard of Effingham	1554	1573	Died
Baron Howard of Effingham (1554)	Charles Howard, 2nd Baron Howard of Effingham	1573	1624	
Baron Chandos (1554)	Edmund Brydges, 2nd Baron Chandos	1557	1573	Died
Baron Chandos (1554)	Giles Brydges, 3rd Baron Chandos	1573	1594	
Baron Hastings of Loughborough (1558)	Edward Hastings, 1st Baron Hastings of Loughborough	1558	1572	Died, title extinct
Baron Hunsdon (1559)	Henry Carey, 1st Baron Hunsdon	1559	1596	
Baron St John of Bletso (1559)	Oliver St John, 1st Baron St John of Bletso	1559	1582	
Baron Buckhurst (1567)	Thomas Sackville, 1st Baron Buckhurst	1567	1608	
Baron De La Warr (1570)	William West, 1st Baron De La Warr	1570	1595	New creation
Baron Burghley (1571)	William Cecil, 1st Baron Burghley	1571	1598	New creation
Baron Cheyne of Toddington (1572)	Henry Cheyne, 1st Baron Cheyne	1572	1587	New creation
Baron Compton (1572)	Henry Compton, 1st Baron Compton	1572	1589	New creation
Baron Norreys (1572)	Henry Norris, 1st Baron Norreys	1572	1601	New creation

== Peerage of Scotland ==
Title	Holder	Date gained	Date lost	Notes
Duke of Rothesay (1398)	none	1567	1594	
Earl of Mar (1114)	John Erskine, 18th/1st Earl of Mar	1565	1572	Died
Earl of Mar (1114)	John Erskine, 19th/2nd Earl of Mar	1572	1634	
Earl of Sutherland (1235)	Alexander Gordon, 12th Earl of Sutherland	1567	1594	
Earl of Angus (1389)	Archibald Douglas, 8th Earl of Angus	1558	1588	
Earl of Crawford (1398)	David Lindsay, 10th Earl of Crawford	1558	1574	Died
Earl of Crawford (1398)	David Lindsay, 11th Earl of Crawford	1574	1607	
Earl of Menteith (1427)	William Graham, 5th Earl of Menteith	1565	1578	Died
Earl of Menteith (1427)	John Graham, 6th Earl of Menteith	1578	1598	
Earl of Huntly (1445)	George Gordon, 5th Earl of Huntly	1565	1579	Died
Earl of Huntly (1445)	George Gordon, 6th Earl of Huntly	1579	1636	
Earl of Erroll (1452)	George Hay, 7th Earl of Erroll	1541	1573	Died
Earl of Erroll (1452)	Andrew Hay, 8th Earl of Erroll	1573	1585	
Earl of Caithness (1455)	George Sinclair, 4th Earl of Caithness	1529	1582	
Earl of Argyll (1457)	Archibald Campbell, 5th Earl of Argyll	1558	1573	Died
Earl of Argyll (1457)	Colin Campbell, 6th Earl of Argyll	1573	1584	
Earl of Atholl (1457)	John Stewart, 4th Earl of Atholl	1542	1579	Died
Earl of Atholl (1457)	John Stewart, 5th Earl of Atholl	1579	1595	
Earl of Morton (1458)	James Douglas, 4th Earl of Morton	1550	1581	
Earl of Rothes (1458)	Andrew Leslie, 5th Earl of Rothes	1558	1611	
Earl Marischal (1458)	William Keith, 4th Earl Marischal	1530	1581	
Earl of Buchan (1469)	Christina Stewart, 4th Countess of Buchan	1551	1580	
Earl of Glencairn (1488)	Alexander Cunningham, 5th Earl of Glencairn	1541	1574	Died
Earl of Glencairn (1488)	William Cunningham, 6th Earl of Glencairn	1574	1578	
Earl of Glencairn (1488)	James Cunningham, 7th Earl of Glencairn	1578	1630	
Earl of Lennox (1488)	Matthew Stewart, 4th Earl of Lennox	1526	1571	Died, title merged in the Crown
Earl of Arran (1503)	James Hamilton, 2nd Earl of Arran	1529	1575	Died
Earl of Arran (1503)	James Hamilton, 3rd Earl of Arran	1575	1609	
Earl of Montrose (1503)	William Graham, 2nd Earl of Montrose	1513	1571	Died
Earl of Montrose (1503)	John Graham, 3rd Earl of Montrose	1571	1608	
Earl of Eglinton (1507)	Hugh Montgomerie, 3rd Earl of Eglinton	1546	1585	
Earl of Cassilis (1509)	Gilbert Kennedy, 4th Earl of Cassilis	1558	1576	Died
Earl of Cassilis (1509)	John Kennedy, 5th Earl of Cassilis	1576	1615	
Earl of Moray (1562)	James Stewart, 1st Earl of Moray	1562	1570	Died
Earl of Moray (1562)	Elizabeth Stuart, 2nd Countess of Moray	1570	1591	
Earl of Lennox (1572)	Charles Stuart, 1st Earl of Lennox	1572	1576	New creation; died, title extinct
Earl of Lennox (1578)	Robert Stewart, 1st Earl of Lennox	1578	1580	New creation
Lord Somerville (1430)	Hugh Somerville, 7th Lord Somerville	1569	1597	
Lord Forbes (1442)	William Forbes, 7th Lord Forbes	1547	1593	
Lord Maxwell (1445)	John Maxwell, 8th Lord Maxwell	1555	1593	
Lord Glamis (1445)	John Lyon, 8th Lord Glamis	1558	1578	Died
Lord Glamis (1445)	Patrick Lyon, 9th Lord Glamis	1578	1615	
Lord Lindsay of the Byres (1445)	Patrick Lindsay, 6th Lord Lindsay	1563	1589	
Lord Saltoun (1445)	Alexander Abernethy, 6th Lord Saltoun	1543	1587	
Lord Gray (1445)	Patrick Gray, 4th Lord Gray	1541	1584	
Lord Sinclair (1449)	William Sinclair, 4th Lord Sinclair	1513	1570	Died
Lord Sinclair (1449)	Henry Sinclair, 5th Lord Sinclair	1570	1601	
Lord Fleming (1451)	John Fleming, 5th Lord Fleming	1558	1572	Died
Lord Fleming (1451)	John Fleming, 6th Lord Fleming	1572	1619	
Lord Seton (1451)	George Seton, 7th Lord Seton	1549	1586	
Lord Borthwick (1452)	William Borthwick, 6th Lord Borthwick	1566	1582	
Lord Boyd (1454)	Robert Boyd, 5th Lord Boyd	1558	1590	
Lord Oliphant (1455)	Laurence Oliphant, 4th Lord Oliphant	1566	1593	
Lord Livingston (1458)	William Livingstone, 6th Lord Livingston	1553	1592	
Lord Cathcart (1460)	Alan Cathcart, 4th Lord Cathcart	1547	1618	
Lord Lovat (1464)	Hugh Fraser, 5th Lord Lovat	1558	1577	Died
Lord Lovat (1464)	Simon Fraser, 6th Lord Lovat	1577	1633	
Lord Innermeath (1470)	James Stewart, 5th Lord Innermeath	1569	1585	
Lord Carlyle of Torthorwald (1473)	Michael Carlyle, 4th Lord Carlyle	1526	1575	Died
Lord Carlyle of Torthorwald (1473)	Elizabeth Douglas, 5th Lady Carlyle	1575	1605	
Lord Home (1473)	Alexander Home, 5th Lord Home	1549	1575	Died
Lord Home (1473)	Alexander Home, 6th Lord Home	1575	1619	
Lord Ruthven (1488)	William Ruthven, 4th Lord Ruthven	1566	1584	
Lord Crichton of Sanquhar (1488)	Robert Crichton, 8th Lord Crichton of Sanquhar	1569	1612	
Lord Drummond of Cargill (1488)	David Drummond, 2nd Lord Drummond	1519	1571	Died
Lord Drummond of Cargill (1488)	Patrick Drummond, 3rd Lord Drummond	1571	1600	
Lord Hay of Yester (1488)	William Hay, 5th Lord Hay of Yester	1557	1586	
Lord Sempill (1489)	Robert Sempill, 3rd Lord Sempill	1552	1576	Died
Lord Sempill (1489)	Robert Sempill, 4th Lord Sempill	1576	1611	
Lord Herries of Terregles (1490)	Agnes Maxwell, 4th Lady Herries of Terregles	1543	1594	
Lord Ogilvy of Airlie (1491)	James Ogilvy, 5th Lord Ogilvy of Airlie	1549	1606	
Lord Ross (1499)	James Ross, 4th Lord Ross	1556	1581	
Lord Elphinstone (1509)	Robert Elphinstone, 3rd Lord Elphinstone	1547	1602	
Lord Methven (1528)	Henry Stewart, 2nd Lord Methven	1552	1572	Died
Lord Methven (1528)	Henry Stewart, 3rd Lord Methven	1572	1580	
Lord Ochiltree (1543)	Andrew Stewart, 2nd Lord Ochiltree	1548	1591	
Lord Torphichen (1564)	James Sandilands, 1st Lord Torphichen	1564	1579	Died
Lord Torphichen (1564)	James Sandilands, 2nd Lord Torphichen	1579	1617	

== Peerage of Ireland ==
Title	Holder	Date gained	Date lost	Notes
Earl of Kildare (1316)	Gerald FitzGerald, 11th Earl of Kildare	1569	1585	
Earl of Ormond (1328)	Thomas Butler, 10th Earl of Ormond	1546	1614	
Earl of Desmond (1329)	Gerald FitzGerald, 15th Earl of Desmond	1558	1582	
Earl of Waterford (1446)	George Talbot, 6th Earl of Waterford	1560	1590	
Earl of Tyrone (1542)	Hugh O'Neill, 3rd Earl of Tyrone	1562	1608	
Earl of Clanricarde (1543)	Richard Burke, 2nd Earl of Clanricarde	1544	1582	
Earl of Thomond (1543)	Connor O'Brien, 3rd Earl of Thomond	1553	1581	
Earl of Clancare (1565)	Donald McCarthy, 1st Earl of Clancare	1565	1597	
Viscount Gormanston (1478)	Christopher Preston, 4th Viscount Gormanston	1569	1599	
Viscount Buttevant (1541)	James de Barry, 4th Viscount Buttevant	1557	1581	
Viscount Baltinglass (1541)	Rowland Eustace, 2nd Viscount Baltinglass	1549	1578	Died
Viscount Baltinglass (1541)	James Eustace, 3rd Viscount Baltinglass	1578	1585	
Viscount Mountgarret (1550)	Richard Butler, 1st Viscount Mountgarret	1550	1571	Died
Viscount Mountgarret (1550)	Edmund Butler, 2nd Viscount Mountgarret	1571	1602	
Viscount Decies (1569)	Maurice Fitzgerald, 1st Viscount Decies	1569	1572	Died, title extinct
Baron Athenry (1172)	Richard II de Bermingham	1547	1580	
Baron Kingsale (1223)	Gerald de Courcy, 17th Baron Kingsale	1535	1599	
Baron Kerry (1223)	Thomas Fitzmaurice, 16th Baron Kerry	1550	1590	
Baron Slane (1370)	James Fleming, 9th Baron Slane	1517	1578	Died
Baron Slane (1370)	Thomas Fleming, 10th Baron Slane	1578	1597	
Baron Howth (1425)	Christopher St Lawrence, 8th Baron Howth	1558	1589	
Baron Killeen (1449)	James Plunkett, 8th Baron Killeen	1567	1595	
Baron Trimlestown (1461)	Robert Barnewall, 5th Baron Trimlestown	1562	1573	Died
Baron Trimlestown (1461)	Peter Barnewall, 6th Baron Trimlestown	1573	1598	
Baron Dunsany (1462)	Patrick Plunkett, 7th Baron of Dunsany	1564	1601	
Baron Delvin (1486)	Christopher Nugent, 6th Baron Delvin	1559	1602	
Baron Power (1535)	John Power, 3rd Baron Power	1545	1592	
Baron Dunboyne (1541)	James Butler, 2nd/12th Baron Dunboyne	1566	1624	
Baron Louth (1541)	Thomas Plunkett, 2nd Baron Louth	1555	1571	Died
Baron Louth (1541)	Patrick Plunkett, 3rd Baron Louth	1571	1575	Died
Baron Louth (1541)	Oliver Plunkett, 4th Baron Louth	1575	1607	
Baron Upper Ossory (1541)	Barnaby Fitzpatrick, 1st Baron Upper Ossory	1541	1575	Died
Baron Upper Ossory (1541)	Barnaby Fitzpatrick, 2nd Baron Upper Ossory	1575	1581	
Baron Inchiquin (1543)	Murrough McDermot O'Brien, 3rd Baron Inchiquin	1557	1573	Died
Baron Inchiquin (1543)	Murrough O'Brien, 4th Baron Inchiquin	1573	1597	

Preceded by List of peers 1560–1569	Lists of peers by decade 1570–1579	Succeeded by List of peers 1580–1589
