= List of peers 1550–1559 =

This page lists all peers who held extant titles between 1550 and 1559.

== Peerage of England ==
Title	Holder	Date gained	Date lost	Notes
Duke of Cornwall (1337)	none	1537	1603	
Duke of Norfolk (1483)	Thomas Howard, 3rd Duke of Norfolk	1553	1554	Restored; died
Duke of Norfolk (1483)	Thomas Howard, 4th Duke of Norfolk	1554	1572	
Duke of Suffolk (1514)	Henry Brandon, 2nd Duke of Suffolk	1545	1551	Died
Duke of Suffolk (1514)	Charles Brandon, 3rd Duke of Suffolk	1551	1551	Died, title extinct
Duke of Somerset (1547)	Edward Seymour, 1st Duke of Somerset	1514	1545	Attainted, and his titles were forfeited
Duke of Northumberland (1551)	John Dudley, 1st Duke of Northumberland	1551	1553	New creation; attainted and his honours were forfeited
Duke of Suffolk (1551)	Henry Grey, 1st Duke of Suffolk	1551	1554	New creation; also Marquess of Dorset; attainted and his honours were forfeited
Marquess of Northampton (1547)	William Parr, 1st Marquess of Northampton	1547	1571	Attainted 1554, restored 1559
Marquess of Winchester (1551)	William Paulet, 1st Marquess of Winchester	1551	1572	New creation; created Earl of Wiltshire in 1550
Earl of Arundel (1138)	Henry FitzAlan, 19th Earl of Arundel	1544	1580	
Earl of Oxford (1142)	John de Vere, 16th Earl of Oxford	1540	1562	
Earl of Westmorland (1397)	Henry Neville, 5th Earl of Westmorland	1459	1564	
Earl of Shrewsbury (1442)	Francis Talbot, 5th Earl of Shrewsbury	1538	1560	
Earl of Kent (1465)	Henry Grey, 4th Earl of Kent	1524	1562	
Earl of Derby (1485)	Edward Stanley, 3rd Earl of Derby	1521	1572	
Earl of Worcester (1514)	William Somerset, 3rd Earl of Worcester	1549	1589	
Earl of Cumberland (1525)	Henry Clifford, 2nd Earl of Cumberland	1542	1570	
Earl of Rutland (1525)	Henry Manners, 2nd Earl of Rutland	1543	1563	
Earl of Huntingdon (1529)	Francis Hastings, 2nd Earl of Huntingdon	1544	1561	
Earl of Sussex (1529)	Henry Radclyffe, 2nd Earl of Sussex	1542	1553	Died
Earl of Sussex (1529)	Thomas Radclyffe, 3rd Earl of Sussex	1557	1583	
Earl of Bath (1536)	John Bourchier, 2nd Earl of Bath	1539	1561	
Earl of Southampton (1547)	Thomas Wriothesley, 1st Earl of Southampton	1547	1550	Died
Earl of Southampton (1547)	Henry Wriothesley, 2nd Earl of Southampton	1550	1581	
Earl of Warwick (1547)	John Dudley, 1st Earl of Warwick	1547	1553	Created Duke of Northumberland in 1551, see above; attainted in 1553
Earl of Warwick (1547)	John Dudley, 2nd Earl of Warwick	1553	1553	Restored; died, title extinct
Earl of Bedford (1550)	John Russell, 1st Earl of Bedford	1550	1555	New creation, died
Earl of Bedford (1550)	Francis Russell, 2nd Earl of Bedford	1555	1585	
Earl of Pembroke (1551)	William Herbert, 1st Earl of Pembroke	1551	1570	New creation
Earl of Devon (1553)	Edward Courtenay, 1st Earl of Devon	1553	1556	New creation; on his death the title was considered extinct, until 1831
Earl of Devon (1553)	William Courtenay, de jure 2nd Earl of Devon	1556	1557	
Earl of Devon (1553)	William Courtenay, de jure 3rd Earl of Devon	1557	1630	
Earl of Northumberland (1557)	Thomas Percy, 7th Earl of Northumberland	1557	1572	New creation
Earl of Hertford (1557)	Edward Seymour, 1st Earl of Hertford	1559	1621	New creation
Viscount Hereford (1550)	Walter Devereux, 1st Viscount Hereford	1550	1558	New creation; died
Viscount Hereford (1550)	Walter Devereux, 2nd Viscount Hereford	1558	1576	
Viscount Montagu (1554)	Anthony Browne, 1st Viscount Montagu	1554	1592	New creation
Viscount Howard of Bindon (1559)	Thomas Howard, 1st Viscount Howard of Bindon	1559	1582	New creation
Baron Grey de Wilton (1295)	William Grey, 13th Baron Grey de Wilton	1520	1562	
Baron Clinton (1299)	Edward Clinton, 9th Baron Clinton	1517	1585	
Baron De La Warr (1299)	Thomas West, 9th Baron De La Warr	1525	1554	Died, Barony fell into abeyance
Baron Ferrers of Chartley (1299)	Walter Devereux, 10th Baron Ferrers of Chartley	1501	1558	Created Viscount Hereford, Barony held by his heirs until 1646, when it fell into abeyance
Baron Morley (1299)	Henry Parker, 10th Baron Morley	1518	1556	Died
Baron Morley (1299)	Henry Parker, 11th Baron Morley	1556	1577	
Baron Zouche of Haryngworth (1308)	John la Zouche, 8th Baron Zouche	1526	1550	Died
Baron Zouche of Haryngworth (1308)	Richard la Zouche, 9th Baron Zouche	1550	1552	Died
Baron Zouche of Haryngworth (1308)	George la Zouche, 10th Baron Zouche	1552	1569	
Baron Audley of Heleigh (1313)	John Tuchet, 8th Baron Audley	1512	1557	Died
Baron Audley of Heleigh (1313)	George Tuchet, 9th Baron Audley	1557	1560	
Baron Cobham of Kent (1313)	George Brooke, 9th Baron Cobham	1529	1558	Died
Baron Cobham of Kent (1313)	William Brooke, 10th Baron Cobham	1558	1597	
Baron Willoughby de Eresby (1313)	Catherine Willoughby, 12th Baroness Willoughby de Eresby	1526	1580	
Baron Dacre (1321)	Gregory Fiennes, 10th Baron Dacre	1558	1594	Attainder reversed
Baron Greystock (1321)	William Dacre, 7th Baron Greystoke	1516	1563	
Baron Bourchier (1342)	Anne Bourchier, 7th Baroness Bourchier	1540	1571	
Baron Scrope of Bolton (1371)	Henry Scrope, 9th Baron Scrope of Bolton	1549	1591	
Baron Bergavenny (1392)	Henry Nevill, 6th Baron Bergavenny	1536	1585	
Baron Berkeley (1421)	Henry Berkeley, 7th Baron Berkeley	1534	1613	
Baron Latimer (1432)	John Neville, 4th Baron Latimer	1543	1577	
Baron Dudley (1440)	John Sutton, 3rd Baron Dudley	1532	1553	Died
Baron Dudley (1440)	Edward Sutton, 4th Baron Dudley	1553	1586	
Baron Saye and Sele (1447)	Richard Fiennes, 6th Baron Saye and Sele	1528	1573	
Baron Stourton (1448)	Charles Stourton, 8th Baron Stourton	1548	1557	Died
Baron Stourton (1448)	John Stourton, 9th Baron Stourton	1557	1588	
Baron Ogle (1461)	Robert Ogle, 6th Baron Ogle	1545	1562	
Baron Mountjoy (1465)	James Blount, 6th Baron Mountjoy	1544	1582	
Baron Grey of Powis (1482)	Edward Grey, 3rd Baron Grey of Powis	1504	1552	Died, Barony fell into abeyance
Baron Willoughby de Broke (1491)	Elizabeth Willoughby, 3rd Baroness Willoughby de Broke	1535	1562	
Baron Conyers (1509)	John Conyers, 3rd Baron Conyers	1538	1557	Died, title fell into abeyance until 1641, when it was confirmed to the Baron Darcy de Knyath
Baron Monteagle (1514)	Thomas Stanley, 2nd Baron Monteagle	1523	1560	
Baron Vaux of Harrowden (1523)	Thomas Vaux, 2nd Baron Vaux of Harrowden	1523	1556	Died
Baron Vaux of Harrowden (1523)	William Vaux, 3rd Baron Vaux of Harrowden	1556	1595	
Baron Sandys of the Vine (1529)	Thomas Sandys, 2nd Baron Sandys	1540	1560	
Baron Braye (1529)	John Braye, 2nd Baron Braye	1539	1557	Died, Barony fell into abeyance until 1839
Baron Burgh (1529)	Thomas Burgh, 1st Baron Burgh	1529	1550	Died
Baron Burgh (1529)	William Burgh, 2nd Baron Burgh	1550	1584	
Baron Tailboys (1529)	Elizabeth Tailboys, 4th Baroness Tailboys of Kyme	1542	1563	
Baron Windsor (1529)	William Windsor, 2nd Baron Windsor	1543	1558	Died
Baron Windsor (1529)	Edward Windsor, 3rd Baron Windsor	1558	1574	
Baron Wentworth (1529)	Thomas Wentworth, 1st Baron Wentworth	1529	1551	Died
Baron Wentworth (1529)	Thomas Wentworth, 2nd Baron Wentworth	1551	1584	
Baron Mordaunt (1532)	John Mordaunt, 1st Baron Mordaunt	1532	1562	
Baron St John of Basing (1539)	William Paulet, 1st Baron St John of Basing	1539	1572	Created Marquess of Winchester, see above
Baron Russell (1540)	John Russel, 1st Baron Russell	1540	1555	Created Earl of Bedford, see above; Barony held by his heirs
Baron Cromwell (1540)	Gregory Cromwell, 1st Baron Cromwell	1540	1551	Died
Baron Cromwell (1540)	Henry Cromwell, 2nd Baron Cromwell	1551	1593	
Baron Eure (1544)	William Eure, 2nd Baron Eure	1548	1594	
Baron Wharton (1545)	Thomas Wharton, 1st Baron Wharton	1545	1568	
Baron Sheffield (1547)	John Sheffield, 2nd Baron Sheffield	1549	1568	
Baron Rich (1547)	Richard Rich, 1st Baron Rich	1547	1567	
Baron Willoughby of Parham (1547)	William Willoughby, 1st Baron Willoughby of Parham	1547	1570	
Baron Lumley (1547)	John Lumley, 1st Baron Lumley	1547	1609	
Baron Darcy of Aston (1548)	George Darcy, 1st Baron Darcy of Aston	1548	1558	Died
Baron Darcy of Aston (1548)	John Darcy, 2nd Baron Darcy of Aston	1558	1602	
Baron Darcy of Chiche (1551)	Thomas Darcy, 1st Baron Darcy of Chiche	1551	1558	New creation
Baron Darcy of Chiche (1551)	John Darcy, 2nd Baron Darcy of Chiche	1558	1581	
Baron Paget (1552)	William Paget, 1st Baron Paget	1552	1563	New creation
Baron North (1554)	Edward North, 1st Baron North	1554	1564	New creation
Baron Howard of Effingham (1554)	William Howard, 1st Baron Howard of Effingham	1554	1573	New creation
Baron Williams of Thame (1554)	John Williams, 1st Baron Williams of Thame	1554	1559	New creation; died, Barony fell into abeyance
Baron Chandos (1554)	John Brydges, 1st Baron Chandos	1554	1557	New creation, died
Baron Chandos (1554)	Edmund Brydges, 2nd Baron Chandos	1557	1573	
Baron Hastings of Loughborough (1558)	Edward Hastings, 1st Baron Hastings of Loughborough	1558	1572	New creation
Baron Hunsdon (1559)	Henry Carey, 1st Baron Hunsdon	1559	1596	New creation
Baron St John of Bletso (1559)	Oliver St John, 1st Baron St John of Bletso	1559	1582	New creation

== Peerage of Scotland ==
Title	Holder	Date gained	Date lost	Notes
Duke of Rothesay (1398)	none	1541	1566	
Earl of Sutherland (1235)	John Gordon, 11th Earl of Sutherland	1535	1567	
Earl of Angus (1389)	Archibald Douglas, 6th Earl of Angus	1513	1557	Died
Earl of Angus (1389)	David Douglas, 7th Earl of Angus	1557	1558	
Earl of Angus (1389)	Archibald Douglas, 8th Earl of Angus	1558	1588	
Earl of Crawford (1398)	David Lindsay, 9th Earl of Crawford	1542	1558	
Earl of Crawford (1398)	David Lindsay, 10th Earl of Crawford	1558	1574	
Earl of Menteith (1427)	John Graham, 4th Earl of Menteith	1543	1565	
Earl of Huntly (1445)	George Gordon, 4th Earl of Huntly	1524	1562	
Earl of Erroll (1452)	George Hay, 7th Earl of Erroll	1541	1573	
Earl of Caithness (1455)	George Sinclair, 4th Earl of Caithness	1529	1582	
Earl of Argyll (1457)	Archibald Campbell, 4th Earl of Argyll	1529	1558	Died
Earl of Argyll (1457)	Archibald Campbell, 5th Earl of Argyll	1558	1573	
Earl of Atholl (1457)	John Stewart, 4th Earl of Atholl	1542	1579	
Earl of Morton (1458)	James Douglas, 4th Earl of Morton	1550	1581	
Earl of Rothes (1458)	George Leslie, 4th Earl of Rothes	1513	1558	Died
Earl of Rothes (1458)	Andrew Leslie, 5th Earl of Rothes	1558	1611	
Earl Marischal (1458)	William Keith, 4th Earl Marischal	1530	1581	
Earl of Buchan (1469)	John Stewart, 3rd Earl of Buchan	1505	1551	Died
Earl of Buchan (1469)	Christina Stewart, 4th Countess of Buchan	1551	1580	
Earl of Glencairn (1488)	Alexander Cunningham, 5th Earl of Glencairn	1541	1574	
Earl of Bothwell (1488)	Patrick Hepburn, 3rd Earl of Bothwell	1513	1556	Died
Earl of Bothwell (1488)	James Hepburn, 4th Earl of Bothwell	1556	1567	
Earl of Lennox (1488)	Matthew Stewart, 4th Earl of Lennox	1526	1571	
Earl of Arran (1503)	James Hamilton, 2nd Earl of Arran	1529	1575	
Earl of Montrose (1503)	William Graham, 2nd Earl of Montrose	1513	1571	
Earl of Eglinton (1507)	Hugh Montgomerie, 3rd Earl of Eglinton	1546	1585	
Earl of Cassilis (1509)	Gilbert Kennedy, 3rd Earl of Cassilis	1527	1558	Died
Earl of Cassilis (1509)	Gilbert Kennedy, 4th Earl of Cassilis	1558	1576	
Lord Erskine (1429)	John Erskine, 5th Lord Erskine	1513	1552	de jure Earl of Mar; died
Lord Erskine (1429)	John Erskine, 6th Lord Erskine	1552	1572	de jure Earl of Mar
Lord Somerville (1430)	James Somerville, 6th Lord Somerville	1549	1569	
Lord Haliburton of Dirleton (1441)	Janet Haliburton, 7th Lady Haliburton of Dirleton	1502	1560	
Lord Forbes (1442)	William Forbes, 7th Lord Forbes	1547	1593	
Lord Maxwell (1445)	Robert Maxwell, 6th Lord Maxwell	1546	1553	Died
Lord Maxwell (1445)	Robert Maxwell, 7th Lord Maxwell	1553	1555	Died
Lord Maxwell (1445)	John Maxwell, 8th Lord Maxwell	1555	1593	
Lord Glamis (1445)	John Lyon, 7th Lord Glamis	1528	1558	Died
Lord Glamis (1445)	John Lyon, 8th Lord Glamis	1558	1578	
Lord Lindsay of the Byres (1445)	John Lindsay, 5th Lord Lindsay	1526	1563	
Lord Saltoun (1445)	Alexander Abernethy, 6th Lord Saltoun	1543	1587	
Lord Gray (1445)	Patrick Gray, 4th Lord Gray	1541	1584	
Lord Sinclair (1449)	William Sinclair, 4th Lord Sinclair	1513	1570	
Lord Fleming (1451)	James Fleming, 4th Lord Fleming	1547	1558	Died
Lord Fleming (1451)	John Fleming, 5th Lord Fleming	1558	1572	
Lord Seton (1451)	George Seton, 7th Lord Seton	1549	1586	
Lord Borthwick (1452)	John Borthwick, 5th Lord Borthwick	1542	1566	
Lord Boyd (1454)	Robert Boyd, 4th Lord Boyd	Aft. 1508	1558	Died
Lord Boyd (1454)	Robert Boyd, 5th Lord Boyd	1558	1590	
Lord Oliphant (1455)	Laurence Oliphant, 3rd Lord Oliphant	1516	1566	
Lord Livingston (1458)	Alexander Livingston, 5th Lord Livingston	1518	1553	Died
Lord Livingston (1458)	William Livingstone, 6th Lord Livingston	1553	1592	
Lord Cathcart (1460)	Alan Cathcart, 4th Lord Cathcart	1547	1618	
Lord Lovat (1464)	Alexander Fraser, 4th Lord Lovat	1544	1558	Died
Lord Lovat (1464)	Hugh Fraser, 5th Lord Lovat	1558	1577	
Lord Innermeath (1470)	John Stewart, 4th Lord Innermeath	1532	1569	
Lord Carlyle of Torthorwald (1473)	Michael Carlyle, 4th Lord Carlyle	1526	1575	
Lord Home (1473)	Alexander Home, 5th Lord Home	1549	1575	
Lord Ruthven (1488)	William Ruthven, 2nd Lord Ruthven	1528	1552	Died
Lord Ruthven (1488)	Patrick Ruthven, 3rd Lord Ruthven	1552	1566	
Lord Crichton of Sanquhar (1488)	William Crichton, 5th Lord Crichton of Sanquhar	1536	1550	Died
Lord Crichton of Sanquhar (1488)	Robert Crichton, 6th Lord Crichton of Sanquhar	1550	1561	
Lord Drummond of Cargill (1488)	David Drummond, 2nd Lord Drummond	1519	1571	
Lord Hay of Yester (1488)	John Hay, 4th Lord Hay of Yester	1543	1557	Died
Lord Hay of Yester (1488)	William Hay, 5th Lord Hay of Yester	1557	1586	
Lord Sempill (1489)	William Sempill, 2nd Lord Sempill	1513	1552	Died
Lord Sempill (1489)	Robert Sempill, 3rd Lord Sempill	1552	1576	
Lord Herries of Terregles (1490)	Agnes Maxwell, 4th Lady Herries of Terregles	1543	1594	
Lord Ogilvy of Airlie (1491)	James Ogilvy, 5th Lord Ogilvy of Airlie	1549	1606	
Lord Ross (1499)	Ninian Ross, 3rd Lord Ross	1513	1556	Died
Lord Ross (1499)	James Ross, 4th Lord Ross	1556	1581	
Lord Elphinstone (1509)	Robert Elphinstone, 3rd Lord Elphinstone	1547	1602	
Lord Methven (1528)	Henry Stewart, 1st Lord Methven	1528	1552	Died
Lord Methven (1528)	Henry Stewart, 2nd Lord Methven	1552	1572	
Lord Ochiltree (1543)	Andrew Stewart, 2nd Lord Ochiltree	1548	1591	

== Peerage of Ireland ==
Title	Holder	Date gained	Date lost	Notes
Earl of Ormond (1328)	Thomas Butler, 10th Earl of Ormond	1546	1614	
Earl of Desmond (1329)	James FitzGerald, 14th Earl of Desmond	1540	1558	Died
Earl of Desmond (1329)	Gerald FitzGerald, 14th Earl of Desmond	1558	1582	
Earl of Waterford (1446)	Francis Talbot, 5th Earl of Waterford	1538	1560	
Earl of Tyrone (1542)	Conn O'Neill, 1st Earl of Tyrone	1542	1559	Died
Earl of Tyrone (1542)	Brien O'Neill, 2nd Earl of Tyrone	1559	1562	
Earl of Clanricarde (1543)	Richard Burke, 2nd Earl of Clanricarde	1544	1582	
Earl of Thomond (1543)	Murrough O'Brien, 1st Earl of Thomond	1543	1551	Died
Earl of Thomond (1543)	Donough O'Brien, 2nd Earl of Thomond	1551	1553	Died
Earl of Thomond (1543)	Connor O'Brien, 3rd Earl of Thomond	1553	1581	
Earl of Kildare (1554)	Gerald FitzGerald, 1st Earl of Kildare	1554	1585	New creation
Viscount Gormanston (1478)	Jenico Preston, 3rd Viscount Gormanston	1532	1569	
Viscount Buttevant (1541)	John FitzJohn Barry, 1st Viscount Buttevant	1541	1553	Died
Viscount Buttevant (1541)	Edmund FitzJohn Barry, 2nd Viscount Buttevant	1553	1556	Died
Viscount Buttevant (1541)	James FitzJohn Barry, 3rd Viscount Buttevant	1556	1557	Died
Viscount Buttevant (1541)	James de Barry, 4th Viscount Buttevant	1557	1581	
Viscount Baltinglass (1541)	Rowland Eustace, 2nd Viscount Baltinglass	1549	1578	
Viscount Mountgarret (1550)	Richard Butler, 1st Viscount Mountgarret	1550	1571	New creation
Baron Athenry (1172)	Richard II de Bermingham	1547	1580	
Baron Kingsale (1223)	Gerald de Courcy, 17th Baron Kingsale	1535	1599	
Baron Kerry (1223)	Gerard Fitzmaurice, 15th Baron Kerry	1549	1550	Died
Baron Kerry (1223)	Thomas Fitzmaurice, 16th Baron Kerry	1550	1590	
Baron Slane (1370)	James Fleming, 9th Baron Slane	1517	1578	
Baron Howth (1425)	Richard St Lawrence, 7th Baron Howth	1549	1558	Died
Baron Howth (1425)	Christopher St Lawrence, 8th Baron Howth	1558	1589	
Baron Killeen (1449)	John Plunkett, 5th Baron Killeen	1510	1550	Died
Baron Killeen (1449)	Patrick Plunkett, 6th Baron Killeen	1550	1556	Died
Baron Killeen (1449)	Christopher Plunkett, 7th Baron Killeen	1556	1567	
Baron Trimlestown (1461)	Patrick Barnewall, 4th Baron Trimlestown	1538	1562	
Baron Dunsany (1462)	Robert Plunkett, 5th Baron of Dunsany	1521	1559	Died
Baron Dunsany (1462)	Christopher Plunkett, 6th Baron of Dunsany	1559	1564	
Baron Delvin (1486)	Richard Nugent, 5th Baron Delvin	1537	1559	Died
Baron Delvin (1486)	Christopher Nugent, 6th Baron Delvin	1559	1602	
Baron Power (1535)	John Power, 3rd Baron Power	1545	1592	
Baron Dunboyne (1541)	Edmond Butler, 1st Baron Dunboyne	1541	1566	
Baron Louth (1541)	Oliver Plunkett, 1st Baron Louth	1541	1555	Died
Baron Louth (1541)	Thomas Plunkett, 2nd Baron Louth	1555	1571	
Baron Carbery (1541)	Edward de Bermingham, 2nd Baron Carbery	1548	1550	Died, title extinct
Baron Upper Ossory (1541)	Barnaby Fitzpatrick, 1st Baron Upper Ossory	1541	1575	
Baron Inchiquin (1543)	Dermod O'Brien, 2nd Baron Inchiquin	1551	1557	Title previously held by the Earl of Thomond; died
Baron Inchiquin (1543)	Murrough McDermot O'Brien, 3rd Baron Inchiquin	1557	1574	
Baron Cahir (1543)	Thomas Butler, 1st Baron Cahir	1543	1558	Died
Baron Cahir (1543)	Thomas Butler, 1st Baron Cahir	1543	1558	
Baron Dunboyne (1541)	Edmond Butler, 1st Baron Dunboyne	1541	1566	
Baron Louth (1541)	Oliver Plunkett, 1st Baron Louth	1541	1555	Died
Baron Louth (1541)	Thomas Plunkett, 2nd Baron Louth	1555	1571	
Baron Carbery (1541)	Edward de Bermingham, 2nd Baron Carbery	1548	1550	Died; title extinct
Baron Upper Ossory (1541)	Barnaby Fitzpatrick, 1st Baron Upper Ossory	1541	1575	
Baron Inchiquin (1543)	Dermod O'Brien, 2nd Baron Inchiquin	1551	1557	Barony previously held by the 1st Earl of Thomond; died
Baron Inchiquin (1543)	Murrough McDermot O'Brien, 3rd Baron Inchiquin	1557	1573	
Baron Cahir (1543)	Thomas Butler, 1st Baron Cahir	1543	1558	Died
Baron Cahir (1543)	Edmund Butler, 2nd Baron Cahir	1558	1560	
Baron Ballyane (1553)	Cahir mac Art Kavanagh	1553	1555	New creation, for life; died, title extinct
Baron Ballyane (1555)	Dermot mac Cahir Kavanagh	1555	1559	New creation, for life; died, title extinct

Preceded by List of peers 1540–1549	Lists of peers by decade 1550–1559	Succeeded by List of peers 1560–1569
