= List of peers 1540–1549 =

This page lists all peers who held extant titles between 1540 and 1549.

== Peerage of England ==
| Title | Holder | Date gained | Date lost | Notes |
|---|---|---|---|---|
| Duke of Cornwall (1337) | Edward Tudor | 1537 | 1547 | Ascended the Throne, and the Dukedom merged in the Crown |
| Duke of Cornwall (1337) | none | 1537 | 1603 | |
| Duke of Norfolk (1483) | Thomas Howard, 3rd Duke of Norfolk | 1524 | 1547 | Attainted |
| Duke of Suffolk (1514) | Charles Brandon, 1st Duke of Suffolk | 1514 | 1545 | Died |
| Duke of Suffolk (1514) | Henry Brandon, 2nd Duke of Suffolk | 1545 | 1551 | |
| Duke of Somerset (1547) | Edward Seymour, 1st Duke of Somerset | 1547 | 1552 | New creation |
| Marquess of Dorset (1475) | Henry Grey, 3rd Marquess of Dorset | 1530 | 1554 | |
| Marquess of Northampton (1547) | William Parr, 1st Marquess of Northampton | 1547 | 1571 | New creation; Earl of Essex in 1543 |
| Earl of Arundel (1138) | William FitzAlan, 18th Earl of Arundel | 1524 | 1544 | Died |
| Earl of Arundel (1138) | Henry FitzAlan, 19th Earl of Arundel | 1544 | 1580 | |
| Earl of Oxford (1142) | John de Vere, 15th Earl of Oxford | 1526 | 1540 | Died |
| Earl of Oxford (1142) | John de Vere, 16th Earl of Oxford | 1540 | 1562 | |
| Earl of Westmorland (1397) | Ralph Neville, 4th Earl of Westmorland | 1499 | 1549 | |
| Earl of Westmorland (1397) | Henry Neville, 5th Earl of Westmorland | 1549 | 1564 | |
| Earl of Shrewsbury (1442) | Francis Talbot, 5th Earl of Shrewsbury | 1538 | 1560 | |
| Earl of Essex (1461) | Henry Bourchier, 2nd Earl of Essex | 1483 | 1540 | Died, Earldom extinct |
| Earl of Kent (1465) | Henry Grey, 4th Earl of Kent | 1524 | 1562 | |
| Earl of Derby (1485) | Edward Stanley, 3rd Earl of Derby | 1521 | 1572 | |
| Earl of Worcester (1514) | Henry Somerset, 2nd Earl of Worcester | 1526 | 1549 | Died |
| Earl of Worcester (1514) | William Somerset, 3rd Earl of Worcester | 1549 | 1589 | |
| Earl of Cumberland (1525) | Henry Clifford, 1st Earl of Cumberland | 1525 | 1542 | Died |
| Earl of Cumberland (1525) | Henry Clifford, 2nd Earl of Cumberland | 1542 | 1570 | |
| Earl of Rutland (1525) | Thomas Manners, 1st Earl of Rutland | 1525 | 1543 | Died |
| Earl of Rutland (1525) | Henry Manners, 2nd Earl of Rutland | 1543 | 1563 | |
| Earl of Huntingdon (1529) | George Hastings, 1st Earl of Huntingdon | 1529 | 1544 | Died |
| Earl of Huntingdon (1529) | Francis Hastings, 2nd Earl of Huntingdon | 1544 | 1561 | |
| Earl of Sussex (1529) | Robert Radcliffe, 1st Earl of Sussex | 1529 | 1542 | Died |
| Earl of Sussex (1529) | Henry Radclyffe, 2nd Earl of Sussex | 1542 | 1553 | |
| Earl of Bath (1536) | John Bourchier, 2nd Earl of Bath | 1539 | 1561 | |
| Earl of Hertford (1537) | Edward Seymour, 1st Earl of Hertford | 1537 | 1552 | Created Duke of Somerset, see above |
| Earl of Southampton (1537) | William FitzWilliam, 1st Earl of Southampton | 1537 | 1542 | Died, title extinct |
| Earl of Bridgewater (1538) | Henry Daubeney, 1st Earl of Bridgewater | 1538 | 1548 | Died, title extinct |
| Earl of Essex (1540) | Thomas Cromwell, 1st Earl of Essex | 1540 | 1540 | New creation; attainted and his honours were forfeited |
| Earl of Southampton (1547) | Thomas Wriothesley, 1st Earl of Southampton | 1547 | 1550 | New creation; also created Baron Wriothesley in 1544 |
| Earl of Warwick (1547) | John Dudley, 1st Earl of Warwick | 1547 | 1553 | New creation; Viscount Lisle in 1542 |
| Viscount Lisle (1523) | Arthur Plantagenet, 1st Viscount Lisle | 1523 | 1542 | Died, title extinct |
| Baron Grey de Wilton (1295) | William Grey, 13th Baron Grey de Wilton | 1520 | 1562 | |
| Baron Clinton (1299) | Edward Clinton, 9th Baron Clinton | 1517 | 1585 | |
| Baron De La Warr (1299) | Thomas West, 9th Baron De La Warr | 1525 | 1554 | |
| Baron Ferrers of Chartley (1299) | Walter Devereux, 10th Baron Ferrers of Chartley | 1501 | 1558 | |
| Baron Morley (1299) | Henry Parker, 10th Baron Morley | 1518 | 1556 | |
| Baron Zouche of Haryngworth (1308) | John la Zouche, 8th Baron Zouche | 1526 | 1550 | |
| Baron Audley of Heleigh (1313) | John Tuchet, 8th Baron Audley | 1512 | 1557 | |
| Baron Cobham of Kent (1313) | George Brooke, 9th Baron Cobham | 1529 | 1558 | |
| Baron Willoughby de Eresby (1313) | Catherine Willoughby, 12th Baroness Willoughby de Eresby | 1526 | 1580 | |
| Baron Dacre (1321) | Thomas Fiennes, 9th Baron Dacre | 1534 | 1541 | Barony forfeited in 1541 |
| Baron Greystock (1321) | William Dacre, 7th Baron Greystoke | 1516 | 1563 | |
| Baron Bourchier (1342) | Anne Bourchier, 7th Baroness Bourchier | 1540 | 1571 | Barony previously held by the Earl of Essex |
| Baron Scrope of Bolton (1371) | John Scrope, 8th Baron Scrope of Bolton | 1533 | 1549 | Died |
| Baron Scrope of Bolton (1371) | Henry Scrope, 9th Baron Scrope of Bolton | 1549 | 1591 | |
| Baron Lumley (1384) | John Lumley, 5th Baron Lumley | 1510 | 1545 | Died, Barony became forfeited |
| Baron Bergavenny (1392) | Henry Nevill, 6th Baron Bergavenny | 1536 | 1585 | |
| Baron Berkeley (1421) | Henry Berkeley, 7th Baron Berkeley | 1534 | 1613 | |
| Baron Latimer (1432) | John Neville, 3rd Baron Latimer | 1530 | 1543 | Died |
| Baron Latimer (1432) | John Neville, 4th Baron Latimer | 1543 | 1577 | |
| Baron Dudley (1440) | John Sutton, 3rd Baron Dudley | 1532 | 1553 | |
| Baron Saye and Sele (1447) | Richard Fiennes, 6th Baron Saye and Sele | 1528 | 1573 | |
| Baron Stourton (1448) | William Stourton, 7th Baron Stourton | 1535 | 1548 | Died |
| Baron Stourton (1448) | Charles Stourton, 8th Baron Stourton | 1548 | 1557 | |
| Baron Ogle (1461) | Robert Ogle, 5th Baron Ogle | 1530 | 1545 | Died |
| Baron Ogle (1461) | Robert Ogle, 6th Baron Ogle | 1545 | 1562 | |
| Baron Mountjoy (1465) | Charles Blount, 5th Baron Mountjoy | 1534 | 1544 | Died |
| Baron Mountjoy (1465) | James Blount, 6th Baron Mountjoy | 1544 | 1582 | |
| Baron Grey of Powis (1482) | Edward Grey, 3rd Baron Grey of Powis | 1504 | 1552 | |
| Baron Willoughby de Broke (1491) | Elizabeth Willoughby, 3rd Baroness Willoughby de Broke | 1535 | 1562 | |
| Baron Conyers (1509) | John Conyers, 3rd Baron Conyers | 1538 | 1557 | |
| Baron Monteagle (1514) | Thomas Stanley, 2nd Baron Monteagle | 1523 | 1560 | |
| Baron Vaux of Harrowden (1523) | Thomas Vaux, 2nd Baron Vaux of Harrowden | 1523 | 1556 | |
| Baron Sandys of the Vine (1529) | William Sandys, 1st Baron Sandys | 1529 | 1540 | Died |
| Baron Sandys of the Vine (1529) | Thomas Sandys, 2nd Baron Sandys | 1540 | 1560 | |
| Baron Braye (1529) | John Braye, 2nd Baron Braye | 1539 | 1557 | |
| Baron Burgh (1529) | Thomas Burgh, 1st Baron Burgh | 1529 | 1550 | |
| Baron Tailboys (1529) | George Tailboys, 2nd Baron Tailboys of Kyme | 1530 | 1540 | Died |
| Baron Tailboys (1529) | Robert Tailboys, 3rd Baron Tailboys of Kyme | 1540 | 1542 | |
| Baron Tailboys (1529) | Elizabeth Tailboys, 4th Baroness Tailboys of Kyme | 1542 | 1563 | |
| Baron Windsor (1529) | Andrew Windsor, 1st Baron Windsor | 1529 | 1543 | Died |
| Baron Windsor (1529) | William Windsor, 2nd Baron Windsor | 1543 | 1558 | |
| Baron Wentworth (1529) | Thomas Wentworth, 1st Baron Wentworth | 1529 | 1551 | |
| Baron Mordaunt (1532) | John Mordaunt, 1st Baron Mordaunt | 1532 | 1562 | |
| Baron Cromwell (1536) | Thomas Cromwell, 1st Baron Cromwell | 1536 | 1540 | Created Earl of Essex, both title forfeited |
| Baron Audley of Walden (1538) | Thomas Audley, 1st Baron Audley of Walden | 1538 | 1544 | Died, title extinct |
| Baron St John of Basing (1539) | William Paulet, 1st Baron St John of Basing | 1539 | 1572 | |
| Baron Parr (1539) | William Parr, 1st Baron Parr | 1539 | 1571 | Created Marquess of Northampton, see above |
| Baron Russell (1540) | John Russel, 1st Baron Russell | 1540 | 1555 | New creation |
| Baron Cromwell (1540) | Gregory Cromwell, 1st Baron Cromwell | 1540 | 1551 | New creation |
| Baron Parr of Horton (1543) | William Parr, 1st Baron Parr of Horton | 1543 | 1547 | New creation; died, title extinct |
| Baron Eure (1544) | William Eure, 1st Baron Eure | 1544 | 1548 | New creation; died |
| Baron Eure (1544) | William Eure, 2nd Baron Eure | 1548 | 1594 | |
| Baron Wharton (1545) | Thomas Wharton, 1st Baron Wharton | 1545 | 1568 | New creation |
| Baron Poynings (1545) | Thomas Poynings, 1st Baron Poynings | 1545 | 1545 | New creation; died, title extinct |
| Baron Sheffield (1547) | Edmund Sheffield, 1st Baron Sheffield | 1547 | 1549 | New creation; died |
| Baron Sheffield (1547) | John Sheffield, 2nd Baron Sheffield | 1549 | 1568 | |
| Baron Seymour of Sudeley (1547) | Thomas Seymour, 1st Baron Seymour of Sudeley | 1547 | 1549 | New creation; died, Barony forfeited |
| Baron Rich (1547) | Richard Rich, 1st Baron Rich | 1547 | 1567 | New creation |
| Baron Willoughby of Parham (1547) | William Willoughby, 1st Baron Willoughby of Parham | 1547 | 1570 | New creation |
| Baron Lumley (1547) | John Lumley, 1st Baron Lumley | 1547 | 1609 | New creation |
| Baron Darcy of Aston (1548) | George Darcy, 1st Baron Darcy of Aston | 1548 | 1558 | New creation |

== Peerage of Scotland ==
| Title | Holder | Date gained | Date lost | Notes |
|---|---|---|---|---|
| Duke of Rothesay (1398) | James Stewart, Duke of Rothesay | 1540 | 1541 | Died |
| Duke of Albany (1541) | Arthur Stewart, Duke of Albany | 1541 | 1541 | New creation; died, title extinct |
| Earl of Sutherland (1235) | John Gordon, 11th Earl of Sutherland | 1535 | 1567 | |
| Earl of Angus (1389) | Archibald Douglas, 6th Earl of Angus | 1513 | 1557 | |
| Earl of Crawford (1398) | David Lindsay, 8th Earl of Crawford | 1517 | 1542 | Died |
| Earl of Crawford (1398) | David Lindsay, 9th Earl of Crawford | 1542 | 1558 | |
| Earl of Menteith (1427) | William Graham, 3rd Earl of Menteith | 1537 | 1543 | |
| Earl of Menteith (1427) | John Graham, 4th Earl of Menteith | 1543 | 1565 | |
| Earl of Huntly (1445) | George Gordon, 4th Earl of Huntly | 1524 | 1562 | |
| Earl of Erroll (1452) | William Hay, 5th Earl of Erroll | 1513 | 1541 | Died |
| Earl of Erroll (1452) | William Hay, 6th Earl of Erroll | 1541 | 1541 | |
| Earl of Erroll (1452) | George Hay, 7th Earl of Erroll | 1541 | 1573 | |
| Earl of Caithness (1455) | George Sinclair, 4th Earl of Caithness | 1529 | 1582 | |
| Earl of Argyll (1457) | Archibald Campbell, 4th Earl of Argyll | 1529 | 1558 | |
| Earl of Atholl (1457) | John Stewart, 3rd Earl of Atholl | 1521 | 1542 | Died |
| Earl of Atholl (1457) | John Stewart, 4th Earl of Atholl | 1542 | 1579 | |
| Earl of Morton (1458) | James Douglas, 3rd Earl of Morton | 1513 | 1548 | Died, Earldom fell into abeyance |
| Earl of Rothes (1458) | George Leslie, 4th Earl of Rothes | 1513 | 1558 | |
| Earl Marischal (1458) | William Keith, 4th Earl Marischal | 1530 | 1581 | |
| Earl of Buchan (1469) | John Stewart, 3rd Earl of Buchan | 1505 | 1551 | |
| Earl of Glencairn (1488) | Cuthbert Cunningham, 3rd Earl of Glencairn | 1490 | 1541 | Died |
| Earl of Glencairn (1488) | Alexander Cunningham, 5th Earl of Glencairn | 1541 | 1574 | |
| Earl of Bothwell (1488) | Patrick Hepburn, 3rd Earl of Bothwell | 1513 | 1556 | |
| Earl of Lennox (1488) | Matthew Stewart, 4th Earl of Lennox | 1526 | 1571 | |
| Earl of Moray (1501) | James Stewart, 1st Earl of Moray | 1501 | 1544 | Died, title extinct |
| Earl of Arran (1503) | James Hamilton, 2nd Earl of Arran | 1529 | 1575 | |
| Earl of Montrose (1503) | William Graham, 2nd Earl of Montrose | 1513 | 1571 | |
| Earl of Eglinton (1507) | Hugh Montgomerie, 1st Earl of Eglinton | 1507 | 1545 | Died |
| Earl of Eglinton (1507) | Hugh Montgomerie, 2nd Earl of Eglinton | 1545 | 1546 | Died |
| Earl of Eglinton (1507) | Hugh Montgomerie, 3rd Earl of Eglinton | 1546 | 1585 | |
| Earl of Cassilis (1509) | Gilbert Kennedy, 3rd Earl of Cassilis | 1527 | 1558 | |
| Lord Erskine (1429) | John Erskine, 5th Lord Erskine | 1513 | 1552 | de jure Earl of Mar |
| Lord Somerville (1430) | Hugh Somerville, 5th Lord Somerville | 1523 | 1549 | Died |
| Lord Somerville (1430) | James Somerville, 6th Lord Somerville | 1549 | 1569 | |
| Lord Haliburton of Dirleton (1441) | Janet Haliburton, 7th Lady Haliburton of Dirleton | 1502 | 1560 | |
| Lord Forbes (1442) | John Forbes, 6th Lord Forbes | 1493 | 1547 | Died |
| Lord Forbes (1442) | William Forbes, 7th Lord Forbes | 1547 | 1593 | |
| Lord Maxwell (1445) | Robert Maxwell, 5th Lord Maxwell | 1513 | 1546 | Died |
| Lord Maxwell (1445) | Robert Maxwell, 6th Lord Maxwell | 1546 | 1553 | |
| Lord Glamis (1445) | John Lyon, 7th Lord Glamis | 1528 | 1558 | |
| Lord Lindsay of the Byres (1445) | John Lindsay, 5th Lord Lindsay | 1526 | 1563 | |
| Lord Saltoun (1445) | William Abernethy, 5th Lord Saltoun | 1527 | 1543 | Died |
| Lord Saltoun (1445) | Alexander Abernethy, 6th Lord Saltoun | 1543 | 1587 | |
| Lord Gray (1445) | Patrick Gray, 3rd Lord Gray | 1514 | 1541 | Died |
| Lord Gray (1445) | Patrick Gray, 4th Lord Gray | 1541 | 1584 | |
| Lord Sinclair (1449) | William Sinclair, 4th Lord Sinclair | 1513 | 1570 | |
| Lord Fleming (1451) | Malcolm Fleming, 3rd Lord Fleming | 1524 | 1547 | Died |
| Lord Fleming (1451) | James Fleming, 4th Lord Fleming | 1547 | 1558 | |
| Lord Seton (1451) | George Seton, 6th Lord Seton | 1513 | 1549 | Died |
| Lord Seton (1451) | George Seton, 7th Lord Seton | 1549 | 1586 | |
| Lord Borthwick (1452) | William Borthwick, 4th Lord Borthwick | 1513 | 1542 | Died |
| Lord Borthwick (1452) | John Borthwick, 5th Lord Borthwick | 1542 | 1566 | |
| Lord Boyd (1454) | Robert Boyd, 4th Lord Boyd | Aft. 1508 | 1558 | |
| Lord Oliphant (1455) | Laurence Oliphant, 3rd Lord Oliphant | 1516 | 1566 | |
| Lord Livingston (1458) | Alexander Livingston, 5th Lord Livingston | 1518 | 1553 | |
| Lord Cathcart (1460) | Alan Cathcart, 3rd Lord Cathcart | 1535 | 1547 | |
| Lord Cathcart (1460) | Alan Cathcart, 4th Lord Cathcart | 1547 | 1618 | |
| Lord Lovat (1464) | Hugh Fraser, 3rd Lord Lovat | 1524 | 1544 | Died |
| Lord Lovat (1464) | Alexander Fraser, 4th Lord Lovat | 1544 | 1558 | |
| Lord Innermeath (1470) | John Stewart, 4th Lord Innermeath | 1532 | 1569 | |
| Lord Carlyle of Torthorwald (1473) | Michael Carlyle, 4th Lord Carlyle | 1526 | 1575 | |
| Lord Home (1473) | George Home, 4th Lord Home | 1516 | 1549 | Died |
| Lord Home (1473) | Alexander Home, 5th Lord Home | 1549 | 1575 | |
| Lord Ruthven (1488) | William Ruthven, 2nd Lord Ruthven | 1528 | 1552 | |
| Lord Crichton of Sanquhar (1488) | William Crichton, 5th Lord Crichton of Sanquhar | 1536 | 1550 | |
| Lord Drummond of Cargill (1488) | David Drummond, 2nd Lord Drummond | 1519 | 1571 | |
| Lord Hay of Yester (1488) | John Hay, 3rd Lord Hay of Yester | 1513 | 1543 | Died |
| Lord Hay of Yester (1488) | John Hay, 4th Lord Hay of Yester | 1543 | 1557 | |
| Lord Sempill (1489) | William Sempill, 2nd Lord Sempill | 1513 | 1552 | |
| Lord Herries of Terregles (1490) | William Herries, 3rd Lord Herries of Terregles | 1513 | 1543 | Died |
| Lord Herries of Terregles (1490) | Agnes Maxwell, 4th Lady Herries of Terregles | 1543 | 1594 | |
| Lord Ogilvy of Airlie (1491) | James Ogilvy, 4th Lord Ogilvy of Airlie | 1524 | 1549 | Died |
| Lord Ogilvy of Airlie (1491) | James Ogilvy, 5th Lord Ogilvy of Airlie | 1549 | 1606 | |
| Lord Ross (1499) | Ninian Ross, 3rd Lord Ross | 1513 | 1556 | |
| Lord Avondale (1500) | Andrew Stewart, 2nd Lord Avondale | 1513 | 1543 | Exchanged the peerage for Lordship of Ochiltree, see below |
| Lord Elphinstone (1509) | Alexander Elphinstone, 2nd Lord Elphinstone | 1513 | 1547 | Died |
| Lord Elphinstone (1509) | Robert Elphinstone, 3rd Lord Elphinstone | 1547 | 1602 | |
| Lord Methven (1528) | Henry Stewart, 1st Lord Methven | 1528 | 1552 | |
| Lord Ochiltree (1543) | Andrew Stewart, 1st Lord Ochiltree | 1543 | 1548 | New creation; died |
| Lord Ochiltree (1543) | Andrew Stewart, 2nd Lord Ochiltree | 1548 | 1591 | |

== Peerage of Ireland ==
| Title | Holder | Date gained | Date lost | Notes |
|---|---|---|---|---|
| Earl of Ormond (1328) | James Butler, 9th Earl of Ormond | 1539 | 1546 | Died |
| Earl of Ormond (1328) | Thomas Butler, 10th Earl of Ormond | 1546 | 1614 | |
| Earl of Desmond (1329) | James FitzGerald, de jure 12th Earl of Desmond | 1534 | 1540 | Died |
| Earl of Desmond (1329) | James FitzGerald, 14th Earl of Desmond | 1540 | 1558 | |
| Earl of Waterford (1446) | Francis Talbot, 5th Earl of Waterford | 1538 | 1560 | |
| Earl of Tyrone (1542) | Conn O'Neill, 1st Earl of Tyrone | 1542 | 1559 | New creation |
| Earl of Clanricarde (1543) | Ulick na gCeann Burke, 1st Earl of Clanricarde | 1543 | 1544 | New creation; died |
| Earl of Clanricarde (1543) | Richard Burke, 2nd Earl of Clanricarde | 1544 | 1582 | |
| Earl of Thomond (1543) | Murrough O'Brien, 1st Earl of Thomond | 1543 | 1551 | New creation |
| Viscount Gormanston (1478) | Jenico Preston, 3rd Viscount Gormanston | 1532 | 1569 | |
| Viscount Grane (1536) | Leonard Grey, 1st Viscount Grane | 1536 | 1541 | Peerage forfeited |
| Viscount Buttevant (1541) | John FitzJohn Barry, 1st Viscount Buttevant | 1541 | 1553 | New creation |
| Viscount Baltinglass (1541) | Thomas Eustace, 1st Viscount Baltinglass | 1541 | 1549 | New creation; died |
| Viscount Baltinglass (1541) | Rowland Eustace, 2nd Viscount Baltinglass | 1549 | 1578 | |
| Viscount Clontarf (1541) | John Rawson, 1st Viscount Clontarf | 1541 | 1578 | New creation; died, title extinct |
| Viscount Kilmaule (1537) | Edmond Fitzmaurice, 1st Viscount Kilmaule | 1537 | 1541 | Died, title extinct |
| Baron Athenry (1172) | John de Bermingham | 1529 | 1547 | Died |
| Baron Athenry (1172) | Richard II de Bermingham | 1547 | 1580 | |
| Baron Kingsale (1223) | Gerald de Courcy, 17th Baron Kingsale | 1535 | 1599 | |
| Baron Kerry (1223) | Patrick Fitzmaurice, 12th Baron Kerry | 1541 | 1547 | Died |
| Baron Kerry (1223) | Thomas Fitzmaurice, 13th Baron Kerry | 1547 | 1549 | Died |
| Baron Kerry (1223) | Edmond Fitzmaurice, 14th Baron Kerry | 1549 | 1549 | Died |
| Baron Kerry (1223) | Gerard Fitzmaurice, 15th Baron Kerry | 1549 | 1550 | |
| Baron Barry (1261) | John FitzJohn Barry, 14th Baron Barry | 1534 | 1553 | Created Viscount Buttevant, see above |
| Baron Slane (1370) | James Fleming, 9th Baron Slane | 1517 | 1578 | |
| Baron Howth (1425) | Christopher St Lawrence, 5th Baron Howth | 1526 | 1542 | Died |
| Baron Howth (1425) | Edward St Lawrence, 6th Baron Howth | 1542 | 1549 | Died |
| Baron Howth (1425) | Richard St Lawrence, 7th Baron Howth | 1549 | 1558 | |
| Baron Killeen (1449) | John Plunkett, 5th Baron Killeen | 1510 | 1550 | |
| Baron Trimlestown (1461) | Patrick Barnewall, 4th Baron Trimlestown | 1538 | 1562 | |
| Baron Dunsany (1462) | Robert Plunkett, 5th Baron of Dunsany | 1521 | 1559 | |
| Baron Delvin (1486) | Richard Nugent, 5th Baron Delvin | 1537 | 1559 | |
| Baron Kilcullen (1535) | Thomas Eustace, 1st Baron Kilcullen | 1535 | 1549 | Created Viscount Baltinglass, see above |
| Baron Power (1535) | Piers Power, 2nd Baron Power | 1539 | 1545 | Died |
| Baron Power (1535) | John Power, 3rd Baron Power | 1545 | 1592 | |
| Baron Dunboyne (1541) | Edmond Butler, 1st Baron Dunboyne | 1541 | 1566 | New creation |
| Baron Louth (1541) | Oliver Plunkett, 1st Baron Louth | 1541 | 1555 | New creation |
| Baron Carbery (1541) | William de Bermingham, 1st Baron Carbery | 1541 | 1548 | New creation; died |
| Baron Carbery (1541) | Edward de Bermingham, 2nd Baron Carbery | 1548 | 1550 | |
| Baron Upper Ossory (1541) | Barnaby Fitzpatrick, 1st Baron Upper Ossory | 1541 | 1575 | New creation |
| Baron Cahir (1543) | Thomas Butler, 1st Baron Cahir | 1543 | 1558 | New creation |

| Preceded by List of peers 1530–1539 | Lists of peers by decade 1540–1549 | Succeeded by List of peers 1550–1559 |
