= John Graham, 6th Earl of Menteith =

Scottish nobleman

John Graham
- Earl of Menteith
- Tenure: 1578 – 1598
- Predecessor: William Graham, 5th Earl of Menteith
- Successor: William Graham, 7th Earl of Menteith
- Born: 1571
- Died: 1598 (aged 26–27)
- Spouse: Mary Campbell (m. 1587)
- Issue: William Graham, 7th Earl of Menteith; Christian Graham
- Father: William Graham, 5th Earl of Menteith
- Mother: Margaret Douglas

John Graham, 6th Earl of Menteith (c. 1571 – c. 1598), was a Scottish nobleman. A minor when he succeeded as Earl of Menteith, he was involved in several lawsuits.

== Biography ==
Though his birth year and age are unknown, John Graham was just a boy when his father died in 1578. Despite a lack of discussion on the topic, there is some controversy among scholars and historians surrounding the circumstances of this young earl. John was the child of William Graham, 5th Earl of Menteith, and Margaret Graham (née Douglas). About ten days before he died, William Graham allegedly wrote up a will which turned his son, John Graham, over to the care and charge of his brother-in-law, George Buchanan.

John's mother, Margaret, began an unsuccessful action in the courts for custody of her son, away from the care of George Buchanan. The case was continued on two accounts in 1578, and never was brought to trial (or the records regarding the custody action have been destroyed or lost). George Buchanan soon died, and the young earl was sent to live with John Graham of Fintry, in the northern part of Menteith. Facts available from his mother Margaret's case tend to point to a birthdate of 1571 for John Graham, while facts available in most other sources indicate an approximate birthdate of 1574.

James VI of Scotland officially recognised John Graham's claim to the earldom of Menteith in 1583, when John would have been either twelve (if he were born in 1571) or nine years old (if in 1575). He officially received the lands, despite his minority, in 1587. The young earl requested and received special dispensation from the king to inherit his land before the age of majority, and received those letters of dispensation on 7 October 1587. He was married on 22 October 1587 to Mary, third daughter of Sir Colin Campbell of Glen Orchy.

Upon his receiving the earldom, the same year that he married, he was again in a lawsuit with his mother over certain lands, which she stated were given to her by her husband, William Graham, the 5th Earl, but were now demanded by John Graham of Fintry, who was tutoring the young Earl at that time.

After the lawsuit, a small clash broke out in the lands of Kelwode (Kolwod), where Margaret Graham resided, and the people who brought the fight to Kelwode were the young earl and John Graham of Fintry, along with members of the MacFarland Clan. The earl would have been between 11 and 16 years old at the time of the invasion, depending on his date of birth. It was later written down as history that the young earl was aware of his mother being in Kelwode, and therefore "was required to find caution that she should suffer no injury." In 1587, the same year of his marriage, and possibly the same year as the attack on Kelwode, he is repeatedly referred to as "scarcely 15 years old," highlighting a further discrepancy in his possible birthdate.

In 1593, he was said to be around 20 years old and planned to travel to England to see Queen Elizabeth and the Earl of Oxford, whom he considered a kinsman.

On 6 March 1597, Earl John Graham entered into a rare legal agreement, called a mutual bond of maintenance, with Malcom MacFarlane, Feuar of Gartavertane. Mutual bonds of maintenance can be for a multitude of purposes, but are usually extended when one particular clan needed protection from the other, either from famine, or intruders, or to defend and supply one another in small wars, battles, or sieges. John Graham died shortly thereafter in December 1598.

He had a son and a daughter who survived him:

- William Graham, 7th Earl of Menteith, and
- Christian Graham, who married Sir John Blackadder of Tulliallan, Bt.

Peerage of Scotland
| Preceded by William Graham | Earl of Menteith; 1578 – c. 1598 | Succeeded by William Graham |
