= John Lyon, 8th Lord Glamis =

Scottish Nobleman

John Lyon, 8th Lord Glamis (died 1578) was a Scottish nobleman, judge and Lord High Chancellor of Scotland.

== Life ==
He was the eldest son of John Lyon, 7th Lord Glamis, by his wife, Janet Keith, daughter of Robert Keith, Master of Marischal, and sister of William Keith, 4th Earl Marischal. He succeeded as Lord Glamis on the death of his father in 1558. His name first appears in the list of members of the privy council at a meeting of 22 December 1561. On 10 September 1563 the island of Inchkeith was committed to his charge.

Glamis supported the marriage of Mary Queen of Scots with Henry Darnley, and took part in the roundabout raid against James Stewart, 1st Earl of Moray. At the time of the murder of Darnley he was in Edinburgh, but may have had no knowledge of the conspiracy. He signed the Ainslie Tavern Bond for the marriage of James Hepburn, 4th Earl of Bothwell to the queen; but later joined the association for the overthrow of Bothwell and the protection of the young king James VI of Scotland. On 16 February 1569 he was appointed one of a committee for the pursuit of George Gordon, 5th Earl of Huntly. He was one of those who voted against the queen's divorce, 31 July 1569, and assisted with other seven noblemen in bearing the body of the Regent Moray at his funeral to St Giles' Cathedral, 14 February 1570.

On 30 September 1570 Glamis was appointed an extraordinary lord of session. After Moray's death he became a close associate of his kinsman James Douglas, 4th Earl of Morton, whom in 1571 he accompanied on an embassy to England, in order to defeat proposals to restore Queen Mary to the throne. On 18 June 1572 he was ordered with other northern nobles to proceed against Adam Gordon of Auchindown, who had invaded The Mearns, and in July he barely escaped capture by Gordon at Brechin. On 2 September 1573 he and other barons of the north signed a band of allegiance to Morton, now Regent, and he was thought to be one of the most loyal of his supporters. On the death of Archibald Campbell, 5th Earl of Argyll he was appointed to succeed him as Lord chancellor of Scotland on 8 October 1573.

Like many Scottish aristocrats, Glamis was often short of money, and seems to have regularly borrowed from the Edinburgh lawyer John Shairp of Houston.

When the question of episcopacy was occupying the attention of the lords of the congregation, Glamis corresponded with Theodore Beza on the subject in 1575, and Beza wrote the treatise De triplici Episcopatu, prompted by some of his queries. After the complaint of Colin Campbell, 6th Earl of Argyll to the young king of 4 March 1578, regarding Morton's overbearing demeanour, Glamis joined with other noblemen in advising Morton's resignation, and was one of a deputation sent to ask him to resign. In consenting, Morton is supposed to have taken influenced by Glamis's advice.

== Death ==
Glamis was accidentally killed on 17 March 1578 in a street brawl in Stirling between his followers and those of David Lindsay, 11th Earl of Crawford. He was shot through the head, and David Hume of Godscroft ascribed his death to his height. At the time, several lords had come to Stirling over a power struggle involving Regent Morton and the keepers of the young James VI.

Andrew Melville composed a Latin epigram to him. Hercules Rollock wrote a Latin epitaph.

== Family ==
He married Elizabeth Abernethy, sister of Alexander Abernethy, 6th Lord Saltoun. Their children included:

- Patrick Lyon, 9th Lord Glamis
- Jean Lyon, married first to Robert Douglas younger of Lochleven, Master of Morton. Their children included William Douglas, 7th Earl of Morton. Secondly she married Archibald Douglas, 8th Earl of Angus, and thirdly Alexander Lindsay, 1st Lord Spynie.
- Elizabeth Lyon, married to Patrick Gray, 6th Lord Gray.

== Notes ==
Attribution

This article incorporates text from a publication now in the public domain: Lee, Sidney, ed. (1893). "Lyon, John (d.1578)". Dictionary of National Biography. Vol. 34. London: Smith, Elder & Co.

Peerage of Scotland
Preceded by John Lyon	Lord Glamis; 1558–1578	Succeeded by Patrick Lyon
