= William Graham, 5th Earl of Menteith =

Scottish nobleman

William Graham, 5th Earl of Menteith (c. 1555 – c. 1578), was a 16th-century Scottish nobleman.

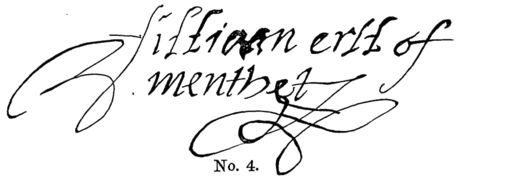
Signature of William Graham

== Biography ==
William Graham was given the gift of his own ward and marriage in 1565, following the death of his father John Graham, 4th Earl of Menteith. This suggests that he was under the age of majority at the time of his father's death. Even though he was not yet of age, he was known and acknowledged as the Earl of Menteith despite the crown holding the earldom.

He officially received the earldom from the crown in November 1571, and so it is likely that he was probably born around November 1555. He married Margaret Douglas and had two sons and a daughter:

- John Graham, who succeeded to the earldom;
- George Graham; and
- Helen Graham.

About ten days before his death, William Graham allegedly left a will that his son John should remain in the charge of George Buchanan, his brother in law.

In February 1588 his widow Margaret Douglas, Countess of Menteith was imprisoned in her house of Kelwood. Her opponents claimed she had given them a charter or lease for the house.

Peerage of Scotland
Preceded by John Graham	Earl of Menteith; 1571 – c. 1578	Succeeded by John Graham
