= Henry Parker, 11th Baron Morley =

English peer (1533–1577)

Henry Parker, 11th Baron Morley (January 1533 – 22 October 1577) was an English peer, Lord of Morley, Hingham, Hockering, &c., in Norfolk, the son of Sir Henry Parker and Grace Newport. His father was the son of Henry Parker, 10th Baron Morley and Alice St. John. His father was knighted at the coronation of Anne Boleyn and died within his father's lifetime, therefore the title passed directly to him upon the death of his grandfather in 1556.

== Career ==
He was made a Knight of the Bath at the coronation of Queen Mary I on 6 October 1553. In 1560, he became Lord Lieutenant of Hertfordshire. In 1561, he entertained Queen Elizabeth I at his principal residence, Allington Morley, Great Hallingbury, Essex. In 1569, he refused to sign the Act of Uniformity 1558 and the following year left the country without the Queen's permission. He was first based in Brussels and later in Madrid, where Philip II of Spain made him a gift of 600 ducats in 1574.

== Personal life ==
He married Lady Elizabeth Stanley, daughter of Edward Stanley, 3rd Earl of Derby and Lady Dorothy Howard, daughter of Thomas Howard, 2nd Duke of Norfolk and his second wife Agnes Tilney. She was a Lady of Honour at the court and a prominent recusant, being arrested at her house in Aldgate, London, for attending a Catholic service on Palm Sunday, 1574. She had joined her husband abroad by 1576.

Henry's successor was his son, Edward Parker, 12th Baron Morley. He also had two daughters: Mary, who married Sir Edward Leventhorpe of Shingey Hall, Hertfordshire, and Anne, who married Sir Henry Brouncker, Lord President of Munster. Mary was the mother of the first of the Leventhorpe Baronets, and Anne was the mother of the first Viscount Brouncker.

== Death ==
He died in Madrid on 22 October 1577.
