= John Graham, 4th Earl of Menteith =

Scottish nobleman

John Graham, 4th Earl of Menteith (c. 1529 – c. 1565), was a 16th-century Scottish nobleman.

== Biography ==
John Graham had a gift of his own ward and marriage in late 1543 or 1544, following the death of his father, William Graham, 3rd Earl of Menteith. This suggests that he was under the age of majority at the time of his father's death. He formally acquired the earldom of Menteith in 1547, which also may suggest that reached the age of majority at that time, suggesting a birth year of approximately 1529. He inherited the earldom after the death of his father, William Graham was killed in a clan fight some time in autumn 1543, but certainly by 23 January 1544; some sources state that he was killed in October 1543 by the Tutor of Appin (a member of the Stewart family), after the Stewarts and their army ate a wedding feast to which the Earl had been invited. Some accounts also tell of the Murrays of Athole being the raiders of the feast. According to most stories, a band of Stewarts were passing through Menteith and happened upon a wedding feast. They ate up all the food, drank all the wine, and left within a short while. The Earl pursued them and was slain or mortally wounded by the robbers.

In October 1548, Earl John Graham married Marion Seton, daughter of the 6th Lord Seton. Marion Seton went on to remarry after the death of the Earl, and likely married (as his third wife) John Gordon, 11th Earl of Sutherland. Both of them were said to have been poisoned in 1567.

In 1558, Earl John Graham joined the Lords of the Congregation and took part in the Siege of Leith. He died in late 1564 or early 1565.

He died leaving two sons, William, who succeeded to the earldom, and George.

Peerage of Scotland
Preceded by William Graham	Earl of Menteith; 1547 – c. 1565	Succeeded by William Graham
