= Donald McCarthy, 1st Earl of Clancare =

Irish Earl (d. 1596)

Donald MacCarthy Mór, 1st Earl of Clancare (died 1596) was the eldest surviving son of Donald MacCormac Ladrach MacCarthy Mor. He was the last King of Desmond. He married Lady Honora FitzGerald, daughter of James FitzGerald, 13th Earl of Desmond and Móre O'Carroll. They had two children, Teige McCarthy Mór, Lord Valentia and Lady Ellen McCarthy, who married her kinsman Florence MacCarthy.

Donald MacCarthy was knighted by Thomas Radcliffe on 26 June 1558 in Limerick, County Limerick, Ireland. McCarthy was created 1st Earl of Clancare and 1st Baron of Valentia in the Peerage of Ireland on 24 June 1565.

McCarthy renounced his title as Earl of Clancare in 1569, having joined the first Desmond Rebellion with James fitz Maurice Fitzgerald.

His son Teige died in 1587, leaving him without a male heir. In 1588, he sold the McCarthy clan estates to Sir Valentine Browne. He died without surviving male issue and was buried at Murcuss Abbey.

Peerage of Ireland
New creation	Earl of Clancare; 1565–1597	Resigned
