= Alan Cathcart, 4th Lord Cathcart =

Scottish peer and military officer (1537–1618)

Alan Cathcart, 4th Lord Cathcart (1537 – 1618) was a Scottish peer and military officer.

== Life ==
His father, Alan Cathcart, 3rd Lord Cathcart, sold Cathcart Castle to Gabriel Sempill of Ladymure in 1546, and was killed at the Battle of Pinkie in 1547. Other family lands at Cathcart were inherited by his son. The site of Cathcart Castle is in Linn Park, Glasgow.

Cathcart ownership of the lands of Sundrum and Auchincruive is recalled in a verse foretelling the demise of the family's fortunes:

Sundrum shall sink
Auchincruive shal fae
And the name o' Cathcart
Shall in time wear awae

Alan, 4th Lord Cathcart signed the Glasgow band of the west country barons to support Mary, Queen of Scots and Lord Darnley during the Chaseabout Raid on 5 September 1565. He fought against the army of Mary, Queen of Scots, at the battle of Langside in 1568.

On 3 January 1579, James VI of Scotland wrote from Stirling Castle to Lord Cathcart, commending him for his service and the expenses he had made against rebels. His loyal services had impoverished him, and his living was "grittumlie hurt". Now that Cathcart had joined royal domestic service as a Master of the Household he would be given a yearly fee of 1,000 merks.

Around this time, Cathcart completed the sale of lands and the site of the House of Bogtoun, or Bogton Castle, between Holmwood and Muirend, to John Blair of Blair and his wife Grissel Sempill (Cathcart's cousin).

== Family ==
He was a son of Alan or Allan Cathcart, 3rd Lord Cathcart, and Helen Sempill, a daughter of William Sempill, 2nd Lord Sempill. His father is sometime identified as a "Lord Sudram" (Sundrum), mentioned as a leader of the Scottish army before the battle of Solway Moss. According to some sources, his wife was Margaret Wallace, a daughter of Hugh or John Wallace of Craigie and Margaret Kennedy, later Countess of Cassillis.

He eldest son, Alan, Master of Cathcart, died in 1603. Alan 4th Lord Cathcart died in 1618 and was succeeded as Lord Cathcart by his grandson Alan Cathcart, 5th Lord Cathcart, a son of the Master of Cathcart. The 5th Lord Cathcart married Margaret Stewart, a daughter of Francis Stewart, 5th Earl of Bothwell and secondly, Jean Colquhoun, a daughter of Alexander Colquhoun of Luss.
