= James Ogilvy, 5th Lord Ogilvy of Airlie =

Scottish landowner and diplomat (died 1606)

James Ogilvy, 5th Lord Ogilvy of Airlie (died 1606) was a Scottish landowner and diplomat.

== Life ==
Ogilvy was the son of James, Master of Ogilvy, and Katherine Campbell, Countess of Crawford, a daughter of Sir John Campbell of Cawdor. His father, the Master of Ogilvy, was killed in 1547 at the Battle of Pinkie and his mother became the tutor to her children.

His home was Airlie Castle, which he planned to rebuild or extend in 1564.

In June 1562, James Ogilvie of Cardell and John Gordon fought over their rights in court and on the High Street of Edinburgh. James, Lord Ogilvy, joined the fighting and was wounded in the arm. The fight was noted by Thomas Randolph and John Knox. Gordon was briefly imprisoned in the tolbooth of Edinburgh, and James Ogilvie of Cardell in the "over council house". Lord Ogilvy's injuries were attended by the physician Robert Henderson, who described the risk that he would bleed to death.

Ogilvy was reported to have signed the Ainslie Tavern Bond in April 1567, an agreement that Mary, Queen of Scots, would marry James Hepburn, 4th Earl of Bothwell.

In April 1587 Ogilvy wrote to Patrick Vans of Barnbarroch recommending his servant Robert Bruce to join an embassy to Denmark, because they had both recently been in Denmark.

James VI was invited to Denmark in May 1596 by the ambassador Steen Bille to attend the coronation of his brother-in-law Christian IV. He appointed Lord Ogilvy and Peter Young as his ambassadors to go in his place, because his wife Anne of Denmark was pregnant, and they were accredited by Christian IV in a letter dated 6 August 1596. James VI rode from Falkland to Dundee to see them depart. As well as offering James's good wishes, and apologising for the absence of James and Anne of Denmark, they were to ask for ships and troops for a mission planned against the Western islanders of Scotland in 1597.

== Marriage and family ==
In 1558, James Ogilvy married Jean Forbes, a daughter of William, Lord Forbes and Elizabeth Keith. Their children included:

- Margaret Ogilvy, who married (1) George Keith, 5th Earl Marischal, and (2) Sir Alexander Strachan of Thornton
- James Ogilvy, 6th Lord Ogilvy of Airlie, father of James Ogilvy, 1st Earl of Airlie. He joined the court of James VI in October 1580 as a gentleman of the bedchamber.
- David Ogilvy, in July 1602 he was attacked on his way from Holyrood Abbey by followers of the Lindsay family and badly injured and his servant William Innes was killed.
- Francis Ogilvy of Newgrange
- John Ogilvy of Craig. His home, Craig Castle, near the Kirkton of Glenisla, or another house called Craig, nearer Montrose, was slighted following the orders of James VI in October 1594 and March 1595.
- Patrick Ogilvy of Muirtown

Peerage of Scotland
Preceded by James Ogilvy	Lord Ogilvy of Airlie; 1549–1606	Succeeded by James Ogilvy
