= Alexander Abernethy, 6th Lord Saltoun =

Alexander Abernethy, 6th Lord Saltoun (died 1587) was a Scottish landowner and courtier.

He was the son of William Abernethy, 5th Lord Saltoun (d. 1543), and Elizabeth Hay daughter of John Hay, 2nd Lord Hay of Yester (d. 1513). The Abernethy estates included Saltoun in East Lothian. His house in the north was Rothiemay, described in the sixteenth century as "a palace very fair".

When Mary of Guise was fatally ill in Edinburgh Castle, Saltoun, Lord James Stewart, and the Earl Marischal had dinner with her on 8 June 1560.

Saltoun favoured the cause of James VI of Scotland in the Marian Civil War. He was one of the lords who signed on 1 May 1570 the instructions given to Robert Pitcairn, Commendator of Dunfermline, as ambassador to England, asking Queen Elizabeth to declare support for the regime in Scotland, and for English troops.

On 23 August 1570 Saltoun wrote with the Laird of Pitsligo from Rothiemay to the Earl of Morton with news of a ship arrived at Aberdeen and its passengers. It was a Flanders "pink" carrying Mr John Hamilton and two Spanish servants of the Duke of Alva. They went to Huntly Castle to see the Earl of Huntly with Mr Robert Gordon, but missed the Earl and returned to Aberdeen. John Hamilton had been to the Duke of Alva seeking support for the cause of Mary, Queen of Scots. He heard they would bring 6,000 men to land at Aberdeen. This intelligence came by "quiet means" from a favourer of the king's party.

In a second letter from Glenbervie Saltoun described the two servants of the Duke of Alba on the "pink" as a Florentine called Caesar Ruspoty and a man from Picardy called Philip Hensier. The Prior of Coldingham and Sir James Balfour were going to depart from Aberdeen in the "pink", while Lord Seton and Katherine Neville, Countess of Northumberland were going to take another boat. The contemporary chronicle, The Historie of James the Sext adds that the "pink" brought armour and firearms for six hundred men, seven cannons, with gunpowder and money for Huntly, who was the Queen's Lieutenant of the North.

In 1578 Saltoun was noted in a list, perhaps in error, as a supporter of Mary, Queen of Scots.

== Family ==
He married Alison Keith (d. 1567), daughter of William Keith, 4th Earl Marischal. Their children included:

- George Abernethy, 7th Lord Saltoun, who married Margaret Stewart, daughter of John Stewart, 4th Earl of Atholl. In 1574 George, Master of Saltoun, killed a member of the Innes family, a kinsman of Regent Morton.
- Elizabeth Abernethy, married John Innes of Innes.
- Alexander Abernethy, married Elizabeth Crichton, daughter of Sir James Crichton of Frendraught.
- Jean Abernethy, who married (1) Alexander Seton of Meldrum, and (2) John Urquhart of Craigfintry, the Tutor of Cromarty.

The 6th Lord's sister, Elizabeth Abernethy, married (1) William Meldrum of Fyvie, and (2) John Lyon, 8th Lord Glamis.

Peerage of Scotland
Preceded by William Abernethy	Lord Saltoun; 1540–1587	Succeeded by George Abernethy
