= William Keith, 4th Earl Marischal =

Scottish nobleman and politician

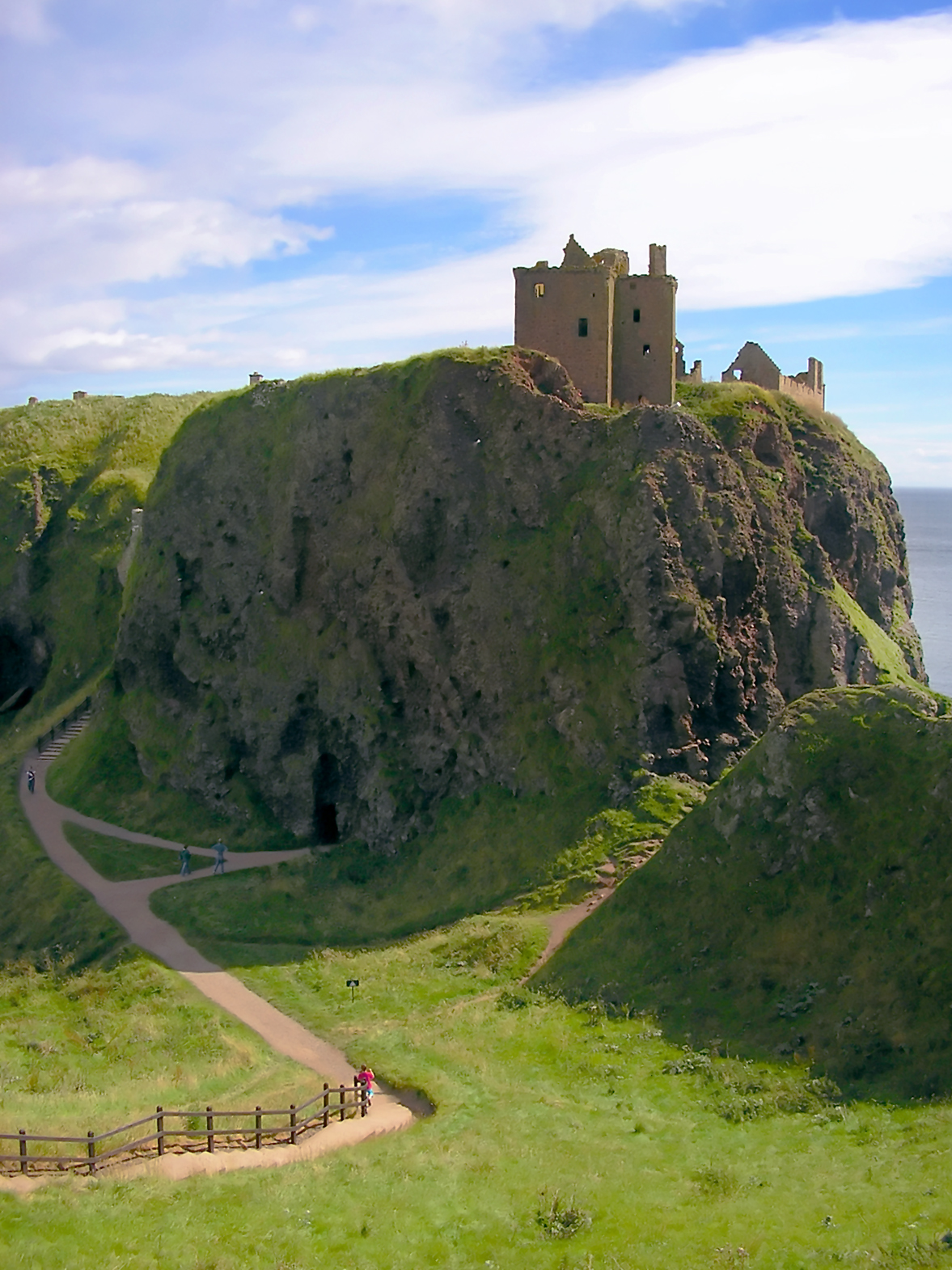
Dunnottar Castle, seat of the Earls Marischal

William Keith, 4th Earl Marischal (died 7 October 1581) was a Scottish nobleman and politician.

== Family background and career ==
William Keith was the son of Robert Keith, Master of Marischal and Lady Elizabeth Douglas, daughter of John Douglas, 2nd Earl of Morton. He succeeded his grandfather, William Keith, 3rd Earl Marischal. He was one of the earls who accompanied James V to France for his marriage to Madeleine of Valois, daughter of King Francis I of France. The wedding took place on 1 January 1537 at Notre Dame Cathedral in Paris and was followed by days of Jousting at the Louvre.

He fought at the Battle of Pinkie in 1547, in which the Scots were defeated by the English forces led by Edward Seymour, 1st Duke of Somerset in a bloody battle that was part of the war known as the Rough Wooing. Keith was said to have been in favour of the proposed marriage between the infant Mary, Queen of Scots, and Prince Edward of England, son of King Henry VIII.

He held the Office of Extraordinary Lord of Session in 1541, 1561, and lastly in 1573. In 1561, he was a member of Queen Mary's Privy Council, and while refraining from extreme partisanship, he was an adherent of the Reformation. Later, the Earl Marischal retired with his great fortune to a secluded life at Dunnottar Castle becoming known locally as "William of the Tower." The Earl died on 7 October 1581.

== Marriage and issue ==
He married Margaret Keith, a daughter of William Keith of Inverugie. William and Margaret had thirteen children:

- William Keith, Master of Marischal (died 1580).
- Robert Keith, 1st Lord Altrie (died 1596).
- John Keith, probable Rector of Duffas.
- Agnes Keith, Countess of Moray (or Annas), m. 1st to the James Stewart, 1st Earl of Moray, 2nd. to Colin Campbell, 6th Earl of Argyll. She died 16 July 1588 at Edinburgh.
- Alexander Keith
- Alison, m. to Alexander Abernethy, 6th Lord Saltoun (died 1587).
- Mary, m. to Sir John Campbell of Calder (dispensation for consanguinity).
- Beatrice, m. to Sir John Allardice of Allardice. She died 19 May 1596.
- Joneta, m. to James Crichton of Frendraught.
- Margaret, m. to John Kennedy of Blairquhan.
- Elizabeth, m. to Sir Alexander Irvine of Drum. Their son Robert Irvine was Master of Household to George, Earl Marischal, during his diplomatic mission to Denmark.
- Isobel, m. Alexander Strachan of Thornton. She died August 1595.
- Barbara, promised in m., failing her sister Isobel, to Alexander Strachan; m. Alexander Forbes of Pitsligo.

Keith's chief residence was Dunnottar Castle in Aberdeenshire.

When he died on 7 October 1581, he was succeeded by his grandson, George Keith, son of William, Master of Marischal; George became the 5th Earl Marischal.

== Arms ==
Coat of arms of the Earl Marischal
Crest A Hart's Head erased proper armed with ten Tynes Or. Escutcheon Argent on a Chief Gules three Palets Or; behind the shield two Baton Gules semy of Thistles ensigned on the top with an Imperial Crown Or placed saltirewise being the insignia of the office of Great Marischal of Scotland. Supporters On either side a Hart proper attired as in the Crest. Motto Veritas Vincit (Truth conquers)

Peerage of Scotland
Preceded by William Keith	Earl Marischal; 1530-1581	Succeeded by George Keith
