= Tailboys =

Tailboys or Talboys was the name of a prominent gentry family from Lincolnshire, England.

People of this surname include:

- Ivo Taillebois (d. 1094), Norman landholder in Lincolnshire and sheriff
- Brian Talboys (1921–2012), New Zealand politician
- Elizabeth Blount (d. 1539/40), also known as Bessie Blount, who became Baroness Tailboys on her marriage
- Elizabeth Tailboys, 4th Baroness Tailboys of Kyme (c.1520–1563)
- George Tailboys, 2nd Baron Tailboys of Kyme (c.1523–1540)
- Gilbert Tailboys (c.1497/8–1530), 1st Baron Tailboys of Kyme, husband of Elizabeth Blount
- Graeme K. Talboys (b. 1953), English writer
- Keith Talboys (1931–2020), English cricketer
- Robert Tailboys, 3rd Baron Tailboys of Kyme (c.1528–1542)
- Steve Talboys (1966–2019), English footballer
- Sir William Tailboys (c.1415–1464), 7th Baron Tailboys of Kyme, Lincolnshire squire

== Other uses ==
- "Talboys", the fictional country home of Lord Peter Wimsey and his wife Harriet

== See also ==
- Tallboy (disambiguation)
