= Elizabeth Tailboys =

Elizabeth Tailboys may refer to:

- Elizabeth Blount, married name Elizabeth Tailboys, Henry VIII's mistress
- Elizabeth Tailboys, 4th Baroness Tailboys of Kyme
