= Baron Tailboys of Kyme =

English noble title

The title Baron Tailboys of Kyme, Lincolnshire, was created in 1529 for Gilbert Tailboys, the stepfather of Henry FitzRoy, 1st Duke of Richmond and Somerset (1519–1536), who was himself the only illegitimate child acknowledged by King Henry VIII of England.

== Barons Tailboys of Kyme ==
- Gilbert Tailboys, 1st Baron Tailboys of Kyme (c. 1497 – 1530), the husband of Elizabeth Blount, Henry VIII's former mistress;
- George Tailboys, 2nd Baron Tailboys of Kyme (c. 1523 – 1540), eldest son of the first Baron;
- Robert Tailboys, 3rd Baron Tailboys of Kyme (c. 1528 – 1542), younger brother of the second Baron;
- Elizabeth Tailboys, 4th Baroness Tailboys of Kyme (c. 1520 – 1563), elder sister of the third Baron, and upon whose death the title became extinct.
