= Tallboy =

Tallboy or tall boy may refer to:

- Tallboy (bomb), a British deep penetration earthquake bomb of the Second World War
- Tallboy (furniture), a piece of furniture incorporating a chest of drawers and a wardrobe
- Tallboy beer can, a 16 US fl oz (473 ml) beer beverage can in the United States
- Tall Boy, a lager-style beer produced in Vietnam by Bier Hoi Brewing Company
- Air dancer, an inflatable moving advertising device originally called the Tall Boy
- Mountain bike made by Santa Cruz Bicycles
- Spanker (sail), a type of sail also known as a tallboy
- Tall Boy (character), a character in the U.S. TV series Riverdale

== See also ==
- Tailboys (disambiguation)
- Talboys, a fictional farmhouse, the setting of the novel Busman's Honeymoon by Dorothy L. Sayers
