= Kyme Priory =

Former Augustinian priory in South Kyme, Lincolnshire

Coordinates: 53.0326°N 0.2589°W

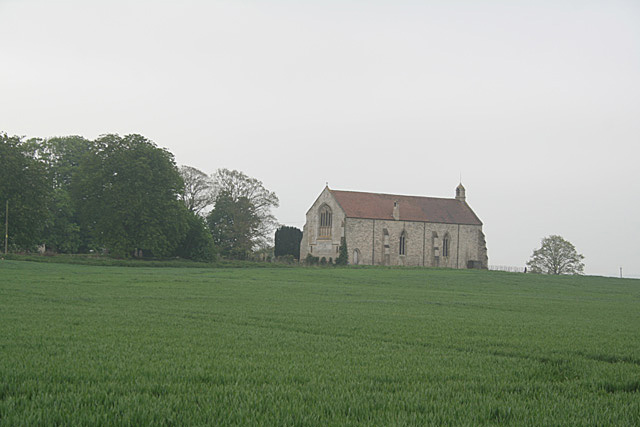
South Kyme Church - site of the Augustinian Priory of Kyme

Kyme Priory was a priory in South Kyme, Lincolnshire, England. What remains of the buildings are now part of Saint Mary and All Saints Church.

The Augustinian Priory of Kyme was founded by Philip of Kyme, steward to Gilbert Earl of Lincoln, before 1169, in honour of the Blessed Mary, for about twelve Canons.

In 1377 Bishop Bokyngham held a visitation, and he found the canons were in the habit of serving their appropriate churches in person, and not by means of secular vicars, and their community life had suffered in consequence. The Bishop ordered that none of them should serve churches or take charge of granges distant from the monastery, in order that the divine office might be well sustained. They were forbidden to wear swords or any other weapons, or to have their habits unnecessarily ornamented. There are also injunctions as to going out without leave, eating and drinking outside the monastery, or entertaining friends too liberally within it. Similar injunctions were issued by Bishop Flemyng in 1422. An order was given by Bishop Repyngdon in 1417 to bring back a canon who had gone without leave to join the Carmelites at Nottingham.

Bishop Alnwick's visitation in 1440 is preserved in full. The prior complained that his canons were too fond of idle sports. The cellarer complained that there were too many boys in the choir, which was a hindrance to the divine office: he said the infirmary was out of repair, and that the obedientiaries ate in the town of Kyme when they went there on business, and one canon hunted for his own profit. Others complained of the accumulation of offices in the hands of a few, and of the too free access of seculars to choir and refectory. The bishop dealt with all these points. The time spent in games should be given rather to contemplation, reading and study; seculars should be banished from choir and refectory, and the infirmary repaired.

In 1534 the clear revenue of the priory was £101 0s. 4d., including the churches of Kyme, Swarby, Ewerby, Osbournby, Metheringham, Thorpe near Wainfleet, Calceby, Croft, Northolme, and Wainfleet All Saints.

The canons of Kyme at the time of the first Act of Suppression loved their monastery and their religious life well enough to pay a heavy fine for continuance. Despite making only £200 a year, they paid an annual £200 fee to continue. The little priory survived until the dissolution of the monasteries. The last Prior was Ralph Fairfax, who was elected in 1511, and the priory surrender took place on 6 July 1539. It was given to the Earl of Rutland and Robert Tyrwhitt.

== Burials ==
- Gilbert Tailboys, 1st Baron Tailboys of Kyme
- Elizabeth Blount, his wife

== Saint Mary and All Saints Church ==
Saint Mary and All Saints Church, at South Kyme, formed the south aisle and part of the nave of the priory church. It was greatly altered and partly rebuilt in 1805. It is today a Grade II* listed building.

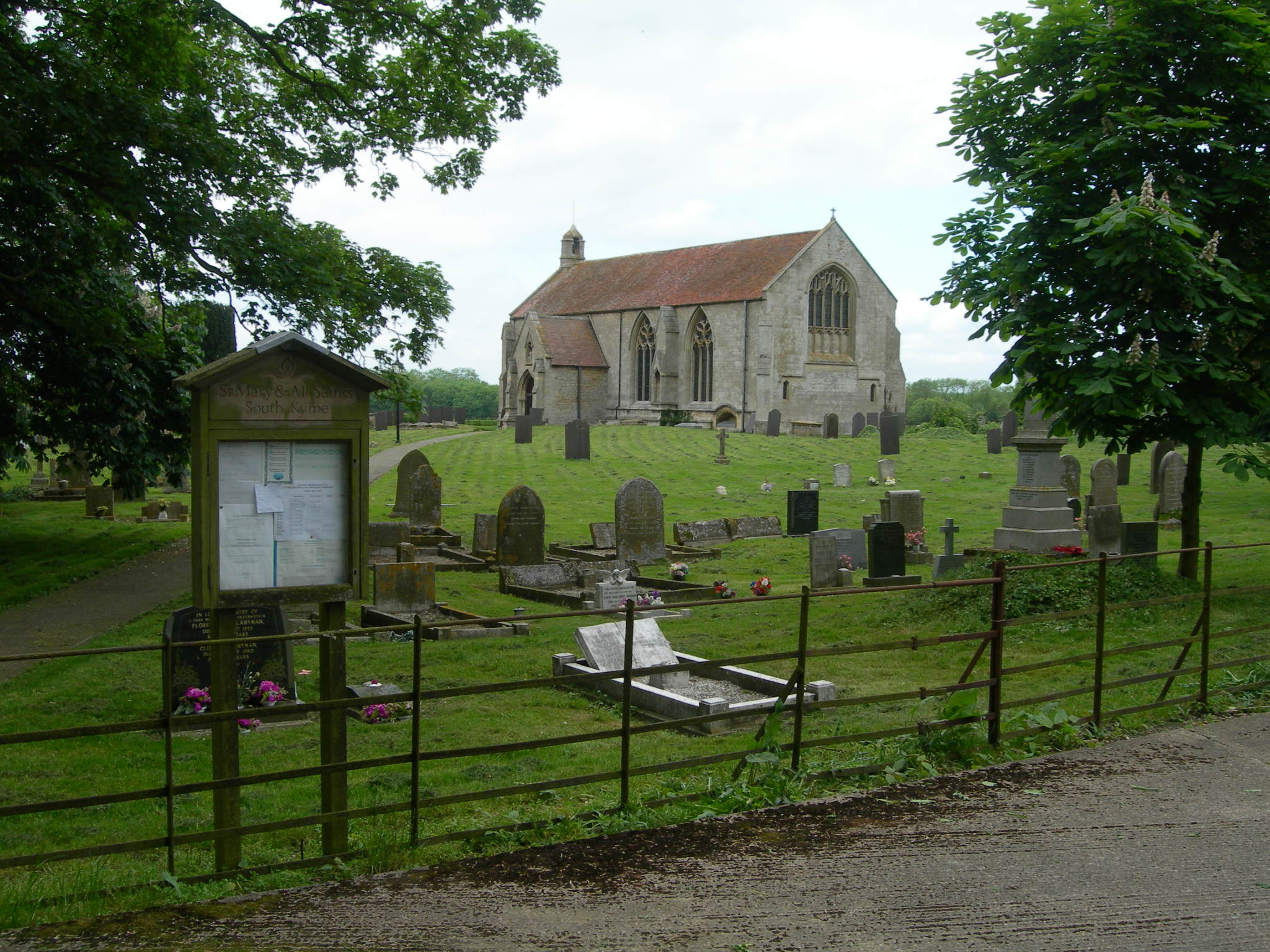

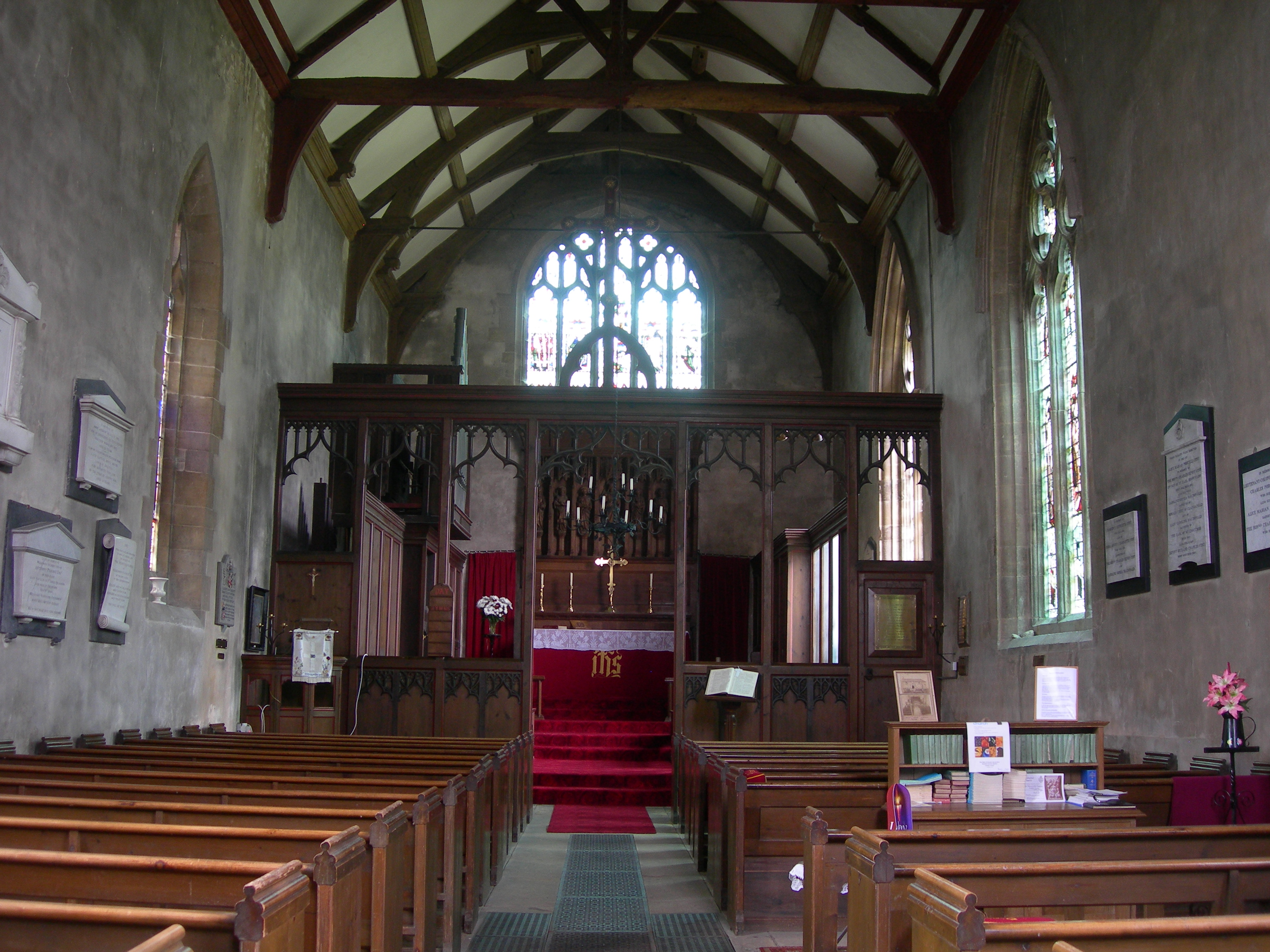

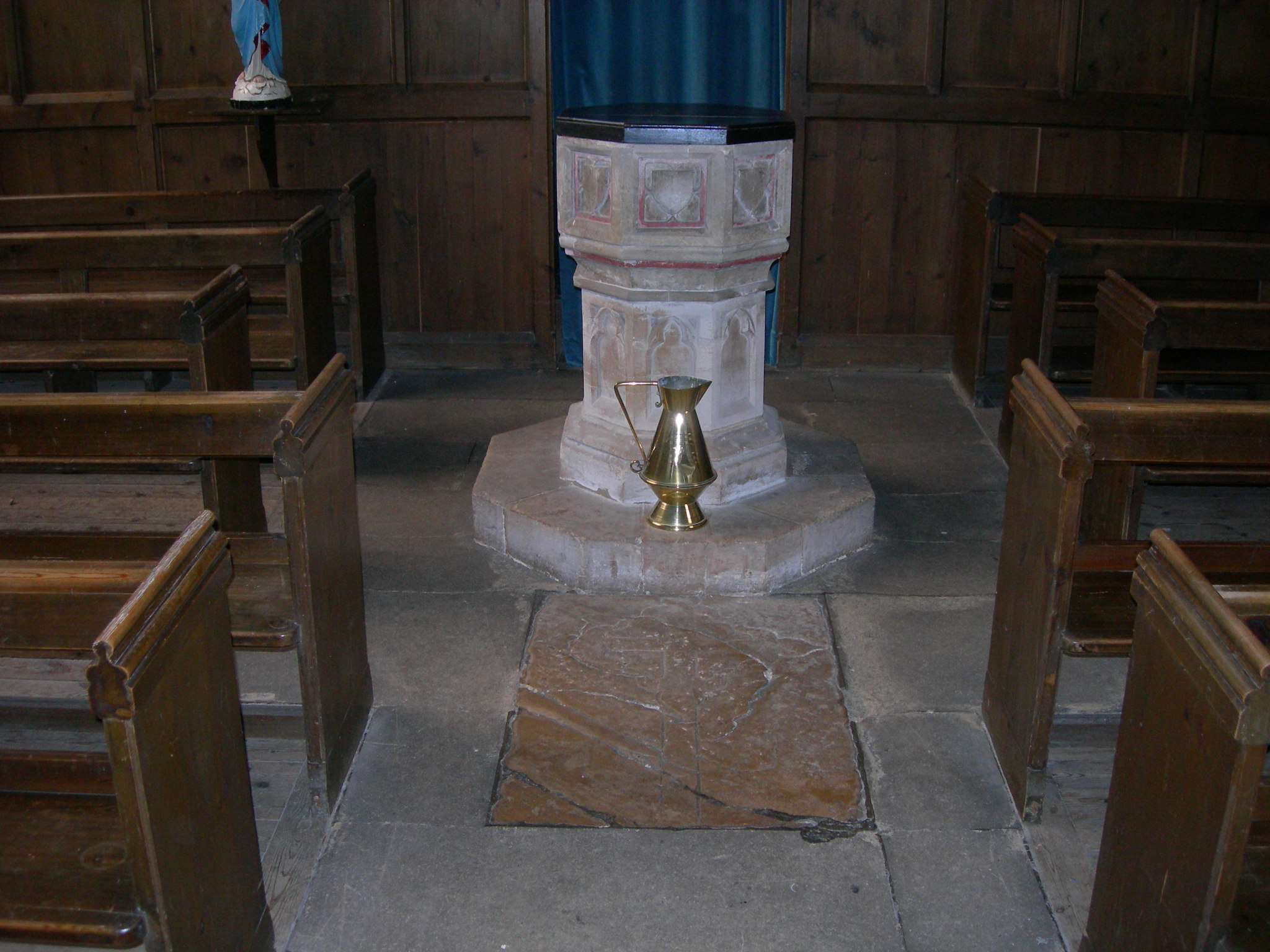

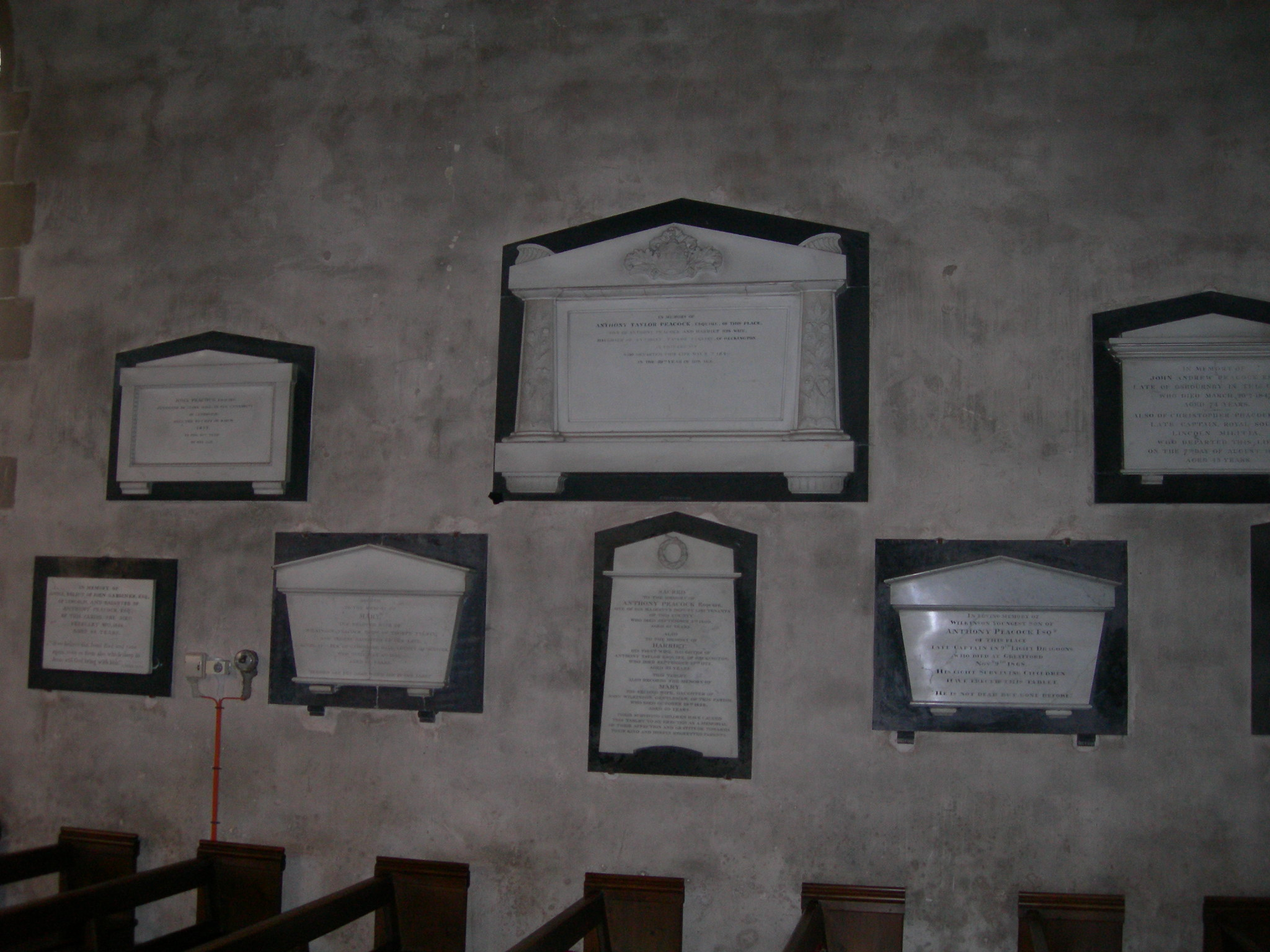

== See also ==
- List of English abbeys, priories and friaries serving as parish churches
