= John Palsgrave =

Tudor priest, tutor and author (c.1485-1554)

John Palsgrave (c. 1485 – 1554) was a priest of Henry VIII of England's court. He is known as a tutor in the royal household, and as a textbook author.

== Life ==
It is believed that John Palsgrave, who spelled his name in a variety of ways including Pagrave, was the eldest son of Henry Pagrave of North Barningham, in Norfolk.

After studying at Corpus Christi College, Cambridge, B.A. 1504, he travelled to France to study in Paris where he qualified as M.A. He became tutor to Princess Mary Tudor in 1513, receiving the sum of £6-13s-4d per annum. When she married Louis XII of France, he accompanied her to Paris, but by 1516 he had moved to Louvain; Sir Thomas More wrote to Erasmus to recommend him to study law and classics there.

In 1518 he was instituted to the benefices in Asfordby in Leicestershire, Alderton and Holbrook in Suffolk, and Keyston, Huntingdonshire.

In 1525, he was appointed tutor to Henry's illegitimate son Henry Fitzroy; the programme of studies was ambitious, following lines suggested by More, Stephen Gardiner and Thomas Elyot, and including music, visual aids and the company of William Parr and the younger brothers of the boy's mother Elizabeth Blount. He was succeeded in the post by Richard Croke in 1526, for reasons that may include the hostility of Thomas Wolsey, who had earlier refused to appoint Palsgrave as Archdeacon of Derby. His past connections meant that Palsgrave was called in by the Duke of Suffolk to write a pamphlet derogatory of Wolsey's career, in 1529.

He then continued private tutoring whilst working on his book. In 1533 he was ordained priest by Thomas Cranmer and instituted to the benefice of St Dunstan in the East. In 1545 he was presented to the living of Wadenhoe in Northamptonshire by Charles Blount, 5th Baron Mountjoy, one of his former pupils.

== Works ==
He composed L'esclarcissement de la langue francoyse (printed in 1530 in London and dedicated to Henry VIII). The book, written in English despite its French title, is said to be the first grammar of the French language. Its purpose was to help Englishmen who wanted to learn French. According to the Oxford English Dictionary, the humblebee, a term that had been in use since 1450, was called a bumblebee for the first time in this book. The sentence was: I bomme, as a bombyll bee dothe.

He also translated William Fullonius's Latin play, The Comedy of Acolastus, which he published in 1540 and dedicated to the King. The first simile of the English phrase "as deaf as a post" appears to originate from Acolastus ("How deaf an ear I intended to give him ... he were as good to tell his tale to a post") and may be attributed to Palsgrave.
