= Gilbert Tailboys, 1st Baron Tailboys of Kyme =

English courtier and Member of Parliament

Gilbert Tailboys
- 1st Baron Tailboys of Kyme
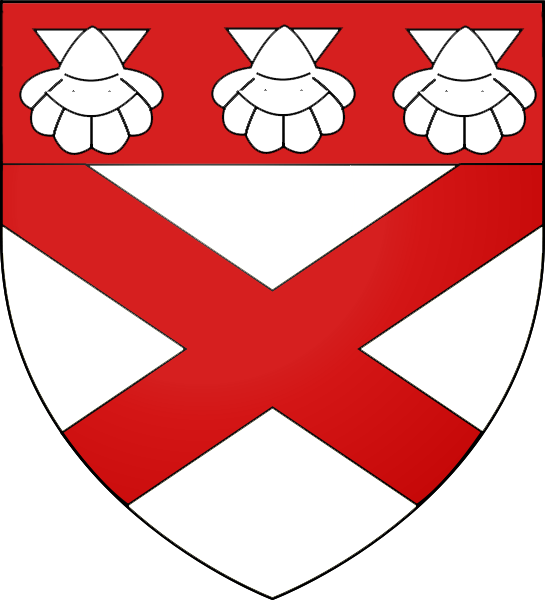
- Born: c. 1497
- Died: 30 April 1530 (aged c.33)
- Buried: South Kyme Church
- Spouse: Elizabeth Blount
- Issue: Elizabeth Tailboys, 4th Baroness Tailboys of Kyme; George Tailboys, 2nd Baron Tailboys of Kyme; Robert Tailboys, 3rd Baron Tailboys of Kyme
- Parents: George Tailboys, Lord Tailboys of Kyme; Elizabeth Gascoinge

Gilbert Tailboys or Talboys, 1st Baron Tailboys of Kyme (c.1497/98 – 30 April 1530) was an English courtier and Member of Parliament during the reign of Henry VIII of England.

== Life ==
He was only son of Sir George Talboys (1467–1538), by Elizabeth, daughter of Sir William Gascoigne and Margaret Percy. George’s parents were married after 14 November 1496, making Gilbert, the eldest son born around 1497 or 1498. In 1520, when he married Elizabeth Blount he was therefore around twenty three.

Gilbert Talboys was keeper of Harbottle Castle in 1509, and served in the French war in 1513. George Talboys became insane in March 1517, and was placed under the charge of Cardinal Wolsey. In February 1530–31, being then described as a ‘lunatic,’ he was given into the custody of the Duke of Norfolk, and he did not die until 21 September 1538.

Gilbert, his eldest son, came to court under Wolsey's protection. He married, before 18 June 1520, Elizabeth "Bessie" Blount, daughter of Sir John Blount of Kinlet, Shropshire, and a mistress of Henry VIII. In 1522, when the King had finished his relationship with Bessie Blount, Tailboys was chosen as a suitable husband for her, probably through his family's links to Cardinal Wolsey, who was then the King's chief minister. Bessie had borne the King his only acknowledged illegitimate child, Henry FitzRoy, 1st Duke of Richmond and Somerset, a possible heir to the throne.

Gilbert Talboys and his wife had a grant of Rokeby, Warwickshire, in 1522, and in 1523 they received lands in Yorkshire under an act of parliament. In March 1527 he was one of the gentlemen of the king's chamber. He was appointed High Sheriff of Lincolnshire for 1526–27 and was returned as one of the members for Lincolnshire to the parliament which met on 3 November 1529. He was soon after created Baron Talboys of Kyme and took his seat on 1 December, but died on 15 April 1530. He was buried in Kyme church (the former Kyme Priory), where his memorial tablet still exists.

== Family ==
By his wife, Elizabeth Blount, Tailboys had three children:

1. Elizabeth Tailboys, 4th Baroness Tailboys of Kyme, born c. 1520, died 1563, who at her brother's death became the 4th Baroness Tailboys of Kyme. Married firstly Thomas Wymbish, of Nocton (died 1553), who claimed the title in his wife's right. It was, however, ruled that a husband could not so bear his wife's title unless he had issue by her; this ruling was the final decision on the point. Married secondly, before 13 November 1553, as his second wife, Ambrose Dudley, 3rd Earl of Warwick (1529–1589) She died about 1560, and, as she had no issue, the barony became extinct.
2. George Tailboys, 2nd Baron Tailboys of Kyme, born c. 1523, who succeeded as 2nd Baron Tailboys of Kyme, and died on 6 September 1539. Married Margaret Skipwith in 1539. No issue.
3. Robert Tailboys, 3rd Baron Tailboys of Kyme, de Jure Lord Kyme, born c. 1528, died June 1542.

Peerage of England
New creation	Baron Tailboys of Kyme; 1st creation 1529–1530	Succeeded by George Tailboys
