= Wilhelm Gnapheus =

Dutch-born Protestant religious figure (1493–1568)

Wilhelm (sometimes William, Willem, Guilielmus) Gnapheus (de Volder, van de Voldesgraft, Fulonius; 1493 in The Hague – 29 September 1568 in Norden, Lower Saxony) was a Dutch-born Protestant religious figure and writer.

After studying at the University of Cologne, in 1520 Gnapheus became dean of a Latin school in The Hague, where he encountered Reformation ideas. When in 1523 he and Cornelis Hoen were arrested, he met Jan de Bakker (Johannes Pistorius), the first Protestant martyr (1525) in the Netherlands. Gnapheus had been incarcerated together with de Bakker, but was released, then had to flee the inquisition.

In 1523, because of religious persecution, Gnapheus emigrated to northern Germany. He wrote a play in Latin, Acolastus, based on the story of the Prodigal Son. This was performed by his pupils in 1529, and was translated into German in 1530 by Georg Binder of Zürich, published in 1536. In 1540 it was published in English translation by John Palsgrave.

In 1531 Gnapheus went with a group to the city of Elbing (Elbląg) in Royal Prussia, Poland. The neighboring Duchy of Prussia had converted to Lutheranism in 1525. At the request of the Elbing city council, he opened a Latin school, which he operated in 1535-41. While there, Gnapheus was involved in a carnival play which mocked Prince-Bishop Mauritius Ferber, Nicolaus Copernicus and other Catholic clergy of the neighboring Prince-Bishopric of Ermeland. Since 1537, Johannes Dantiscus, Ferber's successor as prince-bishop, spoke out against Gnapheus, who had to move on to the court of Duke Albert of Prussia in Königsberg (Królewiec).

Until 1547, Gnapheus taught at what in 1544 became the University of Königsberg. Due to conflicts between the local Lutherans and Gnapheus' Dutch Reformed Church, he was removed from his post.

Gnapheus served as tutor for Countess Anna of Oldenburg, consort in East Frisia, in Norden until his death in 1568.

== Works ==
- Heinrich Babucke (1879). "Gnapheus, Wilhelm" . Allgemeine Deutsche Biographie (in German). Vol. 9. Leipzig: Duncker & Humblot. pp. 279–280.
- Rolf Tarot (1964). "Gnapheus, Gulielmus". Neue Deutsche Biographie (in German). Vol. 6. Berlin: Duncker & Humblot. pp. 482–483.
- Friedrich Wilhelm Bautz (1990). "Gnapheus, Guilielmus". In Bautz, Friedrich Wilhelm (ed.). Biographisch-Bibliographisches Kirchenlexikon (BBKL) (in German). Vol. 2. Hamm: Bautz. cols. 256–257. ISBN 3-88309-032-8.
