= Robert Tailboys, 3rd Baron Tailboys of Kyme =

English nobleman

Robert Tailboys
- Baron Tailboys of Kyme
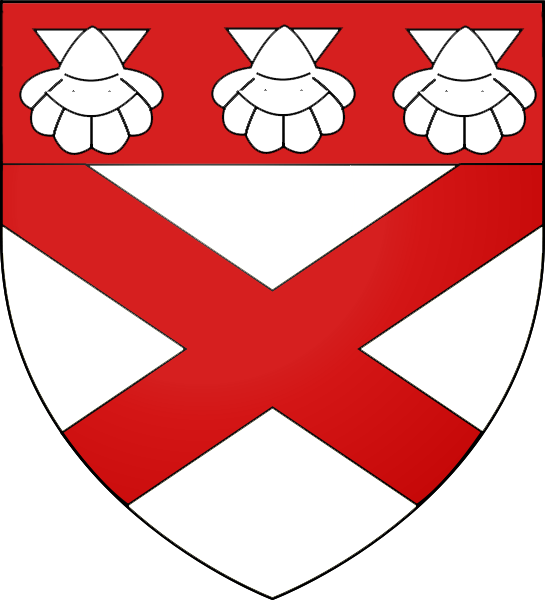
- Born: c. 1528
- Died: c. 1542 (aged c.14)
- Buried: Unknown
- Parents: Gilbert Tailboys, 1st Baron Tailboys of Kyme; Elizabeth Blount

Robert Tailboys (c. 1528 – c. 26 June 1542) was a younger son of Elizabeth Blount and Gilbert Tailboys, 1st Baron Tailboys of Kyme. Through his mother he was the half brother of Henry FitzRoy, Duke of Richmond and Somerset, who was the only illegitimate offspring acknowledged by Henry VIII, King of England.

== Birth ==
He was most likely the youngest child of Elizabeth Blount and her first husband Gilbert Tailboys. He was named Robert for his father's grandfather Robert Tailboys. His birth came between his elder brother's George's birth in 1524 and his father's death in 1530, therefore at the time of his death in 1542 he was still a minor. His birth was probably towards the end of the marriage since there is so little information known about him.

== Life ==
Robert succeeded his brother George and was the last direct male line of the Tailboys. In his mother's Gower manuscript his signature is one of those that appears.

== Death ==
It has been suggested that Robert Tailboys died from the unhealthy Fen climate. It has been speculated that Robert may have died as a result of consumption. Following his death, his sister Elizabeth inherited the barony.

Peerage of England
Preceded by George Tailboys	Baron Tailboys of Kyme; 1540–1542	Succeeded by Elizabeth Tailboys
