= Henry FitzRoy, Duke of Richmond and Somerset =

Illegitimate son of Henry VIII (1519–1536)

His Grace The Duke of Richmond and Somerset KG
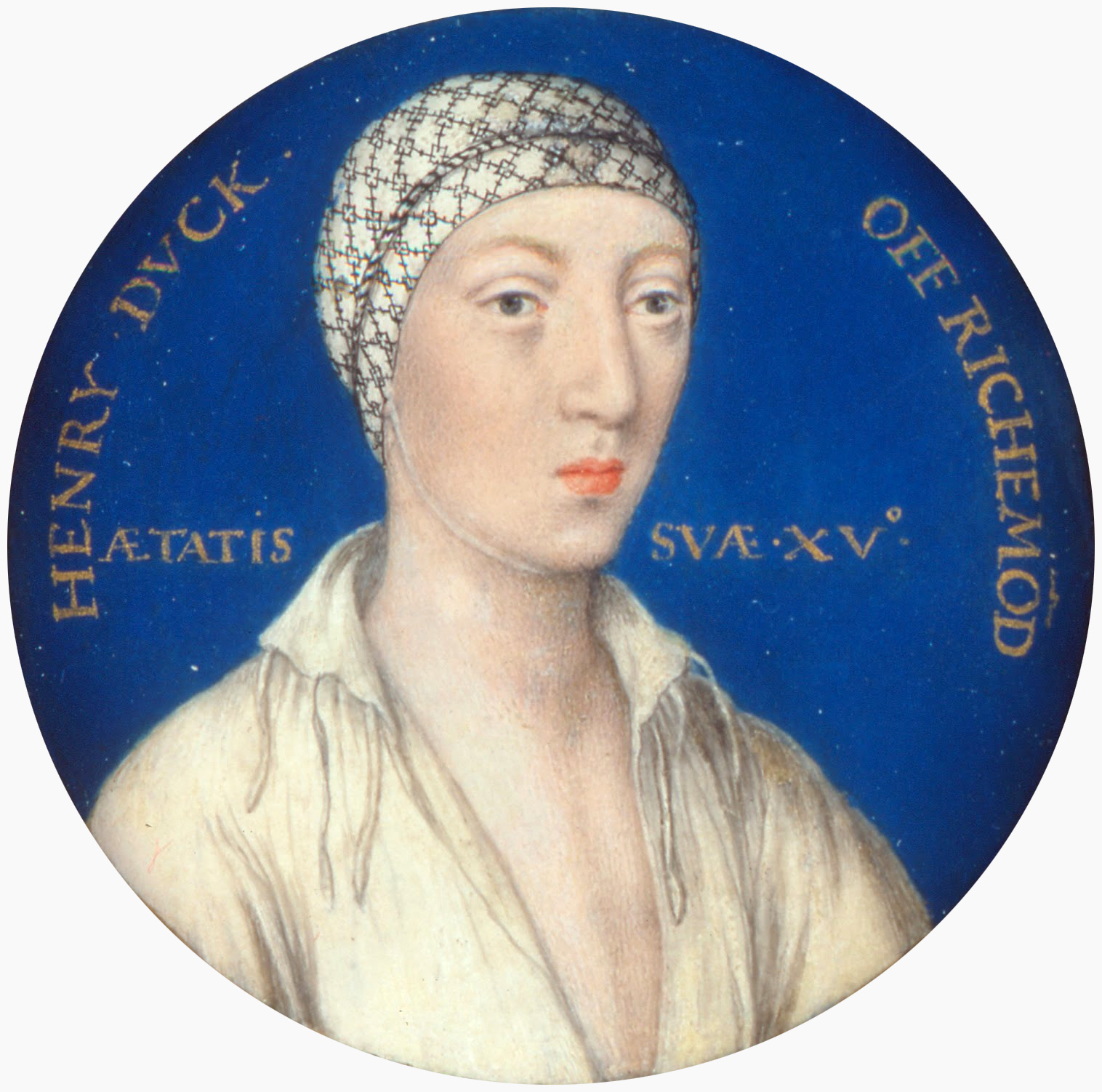
- Portrait miniature, 1533/1534

Lord High Admiral of England
- In office 1525–1536
- Monarch: Henry VIII
- Preceded by: The Duke of Norfolk
- Succeeded by: The Earl of Southampton

Lord Lieutenant of Ireland
- In office 1529–1534
- Preceded by: The Earl of Ossory
- Succeeded by: William Skeffington

Personal details
- Born: c. 15 June 1519 Blackmore, Essex, England
- Died: 23 July 1536 (aged 17) St. James's Palace, London, England
- Resting place: First at Thetford Priory, then at the Church of St Michael the Archangel, Framlingham
- Spouse: Lady Mary Howard
- Parent(s): Henry VIII; Elizabeth Blount

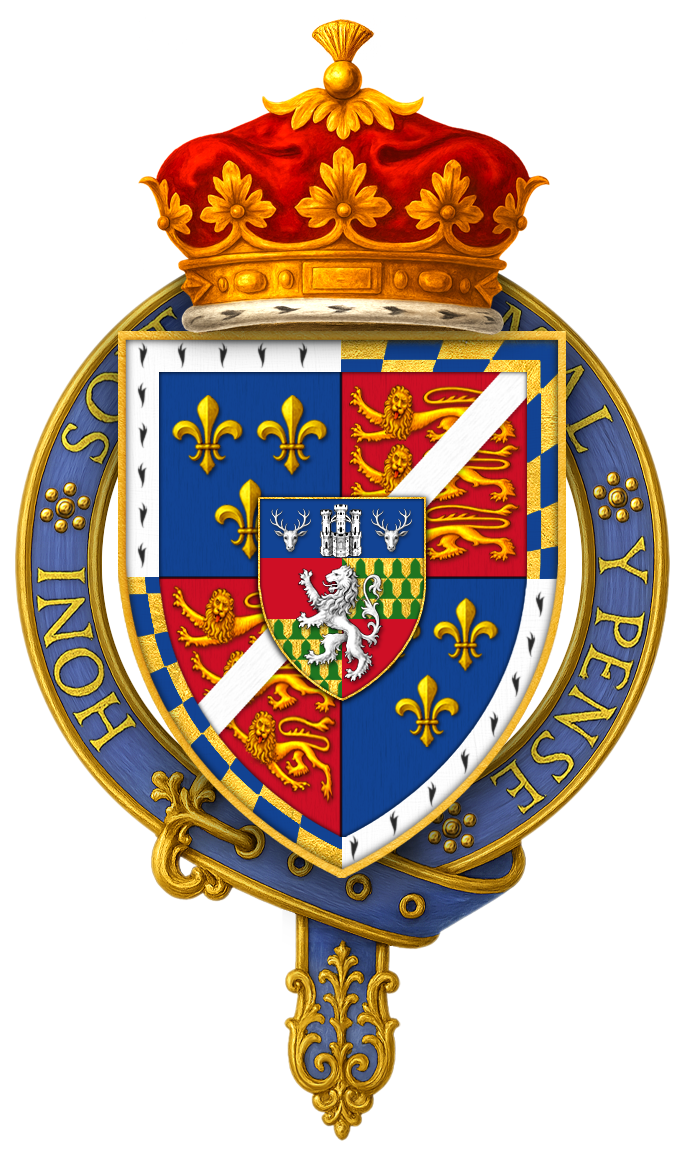
Arms of Sir Henry Fitzroy, KG, at the time of his installation as a knight of the Most Noble Order of the Garter

Henry FitzRoy, Duke of Richmond and Somerset (c. 15 June 1519 – 23 July 1536) was the son of King Henry VIII of England and his mistress Elizabeth Blount, and the only child born out of wedlock whom Henry acknowledged. He was the younger half-brother of Mary I, as well as the older half-brother of Elizabeth I and Edward VI. Through his mother, he was the elder half-brother of Elizabeth, George, and Robert Tailboys. His surname means "son of the king" in Norman French.

== Birth ==
Henry FitzRoy was born in June 1519. His mother was Elizabeth Blount, Catherine of Aragon's lady-in-waiting, and his father was Henry VIII. FitzRoy was conceived when Queen Catherine was approaching her last confinement with another of Henry's children, a stillborn daughter born in November 1518. To avoid scandal, Blount was taken from Henry's court to the Augustinian priory of St Laurence at Blackmore near Ingatestone, in Essex.

FitzRoy's birthdate is often given as 15 June 1519, but the exact date is not known. His birth may have been earlier than predicted. Cardinal Thomas Wolsey was out of London from 9 to 18 June when he reappeared back at court in Windsor. The following day he was expected at Hampton Court, but he did not reappear at a council meeting at Westminster until 29 June. The policy of discretion worked, as the baby boy's arrival caused no great stir, and diplomatic dispatches record nothing of Henry VIII's illegitimate son.

== Christening ==
The christening of the newborn Henry FitzRoy was not recorded even though Cardinal Thomas Wolsey was his godfather and known to have been present at the event. This puts the date of the christening possibly before 29 June when he reappeared at court. The identity of the other godfather is unknown. Although Thomas Howard, 3rd Duke of Norfolk took a great interest in Henry FitzRoy when he was older, in 1519 he was still the heir to the Dukedom of Norfolk, and styled the Earl of Surrey. If Henry had chosen the House of Howard, he would probably have chosen the elder Thomas Howard, who at the time was the 2nd Duke of Norfolk. Another suggestion for the second godfather could be Henry VIII himself, although it was not normal practice for a parent to stand as godparent to his own child: Henry had taken the role of godfather at the christening of his own nephew, Lord Henry Brandon (who was also the son of Henry's closest friend) in March 1516, and his daughter Princess Mary stood godmother to her half-brother Prince Edward in 1537.

== Acknowledgement ==
The infant boy was given the surname FitzRoy to make sure that all knew he was son of the King. Henry VIII openly acknowledged the boy, perhaps because he felt that his lack of a male heir was a slur upon his manhood. At one point he proudly exhibited his newborn son to the court.

== Nursery ==
The boy's upbringing until the moment when he entered Bridewell Palace in June 1525 (six years following his birth) remains shrouded in confusion. Although the boy was illegitimate, this did not mean that young Henry lived remotely from and had no contact with his father. On the contrary, it has been suggested by his biographer, Beverly Murphy, that a letter from a royal nurse implies that FitzRoy had also been part of the royal nursery, and he was often at court after 1530.

In the 16th century, royal and noble households were in a state of constant movement and transition, so it is unlikely that FitzRoy grew up in any one house. He was probably transferred from household to household around London like his royal siblings: Mary, Elizabeth, and Edward. In 1519, the only surviving legitimate child of the King was the three-year-old Princess Mary. In that year her household was reorganised, suggesting that Henry made some provisions for his only son. Margaret Pole, Countess of Salisbury replaced Lady Margaret Bryan as Mistress of Mary's household. At the same time at least two of Mary's carers appear to have left her service.

It is not impossible that Princess Mary's household could have been reorganised some time before her former servants found posts with Henry FitzRoy.

In addition, the correspondence of the child's first known tutor makes it clear that FitzRoy also received some rudimentary education prior to his elevation to the peerage in 1525. John Palsgrave grumbled loudly that Henry had been taught to recite his prayers in a "barbarous" Latin accent and dismissed the man who had instructed him as "no clerk". Although he was more well known from 1525 and onwards, there is some evidence that he was already in receipt of royal favour even before his ennoblement; this comes from a surviving list of "Wardrobe stuff appointed for my lord Henry". The "Lord Henry" in question is not identified but given that the subject was not considered to require a title and that the list has survived with further documents relating to the household established for Henry FitzRoy after his ennoblement, it would seem reasonable to assume that it is Henry FitzRoy. The familiar way in which he is described as "My Lord Henry" is also interesting and suggests that, amongst the officers close to the King, at least, his existence was hardly a secret. Alternatively, he may have been raised in the north with his mother and her husband Gilbert Tailboys, 1st Baron Tailboys of Kyme, and their children.

== Elevation ==
By 1525, the House of Tudor had been on the throne for 40 years. However, cracks were beginning to appear. By the sixteenth year of his reign, 34-year-old Henry still lacked a male heir with his 40-year-old wife Catherine of Aragon. Their only surviving child and heiress was Princess Mary, who at the time was a girl of nine. Henry, though, had another child, an illegitimate one, a sturdy six-year-old son. Although Henry may have had other illegitimate children, Henry FitzRoy was the only one the King acknowledged. Henry VIII was also the only surviving son of Henry VII. Henry had no surviving younger brother nor any close male relations from his father's family who could be called up to share the burden of government in the King's name. As Henry and Catherine's marriage remained without a son, the king's only living son became more attractive for onlookers to observe. The King's chief minister at the time was Cardinal Thomas Wolsey, and since Henry FitzRoy's birth, he had taken an interest in his monarch's only son. In a letter dated June 1525, the Cardinal refers to the King's son: "Your entirely beloved sonne, the Lord Henry FitzRoy".

In 1525, FitzRoy was given his own residence in London, which he was granted by his father: Durham House on the Strand. Since his birth, FitzRoy had remained in the background, although the boy had been brought up in remarkable style and comfort, almost as if he were a prince of the blood and not an acknowledged royal bastard. Such discretion over his son may not have been to the King's taste, and he may have felt his manhood and virility should be publicly demonstrated. He fully made up for his son's quiet birth and equally quiet christening when on 18 June 1525 the six-year-old boy was brought to Bridewell Palace on the western edge of the city of London where honours were showered upon him. That morning of the 18th, the six-year-old Lord Henry FitzRoy travelled by barge from Wolsey's mansion of Durham Place, near Charing Cross, down the River Thames. He came in the company of a host of knights, squires, and other gentlemen. At 9am his barge pulled up at the Watergate and his party made their way through the palace to the king's lodgings on the south side of the second floor. The rooms were richly decorated, with various members of the court and the nobility coming to see FitzRoy's elevation. Among them were numerous bishops, as well as Thomas Howard, 3rd Duke of Norfolk, and the King's brother-in-law, Charles Brandon, 1st Duke of Suffolk. During the first ceremony, when he was created Earl of Nottingham, FitzRoy was attended by Henry Percy, 5th Earl of Northumberland, who carried the sword of state, along with John de Vere, 14th Earl of Oxford, and William FitzAlan, 18th Earl of Arundel. Six-year-old Henry knelt before his father as Sir Thomas More read out the patents of nobility. It was the first time since the 12th century that an illegitimate son had been raised to the peerage, when Henry II had created his son William Earl of Salisbury. However, the ceremony was not yet complete. The onlookers watched as the young Lord Nottingham re-emerged into the chamber. The Earl of Northumberland carried the robes; behind him came Thomas Grey, 2nd Marquess of Dorset, carrying the sword; the Earl of Arundel, carrying the cap of estate with a circlet; and the Earl of Oxford with a rod of gold. Once again young Henry FitzRoy knelt before his father, and as the patent was read he was invested with the trappings of a duke. This time when he rose to his feet he was Duke of Richmond and Somerset.

To be a duke was a significant honour. It was the highest rank of the peerage, and the title, originally devised by Edward III for his son Edward, Prince of Wales as the Duke of Cornwall, retained its royal aura. The former Henry FitzRoy was subsequently referred to in all formal correspondence as the "right high and noble Prince Henry, Duke of Richmond and Somerset". As if to compound this sense of royal dignity and endow the child with as much respectability as possible, Henry VIII had granted his son the unprecedented honour of a double dukedom. While he was mostly known as Richmond, some pains were taken to see that he bore both titles in equal weight. The bulk of FitzRoy's new lands came from Margaret Beaufort's estate. These were lands which were the rightful inheritance of King Henry VII when he was Earl of Richmond and the lands which had belonged to John Beaufort, Duke of Somerset, the father of Margaret Beaufort. The use of the Duchy of Somerset must have struck a chord among the courtiers, as it was well known that the Beauforts' eldest child was John Somerset, a royal bastard who had been legitimised following his parents' adultery and then marriage. A part of the Beaufort connection to the Somerset duchy, the title of Duke of Richmond was important as the earldom of Richmond had been held by his grandfather King Henry VII and by his great-grandfather Edmund Tudor, 1st Earl of Richmond. The earldom of Nottingham had been held by Richmond's great uncle Prince Richard of Shrewsbury, Duke of York, the second son of Edward IV. Seeing Henry's obvious pride and affection for his son, many of those who witnessed FitzRoy's elevation must have wondered if this was what the King had in mind. To support his new status, Henry granted his young son an annuity of £4,845. Following the ceremony, there were "great feasts and disguising". Henry wished to celebrate his six-year-old son with customary extravagance. It is unknown if Elizabeth Blount was present, but it is certain that the new duke's stepfather Gilbert Tailboys, 1st Baron Tailboys of Kyme was present and must have given her an eyewitness account.

It was a proud day for Henry, and for his former mistress Elizabeth; however, the ceremony did nothing to spare the Queen's feelings. She knew she had failed to give England a prince and was anxious about her own daughter's prospects. In a private letter, the Venetian ambassador wrote: "It seems that the Queen resents the earldom and dukedom conferred on the King’s natural son and remains dissatisfied. At the instigation it is said of her three Spanish ladies her chief counsellors, so that the King has dismissed them from court, a strong measure but the Queen was obliged to submit and have patience".

Also at FitzRoy's elevation was Henry Courtenay, 1st Marquess of Exeter, his father's cousin through Catherine of York, the younger sister of Elizabeth of York. He was raised from being merely the Earl of Devon to be the Marquess of Exeter. Sir Thomas Manners, a great nephew of Edward IV through his sister Anne of York was made the earl of Rutland. Henry Clifford was made the new Earl of Cumberland and would cement his ties to the House of Tudor by marrying his son and heir, Lord Henry Clifford, to FitzRoy's cousin, lady Eleanor Brandon, the King's niece. FitzRoy's ceremony was by far the most spectacular but it was also a public relations display, since the last member of the Yorkist faction, Richard de la Pole, lost his life in February of that same year fighting for the French at the Battle of Pavia. The young Henry Brandon became the new Earl of Lincoln, a title which had once belonged to the de la Pole family.

== Crown Offices ==
Arrangements for Henry's care were initially entrusted to Thomas Wolsey and plans for his elevation were already in progress by April 1525. On 7 June that year, he was elected knight of the Garter and was installed on the 25th. On 18 June, he was made Earl of Nottingham and on the same day he received the honour of a double dukedom; those being Richmond and Somerset. As such, he was endowed with lands whose revenues amounted to £4845 in the first year. In that same year, FitzRoy was granted several other appointments, including Lord High Admiral of England, Lord President of the Council of the North, and Warden of the Marches towards Scotland and Governor of Carlisle, the effect of which was to place the government of the north of England in his hands. He held the offices in name only; the power was actually in the hands of a council dominated by Thomas Magnus, Archdeacon of the East Riding.

From then onwards, the Duke was raised like a prince, at Sheriff Hutton Castle in Yorkshire. His father had a particular fondness for him and took great interest in his upbringing. Sir Thomas Tempest was comptroller of his household. In February 1527, Thomas Magnus told the young Duke that King James V of Scotland, FitzRoy's first cousin, had asked for hunting dogs. FitzRoy sent his cousin 20 hunting hounds and a huntsman.

== Kingdom of Ireland ==
On 22 June 1529, FitzRoy was made Lord-Lieutenant of Ireland, and there was a plan to crown him king of that country, though the King's counsellors feared that making a separate Kingdom of Ireland whose ruler was not that of England would create another threat similar to the Kingdom of Scotland. After FitzRoy's death, the Crown of Ireland Act 1542 established a personal union between the English and Irish crowns, providing that whoever was King of England was to be King of Ireland as well. King Henry VIII of England was proclaimed its first holder.

== Living in France ==
In October 1532, Henry VIII travelled to Calais for a meeting with Francis I of France and took FitzRoy with him. As part of the negotiations, FitzRoy joined the French court and lived with the Dauphin Francis and his younger brother, the future King Henry II of France, until August 1533, when he was recalled to England.

== Marriage ==
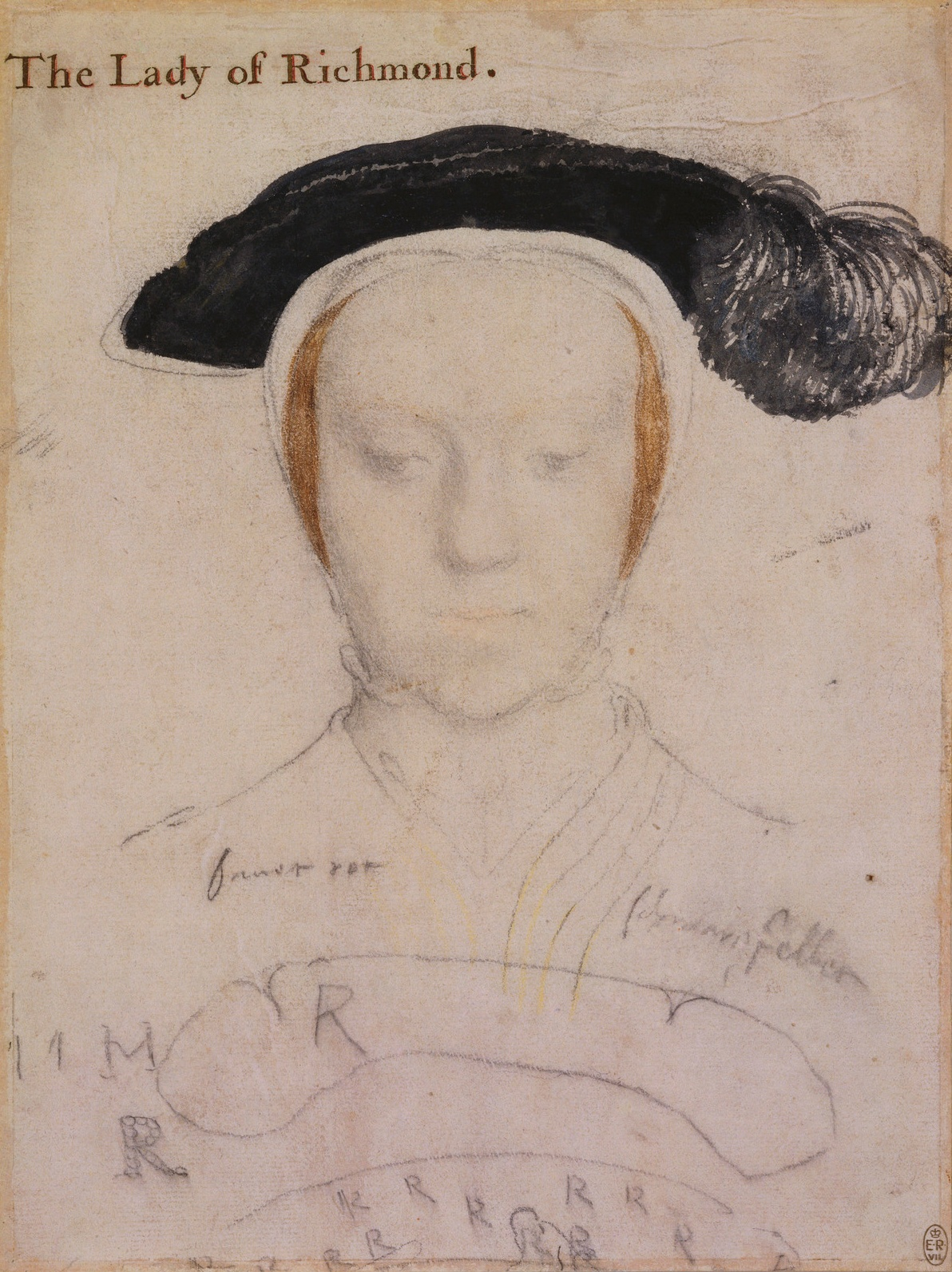
Sketch of the Duchess of Richmond by Hans Holbein the Younger

When Henry VIII began the process of having his marriage to Catherine of Aragon annulled, it was suggested that FitzRoy marry his own half-sister Mary in order to strengthen FitzRoy's claim to the throne. Anxious to prevent the annulment and Henry's possible break with the Roman Catholic Church, the Pope was even prepared to grant a special dispensation for their marriage.

At age 14, on 28 November 1533 FitzRoy instead married Lady Mary Howard, the only daughter of Thomas Howard, 3rd Duke of Norfolk. He was on excellent terms with his brother-in-law, the poet Henry Howard, Earl of Surrey. The marriage was never consummated.

== Possible heir to the throne ==
At the time of FitzRoy's death, the Second Succession Act was going through Parliament which disinherited Henry's daughter Elizabeth as his heir and permitted the king to designate his successor, whether legitimate or not. There is no evidence that Henry intended to proclaim FitzRoy his heir, but the act would have permitted him to do so if he wished. The Imperial ambassador Eustace Chapuys wrote to Charles V, Holy Roman Emperor on 8 July 1536 that Henry VIII had made a statute allowing him to nominate a successor, but thought FitzRoy would not succeed to the throne by it, as he was consumptive and now diagnosed incurable.

== Death ==
FitzRoy's promising career came to an abrupt end in July 1536. According to the chronicler Charles Wriothesley, he became sickly some time before he died, although his biographer Beverley A. Murphy cites his documented public appearances and activities in April and May of that year, without exciting comment on his health. He was reported ill with "consumption" (usually identified as tuberculosis, but possibly another serious lung complaint) in early July, and died at St. James's Palace on 23 July 1536.

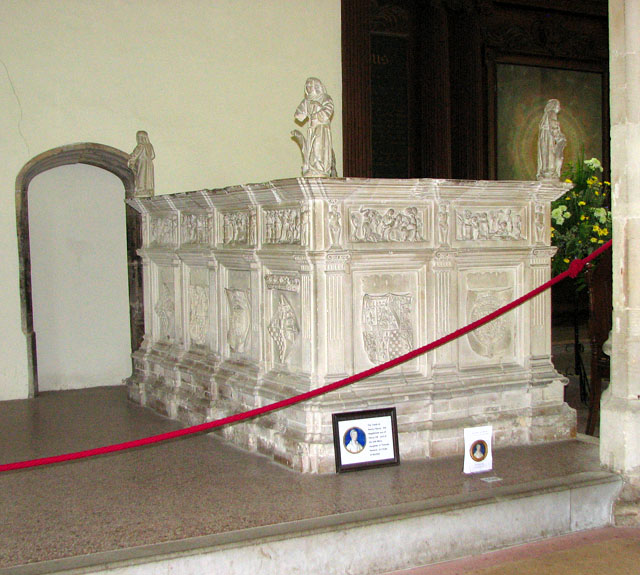
Tomb of Henry FitzRoy, Duke of Richmond and his wife Mary. St Michael the Archangel's Church, Framlingham, Suffolk

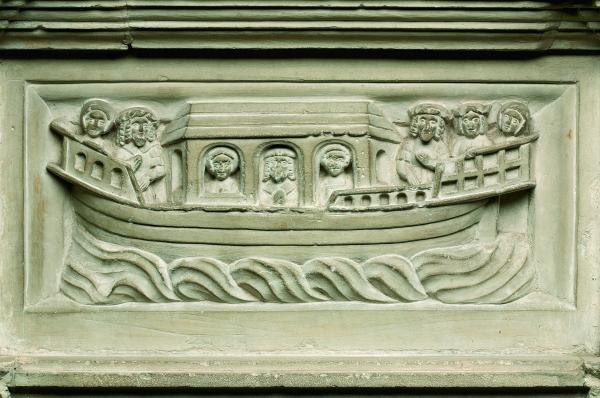
Noah's Ark on the Flood, one of the scenes from the Old Testament in the tomb of the Duke of Richmond

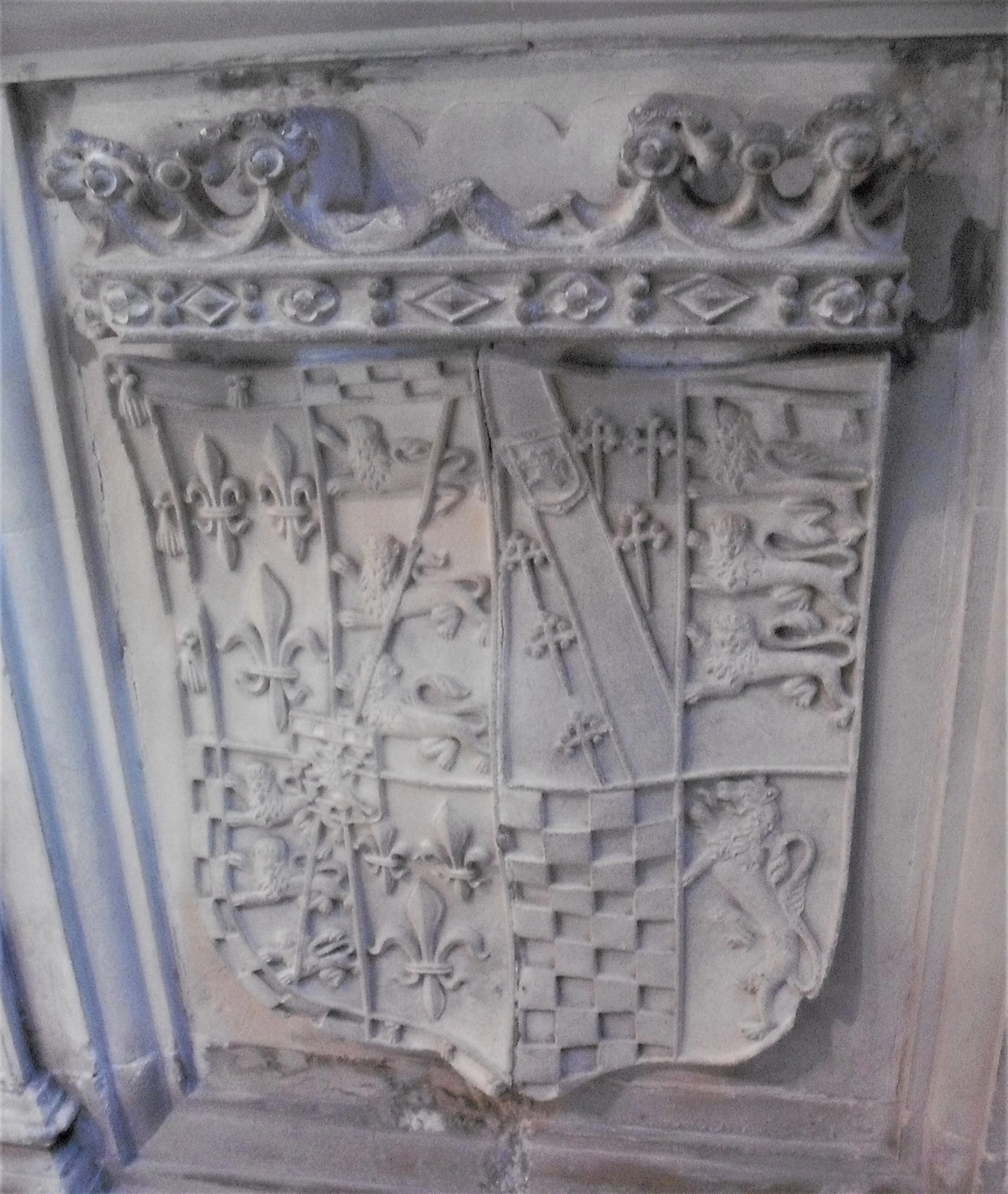
Coat of arms of the Duke of Richmond, combined with the Howard family arms (from his marriage to Lady Mary, daughter of the 3rd Duke of Norfolk) on his tomb in Framlingham Church.

FitzRoy's father-in-law gave orders that the body be wrapped in lead and then taken in a closed cart for secret interment. However, his servants put the body in a straw-filled wagon. The only mourners were two attendants who followed at a distance. FitzRoy was in the first instance buried at Thetford Priory, the burial place and mausoleum of members of the Howard family.

In February 1540, when Thetford Priory was about to be closed, Howard petitioned the King not to close the Priory Church on the grounds that both his first wife Anne of York, FitzRoy's great-aunt, as well as FitzRoy himself were buried there. The request had no effect; at the same time however, the King ordered that the current dissolution of the monasteries be briefly suspended, so that everyone who wished had time to rebury the remains of their relations. Howard moved his son-in-law's grave to the Church of St Michael the Archangel, Framlingham.

FitzRoy's tomb has a mix of royal and religious iconography, with his personal coat of arms surrounded by the collar of the Order of the Garter and the Order's motto "Honi soit qui mal y pense", and the coats of arms of the Howard family (by his marriage to Mary Howard), and friezes showing scenes from the Biblical Old Testament (mainly from the Book of Genesis and part of the Book of Exodus). On the north side are the birth of Eve; God giving the Garden of Eden into the charge of Adam and Eve; the Temptation, and the Expulsion from Paradise. On the west are the nursing of Cain and Abel, and Adam digging to return to Eden; Cain and Abel making their sacrifices (offerings) to God, and Cain killing Abel. On the south side are Noah's Ark in the Flood; the drunkenness of Noah; the Prophet Abraham and the Angels, and Lot escaping from Sodom and Gomorrah. On the east are Abraham and his son Isaac as well as Moses and the Law tables, and the Israelites sacrificing to the Golden Calf.

Near the tomb is the outline of a small door which was the private entrance of noblemen from the Castle.

His father outlived him by just over a decade, and was succeeded by his legitimate son, Edward VI, born shortly after FitzRoy's death. It is said that Henry FitzRoy might have been made king had Henry VIII died without a legitimate son:

Well was it for them (Note: i.e. Mary and Elizabeth, Henry VIII's daughters.) that Henry Fitzroy his natural son [...] was dead, otherwise (some suspect) had he survived King Edward the Sixth, we might presently have heard of a King Henry the Ninth, so great was his father's affection and so unlimited his power to prefer him.

— Thomas Fuller

On her death in December 1557, his wife, Mary Howard, was buried along with FitzRoy.

== Notes ==
=== Works cited ===
- Everett Green, Mary Anne (1852). Lives of the Princesses of England. Vol. 3. London: Longman, Brown, Green, Longman and Robers. pp. 1–14.
- Panton, James (2011). Historical Dictionary of the British Monarchy. Scarecrow Press. ISBN 978-0-810-87497-8.
- Weir, Alison (2011). Britain's Royal Families: The Complete Genealogy. Random House. ISBN 978-1-446-44911-0.

Political offices
| Preceded by The Duke of Norfolk | Lord High Admiral; 1525–1536 | Succeeded by The Earl of Southampton |
| Preceded by The Earl of Ossory as Lord Deputy | Lord Lieutenant of Ireland; 1529–1534 | Succeeded by Sir William Skeffington as Lord Deputy |
| Preceded by The Viscount Rochford | Lord Warden of the Cinque Ports; 1536 | Succeeded by Sir Thomas Cheney |
