= Bier Hoi Brewing Company =

Beer production company in Vietnam

Logo of the Bier Hoi Brewing Company

Bier Hoi Brewing Company is a beer and wine company based in Vietnam. It mainly produces lager-style beer in Vietnam for export to foreign markets, notably Australia.

The company first produced beer for the Woolworths Group in 330 mL cans (4.3% ABV). It currently produces 500 mL "Tall Boy" cans (4.5% ABV) for the Coles Group.
