= Elizabeth Tailboys, 4th Baroness Tailboys of Kyme =

English noblewoman

Elizabeth Tailboys
- Baroness Tailboys of Kyme
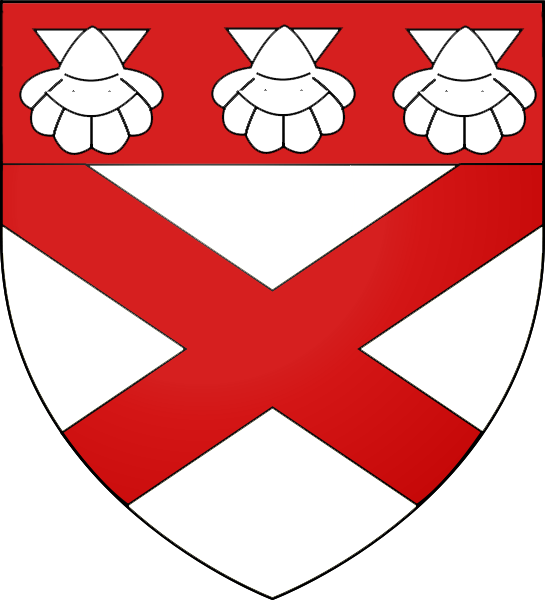
- Born: c. 1520
- Died: c. April 1563 (aged c.43)
- Buried: Unknown
- Spouses: Thomas Wymbish; Ambrose Dudley, 3rd Earl of Warwick
- Parents: Gilbert, 1st Baron Tailboys; Elizabeth Blount

Elizabeth Tailboys, 4th Baroness Tailboys of Kyme (c. 1520 – c. April 1563) was the daughter of Elizabeth Blount and Gilbert Tailboys, 1st Baron Tailboys of Kyme, and the second wife of Ambrose Dudley, 3rd Earl of Warwick. Through her mother she was a half-sister of Henry FitzRoy, Duke of Richmond and Somerset, the only illegitimate child acknowledged by Henry VIII, King of England.

== Early life ==
Elizabeth was the only known daughter of Sir Gilbert Tailboys and his wife, also Elizabeth (née Blount). She and two younger brothers, George and Robert, survived their father after his death in 1530, when Elizabeth was around nine years old. She also had a half-brother from her mother's former relationship with Henry VIII: Henry FitzRoy, who was a year or two older than her. There is some debate over her true paternity. She was born around 1520 so some historians posit she was another child of Henry VIII.

== First marriage ==
Elizabeth was married to Thomas Wymbish, and they lived in Nocton, Lincolnshire. Thomas had been a ward of the crown, after his guardian John, Lord Hussey was executed, and in 1539, Henry VIII gave Thomas's wardship and marriage to Elizabeth's stepfather Edward Clinton, 1st Earl of Lincoln. Thomas had been betrothed to Lord Hussey's daughter Dorothy, but this was broken to ensure the marriage of Thomas to Elizabeth could take place.

Elizabeth and her husband had an unhappy marriage, with little love between them. Henry VIII visited Elizabeth and her husband at Nocton on his northern progress in 1541. He seemed interested in protecting the rights of his late son's half-sister. Elizabeth inherited the Tailboys estates after her brothers George and Robert died, and she was thus the fourth Baroness Tailboys of Kyme. Her husband, a member of the gentry, petitioned to have himself be named as Lord Tailboys; however, with a bad relationship with her husband, Elizabeth wanted the title for herself and Henry VIII ruled in favour of his former mistress's daughter. His judges agreed that as long as the marriage was childless, Thomas could not have his wife's titles.

While their marital problems continued they were associated together in the last years of Henry's reign, signing documents and jointly petitioning the crown regarding property. Thomas never got the barony he wanted, through marriage or his own merits, and the last was not heard regarding his and his wife's problems; on 13 June 1550 the Privy Council meeting was called up to intervene in a "Domestic Quarrel", the details of which are unknown. In 1551 Elizabeth was left a ring in the will of Sir Charles Brandon, the illegitimate son of Charles Brandon, 1st Duke of Suffolk. Thomas wrote his will two years later, leaving Elizabeth only a life interest in his lands as agreed at the time of their marriage. His gifts to Elizabeth were small and he left most of what he had to his mother, sisters, and brother-in-law.

== Second marriage ==
In early 1553, Elizabeth married for the second time, to Ambrose Dudley, a younger son of the Duke of Northumberland, then Lord President of the Council and de facto regent for King Edward VI. After Edward's death and Northumberland's attempt to place his daughter-in-law Lady Jane Grey on the throne, Ambrose was imprisoned with his father and brothers.

In late 1554, Elizabeth commissioned Roger Ascham to write a Latin petition to Queen Mary I and her husband Philip of Spain, seeking pardon for Ambrose. Eager to win over their new English subjects, Mary and Philip agreed; four months later Elizabeth sent another letter thanking Philip for freeing her husband.

She died in April 1563 while Ambrose was in France. The barony became extinct upon her death, and all of her lands passed to her father's sisters and their families.

Peerage of England
Preceded by Robert Tailboys	Baron Tailboys of Kyme; 1543–1563	Extinct
