= George Tailboys, 2nd Baron Tailboys of Kyme =

English nobleman (c. 1523–1540)

George Tailboys
- Baron Tailboys of Kyme
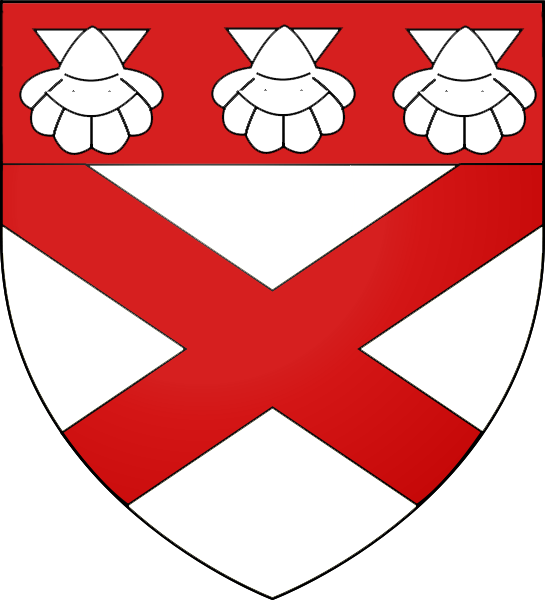
- Born: c. 1523
- Died: 6 September 1540 (aged c.17)
- Buried: Unknown
- Spouse: Margaret Skipwith
- Parents: Gilbert Tailboys, 1st Baron Tailboys of Kyme; Elizabeth Blount

George Tailboys (c. 1523 – c. 6 September 1540) was the eldest son of Elizabeth Blount and Gilbert Tailboys, 1st Baron Tailboys of Kyme. Through his mother he was the half brother of Henry FitzRoy, 1st Duke of Richmond and Somerset, who was the only illegitimate offspring acknowledged by Henry VIII, King of England.

== Birth ==
George's birth date is unknown, as is the date or year of his parents' marriage. On 25 March 1539, George was stated to have been sixteen years old. This would mean that he was born between April 1522 and March 1523. He was named George for his paternal grandfather Sir George Tailboys.

== Siblings ==
George, as the heir of his father, was the eldest surviving son. The evidence of Gilbert and Elizabeth's children are obscure; they seem to have had five or six. In 1805 when the church of South Kyme, Lincolnshire, was being rebuilt, the vaults containing Gilbert's tomb were opened. Four lead coffins were found inside, below the monument erected by Elizabeth Blount: these contained a fully grown adult and three children. One of the coffins was opened by the workmen and they found it to contain a child aged around five or six. The body was well preserved and looked as if the child had only recently died. In one of the coffins, a body could be that of Robert Tailboys, 3rd Baron Tailboys of Kyme, who died in March 1542 aged about 14. George, who died at 16 or 17, was unlikely to have been buried with his father.

The siblings who survived their father were George's elder sister was Elizabeth, and one known younger brother Robert, who succeeded him following his short life. On Robert's death the barony passed to their elder sister Elizabeth, who lived until the reign of Elizabeth I and became the wife of Ambrose Dudley, 3rd Earl of Warwick.

George's mother remarried a few years after the death of her husband Gilbert. Her new husband was Edward Clinton or Fiennes, 1st Earl of Lincoln, 9th Baron Clinton, and through him George gained three half-sisters, Margaret, Catherine and Bridget.

== Henry FitzRoy ==
His elder half brother Henry FitzRoy was around four years older than him, and Richmond would only have his maternal brothers, as he would die before the birth of his royal half brother Edward VI, King of England. George seems to have built a friendship with his royal brother, suggesting that the two brothers were brought up together; perhaps when their mother would visit Richmond at Sheriff Hutton Castle, George would go too. George received royal hand-me-down's of Richmond's fine clothing. In the 1531 inventory of Richmond's possessions, his clothing was given to George. On 3 August 1533, on the orders of the Duke of Norfolk, Richmond's guardian, clothes including a gown of purple taffeta, edged with purple velvet and with buttons of gold decorated with roses were passed along to George. On the same day he also received a gown of blue tinsel, lined with black satin and edged with black velvet. Other garments included a doublet of gold. Richmond also thought of his maternal family in the last weeks of his life. In an inventory taken following his death, it was recorded that he had given his half-brother George more clothing and it had been delivered by Richmond's personal attendant and friend, George Cotton. Richmond died in July 1536 when George was around thirteen.

== Guardian ==
On 15 April 1530, George's father Gilbert Tailbois died when George was about seven years of age. George's wardship was a valuable commodity, and it was granted to William FitzWilliam, 1st Earl of Southampton who would become Lord High Admiral after the death of Richmond. Southampton took his ward with him to Calais, George being there on 13 December at the reception of Anne of Cleves. Southampton was a childless man and seems to have been fond of his ward; when George died in September 1540 he wrote to Henry in a letter dated 6 September: Thus having no other news to signify, but that your majesty hath lost a great treasure in my lord Tailbois, whom, if worldly goodness would have preserved, would to God, I had bestowed and spent all I have wonder your grace in this world to have him a life, for in my opinion a more toward and likely gentleman to have done your majesty service had ye not within your realm but the will of God must be fulfilled.

== Adolescence ==
In July 1536, when he was thirteen and in the same year as his brother Henry died, George took his seat in parliament for the first time as Lord Tailboys of Kyme. His mother did not hold his wardship though it seems he sometimes remained in her care. In February 1537 when George was about fourteen, he and his mother received a joint grant of the office of bailiff of the manor of Tattershall Castle, near South Kyme. They were also appointed as keepers of the great park and chaser there and other areas within the manorial estate. By the late 1530s George was granted more autonomy in his own affairs, with a report made to the king of the strategically important, but dilapidated, Harbottle Castle, recommending that George should either be compelled to repair the castle or that the king should take it into his own hands and pay the young lord compensation.

== Marriage ==
Since his wardship was in the hands of his guardian Southampton, it is doubtful that Elizabeth Blount played a role in arranging the match between her son and Margaret Skipwith. Furthermore, Elizabeth died at some point between February 1539 and January 1540 and probably never saw her second son marry. The bride was chosen to be Margaret Skipwith, a cousin of Southampton's, and the daughter of Sir William Skipwith, a Lincolnshire gentleman. Writing to Arthur Plantagenet, 1st Viscount Lisle in January 1538, John Husee reports court gossip regarding George's future bride. My lord of Wiltshire is again now in the court and very well entertained. The election lieth betwixt Mrs Mary Shelton and Mrs Margaret Skipwith. I pray Jesu send such one as may be for his highness comfort and the wealth of the realm. Herein I doubt not but your lordship will keep his silence till the matter be surely known.

Muriel St Clare Byrne, in her commentary in relation to this letter suggested that Henry was casting an appreciative eye on both ladies, evidently to make one of them either his mistress or perhaps, his wife. However, by 17 April 1539, Sir Thomas Heneage, an uncle of Margaret, wrote to Cromwell informing him that the King had given his consent to the match between young George and Margaret. John Husee wrote again to his master on 26 April 1539, that It hath been shrewd me that Mrs Skipwith shall marry the Lord Tailbois. This is shall please your lordship to keep secret till you hear more. The reasons for secrecy, or even Lord Lisle's interest in the match, is unclear, particularly as on 15 May 1539, Husee deemed it important enough to inform Lady Lisle that the lord Tailbois is married with no further comment.

Only being 16 and not yet into his majority, an Act of Parliament was passed to put him in possession of his estates and enable him to settle a jointure on his wife. As a minor George had no control of his property, something that was recited by a private Act of a dower on his wife at the humble suit, petition, and special instance of the said Earl [of Southampton], and also for the good and faithful service that the said Gilbert the late Lord Tailbois and his ancestors hath done unto his highness and his progenitors. It was an unusual act, closely resembling the one his father once had following his marriage to George's mother, Henry's discarded mistress. The King and Southampton had no need to relinquish control of George's property for another five years. It is therefore probable that Margaret Skipwith had been Henry's mistress, and George was in a similar position to his father Gilbert.

== Death ==
George did not long survive his marriage, dying, like his royal half-brother Henry, in his late teens, in September 1540. Their mother was most likely not alive at the time of his death. It has been speculated that George may have died as a result of consumption. Given that he had been well enough to travel to Calais at the end of 1539, his was not a long-term illness.

Peerage of England
Preceded by Gilbert Tailboys	Baron Tailboys of Kyme; 1530–1540	Succeeded by Robert Tailboys
