= Ambrose Dudley, 3rd Earl of Warwick =

English nobleman and general

The Right Honourable The Earl of Warwick KG PC
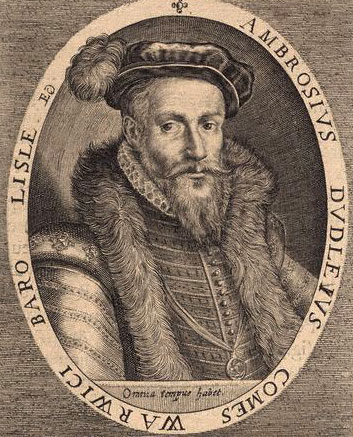
- Engraving by Willem de Passe, 1620, after an earlier portrait
- Tenure: 1561–1590
- Other titles: Baron Lisle
- Born: c. 1530
- Died: 21 February 1590; London
- Buried: Collegiate Church of St Mary, Warwick
- Residence: Warwick Castle, Warwickshire; North Hall, Northaw, Hertfordshire
- Locality: West Midlands
- Wars and battles: Kett's Rebellion; Campaign against Mary Tudor, 1553; Battle of St. Quentin, 1557; Newhaven Campaign, 1562–1563; Rising of the North
- Offices: Master of the Ordnance; Privy Councillor
- Spouses: Anne Whorwood; Elizabeth Tailboys, 4th Baroness Tailboys; Anne Russell
- Parents: John Dudley, 1st Duke of Northumberland; Jane Guildford
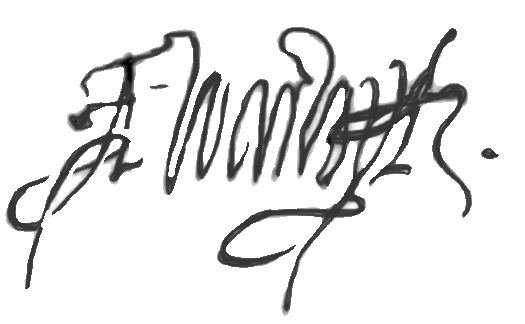
- Signature

Ambrose Dudley, 3rd Earl of Warwick (c. 1530 – 21 February 1590) was an English nobleman and general, and an elder brother of Queen Elizabeth I's favourite, Robert Dudley, Earl of Leicester. Their father was John Dudley, 1st Duke of Northumberland, who led the English government from 1550-1553 under King Edward VI and unsuccessfully tried to establish Lady Jane Grey on the English throne after the King's death in July 1553. For his participation in this venture, Ambrose Dudley was imprisoned in the Tower of London and condemned to death. Reprieved, his rehabilitation came after he fought for King Philip in the Battle of St. Quentin.

On Queen Elizabeth's accession in November 1558, Dudley was appointed Master of the Ordnance, in which capacity he was to unofficially assist William the Silent in his struggle against Spain by delivering English weaponry. As the senior member of his family, Dudley was created Earl of Warwick in December 1561. In 1562–1563 he commanded the army Elizabeth sent to Le Havre to garrison the town and assist the Huguenots in the First French War of Religion. This campaign ended in failure when the French belligerents agreed to a peace and the English surrendered because of the plague which was decimating their ranks. Dudley, who had acted honorably throughout, returned with a severe leg wound which was to hinder his further career and ultimately led to his death 27 years later. His last military engagement was against the Northern rebels in 1569. From 1573 he served as a privy councillor.

Despite being married three times, Ambrose Dudley had no surviving children; an infant daughter died in 1552. This had serious repercussions for the survival of his dynasty, since his only surviving brother, Robert, equally died without legitimate issue. With him, Ambrose Dudley had a very close relationship, and in business and personal life they did many things together. Like Robert Dudley, Ambrose was a major patron of the Elizabethan Puritan movement and supported non-conforming preachers in their struggle with the Church authorities. Due to his homely way of life — and in contrast to the colourful Earl of Leicester — Ambrose Dudley became known to posterity as the "Good Earl of Warwick".

== Youth ==
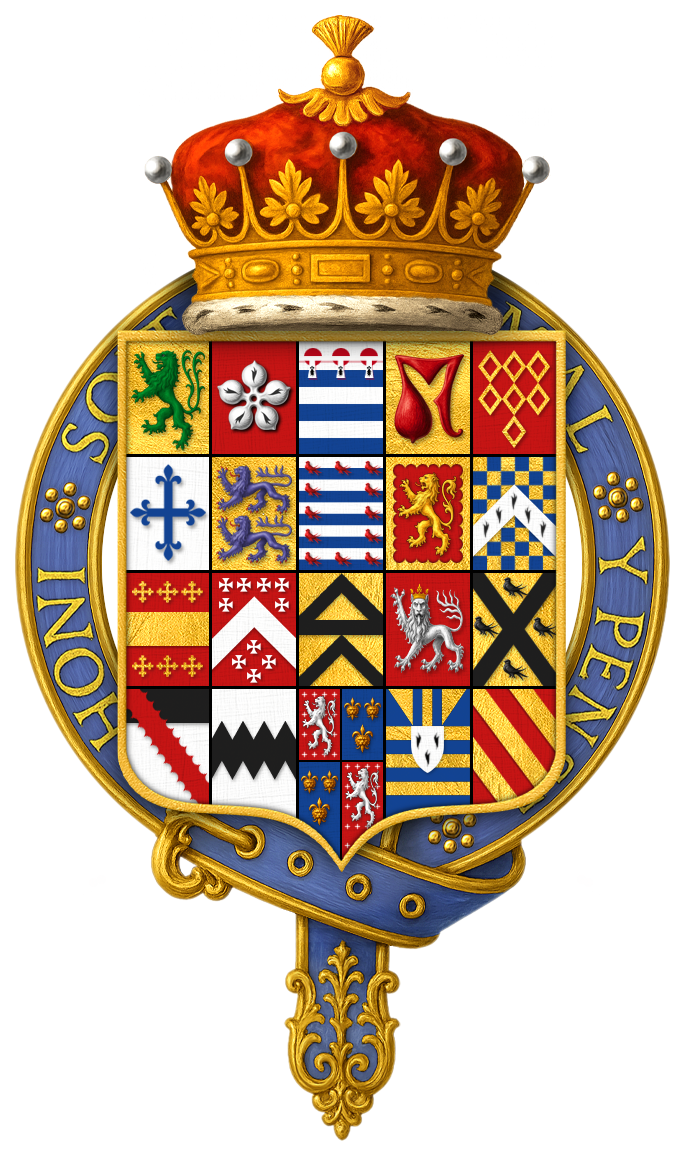
Quartered arms of Ambrose Dudley, Earl of Warwick

Ambrose Dudley was the fourth son of Sir John Dudley, later Viscount Lisle, Earl of Warwick and Duke of Northumberland, and his wife Jane Guildford. The Dudleys had 13 children in all and were known for their Protestant leanings as well as for their happy family life. Ambrose Dudley and his brothers were trained by, among others, the mathematician John Dee and the rhetorician Thomas Wilson. In August 1549, Dudley went to Norfolk with his father and his younger brother Robert to fight against the rebel peasant army of Robert Kett. Back in London, Dudley was knighted and married Anne Whorwood, daughter of William Whorwood, deceased Attorney-General. In 1552, they had a daughter who died soon. Anne also died in 1552, of the sweating sickness. Dudley soon married for the second time: Elizabeth, Lady Tailboys (or Talboys, 1520–1563), who was a baroness in her own right with large possessions in Lincolnshire and Yorkshire.

After the death of King Edward VI on 6 July 1553, John Dudley, Duke of Northumberland, who had led the young king's government for the last three and a half years, tried to install his daughter-in-law Lady Jane Grey on the English throne; she was the King's Protestant cousin to whom Edward had willed the Crown, bypassing his half-sisters Mary and Elizabeth. When Mary Tudor asserted her right to the throne, an expedition against her base in East Anglia became inevitable. Northumberland marched on 14 July, accompanied by his eldest sons, John and Ambrose. Five days later the Privy Council changed sides; on hearing this on 20 July, Northumberland, who had been staying at Cambridge, gave up and was arrested with his party the next day.

Ambrose Dudley was imprisoned in the Tower of London with his father and his four brothers. All were attainted and condemned to death, but only the Duke and Guildford Dudley, the second youngest brother, were executed. After the natural death of John, the eldest brother, in October 1554, Ambrose Dudley was the family's heir; he remained longest in the Tower, being released late in 1554 after a plea by his wife, Lady Tailboys. On the whole, the brothers' release was brought about by their mother and their brother-in-law Henry Sidney, who successfully lobbied the Spanish nobles around Queen Mary I's new husband and co-ruler, Philip of Spain. Out of prison, in December 1554 or January 1555, Ambrose and Robert Dudley took part in one of several tournaments held by Philip to celebrate Anglo-Spanish friendship.

Also in January 1555, Dudley's mother died, leaving him her lands, which Queen Mary allowed him to inherit despite his attainder. However, the Dudley brothers were only welcome at court as long as King Philip was there; later in 1555 they were even ordered out of London and the next year, in the wake of a conspiracy by their second cousin Sir Henry Dudley, the French ambassador Antoine de Noailles reported that the government was seeking to apprehend "the children of the Duke of Northumberland", who were said to be on the run. By January 1557, the brothers were raising personal contingents in order to fight for Philip, now also King of Spain. Ambrose, Robert, and Henry Dudley joined the Spanish forces in France and took part in the Battle of St Quentin, where Henry Dudley was killed. For these services, the two surviving brothers were restored in blood by Act of Parliament in 1558. The cost of the campaign almost bankrupted Ambrose Dudley and his wife, however, so that they had to reduce their household significantly.

== Serving Elizabeth I ==
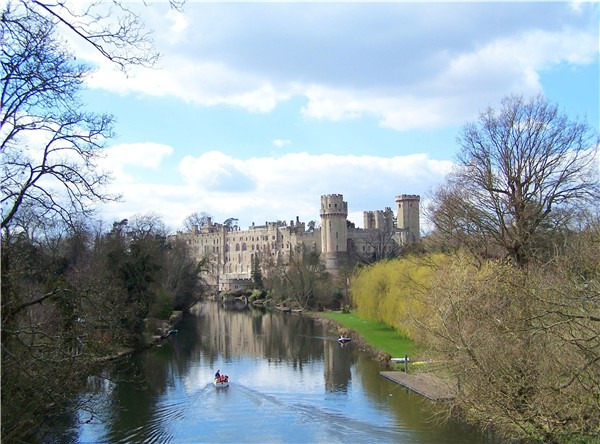
Warwick Castle, the ancient seat of the Earls of Warwick. Ambrose Dudley welcomed Queen Elizabeth at the castle in 1572.

With the accession of Elizabeth I in November 1558, Robert Dudley came into great favour and was made Master of the Horse. Ambrose Dudley received the post of Master of the Ordnance, though he pressed his influential brother to delay the appointment somewhat, so that he could not be held accountable for his predecessor's embezzlement of funds. When their attainder had been lifted in 1558, the Dudley brothers had renounced any rights to their father's possessions or titles. Yet on 25 and 26 December 1561, Ambrose Dudley was created Baron Lisle and Earl of Warwick, and the next year received a large portion of the lands confiscated from the Duke of Northumberland. Warwick Castle—which the Queen visited on her 1572 summer progress—became his seat, while the neighbouring Kenilworth Castle became that of Robert Dudley. Like their father, Ambrose and Robert Dudley adopted the bear and ragged staff, the heraldic device of the medieval Earls of Warwick.

In 1562 the First War of Religion started in France, and Elizabeth was under pressure from her Protestant councillors to help the Huguenots. These were in possession of Le Havre, which was besieged by the Roman Catholic Duke of Guise, and the Huguenots offered it to the English in return for military help—later, they promised, they would exchange it for Calais, which England had lost to France only in 1558. Elizabeth agreed to send 6,000 men to garrison Le Havre. Ambrose Dudley was chosen to lead the expedition, in place of Robert Dudley, whom Elizabeth would not let go despite his strong desire to do so.

Warwick arrived at Le Havre in late October 1562. He was sceptical from the start as to the chances of holding the town, writing: "I fear [you] are too much abused in the good opinion you have in the strength of this town". Elizabeth soon made it clear that she did not wish the English army to engage in any active support for the Huguenot side, the purpose of the English contribution remaining somewhat obscure. In March 1563, the warring French agreed to a peace, while Elizabeth decided to hold on to Le Havre until Calais was returned to the English, as had been agreed with the Huguenot party. The reconciled French, however, turned jointly against the English garrison. Le Havre's fortifications would have needed major expansion and repair to withstand a prolonged siege. Still, Dudley tried his best until the town's walls were crumbling under French bombardment. The Queen permitted him to surrender honourably in July 1563 on account of the plague that was decimating his troops. Ambrose Dudley himself had been shot in the leg when parleying with the French and returned to England seriously ill. He wrote to his brother that he was happy "rather to end my life upon the breach than in any sickness... Farewell my dear and loving brother, a thousand times." Robert Dudley went to welcome him at Portsmouth despite the plague and much to Elizabeth's annoyance.

Politically, the expedition had been a disaster, yet Warwick gained recognition for his leadership since morale had been high and the civilian population had been treated with unusual respect. The Earl's rewards were the Welsh lordship of Ruthin and the Order of the Garter, which was awarded to him while still in France in April 1563. His war injury—which never properly healed—made him ineligible for posts like Lord President of the Council of the North or Lord Deputy of Ireland when they were suggested for him in the future. Elizabeth Lady Tailboys had also died while her husband was in France, and on 11 November 1565 Ambrose Dudley married for the third time. His bride was the 16-year-old Anne Russell, daughter of Francis Russell, 2nd Earl of Bedford. Robert Dudley, meanwhile Earl of Leicester, had arranged the match. It was an extraordinary court event. In between tournaments and banquets, the bride was given away by the Earl of Leicester in the presence of the Queen; she later became one of Elizabeth's closest friends.

In November 1569, the Northern Rebellion broke out with the aim to install Mary, Queen of Scots (who was in English captivity) on the English throne. The Earl of Warwick was one of the commanders appointed to march against the revolt, which was disintegrating rapidly, though. Due to his bad health, Warwick was soon allowed to return to his Midlands estates. In January 1570, Robert, Earl of Leicester, saw his reconvalescent brother at Kenilworth and reported to Elizabeth: "all this hard weather [he] hath every day travelled on horse, Your Majesty's service hath made him forget his pain... assuredly he is marvellous weary, though in my judgment it hath done his body much good".

As Master of the Ordnance, Warwick presided over an increasingly important government department, which centrally managed the storage and commissioning of the state's artillery, munitions, and small arms. Prince William of Orange valued English cannons, and Warwick—who fervently believed in the international Protestant cause—seems willingly to have supplied him with what he wanted. The Spanish ambassador officially protested against this practice in 1576, since the weapons would have been used against Spanish rule in the Netherlands. In 1573 Warwick was admitted to the Privy Council. His attendance to business was quite regular until it declined sharply due to his deteriorating health in the 1580s. At the 1587 trial of Mary Stuart, he acted as a commissioner and was asked by the Scottish Queen to plead for her with his brother, the absent Earl of Leicester. The day sentence was pronounced on her, Warwick did not attend.

One of Warwick's last appointments, in January 1588, was Keeper of the Queen's parks at Grafton Regis with the lawns, chases, and walks.

== Private nobleman ==
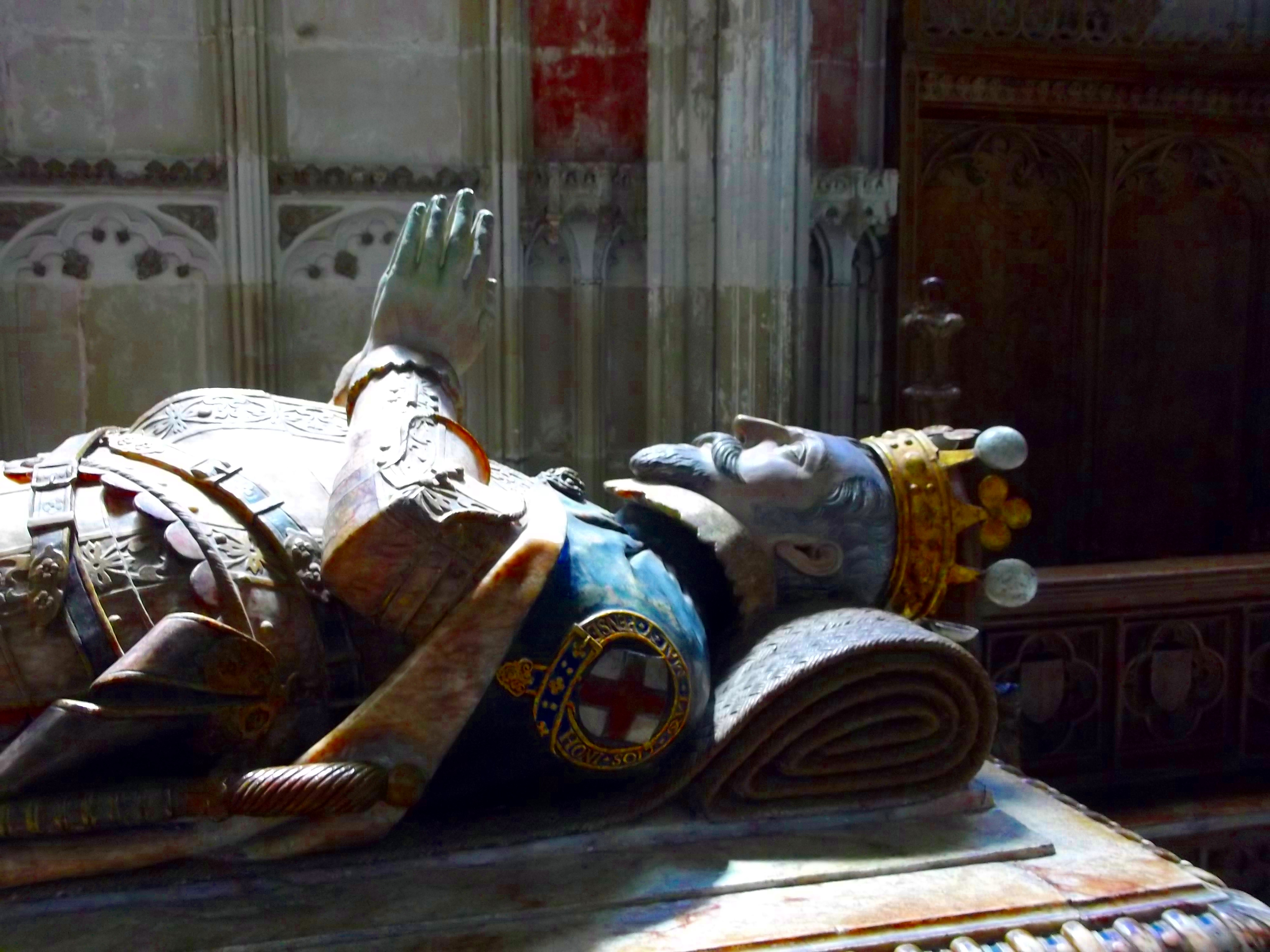
Funeral effigy of Ambrose Dudley in the Beauchamp Chapel of Collegiate Church of St Mary, Warwick

Ambrose Dudley became one of the leading patrons of moderate Puritanism, the principal concern of which was the furtherance of preaching. Discouraged by the official Church, this was largely dependent on private initiatives by influential noblemen. In 1567, the two Dudley earls, together with local gentry, founded a consortium which provided for "the preachers of the Gospel in the county of Warwick." Ambrose Dudley also helped the preacher John Field when he got into trouble over a subversive book he had published in 1565; and when he was imprisoned in 1572, Leicester and Warwick worked his transfer into comfortable confinement in a London alderman's house before he was released altogether by his patrons' means. Like his brother, Ambrose Dudley invested in exploration and privateering voyages; in Martin Frobisher's 1576 search for the Northwest Passage, he was the principal patron, although he contributed only the relatively modest sum of £50.

The two Dudley brothers were on the closest personal terms and Ambrose said of Robert: "there is no man [that] knoweth his doings better than I myself", while Robert's recurrent phrase about Ambrose was: "him I love as myself". Elizabeth, who liked Warwick, loved to joke that he was neither as graceful nor as handsome as his brother—and stouter as well. Lacking a grand London residence of his own, Warwick had his suite of rooms in the palatial Leicester House: "the Lord of Warwick's bedchamber, the Lord of Warwick's closet, the Lord of Warwick's dining parlour". In the administration of their lands, the brothers shared their estate managers and lawyers, while their local affinities consisted of the same gentry families. Privately, they were "almost inseparable", passing time together whenever possible. When Robert Dudley had incurred the Queen's wrath while serving in the Netherlands as Governor-General in 1586, Ambrose wrote to him: "if I were you... I would go to the furthest part of Christendom rather than ever come into England again... Let me have your best advice what is best for me to do, for that I mean to take such part as you do."

After his first marriage, Ambrose Dudley remained childless. His second wife, Elizabeth Tailboys, suffered a phantom pregnancy in 1555. Anne Russell, though nearly 20 years her husband's junior, turned out to be a congenial partner. Through their paternal grandmother the Dudley brothers descended from the famous 15th century earls, John Talbot, 1st Earl of Shrewsbury, and Richard Beauchamp, Earl of Warwick. The Beauchamp descent especially—which was represented by the earldom of Warwick—filled them with pride. Ambrose's childlessness deeply concerned the widowed Robert Dudley, who for many years dared not to remarry for fear of the Queen's displeasure, and eventually died without direct heirs himself in September 1588. Most of Leicester's estate—and debts—passed on to Warwick and encumbered his remaining lifetime. He also took care of his deceased brother's illegitimate teenage son Robert, who was his godson and whom Leicester had willed to inherit after Warwick's death.

From the 1570s the Earl of Warwick often resided at North Hall, his house in Northaw, Hertfordshire. He travelled little as he was often unable to move about, having "no use of his legs". At the end of January 1590, he finally had his gangrenous leg amputated; as a consequence, he died at Bedford House in the Strand, London, on 21 February. Two days before, the diplomat Sir Edward Stafford visited him and described his spasms and pain "which lasted him unto his death". He also saw the Countess sitting "by the fire so full of tears that she could not speak". The Earl of Warwick was buried in the Beauchamp Chapel of Collegiate Church of St Mary, Warwick, in the vicinity of his ancestor Richard Beauchamp, his brother Robert, and his little nephew Robert Dudley, Lord Denbigh, Leicester's son who during his short life had been heir to both Dudley earldoms. Ambrose Dudley's widow commissioned his monument, but on her request was buried with her ancestors in Chenies, Buckinghamshire, when she died in 1604. Ambrose Dudley entered tradition as the "Good Earl of Warwick"; this probably came about through his quiet life style, which contrasted with the colourful persona of his brother, the Queen's favourite.

== Ancestry ==
Ancestors of Ambrose Dudley, 3rd Earl of Warwick

8. Sir John Dudley of Atherington
4. Edmund Dudley
9. Elizabeth Bramshott
2. John Dudley, 1st Duke of Northumberland
10. Edward Grey, 1st Viscount Lisle
5. Elizabeth Grey, 6th Baroness Lisle
11. Elizabeth Talbot, 3rd Baroness Lisle
1. Ambrose Dudley
12. Sir Richard Guildford
6. Sir Edward Guildford
13. Anne Pympe
3. Jane Guildford
14. Thomas West, 8th Baron De La Warr
7. Eleanor West
15. Elizabeth Mortimer

== See also ==
- Attainder of Duke of Northumberland and others Act 1553

== Notes ==
Political offices
Preceded by Vacant	Lord Lieutenant of Warwickshire; 1569–1570	Succeeded by Vacant
Preceded by Vacant	Lord Lieutenant of Warwickshire; 1587–1590	Succeeded by ?
Preceded by Sir Nicholas Throckmorton	Chief Butler of England; 1571–1590	Succeeded by ?
Military offices
Preceded by Sir Richard Southwell	Master-General of the Ordnance; 1560–1590 with Sir Philip Sidney (1585–1586)	Vacant Title next held by The Earl of Essex
Peerage of England
Preceded by John Dudley	Earl of Warwick; 2nd creation 1561–1590	Extinct
New creation	Baron Lisle; 5th creation 1561–1590	Extinct
