= Elizabeth Blount =

Mistress of Henry VIII

- Baroness Tailboys of Kyme; Baroness Clinton
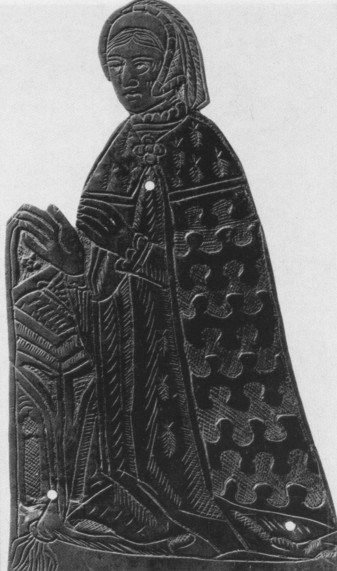
- Stylized brass with the likeness of Blount
- Born: c. 1498–1502; Kinlet, Shropshire
- Died: c. 1540 (aged between 37 and 42); Probably England
- Spouses: Gilbert Tailboys, 1st Baron Tailboys of Kyme; Edward Clinton, 9th Baron Clinton
- Issue: Henry FitzRoy, 1st Duke of Richmond and Somerset (ill.); Elizabeth Tailboys, 4th Baroness Tailboys of Kyme; George Tailboys, 2nd Baron Tailboys of Kyme; Robert Tailboys, 3rd Baron Tailboys of Kyme; Lady Bridget Dymoke; Katherine Clinton, Baroness Burgh; Margaret Clinton, Baroness Willoughby of Parham
- Father: Sir John Blount of Kinlet
- Mother: Katherine Peshall

Elizabeth Blount (c. 1498/c. 1500/c. 1502 – 1540), commonly known during her lifetime as Bessie Blount, was a mistress of Henry VIII of England.

== Early life ==
Blount was the daughter of Sir John Blount and Katherine Peshall, of Kinlet, Bridgnorth, Shropshire. Sir John Blount was a loyal, if unremarkable, servant to the English royal family, who accompanied Henry VIII to France in 1513 when he waged war against Louis XII. The Blount family was of landed gentry status but had no real national import until Blount gave birth to Henry FitzRoy, the only acknowledged illegitimate child of Henry VIII.

Her parents were married in childhood in 1491, as stated in the post-mortem inquisition of Sir Thomas Blount of Kinlet. Her father, John Blount, out of a family of some twenty children, was the eldest son and heir of Sir Thomas Blount of Kinlet, Shropshire, who had been knighted by Henry VII at the battle of Stoke in 1487, on the occasion of the defeat of Lambert Simnel. Her mother was Katherine, heiress of Knightley, in Staffordshire, and of many other manors in that county, the only (legitimate) child of Sir Hugh Peshall, or Persall, a soldier of the highest distinction, who, as Knight of the Body to Henry VII, was in constant attendance on that King.

Sir Hugh is mentioned in the Ballad of Bosworth Field, with his brother-in-law, Sir Humphrey Stanley, among "four good knights" whom the Lord Stanley gives to Henry of Richmond at his request on the eve of the fight. The outline of the story bears the stamp of truth, but in strict accuracy he was of course not knighted by Henry of Richmond until, after the battle, the crown had been placed on Henry's head. During the three succeeding years to this memorable year of 1485, the name of Sir Hugh Peshall frequently occurs in the State records as being the recipient of large sums of money from Henry VII "by way of reward." He died as a young man in 1488, when his daughter Katherine was a small child. John Blount at the time of his marriage to Katherine Peshall appears to have been not more than seven years old; he is stated to have been "forty years old and more" in 1524.

William S. Childe-Pemberton writes:

It is interesting to note that, at the dawn of the Tudor epoch, with the exception of a few such as the Talbots, the Howards, and the Stanleys, many of our great families had as yet not come to the front, and the stars of the Russells, the Cavendishes, and the Cecils had not risen. The parents of Elizabeth Blount, however—the boy-bridegroom and the girl-heiress—were each through their ancestral alliances representatives of the ancient aristocracy of England, and were equally matched in lineage and estate. The marriage took place on August 1, 1491—not, we may observe, at the bride's home, but at Kinlet, the home of the bridegroom. Little change has there been in the external features of Kinlet Church since the two children, marshalled by their elders, passed with procession from hall to church to plight their troth. The old manor-house at Kinlet, demolished in the early part of the eighteenth century, was situated even nearer to the church than is the present mansion; now, as then, both church and house being wholly surrounded by park and woodland of wide extent, and remote from any village or hamlet. The old cross in the churchyard near the southern entrance must have been of great elevation; its quadrilateral base, unique in design, lofty and gabled, is still in its place, though time has wrought some ruin, and the niche in its wall has long been emptied of the saint's image it once held. The Norman doorway, the round massive arches and columns of the nave, stand firm as ever; while the spacious chancel and transepts,1 added by pious ancestors in Early English or Decorated style, still speak to us of mediaeval times, and were already venerable when that bridal procession paused before the high altar. Still in the mullioned windows, amid traces of antique glass of colour unsurpassed by modern imitations, there remains the stained-glass figure of a kneeling knight, helmeted and clad in coat embroidered with the armorial bearings of the Cornwalls, and asking of your charity prayers for his soul, as on the day when his descendant little John knelt with Katherine at the nuptial mass, four hundred and twenty years ago.

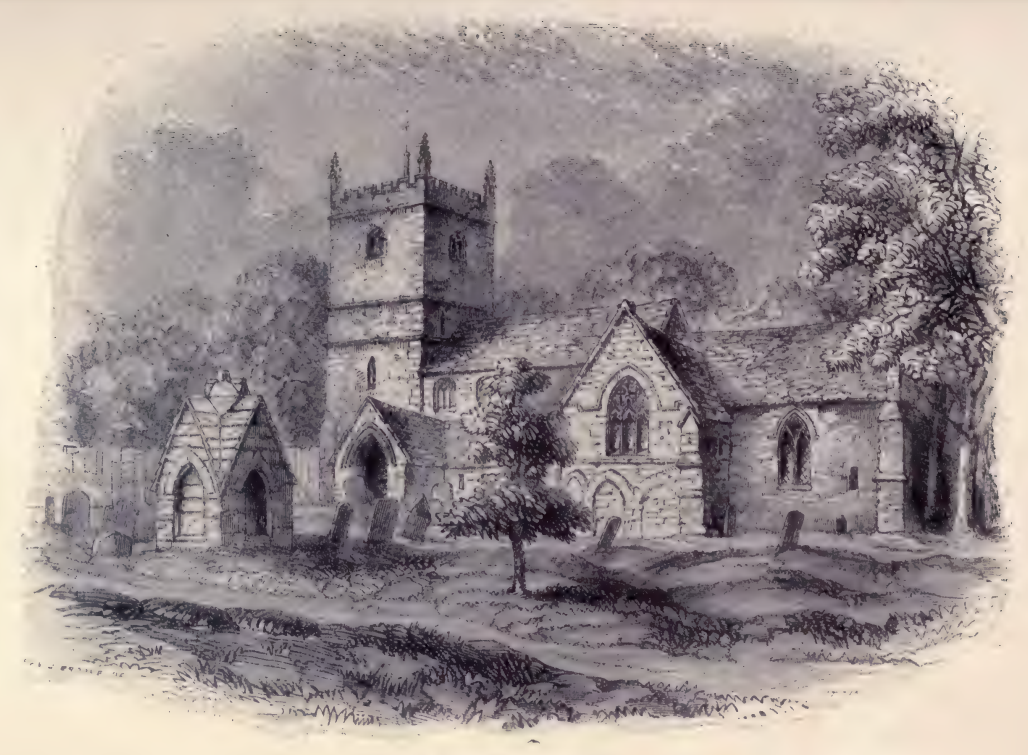
Kinlet Church – From an engraving in 1860

While Elizabeth was a baby, her parents and relatives were brought into association with Katherine of Aragon, when as a bride Katherine resided at Ludlow Castle during her brief marriage with Arthur, Prince of Wales. Of those who hastened to pay their respects to the young Princess of Wales the Blounts of Kinlet were surely among the first. Ludlow, that great border stronghold, a town of the utmost importance in Tudor times, was within the distance of a three hours' ride from the seat of the Blounts—the road thence to Ludlow winding by slopes and valleys along the eastern side of the Clee Hills. "No more romantic scenery is perhaps to be found in all England," writes William S. Childe-Pemberton, "than that which keeps the Clee Hills in view; and Kinlet, still noted for the size and age of its oaks—the same oaks under which the little Elizabeth played in childhood—is situated in the heart of that country of which an old rhymester sings:

Thrice happy he

Twixt Severn and Clee."

Elizabeth's grandfather, Sir Thomas Blount of Kinlet, frequented the Court of the Prince of Wales, both at Ludlow Castle—where as Lord President of the Marches of Wales the boy resided on the outskirts of his principality—and at Ticknell, or Tickenall (Bewdley), which his father, Henry VII, had built for him near the banks of the Severn on the edge of the forest which borders the counties of Worcester and Salop.1 Sir Thomas Blount was Steward of the Royal Park and Manor of Bewdley, of which Ticknell was an appurtenance, and Kinlet is but a few miles distant from Bewdley on the Shropshire side. The Royal residence of Ticknell had a great court and garden and several outhouses which extended on the sides. It was in the chapel of Bewdle that Prince Arthur plighted his troth to the proxy of Katherine of Arragon on May 19, 1499.

Eleanor Croft (born Cornwall of Burford), a kinswoman and her husband were also long connected with the Court. She is described in the early Cornwall pedigrees as "Lady Governess to the young Princes at Ludlow Castle " (probably the Yorkist princes Edward and Edmund), and also as "Lady Governess to Prince Arthur at Ludlow".

When Prince Arthur died, the four "banner-holders" at the lying-instate Sir Thomas Blount was "at the Corner of the Canopy,"bearing the "Banner of the Patible," and among the knights who conveyed the body from Ludlow to Bewdley on its way to its final resting-place in Worcester Cathedral was Sir Thomas Blount—"on the foulest cold windy and rainy day," says the chronicler, "and the worst day I have ever seen—yea, and in many places they were fain to take oxen to draw the chair, so ill was the way." The funeral procession stopped the night at Bewdley on the road, the bier being "set in the quire" of the royal chapel there. Next day, from Bewdley, Sir Richard Croft and Sir William Uvedale rode before to Worcester and "suffered no man to enter the gate of the city till the tyme the corpse was come."

Meanwhile, the parents of little Bessie Blount left the neighbourhood of Ludlow soon after the death of Prince Arthur. Madam Blount's grandfather, Humphrey Peshall, having died in May 1502, she succeeded in ousting her half-uncle Richard, and in establishing her rights to her ancestral estates. The family now removed to her manor of Knightley, in Staffordshire.

William S. Childe-Pemberton writes:

Camden, in his Britannia, says, "The name of the Blounts was very famous in these parts, denoting their golden locks. This is a very ancient and honourable family and hath spread its branches far."

Little is known of Elizabeth Blount's early years, except for her reputation as a beauty, and for her famous affair with King Henry VIII (born 1491; he was about seven years older than Bessie). There is no known portrait of her in existence but there is a stylised brass with her likeness. As a young girl, she came to the King's Court as a maid-of-honour to now the King's wife, Katherine of Aragon. Bessie was a talented dancer and singer, excelling everybody 'in all goodly pastimes', high spirits and energy. In her twenties and thirties, she is described as having had 'very good cheer' and became the King's preferred dancing partner.

She had arrived at Court by the spring of 1512. In the list of "the King's Year-book" for the following year an entry dated from the Court at Greenwich, Sunday, May 8, 1513, stating that a hundred shillings is due to Elizabeth Blount "upon a warrant signed for hir last yere's wages ended at thanuncacon of Our Lady last passed."

It was there at court that the young woman caught the eye of the King and became his mistress during 1514 or 1515, a relationship which continued for about eight years, after the suggestion of an affair was brought to light.

Sculpture of Elizabeth Blount on the tomb monument of her parents at Kinlet church.

== Royal mistress ==
Charles Brandon, Duke of Suffolk, wrote from France, Beauvais, October 25, 1514, to King Henry VIII, and in a postscript the Duke sends him the following message: "And I beseech your Grace to [tell] Mistress Blount and Mistress Carru the next time that I write unto them or send them tokens they shall either write to me or send me tokens again."

Blount's relationship with Henry VIII lasted for some time, compared to his other affairs, which were generally short-lived and unacknowledged.

The names of the two Elizabeths are again associated in the annals of 1514, both appearing in a list of performers in the Christmas mummery that year, held at Greenwich, where the Court was then residing. Maysteres Elisabeth Blont and Maysteres Karew the yong wyff both are on a list left by the King's Master of the Revels, Richard Gibson, in own his handwriting his bill to the King for the costumes supplied by him, and with it the names of the players.

The four ladies were dressed alike in gowns of white satin "savoysin," in hoops of white satin lined with blue, with mantles "savoysin" of blue velvet. They wore bonnets of blue velvet, and coifs of damask gold piped, and fillets of damask gold.

William S. Childe-Pemberton writes:

We may imagine that the blond beauty of the girl Elizabeth Blount, set off to perfection by her blue and white costume, was the theme of general admiration at these Christmas festivities, she being, as we suppose, not more than fourteen years old at this time. The Queen herself may not have been present at this particular scene, for she had rather recently been confined of a "still-born male child to the very great grief of the whole Court." l But on many similar occasions we may be sure that the Queen enthroned among the audience, and surrounded by her ladies, would deign to express her approval and would compliment her Chamberlain, Lord Mountjoy, on his young kinswoman's looks and deportment. We turn again to the Chronicles of Hall, and find that this "damosel in singing, dancing, and all goodly pastimes exceeded all other." How seductive these accomplishments eventually proved

While Henry and his first wife were unsuccessful at producing a male heir to the throne, Henry had a healthy son by Blount, her first pregnancy and her only child by the king. On 15 June 1519, Blount bore the King an illegitimate son who was named Henry FitzRoy, later created Duke of Richmond and Somerset and Earl of Nottingham. He was the only illegitimate son of Henry VIII whom the King acknowledged as his own. After the child's birth, the affair ended for unknown reasons although it is thought that the resulting child was more of a happy accident than an attempted career move. For proving that King Henry was capable of fathering healthy sons, Elizabeth Blount prompted a popular saying, "Bless 'ee, Bessie Blount", often heard during and after this period.

Soon after the birth of his son, the King began an affair with Mary Boleyn, who may have been partly the reason for Blount's dismissal. Like Blount, Boleyn was never formally recognised as the King's mistress and the position of public maîtresse-en-titre was never offered by Henry to anyone but Anne Boleyn, who rejected it.

== Later life ==
In 1522, Blount entered an arranged marriage with Gilbert Tailboys, 1st Baron Tailboys of Kyme (sometimes spelled "Talboys"), whose family was said by some to have a history of insanity. The couple settled in Lincolnshire and later had three children. After her marriage, Blount does not figure much in the day-to-day affairs of the Tudor monarchy or in the official records. Her role in the life of her royal son is less documented, although a letter of 1529 to her from John Palsgrave, Henry FitzRoy's tutor, suggests that her involvement in the duke's upbringing was greater than previously believed. The King's involvement with his son's upbringing was also noted as "doting".

On 23 July 1536, Blount's son Henry FitzRoy died, probably of tuberculosis ("consumption"). Her husband, Gilbert, Lord Tailboys, also predeceased her, dying in 1530 but leaving her a widow of comfortable means. By her marriage to Tailboys, she had three further children, two sons, George and Robert, and one daughter, Elizabeth.

After the death of Tailboys, Blount was wooed unsuccessfully by Lord Leonard Grey. She subsequently married a younger man whose Lincolnshire lands adjoined hers, Edward Clinton or Fiennes, 9th Baron Clinton, thus becoming Elizabeth Fiennes.

William S. Childe-Pemberton writes:

The approximate date of this romantic event is confirmed by the prosaic record of a grant from the King, dated February 12, in the twenty-sixth year of his reign (1534-1535) "of three tuns of Gascon wine yearly of the prizes of the port of Boston, Lincoln, to Elizabeth, late Lady Taylbois, now wife of the Lord Clinton."

They were married some time between 1533 and 1535, and this union produced three daughters.

For a short while, she was a lady-in-waiting to Henry's fourth wife, Anne of Cleves. According to Agnes Strickland, she was a Great Lady of the Queen's Household to Katherine Howard. (Note: These two lists are so similar that one suspects that they are one and the same. Identical except for the substituting of the Duchess of Norfolk for the Duchess of Suffolk in the case of Katherine Howard. William S. Childe-Pemberton also touches on the subject on pp. 242–243. Besides, the original list was struck out, see Letters & Papers. And we know that Anne of Cleves had ladies not on the list, Katherine Howard herself and Mother Lowe among them. Katherine Howard did, too, Joan Bulmer being among those. However, the time between Anne of Cleves and Katherine Howard was so short that said lists could have been very similar, while leaving room for adjustments according to the personal taste of the ladies in question. It could have served as a "blueprint", as it were. The court of Henry VIII was also dominated by a lot of the same people, so it is not unnatural that a lot of the same people would be nominated and serve his Queens in succession.) Blount returned to her husband's estates, where she died shortly after July 1540. It has traditionally been asserted that the cause of her death was consumption. She was not buried with either husband.

== Importance ==
Compared with Henry's first two wives, Katherine of Aragon and Anne Boleyn, Blount's importance to history is arguably negligible. Nevertheless, her status as Henry Fitzroy's mother endows her with notable significance amongst Henry VIII's mistresses. Blount was the mother of Henry's only acknowledged illegitimate child, and at one point in the 1520s it was suggested that her son should be named the King's legal heir. Although nothing came of these plans, that she was the mother of such an important child made her an object of interest to many of her contemporaries.

The fact that Henry fathered a healthy son with Elizabeth would later prove to be important during the king's Great Matter. Katherine experienced at least seven pregnancies during her marriage to Henry. Katherine gave birth to a son, Henry, Duke of Cornwall, in 1511, but the prince died of unknown causes just seven weeks later. After the birth of Katherine and Henry's daughter Mary—their only child to survive infancy—all of Katherine's subsequent pregnancies ended in miscarriages or stillbirths. Many have suggested that Henry FitzRoy's birth further affirmed Henry's desires to end his marriage to Katherine. The birth of FitzRoy served as evidence of Henry's ability to sire a living, albeit illegitimate, son, further stirring Henry's skepticism and apprehensions about the validity of his marriage to Katherine.

== Issue ==
From King Henry VIII:

1. Henry FitzRoy, 1st Duke of Richmond and Somerset, 1st Earl of Nottingham, born 1519, died 1536. Married Lady Mary Howard. No children.

From a first marriage to Gilbert Talboys, 1st Baron Tailboys of Kyme:

1. Elizabeth Tailboys, 4th Baroness Tailboys of Kyme, born c. 1520, died 1563, who at the death of her brother, the 3rd baron, became the 4th Baroness Tailboys of Kyme. Married firstly Thomas Wymbish, of Nocton (died 1553), who claimed the title in his wife's right. It was, however, ruled that a husband could not so bear his wife's title unless he had a child by her; this ruling was the final decision on the point. Married secondly, c.1552, as his second wife, Ambrose Dudley, 3rd Earl of Warwick (c. 1530–1590). She died in 1563, and, as she had no children, the barony became extinct.
2. George Tailboys, 2nd Baron Tailboys of Kyme, born c. 1523, who succeeded as 2nd Baron Tailboys of Kyme, and died on 6 September 1540. Married Margaret Skipwith in 1539. No children.
3. Robert Tailboys, 3rd Baron Tailboys of Kyme, de jure Lord Kyme, born c. 1523, died 1541.

From a second marriage to Edward Clinton, 1st Earl of Lincoln:

1. Lady Bridget Clinton (born c. 1536). She married Robert Dymoke (1531–1580), of Scrivelsby, Lincolnshire, some time around 1556 and had ten children. Dymoke (sometimes spelt Dymock or Dymocke) was a devout Catholic and named a martyr after his death.
2. Lady Katherine Clinton (b. c. 1538 – d. 14 August 1621). She married William Burgh, 2nd Baron Burgh of Gainsborough (c. 1522 – 10 October 1584), son of Thomas Burgh, 1st Baron Burgh. Had three sons and three daughters, one of them being Thomas Burgh, 3rd Baron Burgh.
3. Lady Margaret Clinton (b. c. 1539). She married Charles Willoughby, 2nd Baron Willoughby of Parham (died 1603), and had five children.

== Fictional portrayals ==
- Ruta Gedmintas in the Showtime cable television series The Tudors
- Chloe Harris in the Starz limited series The Spanish Princess, which is based on the novels of The Constant Princess and The King's Curse by Philippa Gregory.
