= Violet Fane =

British poet and ambassadress

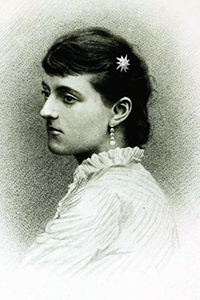
- Born: Mary Montgomerie Lamb; 24 February 1843; Littlehampton, Sussex, England
- Died: 13 October 1905 (aged 62); Harrogate, Yorkshire, England
- Other name: Mary Montgomerie Currie
- Occupations: Poet, Writer, Ambassadress
- Spouses: Henry Sydenham Singleton (m. 1864; died 1893) Philip Currie, 1st Baron Currie (m. 1894; died 1905)
- Relatives: Sir Charles Lamb, 2nd Baronet (grandfather)

Mary Montgomerie, Lady Currie (née Lamb, 24 February 1843 – 13 October 1905), known by the literary pseudonym Violet Fane, was an English poet, writer, and later an ambassadress. Active in the British literary scene from 1872 until her death in 1905, Fane was a literary celebrity associated with Aestheticism, Medievalism, whose verses were set to music by composers such as Paolo Tosti and Hermine Küchenmeister-Rudersdorf. As a well-known figure in London society, Fane's coterie included famous literary personas such as Robert Browning, Algernon Swinburne, A. W. Kinglake, Alfred Austin, James McNeil Whistler, Lillie Langtry, and Oscar Wilde, who praised the oracular bent of Fane's opinions on 'the relation of art to nature' by saying that she ‘live[d] between Parnassus and Piccadilly’.

== Early life ==
Born as Mary Montgomerie Lamb prematurely in 1843 at Littlehampton, Sussex, Fane was the eldest daughter of Charles James Savile Montgomerie Lamb (1816–1856) and Anna Charlotte Grey (bap. 1824, d. 1880). As the heir of the baronetcy of Burville, Berkshire, and Beauport, Her father was descended from two aristocratic families. Her mother, was the daughter of a draper, Mr Grey and was considered a great beauty.Charlie and Charlotte eloped in secret, and got married first in Edinburgh, and then in London to validate the legitimacy of their marriage. When Fane was born a few years later, the couple sent their (then one-month-old) daughter to her paternal grandparents with a note that explained their secret marriage and asking for their forgiveness. As a token of their good intentions, Charlie and Charlotte presented the baby to Sir Charles and Lady Mary as their granddaughter. From then on, Fane lived with her grandparents in their ancestral home, Beauport Park. Her parents went abroad for a year-long honeymoon, and returned to join Fane and her grandparents in Beauport as devotees of the oriental life.

Her parents and their orientalist acquaintances were the first ones to introduce Fane to the exotic customs of the East during her childhood. They encouraged her to wear Turkish dress and to go barefoot as both her parents did. They also dispensed with beds and summoned their daughter by clapping their hands. Fane had four siblings: Clara (b.1844), Archibald (b.1845), Flora (b. 1849) and Charles Anthony (b. 1857), three of whom survived to adulthood. Clara, who died in 1855 for unknown reasons, would later become a key subject to which Fane often returned to in her poetry. These poems form a sequence which are referred to as the 'Clara Poems'.

Her father died in 1856, reportedly related to injuries received in the Crimean War. Lady Sophia Adelaide Theodosia Pelham, the daughter of the Earl of Yarborough and wife of Archibald Montgomerie, 14th Earl of Eglinton, took the young Fane under her care and introduced her to London society, where she rapidly became well known as a great conversationalist and a woman of considerable wit.

== Literary career ==
The biographical note that is situated at the beginning of her 1892 collection, Poems, mentions Fane's early poetic calling, and declares:

It is interesting to note, in these days when hereditary influences cannot be disregarded, that “Violet Fane” descends, upon her father’s side, from the houses of Seton, Somerville, and Montgomerie, in Scotland, and from the old Provençal family of Montolieu in France, several of whose members were authors of distinction; and that […] she can claim kinship with the witty and eccentric John, Earl of Rochester, whose poetic talent was not always turned to the use of edifying.

Despite her literary heritage, Fane's first published work was not to fall within the field of poetry. A year before she was to marry Singleton, several etchings by her appeared in an illustrated edition of Alfred Lord Tennyson's 1830 poem, Mariana, which seems to have been published privately in 1863. The fact that Fane’s illustrations accompanied Mariana seems apt because the poem perfectly captures Fane’s own lovelorn state after her disappointment with Vyner, which might have encouraged Fane to identify with the tragic romantic heroine of the poem, who also suffers because of the absence of her lover. The first collection of poetry to appear under the pseudonym Violet Fane is From Dawn to Noon. The collection was published in 1872, when Fane had already started an extra-marital affair with the diplomat Philip Currie.

Her family's disapproval of her writing pushed Fane to assume a nom de plume when she started publishing poetry. Therefore, she took the name ‘Violet Fane’ from Benjamin Disraeli's novel, Vivian Grey (1826). In her article, ‘Are Remarkable People Remarkable Looking? An Extravaganza’, Fane states that Disraeli called her his ‘dear goddaughter’ when they met because she assumed Violet Fane as her nom de plume. Although she admits to having read Vivian Grey many years ago, Fane also claims to have completely forgotten about Disraeli's Violet Fane when choosing her pseudonym (‘Remarkable People’, pp. 627–628). She then contradicts herself, however, by explaining that the reason she chose the name ‘Violet Fane’ for her literary purposes was because the character ‘died in the arms of her lover’ and a death like that was ‘worth living for’ (‘Remarkable People’, p. 629). This seems to be in harmony with the dominant emotion of Dawn to Noon.

== Personal life ==
Fane fell in love with Clare Vyner, a handsome Yorkshire squire, in the early 1860s, but their attachment did not lead to marriage. In 1864, when Fane was twenty-one years old, she married Henry Sydenham Singleton, Esq. (1819–1893), then forty-five, and thus became Mrs Singleton despite her mother's objections. However, Vyner remained in her heart. This unrequited love inspired many of the poems Fane wrote in the 1860s, which were to be published in her first poetry collection, From Dawn to Noon in 1872. As an Anglo-Irish absentee landowner, Singleton was a part of the landed gentry. He is listed in the 1883 edition of John Bateman's Great Landowners of Great Britain and Ireland as having 8,879 acres of land in Cavan, Louth, Meath, and Hampshire, which generated a considerable income of £6,715 per annum (£705,930 as of 2025).

He is described as a 'strange misanthropic' and a 'backseat husband', who seemingly did not, or could not, make Fane happy. They had four sons and two daughters.

Sometime between 1869 and 1870, Fane met Philip Henry Wodehouse Currie, then a young diplomat, whilst residing in Singleton's country estate, Hazely, which was not far from Currie's father's country estate, Minley. Currie was knighted in 1885. Singleton died in 1893 and Fane married Currie the following year. They lived in Constantinople, where Currie was British Ambassador to the Ottoman Empire. They later moved to Rome following his appointment as Ambassador to Italy. He was created Baron Currie in 1899 and after his retirement in 1903 they returned to England.

After two months of illness, she died of heart failure in 1905 at the Grand Hotel in Harrogate, Yorkshire.
