= Sir Charles Lamb, 2nd Baronet =

British courtier, writer and soldier

Sir Charles Lamb, Bt DCL

High Sheriff of Sussex
- In office 1829–1830
- Preceded by: Robert Aldridge
- Succeeded by: Thomas Sanctuary

Personal details
- Born: Charles Montolieu Burgess; 8 July 1785 Forden, Montgomeryshire
- Died: 21 March 1864 (aged 78) Hastings, East Sussex
- Spouse(s): Lady Mary Montgomerie (m. 1815; died 1848) Frances Margesson (m. 1853; died 1860)
- Relations: Violet Fane (granddaughter)
- Children: Charles James Savile Montgomerie Lamb
- Parent(s): Sir James Lamb, 1st Baronet; Anne Montolieu

Sir Charles Montolieu Lamb, 2nd Baronet DCL (8 July 1785 – 21 March 1864), known until 1821 as Charles Burges, was a British courtier, writer, and soldier.

== Early life ==
Charles Burges was born on 8 July 1785 at Nantcribba Hall in the parish of Forden in the historic county of Montgomeryshire (now in Powys) as Charles Montolieu Burgess. He was the son of James Burges (who later changed his name to Lamb) and his wife Anne Montolieu, the third daughter of Lt.-Col. Louis Charles Montolieu, Baron of St Hippolite.

In 1821, when his father took the name of Lamb, Charles Burges became Charles Montolieu Lamb by Royal Licence.

== Career ==
He gained the rank of Lieutenant-Colonel in the Ayrshire Yeomanry. Following the death of his father on 1 December 1824, he succeeded as the 2nd Baronet Burges as well as the Knight Marshal of the Royal Household, which he held until the post was abolished in 1846. He held the office of Sheriff of Sussex between 1829 and 1830. He was also a writer.

From 1847 until 1860, Lamb was the Grand Prior of the Order of Saint John in England.

== Personal life ==
On 30 June 1815, he married the widow Lady Mary Montgomerie (1787–1848), a daughter of Gen. Archibald Montgomerie, 11th Earl of Eglinton and, his second wife, the former Frances Twysden (a daughter of Sir William Twysden, 6th Baronet). Her first husband was her cousin, Maj.-Gen. Archibald Montgomerie, Lord Montgomerie (son of Hugh Montgomerie, 12th Earl of Eglinton), with whom she had a son, Archibald Montgomerie, 13th Earl of Eglinton. Before her death, they were the parents of:

- Charles James Savile Montgomerie Lamb (c. 1816–1856), who married Anne Charlotte Grey, a daughter of Arthur Grey. After his death, she married Comte Henry-Antoine de Chasseloup-Laubat.

On 28 October 1853, Sir Charles married Frances Margesson, daughter of Rev. William Margesson, rector of Watlington, and the former Mary Frances Cooke, at Geneva, Switzerland. Her sister, Julia Helena Webster, was the wife of Sir Frederick Webster, a younger son of Sir Godfrey Webster, 5th Baronet.

Sir Charles died on 21 March 1860 at age 74 at Beauport Park, near Hastings, East Sussex. As his son predeceased him, he was succeeded in the baronetcy by his grandson, Archibald. His widow, Lady Lamb, died in 1884.

=== Descendants ===
Through his son Charles, he was a grandfather of Mary Montgomerie Lamb (1843–1905), a poet under the pen-name Violet Fane who was the wife of Henry Sydenham Singleton and Philip Currie, 1st Baron Currie, and Sir Archibald Lamb, 3rd Baronet, who married Louisa Mary Caroline Durrant (a daughter of Sir Henry Durrant, 3rd Baronet).

Court offices
Preceded by Sir James Lamb, Bt	Knight Marshal; 1824–1846	Succeeded by Post abolished
Honorary titles
Preceded by Robert Aldridge	High Sheriff of Sussex; 1829–1830	Succeeded by Thomas Sanctuary
Baronetage of Great Britain
Preceded by James Bland Lamb	Baronet (of Burghfield); 1824–1864	Succeeded by Archibald Lamb
