= Philip Currie =

Philip Currie may refer to:

- Philip Currie, 1st Baron Currie (1834–1906), British diplomat
- Philip J. Currie (born 1949), Canadian palaeontologist
