= Lamb baronets of Burghfield (1795) =

Escutcheon of the Lamb baronets of Burghfield, quartering

The Burges, later Lamb baronetcy, of Burghfield in the County of Berkshire, was created in the Baronetage of Great Britain on 21 October 1795 for the poet and politician James Burges. He was brought into parliament as member for Helston in 1787, through his personal contacts with the circle of William Pitt the younger. Leaving the seat in 1790, having become an under-secretary in the Foreign Office in 1789, he gave up the post in an agreement with Lord Grenville who wanted it for a friend. The baronetcy and a sinecure were quid pro quo.

Burges married in 1777, as his first wife, Elizabeth Noel, daughter of Edward Noel, 1st Viscount Wentworth and Judith Lamb, daughter of William Lamb. In 1821 he assumed by Royal licence the surname of Lamb in lieu of his patronymic, going by James Bland Lamb, having succeeded to the estate of the financier John Lamb.

He was succeeded by his son by his second wife Anne Montolieu, Charles, the 2nd Baronet. He was Knight Marshal of the Royal Household between 1824 and 1864: this was the sinecure granted in 1795 to his father, with remainder to him. The title became extinct on the death of the 4th Baronet in 1948.

== Burges, later Lamb baronets, of Burghfield (1795) ==
- Sir James Bland Lamb, 1st Baronet (1752–1824)
- Sir Charles Montolieu Lamb, 2nd Baronet (1785–1864)
  - Charles James Savile Montgomerie Lamb (c. 1816–1856), father of the 3rd Baronet, and of the posthumous 4th Baronet.
- Sir Archibald Lamb, 3rd Baronet (1845–1921)
- Sir Charles Anthony Lamb, 4th Baronet (1857–1948), left no heir.

== Arms ==
Coat of arms of Burges, later Lamb of Burghfield
Notes The crescent denotes that Wordsworth is a second son. Crest 1st: a lamb passant Sable, charged with a bezant, thereon a trefoil slipped Vert ; 2nd: a camel's head Proper, bezantee, and erased Gules. Escutcheon Quarterly: 1st and 4th: per pale, wavy, Argent Erminois, a chevron between three lambs, passant, Sable (Lamb); 2nd and 3rd: per fesse, Argent and Ermine a fesse, Lozengy Or and Azure; in chief, three masclcs, of the Last; a bordure of the Fourth, bezantée; in a dexter canton, Gules, a bend of the field, charged with a staff of office of Knights-Marshal proper (Burges). Motto Levius fit patientia

== Background ==
George Burges (1723–1786), father of the 1st Baronet, was military secretary and aide-de-camp to Major General Humphrey Bland. At the 1746 Battle of Culloden, he captured the standard of Charles Edward Stuart. He later became receiver-general of the salt duties and comptroller of the customs of Scotland. He married in 1748 Anne Whichnour, daughter of James Somerville, 13th Lord Somerville.

== Notes ==
Baronetage of Great Britain
Preceded by Poore baronets	Lamb baronets of Burghfield; 21 October 1795	Succeeded by Farquhar baronets
