= Eglinton Street, Galway =

Street in Galway, Ireland

Eglinton Street
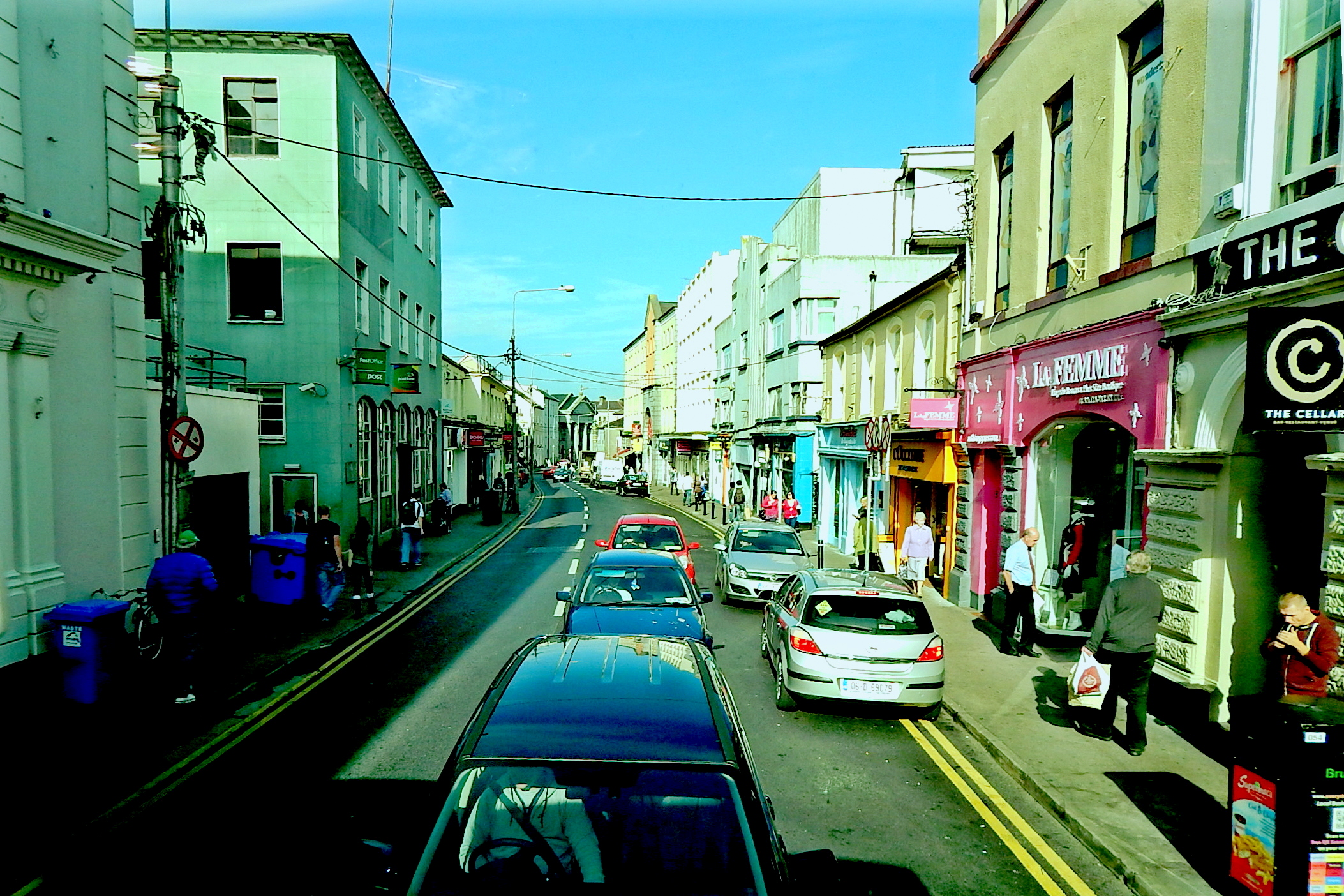
- Eglinton Street in Galway
- Interactive map of Eglinton Street
- Native name: Sráid Eglinton (Irish)
- Length: 0.14 km (0.087 mi)
- Location: Galway, Ireland
- Coordinates: 53°27′44″N 9°05′21″W
- South: Williamsgate Street
- West: St Francis Street

Other
- Known for: Colonial Buildings; Eglinton Street Post Office

Eglinton Street (Irish: Sráid Eglinton) is a street located in Galway, Ireland. It was opened in 1852 and named after Lord Lieutenant of Ireland Archibald Montgomerie, 13th Earl of Eglinton during his visit to Galway.

== History ==
In the late 1840s, a road connecting Williamsgate Street to St Francis Street was proposed. The project was to cost 200 pounds and would be built on land owned by a one Mr. Bath. The road was expected to have a positive impact on shops and dwellings. It was also expected that this road would lead to the construction of higher quality developments in the area.

The street was opened in August 1852 by the then Lord Lieutenant Archibald Montgomerie, 13th Earl of Eglinton.

Colonial Buildings, designed by E.H. Carson and built in 1866. Today, much of the moulding around the windows and on the roof has been removed since its construction, and the building is generally in poor repair.

In 1888, the Royal Irish Constabulary Eglinton Street Barracks was completed. This building served as the headquarters of the RIC in Galway until 1922, after which it was used as a barracks by an Garda Síochána until 26 January 1986.

Between 1959 and 1960 the Galway City Telephone Exchange; the first telephone exchange in the city, was constructed.

The Lion's Tower, originally built in 1278, was a segment of the Galway medieval walls and was located on the street until it was fully demolished in 1970.
