= Nantcribba =

- Township
- Location in Wales Powys
- Coordinates: 52.60499°N 3.12747°W
- OS grid reference: SO237014
- Sovereign state: United Kingdom
- Country: Wales
- District: Powys

Nantcribba is a township in the parish of Forden in the historic county of Montgomeryshire and now in Powys It is also the site of Nantcribba Castle which was built by the Corbett, Barons of Caus, of Caus Castle in Shropshire. To the south of the Castle site was Nantcribba Hall, which was owned by the Devereux family and the Marquises of Hereford. In the 19th century Nantcribba became part of the Leighton Hall estates.

== Location: The site of the Castle and Nantcribba Hall ==
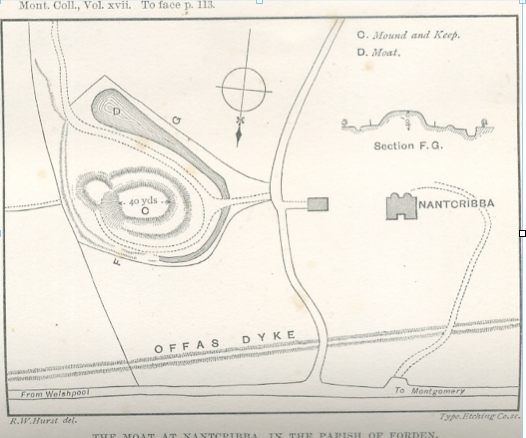
Location of Nantcribba Castle and Nantcribba Hall, 1884

Nantcribba Castle lies immediately to the SSE of Offa's Dyke. Nantcribba Farm and the Model Farm buildings are to the E and the Moated Manor site is further to the E. Nantcribba Hall (now replaced by Parklands) is to the S of Offa's Dyke and to the W of the Nantcribba Castle. Hen Nantcribba is equidistant between the Castle and Nantcribba Hall

== Nantcribba Castle ==
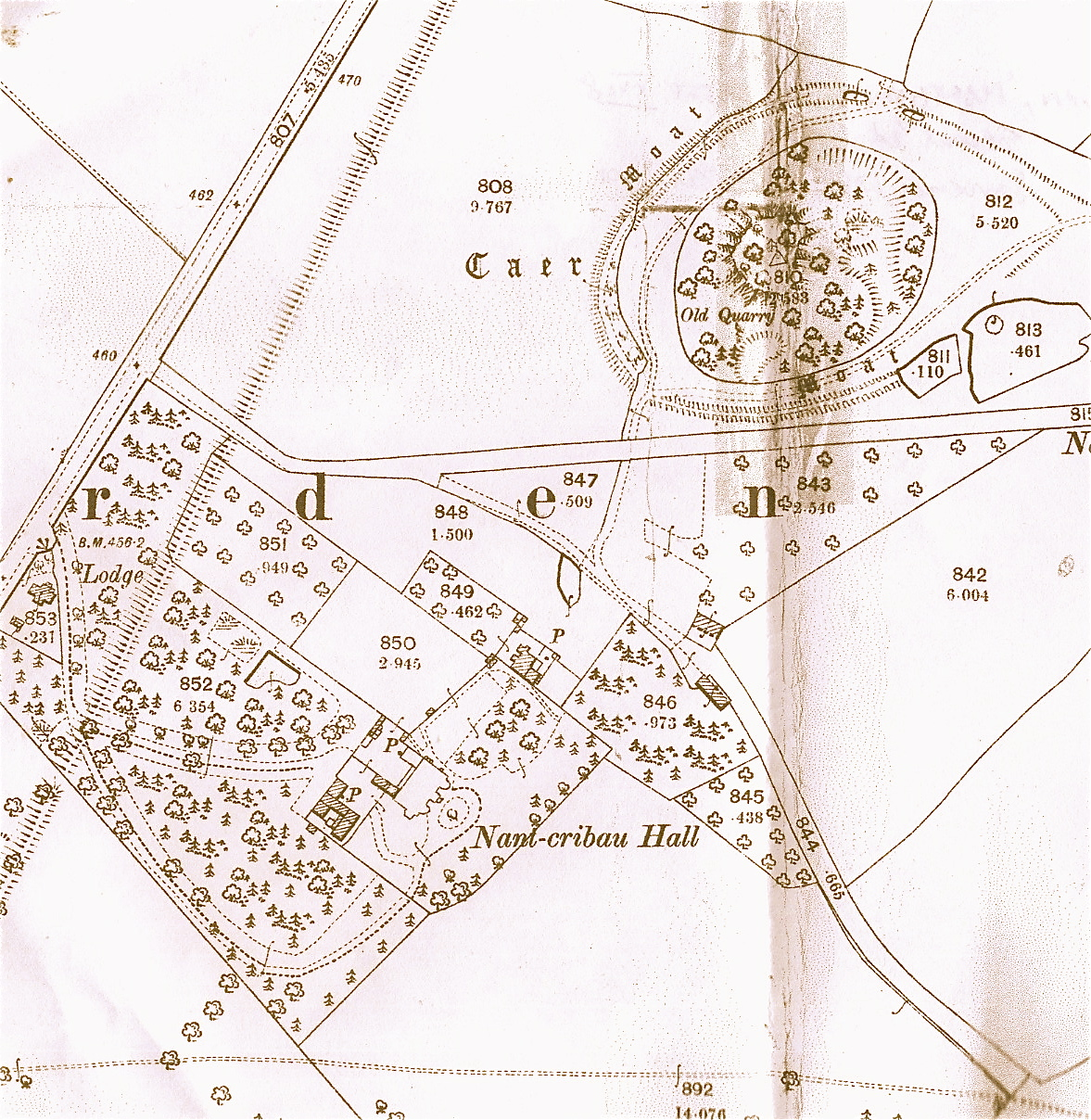
Nantcribba Hall and Castle 1902

The castle has been suggested as the castle of Gwyddgrug that was mentioned in 1260 as belonging to the Corbets of Caus and taken by Gruffydd ap Gwenwynwyn on the instructions of Llywelyn the Great in 1263. The identification of the site as being Gwyddgrug is by no means certain. While the Corbets regained the area after 1277, there is no evidence that the castle was re-built.

A description in 1786 by Thomas Pennant appears to record an 18th-century excavation of the castle.

‘A little beyond (Offa’s Dyke), near the house of Nantcribba, rises a great conoid rock. A few years ago, on taking away the top, were discovered the remains of a little fort; and on paring away the rubbish, it appeared to have been square, with a round tower probably at each corner: one is tolerably entire, and is only nine feet diameter within; the wall seven feet severn feet seven inches thick. There had been some small square rooms, with door cases of good freestone: the rest of the building is of rough stone, cemented with clay. This place was probably ruined by fire: for I observed some melted lead, mixed with charcoal and several pieces of vitrified stuff. There is no history relative to it. It must be very antient, for on the top is the stool of a vast oak. The base of the rock is surrounded with a ditch, cut through it, leaving only a narrow pass to the fort. At a distance is another trench.’

== The Moated Site and Hen Nantcribba ==
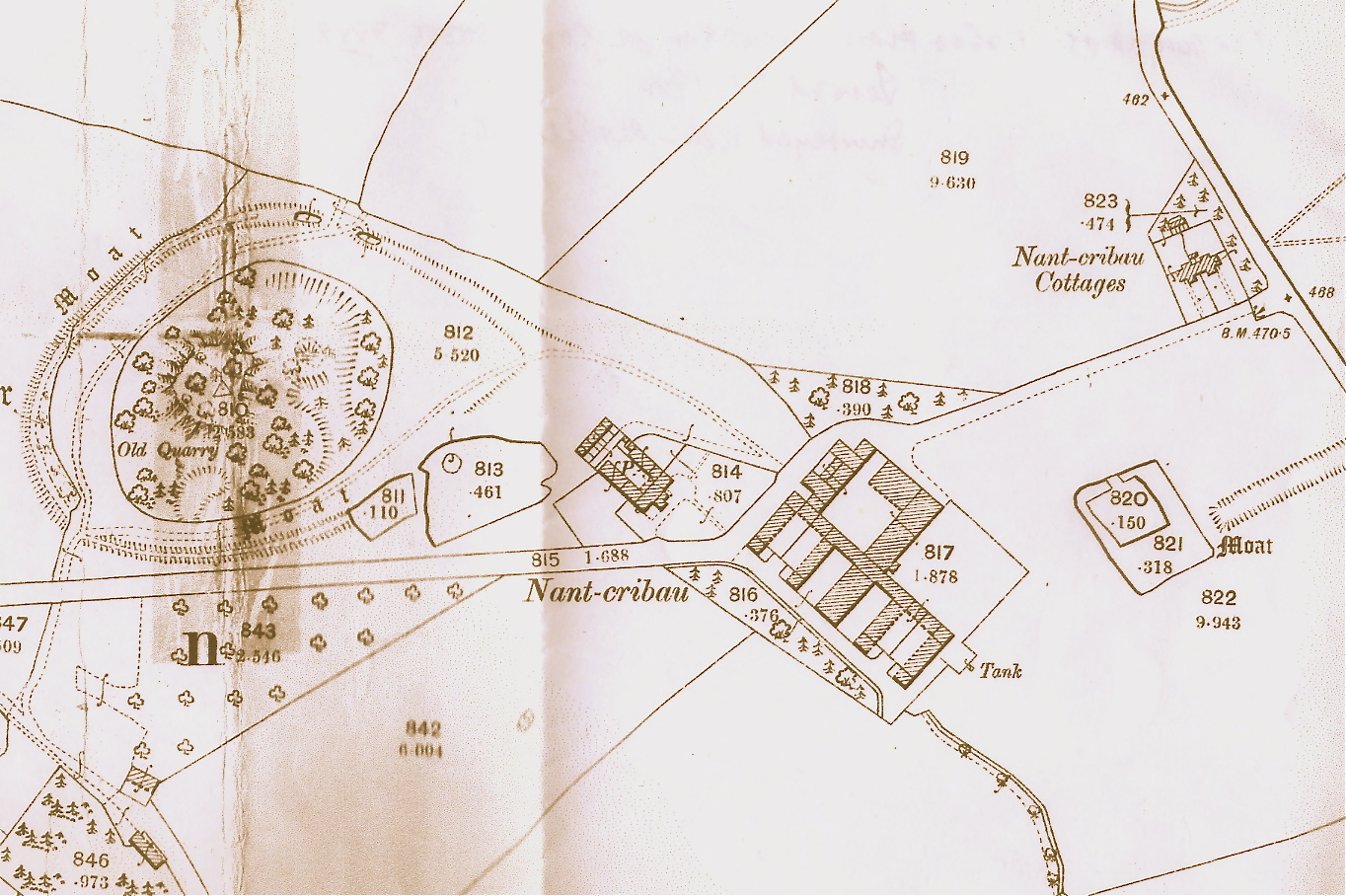
Nantcribba Model Farm and Farmhouse, Moated site and Castle

In 1446, Maredudd ap Cadwaladr acquired Nantcribba, initially by lease from Humphrey Stafford, 1st Duke of Buckingham. This was the start of the association with the Lloyd family and it seems likely that they would have occupied the Moated Manor House site to the East of the castle. The estate passed from Lloyds to the Purcells of Welshpool and Shrewsbury around 1600. John Purcell was the Member of Parliament for Montgomeryshire in 1660 and the MP for Montgomery from 1661 until his death in 1665.. The Purcells are likely to have lived at Hen Nantcribba, a C17 timber-framed house with the W wing and S side rebuilt in stone in the C19, and a tall shaped brick chimney abutted to the N. In 1667 the Purcells' lands were divided between John's daughters Mary and Catherine Purcell. Catherine sold her portion in 1680, which included Nantcribba, to her second-cousin, Arthur Devereux of Vaynor, Berriew, for £3279. The Devereux were a junior branch of the family of the Earls of Essex and titled Viscount Hereford

== Nantcribba Hall ==
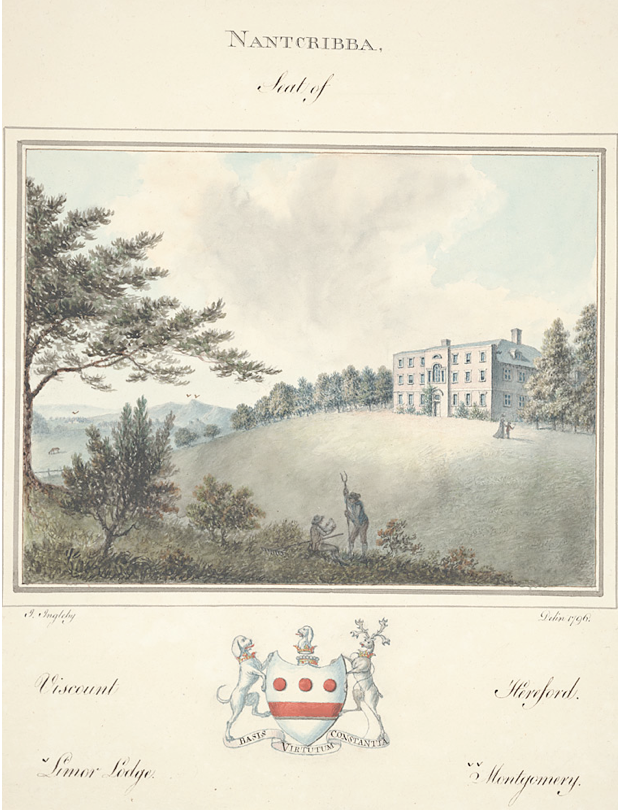
Nantcribba Hall. Watercolour by John Ingleby 1796

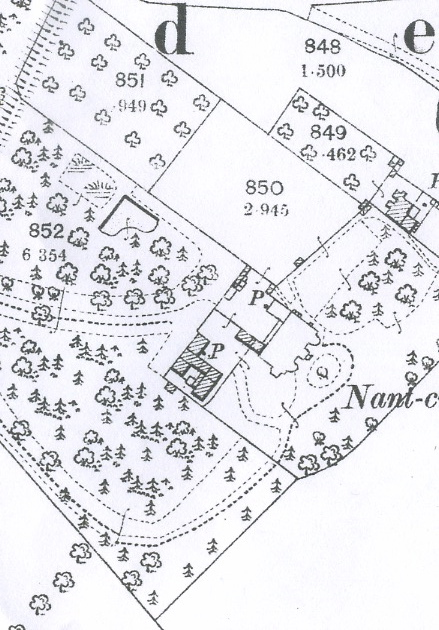
Site of Nantcribba Hall in 1902 with stable block and Parkland

In 1697 Arthur Devereux employed the Bridgnorth architect Henry Pagett to design a brick house, which stood to the west of the Nantcribba Castle and Hen Nantcribba. This house was placed on a ridge of high ground, with views over Shropshire to the east and Montgomeryshire to the west. This house was modified in the mid 18th by the Earl of Hereford, but shortly afterwards the Earls fell on hard times and the House was let to a succession of tenants, one of whom was Sir James Bland Burges, the M P for Helston, in, Cornwall, who lived there between 1785 and 1789 Eventually in 1863, the House and surrounding lands were sold to John Naylor, a Liverpool banker, who had already purchased two other Montgomeryshire estates: Brynllywarch in Kerry and Leighton Hall. It was probably at this time that the frontage of the house was lowered and altered. The house was largely destroyed in 1899 when the family who were living in it were at a ball in Welshpool. The house, now known as Parklands, has subsequently been re-built, incorporating part of the stable block, while some of the walled garden survives.

== The Development of the Nantcribba Estate by the Naylors ==
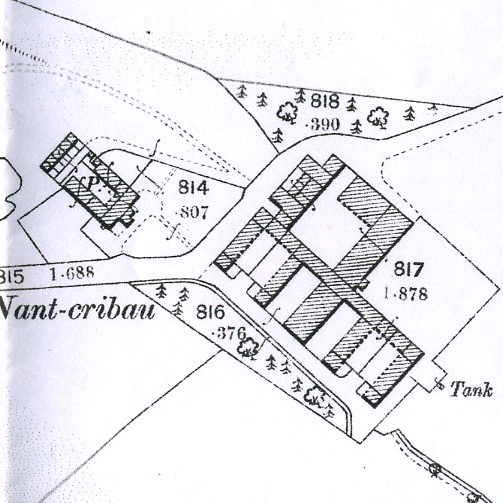
Nantcribba Model Farm and Farmhouse

When the estate was acquired by John Naylor in 1863, he used the firm of architects Poundley and Walker, who worked from offices at Brynllywarch, Kerry, to design a new Model Farm and Farmhouse, a gatehouse on the B 4388 Montgomery to Forden Road and worker's housing on the A490, Forden to Churchstoke Road. The single-story gatehouse is in a whitish brick often used by the architect, David Walker, while the other buildings are in a reddish brick, some with stone rustication and Cefn stone facings which are typical of Poundley and Walker. The model farm is laid out on the typical grid plan adopted by Poundley, and an axial row of buildings, which would have contained a drive shaft to provide a power source to adjacent yards. The layout is basically symmetrical, with a 2-storey central spine range running NE - SW, of approximately 12m span, containing the main straw barn, having 2-storey cross ranges of 6.5m span, 14 roof bays each side, set 2/3rds of the length to the SW, from which 2 single storey ranges spring at right angles, each with 7 open arches, and terminating in pens each with a small yard. The single storey ranges form 2 stock yards each side of the SW end of the barn range, designed for beef cattle. The spine barn range has 14 tensioned queen post-and-collar trusses NE of the cross range junction, and the cross ranges have haunched king posts and angled strut trusses. The large stockyard in the northern angle is paved with large stone sets, and is defined by a 7-bay carthouse on cast iron columns on its NE side, with a wide 6-roof-bay granary over. At right angles to the NW cross range, the large stock yard is enclosed by a further range, with stables for brood mares on the inner (yard) side, and for stallions on the outer face. The corresponding E angle contains the rick yard. Tall round-arched openings give access to the enclosed paved N yard, with similar arches forming a cross space in the great barn range. Access doors to the feeding walks are framed and battened, with some recessed ironmongery, and windows are of part louvred. The cattle yards between the SW wings are enclosed by stone coped brick walls. A stone shield with initials and date on the SW gable of the barn, and some bricks are impressed JN1874 for John Naylor. The lack of farm buildings on the NE sector, suggests that the layout was not completed. The effluent flow away to a very large holding tank beyond the SE end of the cross range, with distribution pipes leading to the fields, similar to the system used at Leighton. The buildings are in the course of conversion into a housing scheme of 26 residential dwellings.
