= Leg before wicket =

Cricket rule

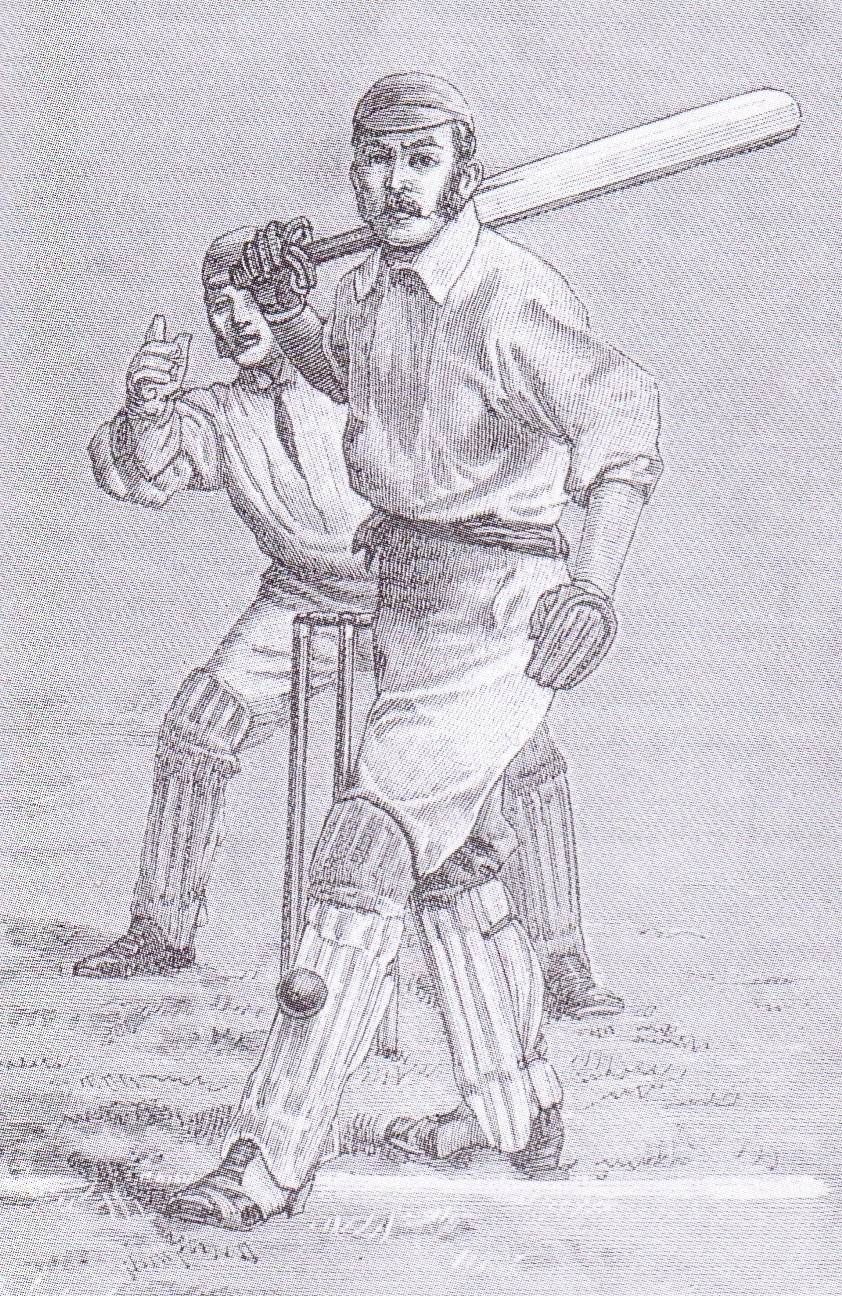
A 1904 illustration from the Badminton Library's Cricket, showing a batsman who is leg before wicket. The original caption was "A clear case" [of lbw].

Leg before wicket (lbw) is one of the ways in which a batter can be dismissed in the sport of cricket. Following an appeal by the fielding side, the umpire may rule a batter out LBW if the ball would have struck the wicket but was instead intercepted by any part of the batsman's body (except the hand(s) holding the bat). The umpire's decision will depend on a number of criteria, including where the ball pitched, whether the ball hit in line with the wickets, the ball's expected future trajectory after hitting the batsman, and whether the batsman was attempting to hit the ball.

Leg before wicket first appeared in the laws of cricket in 1774, as batsmen began to use their pads to prevent the ball from hitting their wicket. Over several years, refinements were made to clarify where the ball should pitch and to remove the element of interpreting the batsman's intentions. The 1839 version of the law used a wording that remained in place for nearly 100 years. However, starting in the latter part of the 19th century, batsmen became increasingly expert at "pad-play" to reduce the risk of their dismissal. Following a number of failed proposals for reform, in 1935 the law was expanded, such that batters could be dismissed lbw even if the ball pitched outside the line of off stump. Critics felt this change made the game unattractive as it encouraged negative tactics at the expense of leg spin bowling.

After considerable debate and various experiments, the law was changed again in 1972. In an attempt to reduce pad-play, the new version, which is still in use, allowed batters to be out lbw in some circumstances if they did not attempt to hit the ball with their bat. Since the 1990s, the availability of television replays and, later, ball-tracking technology to assist umpires has increased the percentage of lbws in major matches. However, the accuracy of the technology and the consequences of its use remain controversial.

In his 1995 survey of cricket laws, Gerald Brodribb states: "No dismissal has produced so much argument as lbw; it has caused trouble from its earliest days". Owing to its complexity, the law is widely misunderstood among the general public and has proven controversial among spectators, administrators and commentators; lbw decisions have sometimes caused crowd trouble. Since the law's introduction, the proportion of lbw dismissals has risen steadily through the years.

== Definition ==
The area shaded in blue in the above diagram of a cricket pitch is in line with the wickets

The definition of leg before wicket (lbw) is currently Law 36 in the Laws of Cricket, written by the Marylebone Cricket Club (MCC). Before a batter can be dismissed lbw, the fielding team must appeal to the umpire. If the bowler delivers a no-ball — an illegal delivery — the batter cannot be out lbw under any circumstances. Otherwise, for the batter to be adjudged lbw, the ball, if it bounces, must pitch in line with or on the off side of the wickets. (Note: On a cricket pitch, there is a set of stumps at each end. The ball pitches in line with the wickets if, when bowled, it lands in the area directly between these stumps.) (Note: For a right-handed batter, the off side is the right-hand side of the pitch when viewed from his perspective. For a left-handed batter, the off side is the left-hand side.) Then the ball must strike part of the batter's body without first touching his/her bat, (Note: In the Laws of Cricket, the batter's bat is considered to include the hand or hands holding it.) in line with the wickets and have been going on to hit the stumps. The batter may also be out lbw if, having made no attempt to hit the ball with their bat, they are struck outside the line of off stump by a ball that would have hit the wickets. The umpire must assume that the ball would have continued on the same trajectory after striking the batter, even if it would have bounced before hitting the stumps.

A batter can be out lbw even if the ball did not hit their leg: for example, a batter struck on the head could be lbw, although this situation is extremely rare. However, the batter cannot be lbw if the ball pitches on the leg side of the stumps ("outside leg stump"), (Note: For a right-handed batter, the leg side is the left-hand side of the pitch when viewed from his perspective. For a left-handed batter, the leg side is the right-hand side.) even if the ball would have otherwise hit the wickets. Similarly, a batter who has attempted to hit the ball with their bat cannot be lbw if the ball strikes them outside the line of off stump. However, some shots in cricket, such as the switch hit or reverse sweep, involve the batter switching between a right- and left-handed stance; this affects the location of the off and leg side, which are determined by the stance. The law explicitly states that the off side is determined by the batter's stance when the bowler commences their run-up.

External image
- BBC slide show illustrating the lbw law

According to MCC guidelines for umpires, factors to consider when giving an lbw decision include the angle at which the ball was travelling and whether the ball was swinging through the air. The umpire must also account for the height of the ball at impact and how far from the wicket the batter was standing; from this information they must determine if the ball would have passed over the stumps or struck them. The MCC guidance states that it is easier to make a decision when the ball strikes the batter without pitching, but that the difficulty increases when the ball has bounced and more so when there is a shorter time between the ball pitching and striking the batter.

== Development of the law ==
=== Origins ===
The earliest known written version of the Laws of Cricket, dating from 1744, does not include an lbw rule. At the time, batters in English cricket used curved bats, which made it unlikely that they would be able to stand directly in front of the wickets. However, a clause in the 1744 laws gave umpires the power to take action if the batter was "standing unfair to strike". Cricket bats were modified to become straighter over the following years, allowing batters to stand closer to the wickets. Subsequently, some players deliberately began to obstruct the ball from hitting the wickets. Such tactics were criticised by writers and a revision of the laws in 1774 ruled that the batter was out if he deliberately stopped the ball from hitting the wicket with his leg. However, critics noted that the umpires were left the difficult task of interpreting the intentions of batters. The 1788 version of the laws no longer required the umpires to take account of the batter's intent; now a batter was lbw if he stopped a ball that "pitch[ed] straight". Further clarification of the law came in 1823, when a condition was added that "the ball must be delivered in a straight line to the wicket". The ambiguity of the wording was highlighted when two prominent umpires disagreed over whether the ball had to travel in a straight line from the bowler to the wicket, or between the wickets at either end of the pitch. In 1839 the MCC, by then responsible for drafting the Laws of Cricket, endorsed the latter interpretation and ruled the batter out lbw if the ball pitched in between the wickets and would have hit the stumps. (Note: According to the 1839 law, "... if with any part of his person he stops the ball, which in the opinion of the umpire at the bowler's end shall have been delivered in a straight line from it to the striker's wicket and would have hit it".)

=== Controversy and attempted reform ===
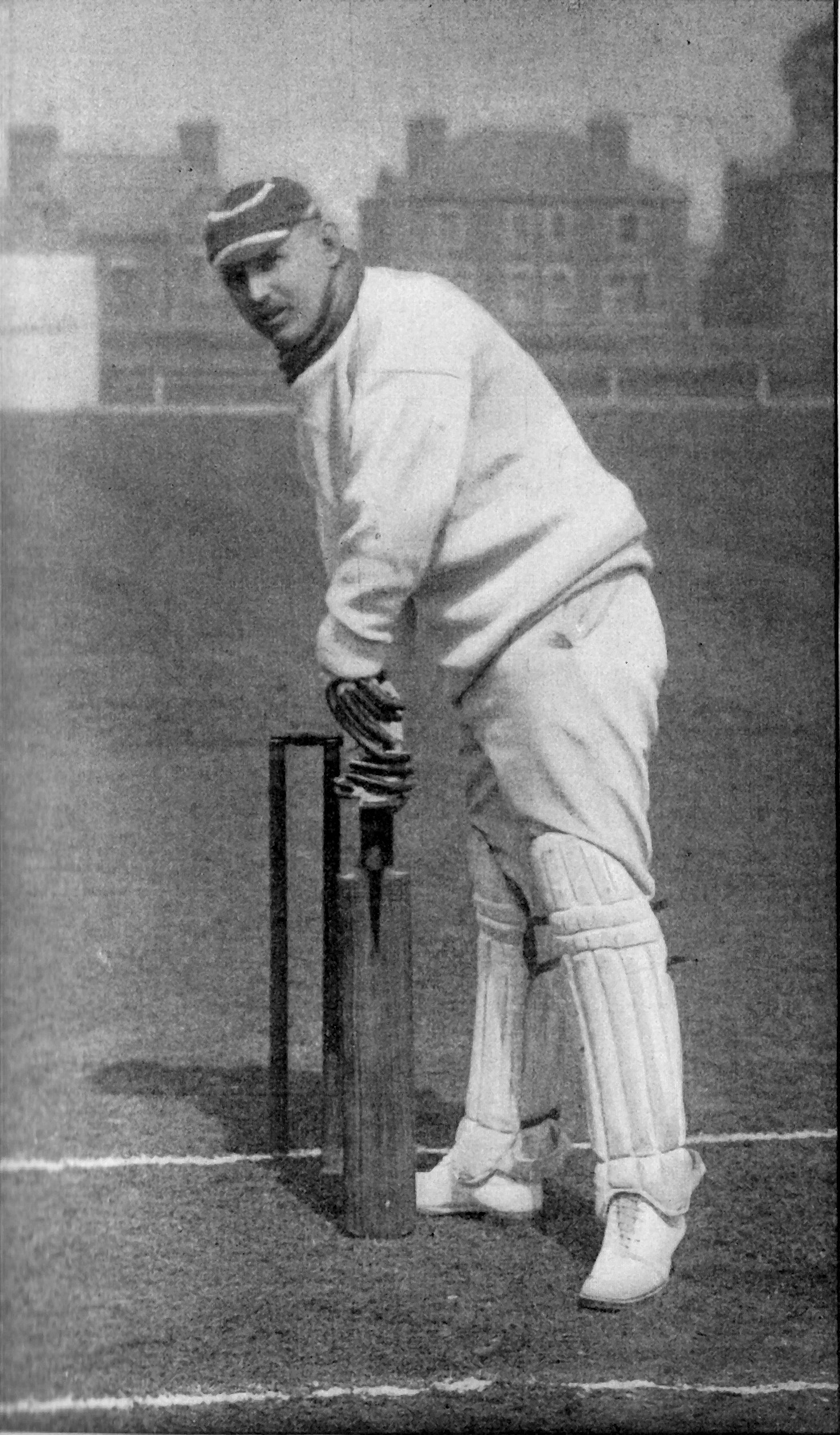
Arthur Shrewsbury, one of the first batters to use his pads to prevent the ball hitting his wicket

In essence, the lbw law remained the same between 1839 and 1937, despite several campaigns to have it changed. An 1863 proposal to allow a batter to be lbw if the ball hit his body at any point between the wickets, regardless of where the ball pitched or whether it would hit the wicket at all, came to nothing. There were few complaints until the proportion of lbw dismissals in county cricket began to increase during the 1880s. Until then, batters used their pads only to protect their legs; their use for any other purposes was considered unsporting, and some amateur cricketers did not wear them at all. As cricket became more organised and competitive, some batters began to use their pads as a second line of defence: they lined them up with the ball so that if they missed with the bat, the ball struck the pad instead of the wicket. Some players took this further; if the delivery was not an easy one from which to score runs, they attempted no shot and allowed the ball to bounce safely off their pads. Arthur Shrewsbury was the first prominent player to use such methods, and others followed. Criticism of this practice was heightened by the increased quality and reliability of cricket pitches, which made batting easier, led to higher scores and created a perceived imbalance in the game.

Several proposals were made to prevent pad-play. At a meeting of representatives of the main county cricket clubs in 1888, one representative expressed the opinion that a "batsman who defended his wicket with his body instead of with his bat should be punished". The representatives supported a motion to alter the law to state that the batters would be out if he stopped a ball that would have hit the wicket; (Note: According to the 1888 proposal, "A batsman shall be out if with any part of his person, being in the straight line from wicket to wicket, he stop a ball which in the opinion of the umpire would have hit the wicket.") in contrast to the existing wording, this took no account of where the ball pitched relative to the wickets. Further proposals included one in which the intent of the batter was taken into account, but no laws were changed and the MCC merely issued a condemnation of the practice of using pads for defence. This reduced pad-play for a short time, but when it increased again, a second pronouncement by the MCC had little effect.

Further discussion on altering the law took place in 1899, when several prominent cricketers supported an amendment similar to the 1888 proposal: the batter would be out if the ball would have hit the wicket, where it pitched was irrelevant. At a Special General Meeting of the MCC in 1902, Alfred Lyttelton formally proposed this amendment; the motion was supported by 259 votes to 188, but failed to secure the two-thirds majority required to change the laws. A. G. Steel was the principal opponent of the change, as he believed it would make the task of the umpires too difficult, but he later regretted his stance. Lyttelton's brother, Robert, supported the alteration and campaigned for the rest of his life to have the lbw law altered. As evidence that pad-play was increasing and needed to be curtailed, he cited the growing number of wickets which were falling lbw: the proportion rose from 2% of dismissals in 1870 to 6% in 1890, and 12% in 1923. In 1902, the proposed new law was tried in the Minor Counties Championship, but deemed a failure. An increase in the size of the stumps was one of several other rejected proposals at this time to reduce the dominance of batters over bowlers.

=== Alteration to the law ===
Between 1900 and the 1930s, the number of runs scored by batters, and the proportion of lbw dismissals, continued to rise. Bowlers grew increasingly frustrated with pad-play and the extent to which batters refused to play shots at bowling directed outside the off stump, simply allowing it to pass by. The English fast bowler Harold Larwood responded by targeting leg stump, frequently hitting the batter with the ball in the process. This developed into the controversial Bodyline tactics he used against Australia in 1932–33. Some batters began to go further and preferred to kick away balls pitched outside off stump—reaching out to kick the ball instead of allowing it to hit their pads—if they presented any threat, knowing that they could not be dismissed lbw. The authorities believed these developments represented poor entertainment value. At the height of the Bodyline controversy in 1933, Donald Bradman, the leading Australian batter and primary target of the English bowlers, wrote to the MCC recommending an alteration of the lbw law to create more exciting games.

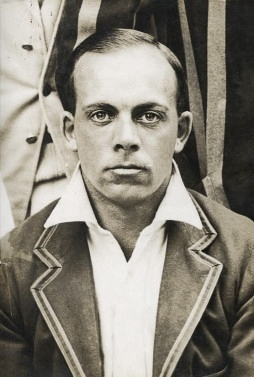
Bob Wyatt opposed the revision of the lbw law in 1935 and campaigned against it until his death.

To address the problem, and redress the balance for bowlers, the MCC made some alterations to the laws. The size of the ball was reduced in 1927, and that of the stumps increased in 1931, but the changes had little effect. Between 1929 and 1933, county authorities conducted a trial in which a batter could be lbw if he had hit the ball onto his pads. Then, in 1935, an experimental law was introduced in which the batter could be dismissed lbw even if the ball pitched outside the line of off stump—in other words, a ball that turned or swung into the batter but did not pitch in line with the wickets. However, the ball was still required to strike the batter in line with the wickets. The umpire signalled to the scorers when he declared a batter out under the new rule, and any such dismissal was designated "lbw (n)" on the scorecard.

Several leading batters opposed the new law, including the professional Herbert Sutcliffe, known as an exponent of pad-play, and amateurs Errol Holmes and Bob Wyatt. Wisden Cricketers' Almanack noted that these three improved their batting records during the 1935 season, but batters generally were less successful. There were also fewer drawn matches. There was an increase in the number of lbws— out of 1,560 lbw dismissals in first-class matches in 1935, 483 were given under the amended law. Wisden judged the experiment a success and several of its opponents changed their mind by the end of the season; batters soon became accustomed to the alteration. Although Australian authorities were less convinced, and did not immediately introduce the revision into domestic first-class cricket, in 1937 the new rule became part of the Laws of Cricket.

According to Gerald Brodribb, in his survey and history of the Laws, the change produced more "enterprising", exciting cricket but any alteration in outlook was halted by the Second World War. When the sport resumed in 1946, batters were out of practice and the amended lbw law played into the hands of off spin and inswing bowlers, who began to dominate county cricket. The cricket historian Derek Birley notes that many of these bowlers imitated the methods of Alec Bedser, an inswing bowler who was successful immediately after the war, but that the resulting cricket was unexciting to watch. The revised lbw law, and other alterations in the game in favour of the bowler, further encouraged such bowling. The new law continued to provoke debate among writers and cricketers; many former players claimed that the alteration had caused a deterioration in batting and reduced the number of shots played on the off side. A 1963 report in The Times blamed the law for reducing the variety of bowling styles: "the change has led to a steady increase in the amount of seam and off-spin bowling. Whereas in the early thirties every county had a leg spinner and an orthodox left arm spinner, leg spinners, at any rate, are now few and far between. Walk on to any of the first-class grounds at any time tomorrow and the chances are that you will see the wicketkeeper standing back and a medium pace bowler in action ... there is little doubt that the game, as a spectacle, is less attractive than it was." Several critics, including Bob Wyatt, maintained that the lbw law should be returned to its pre-1935 wording; he campaigned to do so until his death in 1995. On the other hand, Bradman, in the 1950s, proposed extending the law so that batters could be lbw even if they were struck outside the line of off stump. An MCC study of the state of cricket, carried out in 1956 and 1957, examined the prevalent and unpopular tactic involving off-spin and inswing bowlers aiming at leg stump with fielders concentrated on the leg side. Rather than alter the lbw law to combat the problem, the MCC reduced the number of fielders allowed on the leg side.

=== Playing no stroke ===
In the 1950s and 1960s, the amount of pad-play increased, owing to more difficult and unpredictable pitches that made batting much harder. Critics continued to regard this tactic as "negative and unfair". In an effort to discourage pad-play and encourage leg spin bowling, a new variant of the lbw law was introduced, initially in Australia and the West Indies in the 1969–70 season, then in England for 1970. Under the re-worded law, a batter would be lbw if a ball destined to hit the stumps pitched in line with the wickets or "outside a batter's off stump and in the opinion of the umpire he made no genuine attempt to play the ball with his bat". This revision omitted the requirement that the impact should be in line with the wickets, but meant that any batter playing a shot could not be out if the ball pitched outside off stump, in contrast to the 1935 law. The editor of Wisden believed the change encouraged batters to take more risks, and had produced more attractive cricket. However, the proportion of wickets falling lbw sharply declined, and concerns were expressed in Australia. The Australian authorities proposed a reversion to the previous law. A batter could once more be out to a ball that pitched outside off stump, but a provision was added that "if no stroke is offered to a ball pitching outside the off-stump which in the opinion of the umpire would hit the stumps, but hits the batter on any part of his person other than the hand, then the batter is out, even if that part of the person hit is not in line between wicket and wicket". The difference to the 1935 rule was that the batter could now be out even if the ball struck outside the line of off-stump. This wording was adopted throughout the world from 1972, although it was not yet part of the official Laws, and the percentage of lbws sharply increased to beyond the levels preceding the 1970 change. The MCC added the revised wording to the Laws of Cricket in 1980; this version of the lbw law is still used as of 2013.

=== Effects of technology ===
Since 1993, the proportion of lbws in each English season has risen steadily. According to cricket historian Douglas Miller, the percentage of lbw dismissals increased after broadcasters incorporated ball-tracking technology such as Hawk-Eye into their television coverage of matches. Miller writes: "With the passage of time and the adoption of Hawkeye into other sports, together with presentations demonstrating its accuracy, cricket followers seem gradually to have accepted its predictions. Replay analyses have shown that a greater proportion of balls striking an outstretched leg go on to hit the wicket than had once been expected." He also suggests that umpires have been influenced by such evidence; their greater understanding of which deliveries are likely to hit the stumps has made them more likely to rule out batters who are standing further away from the stumps. This trend is replicated in international cricket, where the increasing use of technology in reviewing decisions has altered the attitude of umpires. Spin bowlers in particular win far more appeals for lbw. However, the use of on-field technology has proved controversial; some critics regard it as more reliable than human judgement, while others believe that the umpire is better placed to make the decision.

The International Cricket Council (ICC), responsible for running the game worldwide, conducted a trial in 2002 where lbw appeals could be referred to a match official, the third umpire, to review on television replays. The third umpire could only use technology to determine where the ball had pitched and if the batter hit the ball with his/her bat. The ICC judged the experiment unsuccessful and did not pursue it. More trials followed in 2006, although ball-tracking technology remained unavailable to match officials. After a further series of trials, in 2009 the Umpire Decision Review System (DRS) was brought into international cricket where teams could refer the on-field decisions of umpires to a third umpire who had access to television replays and technology such as ball tracking. According to the ICC's general manager, Dave Richardson, DRS increased the frequency with which umpires awarded lbw decisions. In a 2012 interview, he said: "Umpires may have realised that if they give someone out and DRS shows it was not out, then their decision can be rectified. So they might, I suppose, have the courage of their convictions a bit more and take a less conservative approach to giving the batter out. I think if we're totally honest, DRS has affected the game slightly more than we thought it would."

Critics of the system suggest that rules for the use of DRS have created an inconsistency of approach to lbw decisions depending on the circumstances of the referral. Opponents also doubt that the ball-tracking technology used in deciding lbws is reliable enough, but the ICC state that tests have shown the system to be 100% accurate. The Board of Control for Cricket in India (BCCI) initially declined to use DRS in matches involving India owing to their concerns regarding the ball-tracking technology. Early DRS trials were conducted during India matches, and several problems arose over lbws, particularly as the equipment was not as advanced as it later became. The BCCI believed the technology is unreliable and open to manipulation. However, as of 2016 they have accepted it.

== Trends and perception ==
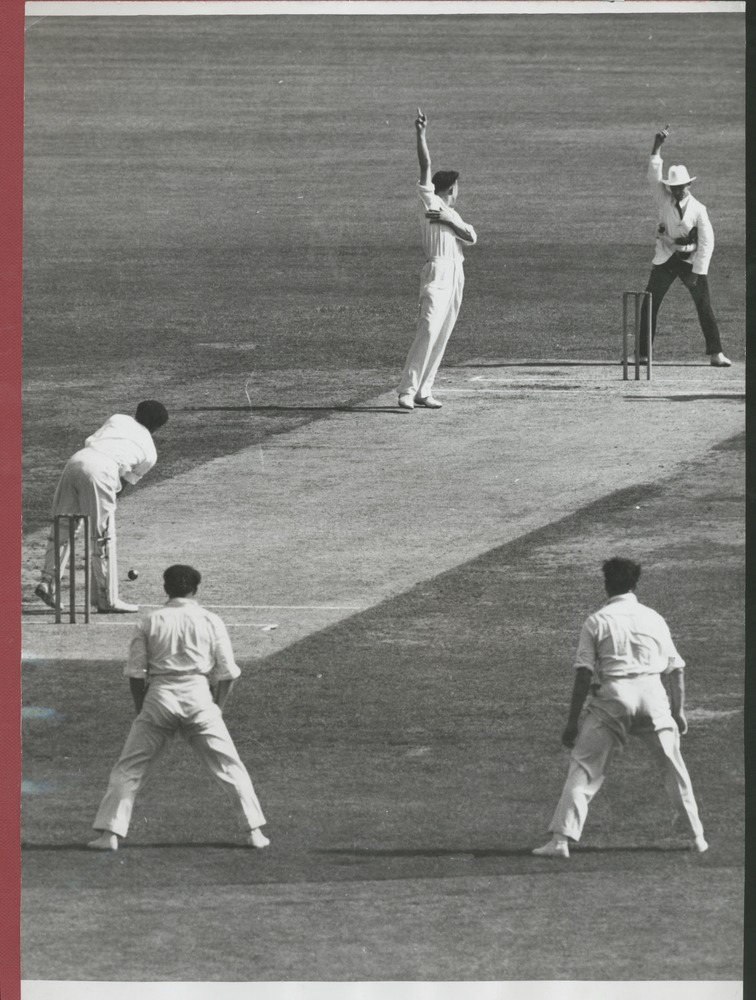
Hemu Adhikari is given out lbw to Bill Johnston, India v. Australia, 1947–48

A study in 2011 by Douglas Miller shows that in English county cricket, the proportion of wickets to fall lbw has increased steadily since the First World War. In the 1920s, around 11% of wickets were lbw but this rose to 14% in the 1930s. Between 1946 and 1970, the proportion was approximately 11% but subsequently increased until reaching almost 19% in the decade before 2010. Miller also states that captains of county teams were statistically more likely to receive the benefit of lbw decisions—less likely to be out lbw when batting and more likely to dismiss batters lbw when bowling. For many years, county captains submitted end-of-match reports on the umpires; as umpires were professionals whose careers could be affected, captains consequently received leeway whether batting or bowling. Before 1963, when the status was abolished in county cricket, umpires were also more lenient towards amateur cricketers. Amateurs administered English cricket, and offending one could end an umpire's career. Elsewhere in the world, lbws are more statistically likely in matches taking place on the Indian subcontinent. However, batters from the subcontinent were less likely to be lbw wherever they played in the world.

Teams that toured other countries often became frustrated by lbws given against them; there was often an assumption of national bias by home umpires against visiting teams. Several studies investigating this perception have suggested that home batters are sometimes less likely than visiting batters to be lbw. However, the data is based on lbw decisions awarded, not on the success-rate of appeals to the umpire. Fraser points out that it is impossible to determine from these studies if any of the decisions were wrong, particularly as the lbw law can have different interpretations, or if other factors such as pitch conditions and technique were involved. A 2006 study examined the effect that neutral umpires had on the rate of lbws. (Note: From the early 1990s, one of the two umpires in many Tests was from a neutral country, and this became a requirement in 1995; after 2002, both umpires had to be neutral. During 2020, this was revised due to the Coronavirus Pandemic such that home umpries could be used, but each team had an extra review to use the technology) Although the reasons were again ambiguous, it found that lbws increased slightly under neutral umpires regardless of team or location.

Among those who do not follow cricket, the law has the reputation of being extremely difficult to understand, of equivalent complexity to association football's offside rule. Owing to the difficulty of its interpretation, lbw is regarded by critics as the most controversial of the laws but also a yardstick by which an umpire's abilities are judged. In his book Cricket and the Law: The Man in White Is Always Right, David Fraser writes that umpires' lbw decisions are frequently criticised and "arguments about bias and incompetence in adjudication inform almost every discussion about lbw decisions". Problems arise because the umpire has not only to establish what has happened but also to speculate over what might have occurred. Controversial aspects of lbw decisions include the umpire having to determine whether the ball pitched outside leg stump, and in certain circumstances whether the batter intended to hit the ball or leave it alone. Umpires are frequently criticised for their lbw decisions by players, commentators and spectators. Historically, trouble ranging from protests and arguments to crowd demonstrations occasionally arose from disputed decisions. For example, a prolonged crowd disturbance, in which items were thrown onto the playing field and the match was delayed, took place when Mohammad Azharuddin was adjudged lbw during a 1996 One Day International in India.

== Bibliography ==
- Birley, Derek (1999). A Social History of English Cricket. London: Aurum Press. ISBN 1-85410-941-3.
- Brodribb, Gerald (1995). Next Man In: A Survey of Cricket Laws and Customs. London: Souvenir Press. ISBN 0-285-63294-9.
- Crowe, S. M.; Middeldorp, Jennifer (1996). "A Comparison of Leg Before Wicket Rates Between Australians and Their Visiting Teams for Test Cricket Series Played in Australia, 1977–94". Journal of the Royal Statistical Society, Series D. 45 (2). Oxford: Blackwell: 255. doi:10.2307/2988414. ISSN 0039-0526. JSTOR 2988414.
- Fraser, David (2005). Cricket and the Law: The man in white is always right. London: Routledge. ISBN 0-203-48594-7.
- Frith, David (2002). Bodyline Autopsy. The full story of the most sensational Test cricket series: Australia v England 1932–33. London: Aurum Press. ISBN 1-85410-896-4.
- Marshall, Michael (1987). Gentlemen and Players: Conversations with Cricketers. London: Grafton Books. ISBN 0-246-11874-1.
- Miller, Douglas (March 2011). "Leg Before Wicket" (PDF). The Cricket Statistician (153). Nottingham: Association of Cricket Statisticians and Historians.
- Ringrose, Trevor J. (October 2006). "Neutral umpires and leg before wicket decisions in test cricket". Journal of the Royal Statistical Society, Series A. 169 (4). Oxford: Blackwell: 903–911. doi:10.1111/j.1467-985X.2006.00433.x. S2CID 119615330.
