= John Burges (physician, born 1745) =

English physician

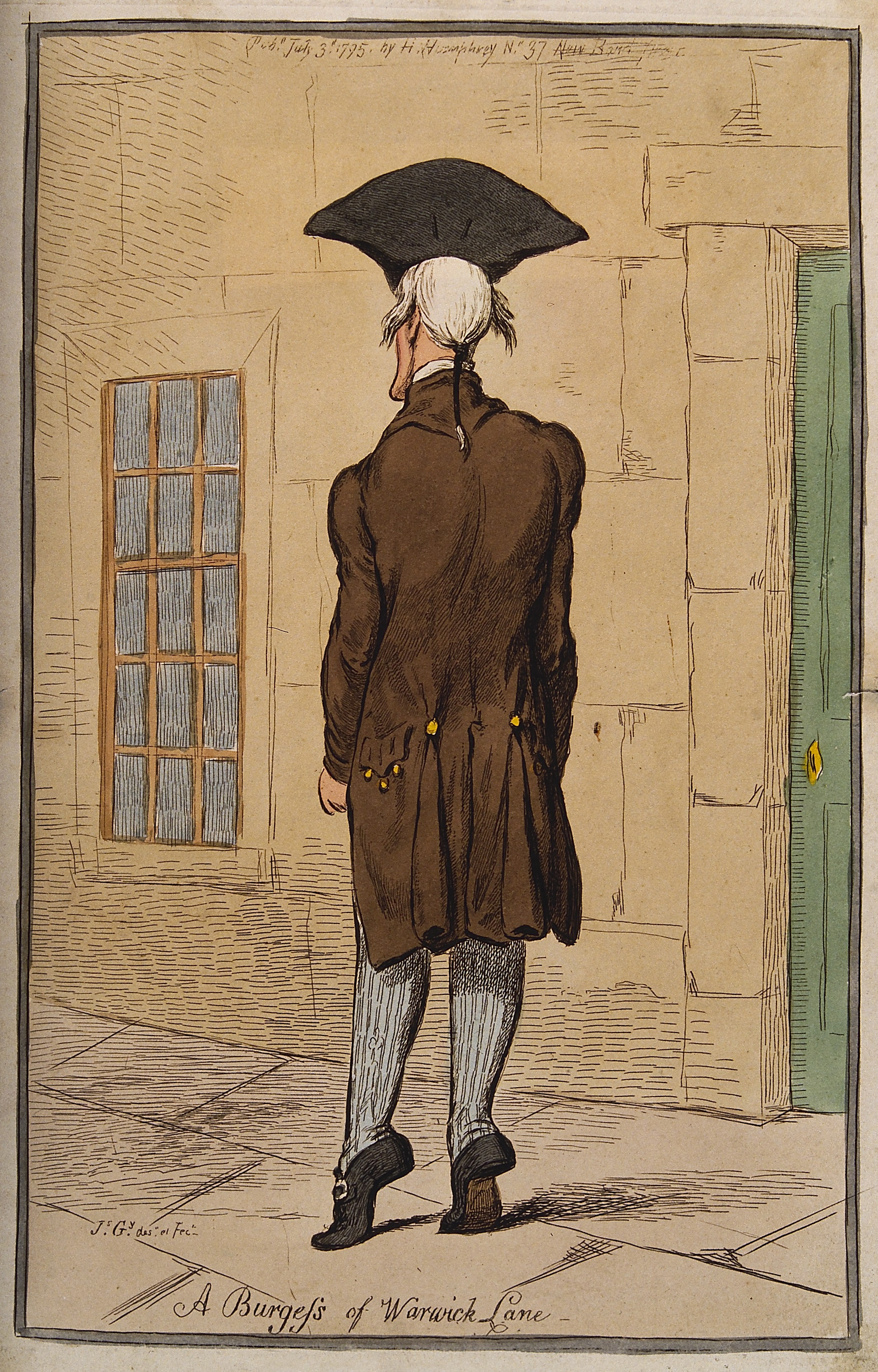
- Born: 1745; London
- Died: 1807 (aged 61–62)
- Occupation: Physician

John Burges (1745 – 1807) was an English physician.

== Biography ==
Burges was born in London in 1745, and educated at Westminster and Christ Church, Oxford. The dates of his degrees are B.A. 1764, M.A. 1767, M.B. 1770, M.D. 1774. He became a fellow of the College of Physicians 1775, was censor six times between 1776 and 1797, and an elect 1797. He held office as physician to St. George's Hospital from 1774 to 1787. As his health was delicate, he did not attempt general practice. He gave several gratuitous lectures on scientific subjects. His chief occupations were the study and the collection of the materia medica. In forming his collection he received much assistance from his relative, Sir James Bland Burges, sometime under-secretary in the foreign office. At his death, in 1807, he left his collection to Mr. E. A. Brande, who in 1809 presented it to the College of Physicians. It has since been considerably increased by gifts and purchases.
