= Archibald Montgomerie, 13th Earl of Eglinton =

British politician (1812–1861)

The Right Honourable The Earl of Eglinton KT PC
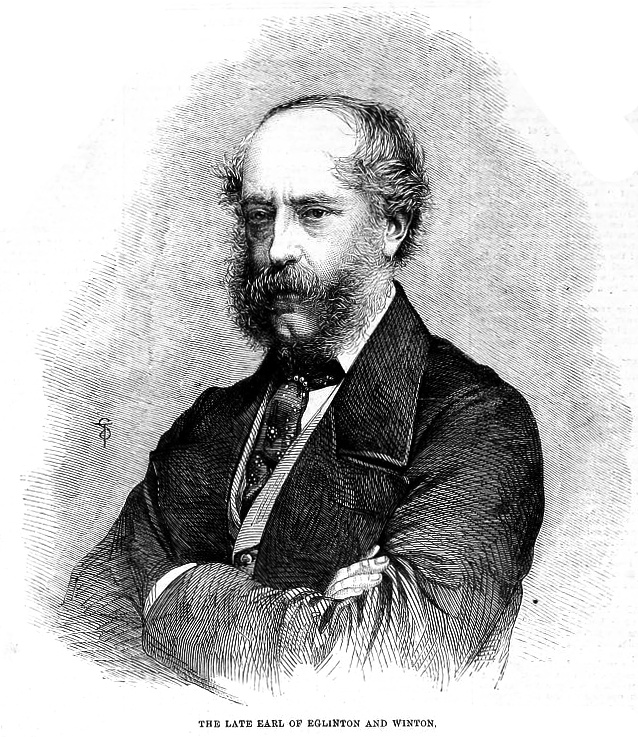

Lord Lieutenant of Ireland
- In office 1 March 1852 – 17 December 1852
- Monarch: Queen Victoria
- Prime Minister: The Earl of Derby
- Preceded by: The Earl of Clarendon
- Succeeded by: The Earl of St Germans
- In office 8 March 1858 – 11 June 1859
- Monarch: Queen Victoria
- Prime Minister: The Earl of Derby
- Preceded by: The Earl of Carlisle
- Succeeded by: The Earl of Carlisle

Personal details
- Born: 29 September 1812 Palermo, Sicily
- Died: 4 October 1861 (aged 49) Mount Melville House
- Party: Conservative
- Spouse(s): Hon. Theresa Newcomen (died 1853) Lady Adela Caroline Harriett Capell (m. 1858; died 1860)
- Children: 6, including Archibald, Seton, and George
- Education: Eton College

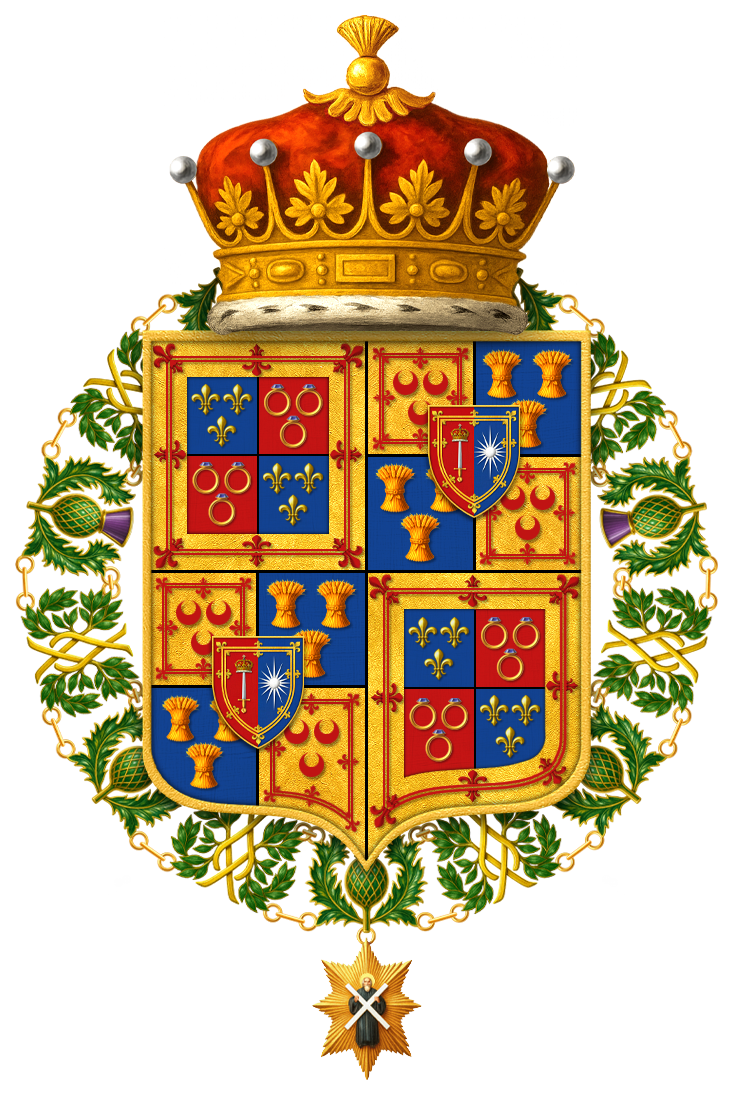
Shield of Arms of Archibald William Montgomerie, 13th Earl of Eglinton, 1st Earl of Winton, KT, PC

Archibald William Montgomerie, 13th Earl of Eglinton, 1st Earl of Winton, KT, PC (29 September 1812 – 4 October 1861), styled Lord Montgomerie from 1814 to 1819, was a British Conservative politician. He was Lord Lieutenant of Ireland in 1852 and again from 1858 to 1859.

== Early life ==
Eglinton was born in Palermo, Sicily, the son of Major-General Archibald Montgomerie, Lord Montgomerie (30 July 1773 – 4 January 1814), the eldest son of Hugh Montgomerie, 12th Earl of Eglinton. His mother was Lady Mary Montgomerie (died 1848), daughter of General Archibald Montgomerie, 11th Earl of Eglinton. After his father's death, his mother married Sir Charles Lamb, 2nd Baronet.

He was educated at Eton. As a pastime he enjoyed playing golf. One of his playing partners was James Ogilvie Fairlie.

== Career ==
Eglinton was a staunch Tory. In 1846, he was a whip in the House of Lords; on 28 May 1846, he spoke against the Corn Importation Bill; in May 1848 he opposed the Jewish Disabilities Bill.

In February 1852, he became Lord Lieutenant of Ireland under the Earl of Derby. He retired with the ministry in the following December. When Derby returned to office in February 1858 he was again appointed Lord-Lieutenant, and he discharged the duties of this post until June 1859.

In this year he was created Earl of Wintoun, an earldom which had been held by his kinsfolk, the Setons, from 1600 until 1716, when George Seton, 5th Earl of Wintoun, was deprived of his honours for high treason. Anstruther gives the date for this creation as 1840. The Earl's kinswoman, Georgina Talbot, in celebration of the restoration of the title, gave the slightly altered name 'Winton' to a residential development in Bournemouth (then in Hampshire, now in Dorset) which she was creating at the time.

=== Horse racing ===
Lord Eglinton's main object of interest for some years was the turf; he kept a large racing stud and won success and reputation in the sporting world. His most successful horse was The Flying Dutchman which won The Derby and St Leger Stakes in 1849.

=== The Eglinton Tournament ===
In 1839, Lord Eglinton's name became more widely known in connection with the Eglinton Tournament. This took place at Eglinton castle and is said to have cost him £30,000 or £40,000. Contemporary ridicule is better remembered today than its successes.

It was partly spoiled by the unfavourable weather, the rain falling in torrents, but it was a real tournament, participants having attended regular training during the course of the year prior and lances being broken in the orthodox way. Prince Louis Napoleon (Napoleon III) and Lady Seymour, a granddaughter of Richard Brinsley Sheridan and the wife of Lord Seymour, afterwards 12th Duke of Somerset, took part.

A list of the challengers with an account of the jousts and the mêlée will be found in the volume on the tournament written by the Reverend John Richardson, with drawings by James Henry Nixon (1843). It was also described in Disraeli's Endymion.

== Personal life ==
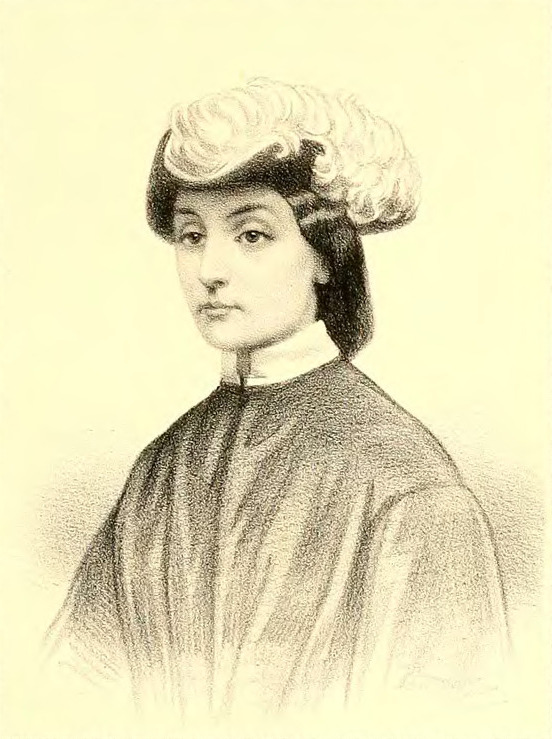
Memorial to his second wife, Hon. Adela Caroline Harriett.

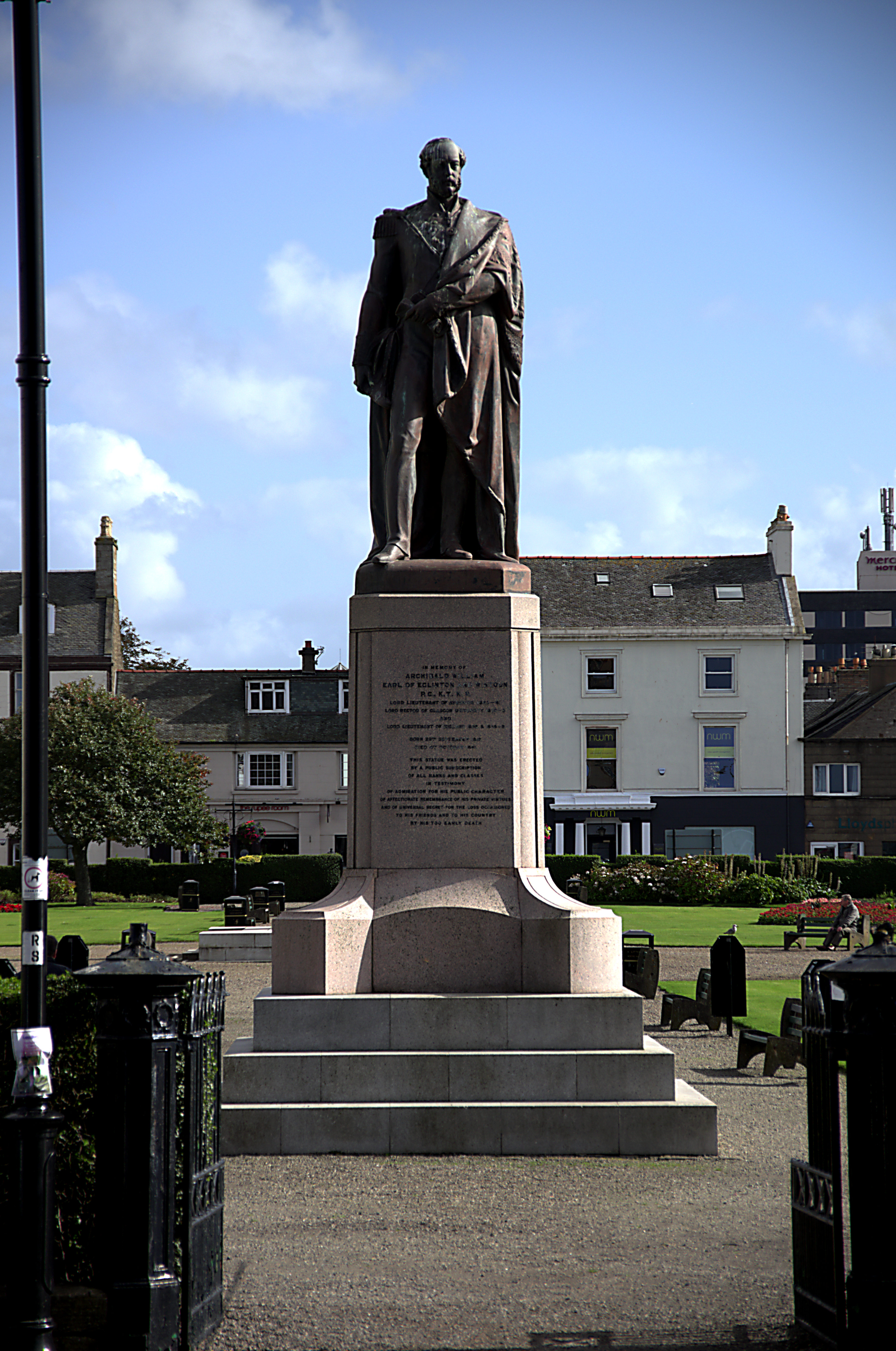
His statue in Ayr

Lord Eglinton married, firstly, on 17 February 1841, Theresa Howe Cockerell, née Newcomen, widow of Captain Richard Howe Cockerell RN (1798–1839, buried Park St, Calcutta). Mrs Cockerell was an illegitimate daughter (out of 8 children) of Thomas Gleadowe-Newcomen, 2nd Viscount Newcomen (1776–1825) and his long-term mistress Harriet Holland. Theresa Newcomen was born in Calcutta in 1809, and died on 16 December 1853 at Eglinton Castle. They had the following children:

- Archibald Montgomerie, 14th Earl of Eglinton (1841–1892)
- Lady Egidia Montgomerie (c. 1843–1880), who married Frederick Thellusson, 5th Baron Rendlesham.
- Hon. Seton Montolieu Montgomerie (1846–1883), who married and left daughters.
- George Montgomerie, 15th Earl of Eglinton (1848–1919), ancestor of the present Earl.

According to Eglinton's entry in the Oxford Dictionary of National Biography, as cited here, this marriage was the great mistake of his life. However, his stepdaughter Anna Theresa Cockerell (1836–1912), aided by her mother's second marriage, went on to marry Charles Chetwynd-Talbot, 19th Earl of Shrewsbury.

After Theresa's death in December 1853, her widower married, secondly, the Hon. Adela Caroline Harriett, daughter of Arthur Capell, 6th Earl of Essex, in 1858. They had the following children:

- Lady Sybil Amelia Montgomerie (d. 1932)
- Lady Hilda Rose Montgomerie (d. 1928), who married Tonman Mosley, 1st Baron Anslow and died at Bangors, Iver, Buckinghamshire.

Lady Adela died in December 1860, aged only 32. Lord Eglinton survived her by less than a year before dying at Mount Melville House, near St. Andrews, on 4 October 1861, and was buried in the family vault at Kilwinning, Ayrshire, on 11 October 1861. He was succeeded by his eldest son Archibald.

=== Legacy ===
A statue of Lord Eglinton was erected in St Stephen's Green, Dublin in 1866 and was destroyed in an explosion by the IRA in 1958.

In New Zealand, Mount Eglinton and the Eglinton River are named in his honor.

== See also ==
- Eglinton Country Park
- Eglinton Tournament Bridge

== Notes ==
Attribution:

- This article incorporates text from a publication now in the public domain: Barker, George Fisher Russell (1894). "Montgomerie, Archibald William". In Lee, Sidney (ed.). Dictionary of National Biography. Vol. 38. London: Smith, Elder & Co.

Government offices
Preceded by The Earl of Clarendon	Lord Lieutenant of Ireland; 1852	Succeeded by The Earl of St Germans
Preceded by The Earl of Carlisle	Lord Lieutenant of Ireland; 1858–1859	Succeeded by The Earl of Carlisle
Honorary titles
Preceded by The Earl of Glasgow	Lord Lieutenant of Ayrshire; 1842–1861	Succeeded by The Marquess of Ailsa
Academic offices
Unknown	Rector of Marischal College, Aberdeen; 1851–1853	Succeeded by The Earl of Carlisle
Preceded by Sir Archibald Alison, Bt	Rector of the University of Glasgow; 1852–1854	Succeeded by The Duke of Argyll
Peerage of the United Kingdom
New creation	Earl of Winton; 1859–1861	Succeeded by Archibald Montgomerie
Peerage of Scotland
Preceded by Hugh Montgomerie	Earl of Eglinton; 1819–1861	Succeeded by Archibald Montgomerie
