= John Purcell (MP) =

John Purcell (died 1665) was a Welsh politician who sat in the House of Commons from 1660 to 1665.

Purcell was of Nantcribba near Montgomery, and was possibly the son of Edward Purcell and his wife Mary Pryse daughter of Sir Richard Pryse of Gogerddan.

In 1660, Purcell was elected Member of Parliament for Montgomeryshire in the Convention Parliament. In 1661 he was elected MP for Montgomery and was seated after a double return. He sat in the Cavalier Parliament until his death in 1665
