= Mount Eglinton =

Mountain in New Zealand

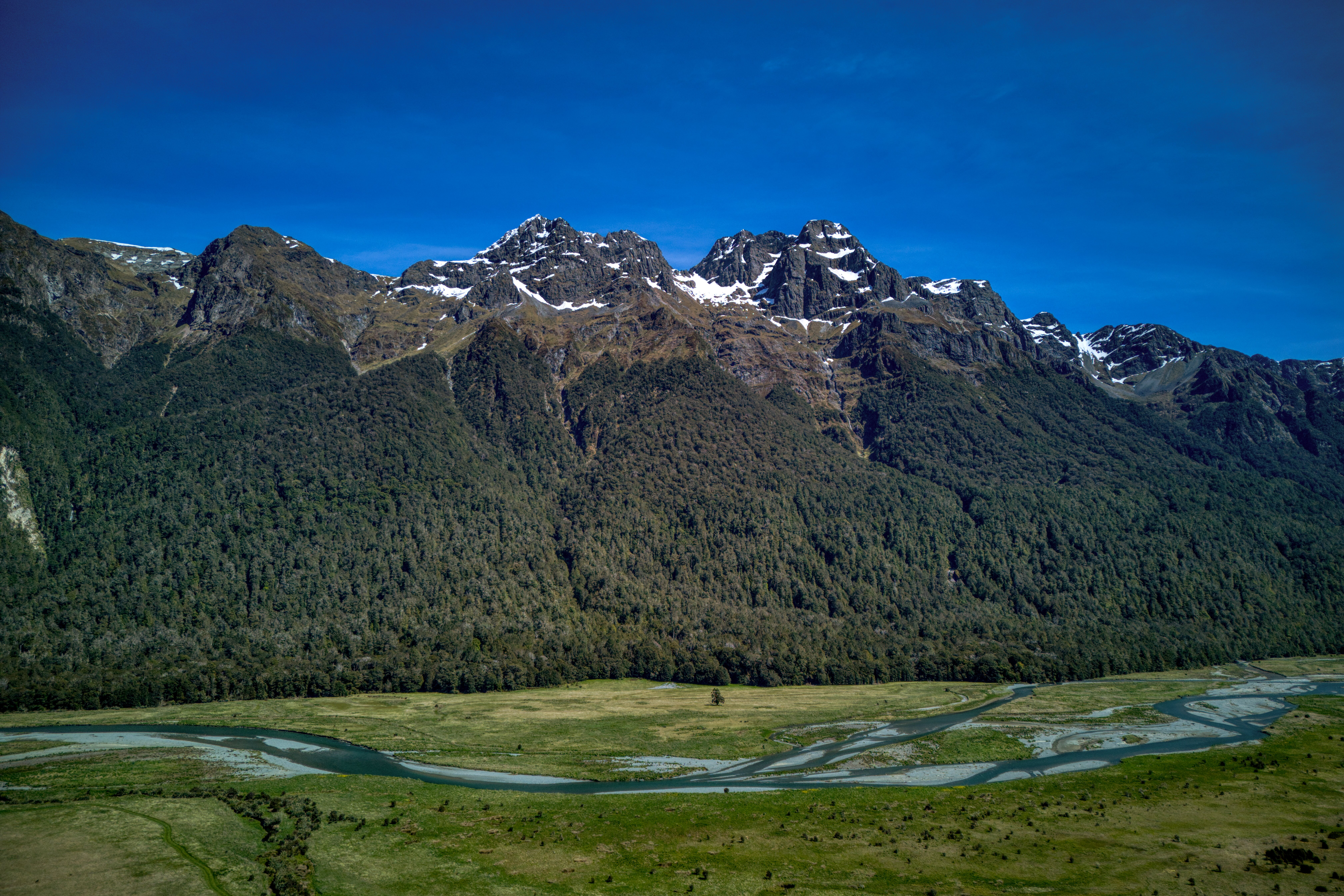
- East aspect and Eglinton Valley

Highest point
- Elevation: 1,854 m (6,083 ft)
- Prominence: 606 m (1,988 ft)
- Isolation: 11.44 km (7.11 mi)
- Coordinates: 45°01′04″S 167°58′18″E

Naming
- Etymology: Archibald Montgomerie, 13th Earl of Eglinton

Geography
- Location within New Zealand
- Interactive map of Mount Eglinton
- Location: South Island
- Country: New Zealand
- Region: Southland
- Protected area: Fiordland National Park
- Parent range: Southern Alps; Earl Mountains
- Topo map: NZTopo50 CC08

Geology
- Rock age: Permian
- Rock type: Igneous rock

Mount Eglinton is an 1,854-metre-elevation (6,083-foot) mountain summit in Fiordland, New Zealand.

== Description ==
Mount Eglinton is part of the Earl Mountains, and is situated in the Southland Region of South Island. It is set within Fiordland National Park which is part of the Te Wahipounamu UNESCO World Heritage Site. Precipitation runoff from the mountain drains west to Lake Te Anau and east into the Eglinton River. Topographic relief is significant as the summit rises 1,410 metres (4,626 feet) above the Eglinton Valley in two kilometres. The mountain is composed of volcanic rock and the lower slopes are covered by a beech forest. The mountain can be seen from State Highway 94 at Mirror Lakes.

== Etymology ==
The mountain was named in 1861 or 1862 by surveyor James McKerrow to honour Archibald Montgomerie, 13th Earl of Eglinton (1812–1861), a British Conservative politician and Lord Lieutenant of Ireland. The toponym has appeared in publications since 1864, and has been officially approved by the New Zealand Geographic Board.

== Climate ==
Based on the Köppen climate classification, Mount Eglinton is located in a marine west coast climate zone. Prevailing westerly winds blow moist air from the Tasman Sea onto the mountain, where the air is forced upward by the mountains (orographic lift), causing moisture to drop in the form of prodigious rain. The months of December through February offer the most favourable weather for viewing or climbing this peak. Climate data for Eglinton Knobs Flat which is five kilometres north-northeast of Mount Eglinton:

Climate data for Eglinton Knobs Flat, elevation 365 m (1,198 ft), (1991–2020)
Month	Jan	Feb	Mar	Apr	May	Jun	Jul	Aug	Sep	Oct	Nov	Dec	Year
Mean daily maximum °C (°F)	19.8 (67.6)	20.0 (68.0)	17.7 (63.9)	14.1 (57.4)	10.7 (51.3)	7.9 (46.2)	7.4 (45.3)	9.9 (49.8)	12.2 (54.0)	14.4 (57.9)	16.3 (61.3)	18.8 (65.8)	14.1 (57.4)
Daily mean °C (°F)	14.1 (57.4)	14.0 (57.2)	12.1 (53.8)	9.1 (48.4)	6.7 (44.1)	3.8 (38.8)	3.4 (38.1)	5.1 (41.2)	7.1 (44.8)	8.8 (47.8)	10.7 (51.3)	13.1 (55.6)	9.0 (48.2)
Mean daily minimum °C (°F)	8.4 (47.1)	8.0 (46.4)	6.5 (43.7)	4.2 (39.6)	2.6 (36.7)	−0.2 (31.6)	−0.5 (31.1)	0.3 (32.5)	1.9 (35.4)	3.2 (37.8)	5.1 (41.2)	7.5 (45.5)	3.9 (39.1)
Average rainfall mm (inches)	224.5 (8.84)	155.6 (6.13)	143.5 (5.65)	214.1 (8.43)	264.0 (10.39)	144.1 (5.67)	227.5 (8.96)	127.7 (5.03)	210.0 (8.27)	220.1 (8.67)	175.4 (6.91)	162.8 (6.41)	2,269.3 (89.36)
Source: NIWA

== See also ==
- List of mountains of New Zealand by height
- Fiordland

== Gallery ==
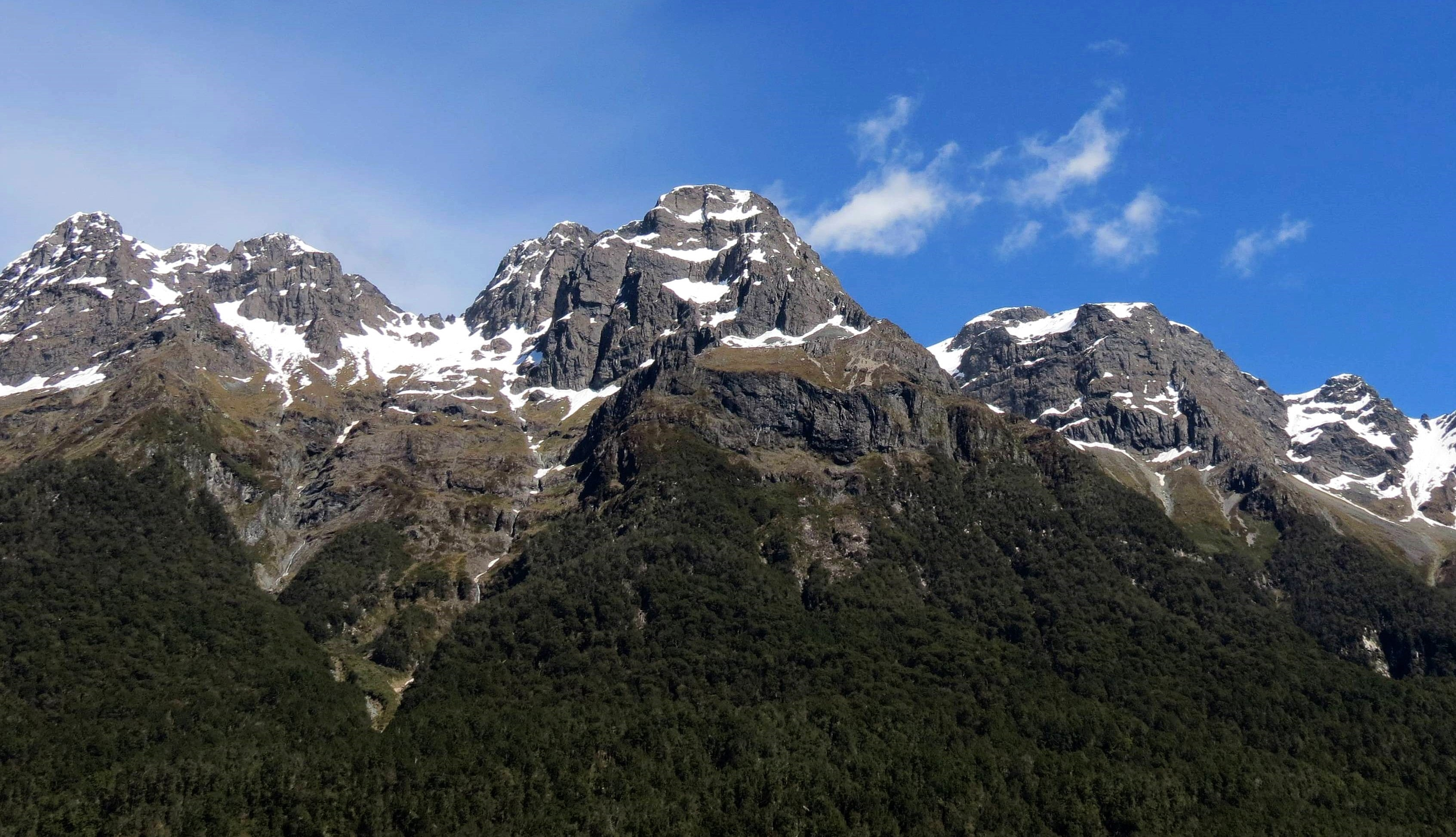
East aspect

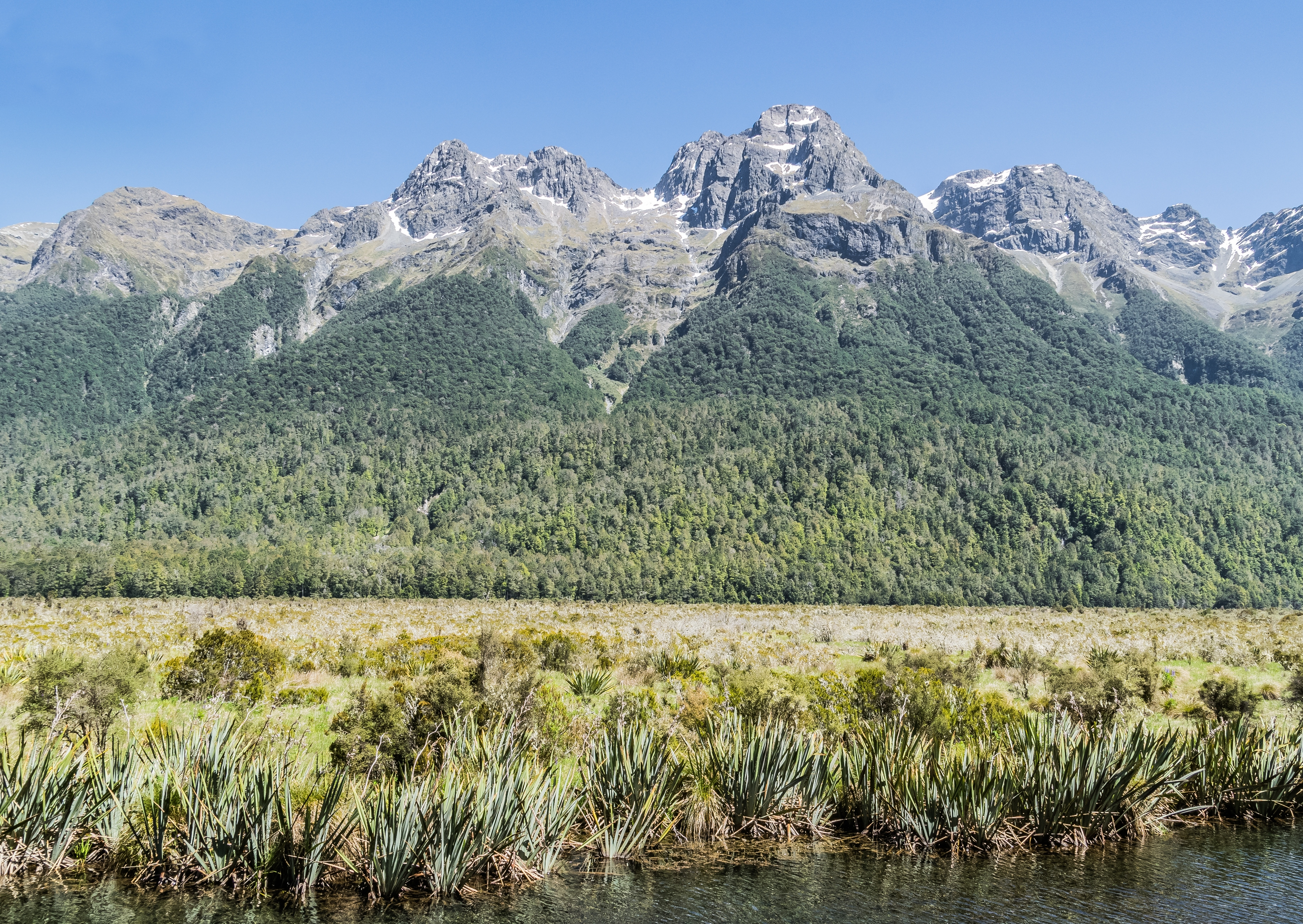
East aspect

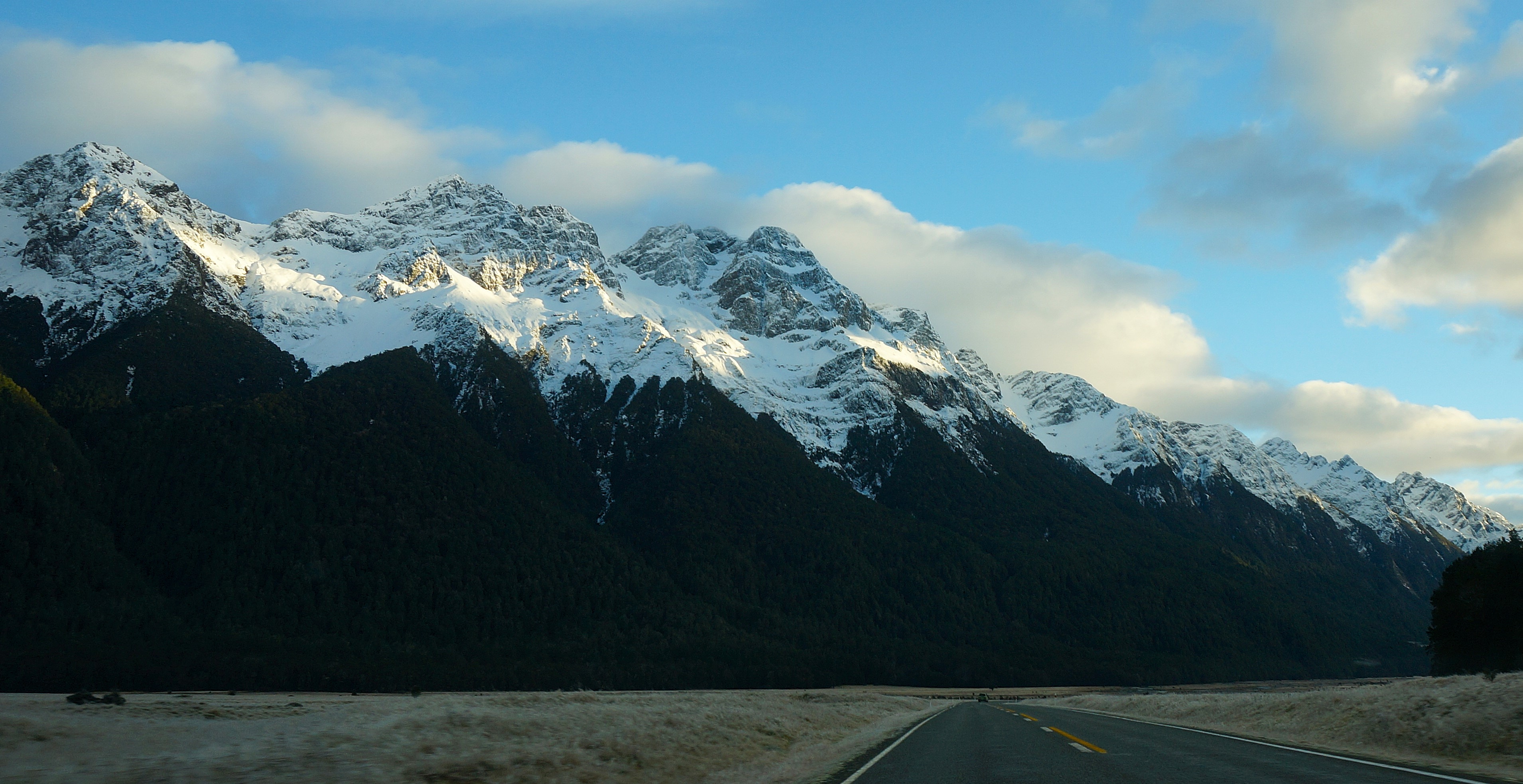
Southeast aspect, summit centred

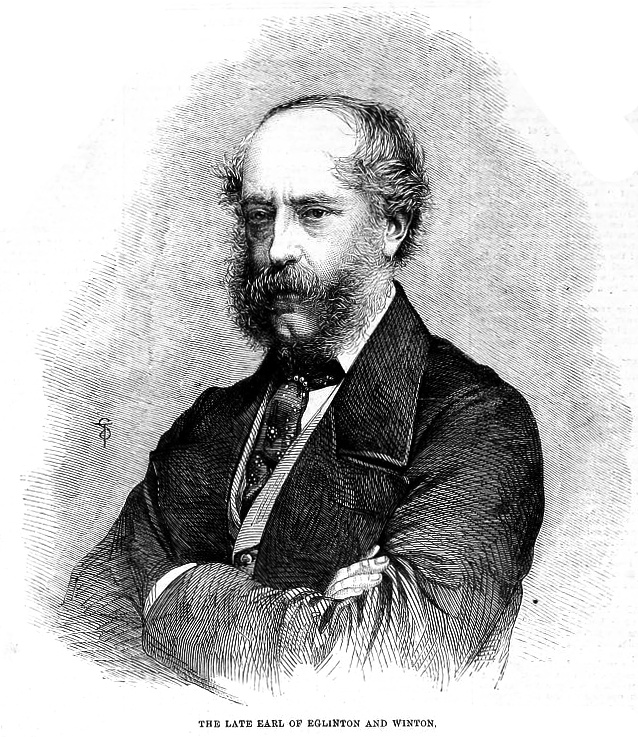
Archibald Montgomerie, 13th Earl of Eglinton

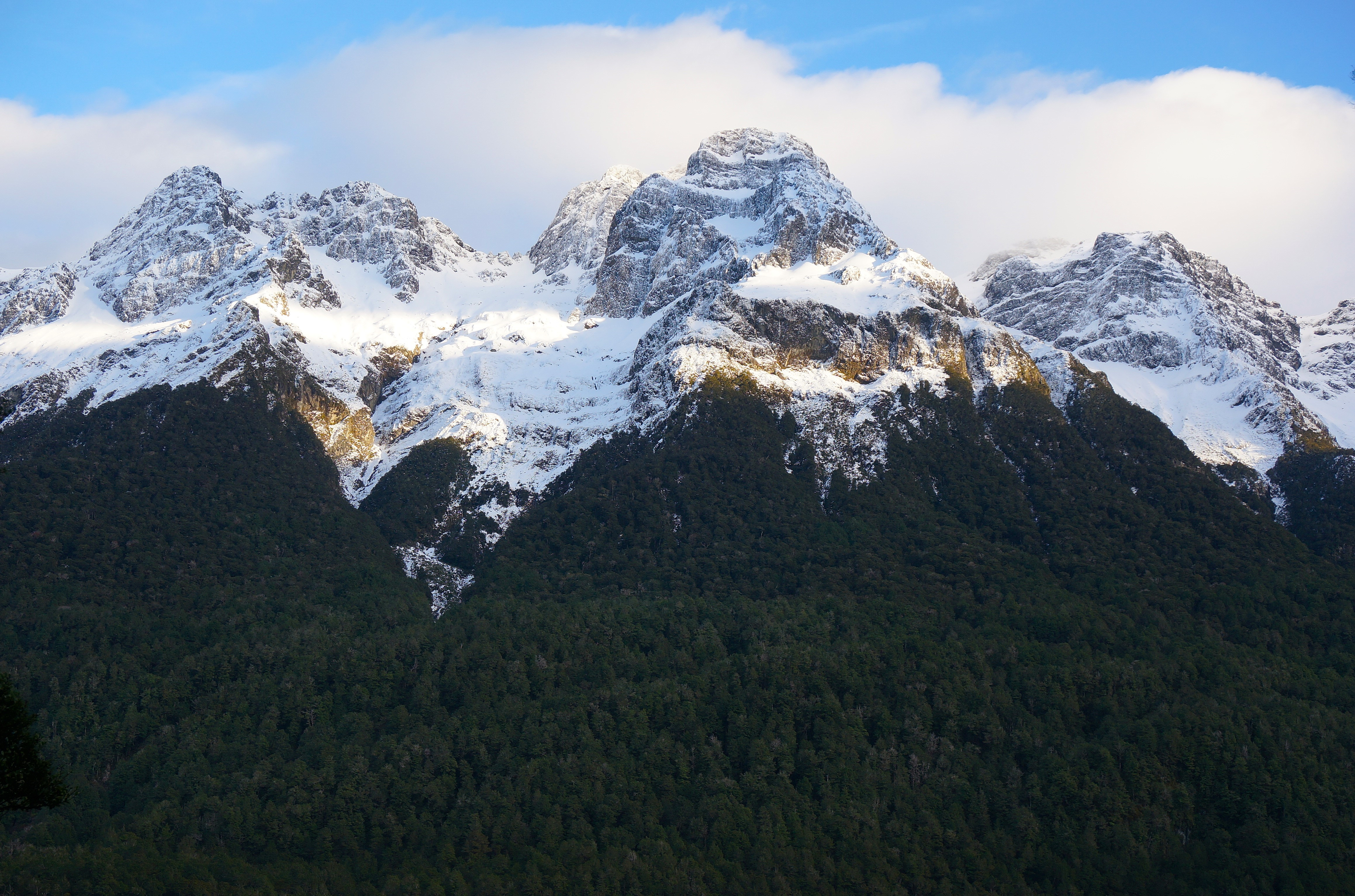
East aspect in winter

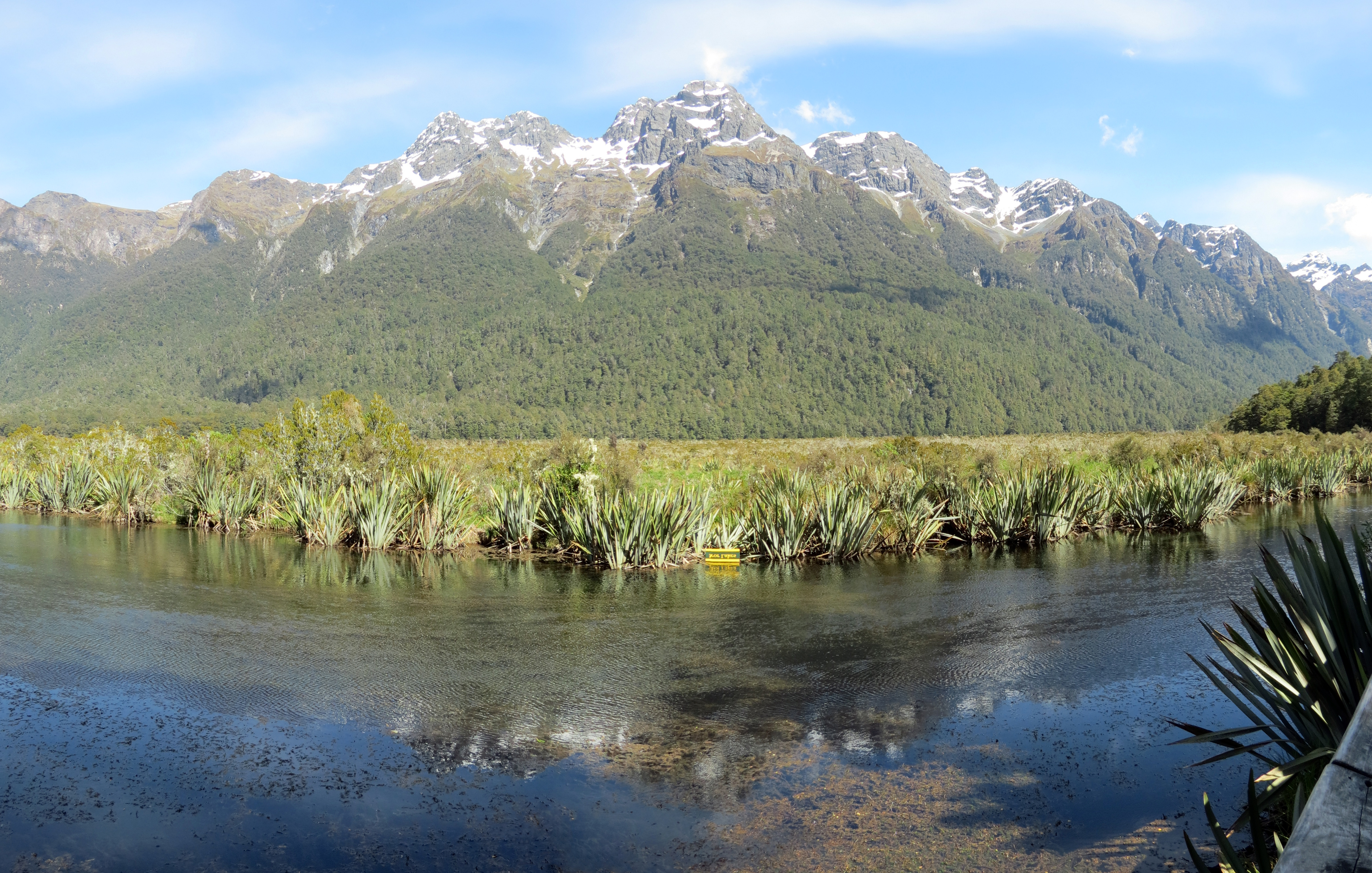

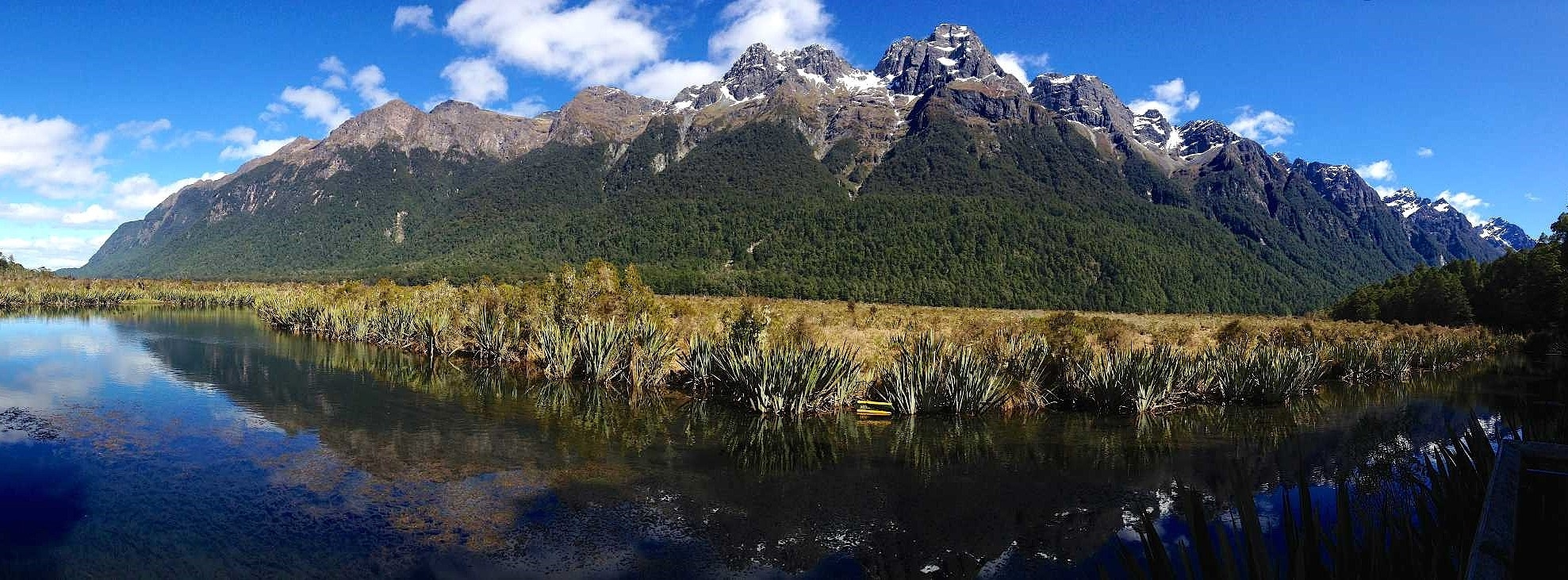
Mount Eglinton

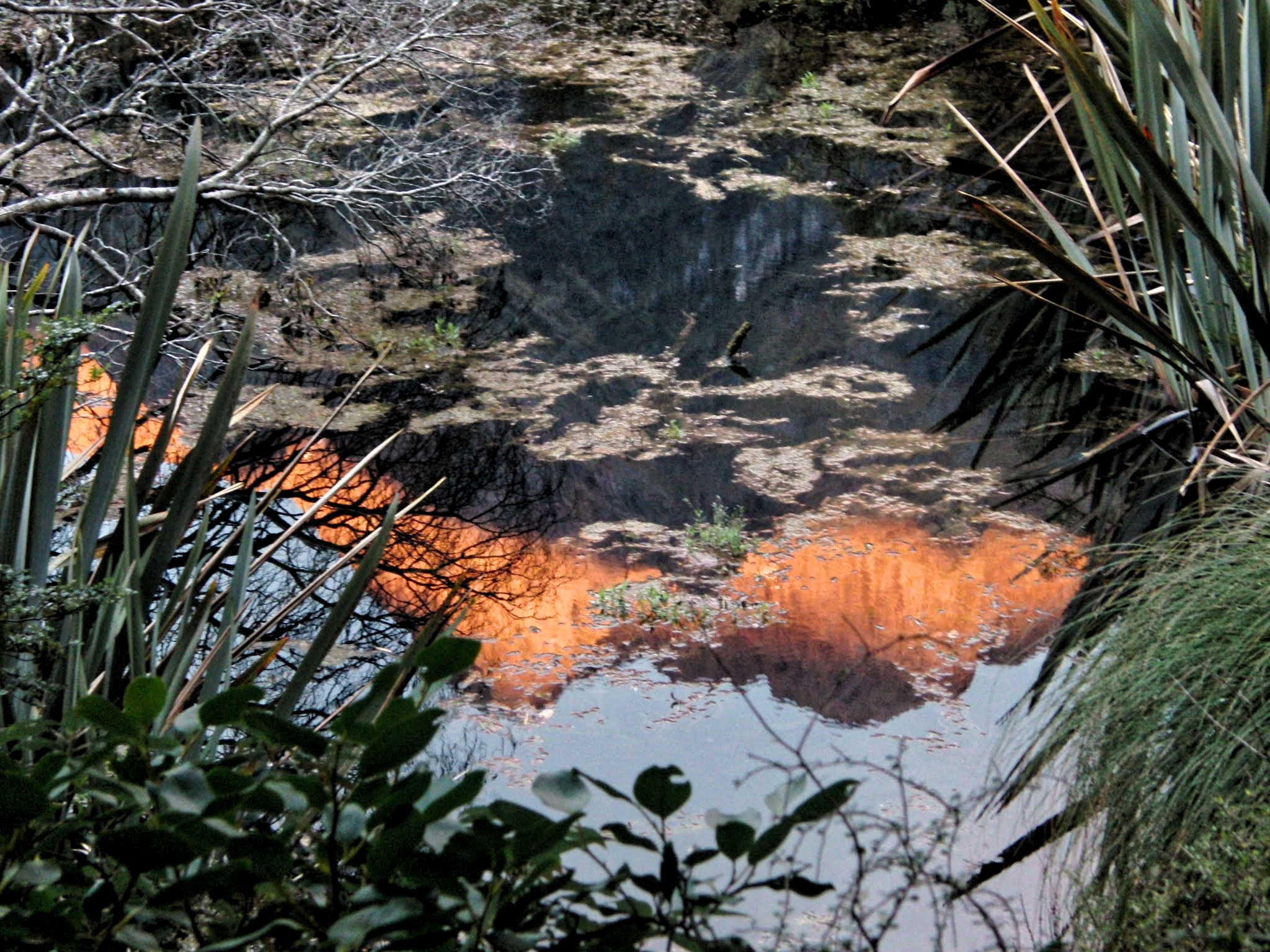
Water reflections on Mirror Lake
