= Nantcribba Castle =

Coordinates: 52.6051°N 3.1273°W

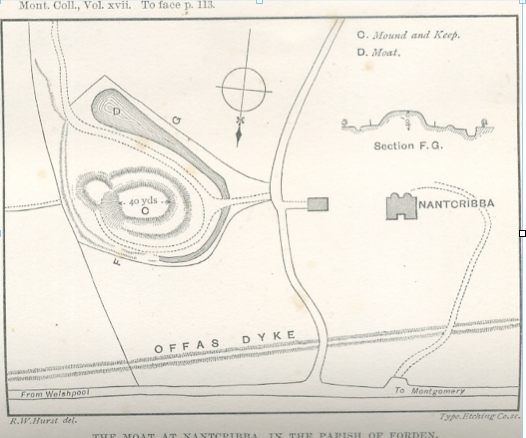
Location of Nantcribba Castle and Nantcribba Hall, 1884

Nantcribba Castle is a castle in Powys, Wales. It was built on a rocky outcrop. The site has been connected to a castle mentioned in medieval documents as "Gwyddgrug", which was first recorded in 1242. The castle was captured by Gruffudd ap Gwenwynwyn in 1263. The remains of the castle consist of a rocky mound of igneous rock surrounded by a ditch which encloses an area of 1.95 hectares (4.8 acres). The remains of Nantcribba castle are protected as a scheduled monument.

== See also ==
- Castles in Great Britain and Ireland
- List of castles in Wales
