= Beauport Park =

Building in East Sussex, England

Coordinates: 50°53′38″N 0°32′32″E

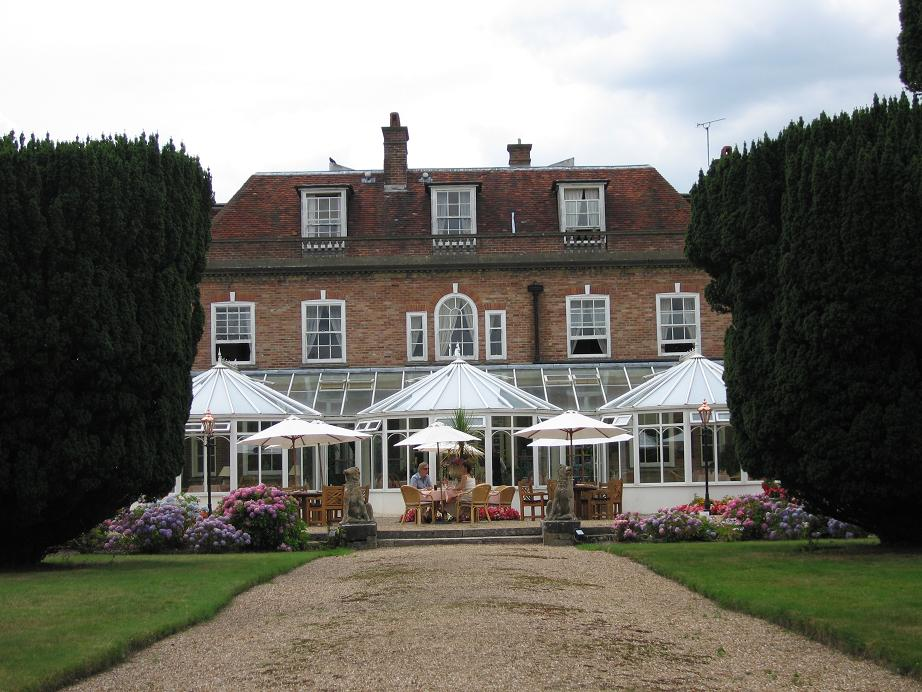

Beauport Park is a house near Hastings, East Sussex, England. It is located at the western end of the ridge of hills sheltering Hastings from the north and east.

== Roman occupation ==
In 1862, the Rector of Hollington Church found a huge slag heap on the site, evidence of probably the third largest iron works in the whole Roman Empire. In 1967, Gerald Brodribb, using divining rods, and Dr Henry Cleere, an expert on ancient iron-working, began work that uncovered an impressively preserved bath house that was saved during the development of the golf course. It was fully excavated in the early 1970s. Although it was scheduled as an Ancient Monument, at present it has no public access. Excavations in 1980 around the bath-house produced post-holes which seem to form part of a pre-Roman roundhouse.

== Early history ==
The first mention of Beauport Park is when General Sir James Murray is shown on local records as paying rates on some woodland. He built the house between 1763 and 1766, subsequently adding to the estate until it comprised about 5,000 acres (20 km^{2}). Murray, who had governed Canada from its conquest, named the estate after the Beauport quarter at Quebec. It was Murray who started the tradition of planting rare and unusual trees on the estate.

Following Murray's death in 1794, Beauport Park was then purchased by James Bland Burgess who served as Under Secretary of State for Foreign Affairs to William Pitt. An obelisk which stands opposite the front of the hotel is in memory of James Burgess' second son, Ensign Wentworth Noel Burgess, who was killed in 1812 in the Peninsular War, aged 18, whilst leading an assault on the citadel of Burgos in Northern Spain. In 1821, James and his eldest son Charles changed their name to Lamb in honour of John Lamb, a benefactor of theirs. An Ionic temple was built on the estate together with two life-size memorials which still remain.

By 1860, the estate was owned by Sir Charles Lamb's son, Archibald, who leased the house to Thomas Brassey, a leading railway engineer of his day. After Thomas Brassey died in 1870 the lease was inherited by his son who later became Lord Brassey.

== Recent history ==
In 1923 a fire broke out and despite efforts by firemen from Battle and Hastings taking water from nearby ponds, the fire spread rapidly and the entire building was gutted. The house was rebuilt in 1926.

Little is known about the house during the period that follows its reconstruction in 1926 up until World War II, but at the beginning of the war, it was an underground citadel. It consisted of tunnels and chambers, built by the Canadian Army and was intended as a hiding place for a secret resistance army which would have fought behind the German lines following the expected invasion of Britain. After the war, the house became a hotel.

In 1983 the hotel was bought by Ken Melsom, David Robinson and Helena Melsom and in 2005, Duncan Bannatyne opened a health club on the estate. Bannatyne went on to buy the hotel as well in 2007.

The Beauport Park Archaeological Trust was formed in 1996. In 1999 it was the subject of a Time Team dig. In 2007 the baths, set in five acres, were put on the market at £300,000 by Colin Henshaw of "Wild England". As of 2013 it is a Scheduled Monument at Risk and its condition was described by English Heritage as "Extensive significant problems" with "Deterioration - in need of management".

The estate currently comprises the hotel, the health club, a riding school, a caravan park, a 186-acre (0.75 km^{2}) golf course and 164 acres (0.66 km^{2}) of surrounding woodland.
