= Gerald Brodribb =

Cricket historian and archaeologist (1915–1999)

Arthur Gerald Norcott Brodribb (21 May 1915 – 7 October 1999) was a cricket historian and archaeologist.

== Life and career ==
Born in St Leonards-on-Sea, Brodribb was educated at Eastbourne College and read classics and English at University College, Oxford, where his tutor was C.S. Lewis. He became a schoolmaster, and from 1956 to 1968 he owned and ran Hydneye House, a prep school in East Sussex.

Brodribb was a descendant of the Victorian actor Sir Henry Irving and a founder member of the Cricket Society. His best-known work in cricket is Next Man In which "took cricket's Laws and re-examined them all with an eye to their quirks, oddities and exceptions". Among his other famous works are Hit for Six, a compendium of the big-hitters in cricket, and The Croucher, a biography of the early twentieth-century cricketer Gilbert Jessop.

Later in his career, he took an interest in archaeology and was awarded a doctorate in 1985 for his thesis on Roman building materials. His Roman Brick and Tile (1987) remains a key work on the subject. He took a particular interest in the Classis Britannica iron-working site at Beauport Park. Although he never published anything on the subject, he was also involved in researching the Roman roads in the area, especially the road leading north from Beauport Park. His use of dowsing to locate archaeological sites was not always well received in the archaeological community, a fact that was highlighted when archaeological television programme Time Team excavated at Beauport Park.

== Works ==
=== Cricket ===
- Champions of Cricket, etc. (1947)
- The English Game (anthology) (1948)
- Cricket in Fiction: A Bibliography (1950)
- All Round the Wicket: A Miscellany of Facts and Fancies of First-Class Cricket (1951)
- Next Man In: A Survey of Cricket Laws and Customs (1952)
- The Book of Cricket Verse (1953)
- A Yankee Looks at Cricket (1956)
- Hit for Six (1960)
- The Art of Nicholas Felix (1985)
- Cricket at Hastings (1989)
- The Lost Art: A History of Under-Arm Bowling (1997)

=== Biographies ===
- Felix on the Bat (1962)
- The Croucher (1974)
- Maurice Tate (1976)

=== Archaeology ===
- Roman Brick and Tile. Stroud: Alan Sutton. 1987. ISBN 0-86299-363-6. (Available on Google Books)
