= Bangors =

Coordinates: 50.76°N 04.55°W

- Location within Cornwall
- OS grid reference: SX2099
- Shire county: Cornwall
- Region: South West
- Country: England
- Sovereign state: United Kingdom
- Post town: Bude
- Postcode district: EX23
- Police: Devon and Cornwall
- Fire: Cornwall
- Ambulance: South Western

Bangors is a village in northeast Cornwall, England, United Kingdom. It is approximately four miles (6 km) south of Bude on the A39 trunk road, within the civil parish of Poundstock.
