= Archibald Montgomerie, 14th Earl of Eglinton =

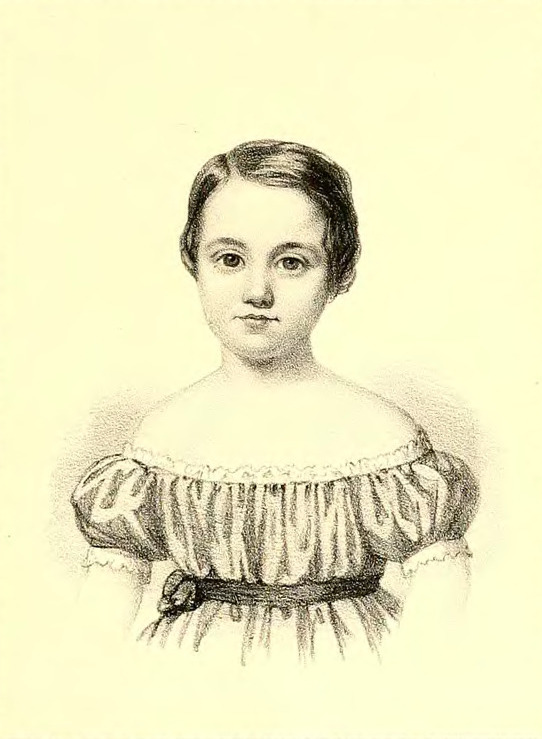

14th Earl of Eglinton
- In office 1861–1892

Personal details
- Born: 3 December 1841
- Died: 30 August 1892 (aged 50)
- Spouse: Sophia Anderson-Pelham
- Children: 4
- Parents: Archibald Montgomerie, 13th Earl of Eglinton; Theresa Newcomen

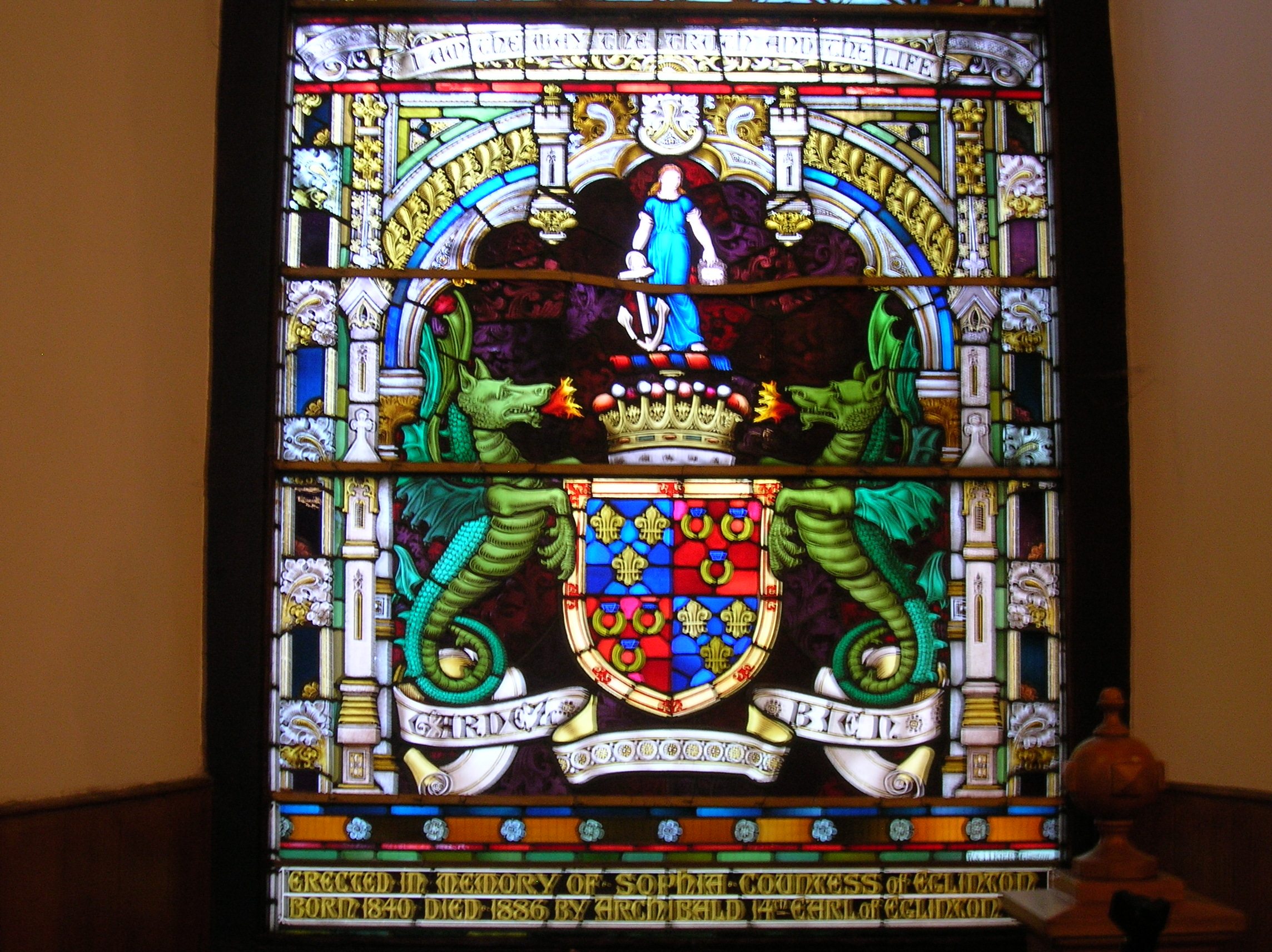
Memorial to Lady Sophia Montgomerie, wife of the 14th Earl

Archibald William Montgomerie, 14th Earl of Eglinton, DL (3 December 1841 – 30 August 1892) was a Scottish nobleman and member of the House of Lords.

Eglinton was a Deputy Lieutenant of Lanarkshire and Ayrshire. He succeeded to the titles on the death of his father on 4 October 1861.

== Family ==
Lord Eglinton married Lady Sophia Anderson-Pelham, daughter of the 2nd Earl of Yarborough. They had four daughters. Eglinton died on 30 August 1892, aged 50.

== Citations ==
Peerage of Scotland
Preceded by Archibald William Montgomerie	Earl of Eglinton; 1861–1892	Succeeded by George Arnulph Montgomerie
Peerage of the United Kingdom
Preceded by Archibald William Montgomerie	Earl of Winton; 1861–1892	Succeeded by George Arnulph Montgomerie
