= Philip Currie, 1st Baron Currie =

British diplomat

Philip Henry Wodehouse Currie, 1st Baron Currie, GCB, PC (13 October 1834 – 12 May 1906), known as Sir Philip Currie between 1885 and 1899, was a British diplomat. He was Permanent Under-Secretary of State for Foreign Affairs from 1888/9 to 1893, Ambassador to the Ottoman Empire from 1893 to 1898 and Ambassador to Italy from 1898 to 1902.

== Background and education ==
Currie was the son of Raikes Currie, Member of Parliament for Northampton, and the Hon. Laura Sophia, daughter of John Wodehouse, 1st Baron Wodehouse. He was a great-nephew of William Currie and a second cousin of Sir Frederick Currie, 1st Baronet and Vice-Admiral Mark John Currie. He was educated at Eton.

== Diplomatic career ==
Currie joined the Foreign Office in 1854. He was an attaché at St Petersburg, Russia, from 1856 to 1857, and précis writer to the Foreign Secretary, Lord Clarendon, from 1857 to 1858 and private secretary to another Foreign Secretary, Lord Salisbury, from 1878 to 1880. He was Assistant Permanent Under-Secretary of State for Foreign Affairs from 1882 to 1889, when he was made Permanent Under-Secretary of State for Foreign Affairs. He was Ambassador to the Ottoman Empire from 1893 to 1898 and as Ambassador to Italy from 1898 to 1902. Currie was appointed a CB in 1878, a KCB in 1885 and a GCB in 1892. In 1899 he was elevated to the peerage as Baron Currie, of Hawley in the County of Southampton.

From 24 November to 21 December 1898, Currie was one of the British Government delegates to the Rome Anti-Anarchist Congress, with Sir Howard Vincent and Sir Godfrey Lushington.

== Personal life ==
Currie married Mary, daughter of Charles James Savile Montgomerie Lamb and widow of Henry Sydenham Singleton, in 1894. She was a poet under the pen-name Violet Fane. There were no children from the marriage. She died in October 1905, aged 62. Lord Currie survived her by a year and died in May 1906, aged 71. The title became extinct on his death.

== Assessments ==
According to Keith Neilson and T. G. Otte, "Philip Currie was not a great permanent head of the Foreign Office... More than any other PUS, Currie was the creature of one of his political masters [Salisbury]."

Diplomatic posts
Preceded by Thomas Sanderson	Principal Private Secretary to the Secretary of State for Foreign Affairs; 1878–1880	Succeeded by Thomas Sanderson
Preceded by Sir Clare Ford	Ambassador Extraordinary and Plenipotentiary to His Imperial Majesty The Sultan; 1893–1898	Succeeded by Sir Nicholas O'Conor-Don
Preceded by Sir Clare Ford	Ambassador Extraordinary and Plenipotentiary to His Majesty the King of Italy; 1898–1903	Succeeded by Sir Francis Bertie
Peerage of the United Kingdom
New creation	Baron Currie; 1899–1906	Title extinct
