= Lamb baronets =

Set index for Lamb baronets

There have been two baronetcies held by people with the surname Lamb, both in the Baronetage of Great Britain. Both creations are extinct.

- Lamb baronets of Brocket Hall (1755): see Viscount Melbourne
- Burges, later Lamb baronets of Burghfield (1795)
