= Sir James Lamb, 1st Baronet =

British author and politician

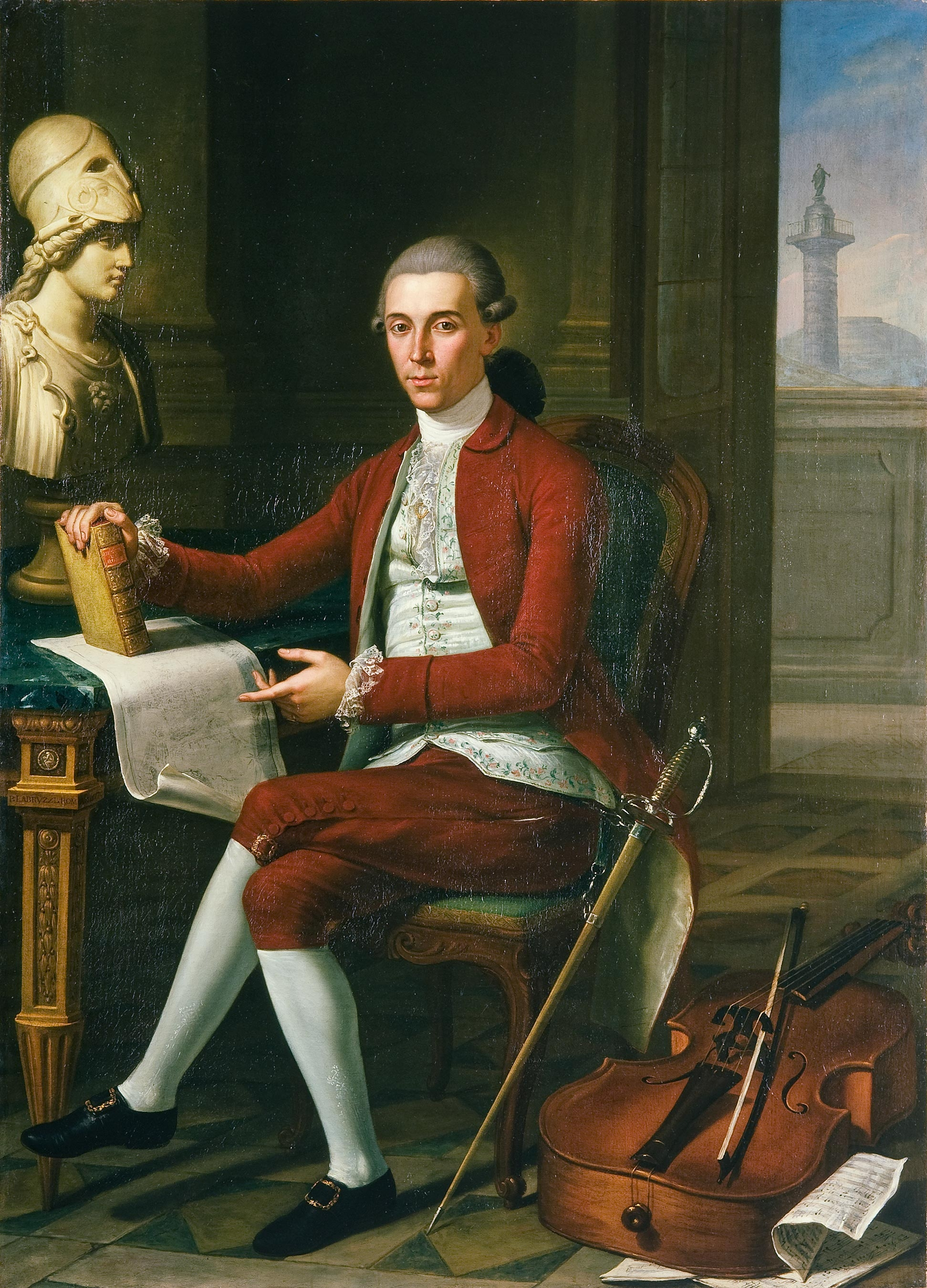
Portrait of Sir James Bland Burges (the future Sir James Lamb), painted in Rome in 1774 by Pietro Labruzzi during his Grand Tour

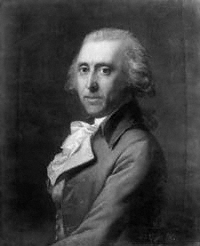
Sir James Burges

Sir James Bland Lamb, 1st Baronet (8 June 1752 – 13 October 1824), born James Burges and known as Sir James Burges, Bt, between 1795 and 1821, was a British author, barrister and Member of Parliament.

== Background and education ==
Born James Burges, he was the only son of George Burges and Anne Whichnour Somerville. His father had distinguished himself at the Battle of Culloden by capturing the standard of Charles Edward Stewart and was later deputy paymaster in Gibraltar.

He went to Westminster School and then entered University College, Oxford, in 1770 before studying law at Lincoln's Inn in 1773.

== Political career ==
Burges first served in Parliament as Member of Parliament for Helston from 1787 to 1790. He then served as Under-Secretary of State for Foreign Affairs between 1789 and 1795 before becoming a baronet on 21 October 1795 and knight marshal of his majesty's household in November of the same year, where he played an important role in the coronation of George IV.

== Writing and poetry ==
Burges was an ambitious and productive writer. He was well established; being a friend of William Cumberland and John Graves Simcoe; and a patron of Thomas Dermody. He was connected by marriage to Lord Byron. He wrote music for Ode to the Passions by William Collins and wrote the prologue to Vortigern and Rowena (1796).

He exchanged poetry with royalty and wrote long poems. The Birth and Triumph of Love was published in 1796 and the 16,000 line poem was very poorly received. It was quoted as a project that was known for its lack of success. Despite the ignominy Burges still had a prestige and funds available where he could indulge his literary interests. He wrote an introduction for William Henry Ireland's Shakespearian forgery and Thomas Dermody stole money from him. Burges continued to publish poetry and he had a play in Drury Lane. Despite being championed by Lord Byron, no other plays followed.

He wrote an introduction to a later edition of the Pilgrim's Progress sequel, Progress of the Pilgrim Good-Intent in Jacobinical Times. In this introduction he revealed that the true author of the work was his gifted sister Mary Ann Burges.

== Family ==
Burges married three times; his first marriage to Elizabeth Noel, second daughter of Edward Noel, 1st Viscount Wentworth in 1777 produced no children. His second marriage to Anne, third daughter of Lieutenant-Colonel Louis Charles Montolieu, Baron of St Hippolite produced the following children.

- Charles Montolieu (1785–1864), 2nd Baronet.
- Wentworth Noel (b. 30 December 1792), an ensign in the Coldstream Guards, he was killed at the 1812 Siege of Burgos during the Peninsular War.
- Somerville Waldemar (b. 7 March 1794), an ensign in the 1st Foot Guards, lost a leg at the Battle of Waterloo in 1815. In 1821 he married Mademoiselle Melanie-Marianne Meray, daughter of Capt. Meray, of the French Army.
- Clara Maria (d. 4 February 1821).
- Emilia Charlotte, who married Major-General Sir Hugh Halkett on 25 May 1810.
- Caroline Eliza Anne (d. 20 November 1863).
- Sophia Anne (d.11 October 1858), who married Warburton Davies on 21 December 1821.
- Julia Octavia (d. 28 October 1826).

In 1812, he was married for the third time to Lady Margaret Fordyce, widow of Alexander Fordyce and daughter of James Lindsay, 5th Earl of Balcarres. The couple had no children.

On 25 October 1821 his name was legally changed to James Bland Lamb by Royal Licence.

== Works ==
- Heroic epistle from Serjeant Bradshaw to John Dunning. 1780.
- Considerations on the law of insolvency. 1783.
- A letter to the Earl of Effingham. 1783.
- Address to the country gentlemen of England. 1789.
- Letters on the Spanish aggression at Nootka. 1790.
- Narrative of the negotiation between France and Spain in 1790. 1790.
- Alfred's letters: a review of the political state of Europe. 1792.
- The birth and triumph of love. 1796.
- Richard the first: a poem in eighteen books. 2 vols, 1801.
- The exodiad [with Richard Cumberland]. 1807, 1808.
- Riches, or the wife and brother: a play. 1810.
- Songs, duets, etc. in Tricks upon travellers, a comic opera. 1810.
- Dramas. 2 vols, 1817.
- The dragon knight: a poem in twelve cantos. 1818.
- Reasons in favour of a new translation of the holy scriptures. 1819.
- An inquiry into the procrastination attributed to the House of Lords. 1824.
- Selections from the letters and correspondence, ed. Hutton. 1885.

Parliament of Great Britain
| Preceded by Lord Hyde; Roger Wilbraham | Member of Parliament for Helston; 1787–1790; With: Roger Wilbraham | Succeeded by Sir Gilbert Elliot, Bt; Stephen Lushington |
Political offices
| Preceded by William Fraser; St Andrew St John | Under-Secretary of State for Foreign Affairs (with Hon. Dudley Ryder 1789); 1789–1795 | Succeeded by George Canning |
Court offices
| Preceded by Hugh Boscawen | Knight Marshal; 1795–1824 | Succeeded by Sir Charles Lamb, Bt |
Baronetage of Great Britain
| New creation | Baronet (of Burghfield); 1795–1824 | Succeeded by Charles Montolieu Lamb |
