= Archibald Kennedy =

Archibald Kennedy may refer to:

- Archibald Kennedy, 11th Earl of Cassilis (died 1794)
- Archibald Kennedy, 1st Marquess of Ailsa (1770–1846)
- Archibald Kennedy, Earl of Cassilis (1794–1832)
- Archibald Kennedy, 2nd Marquess of Ailsa (1816–1870)
- Archibald Kennedy, 3rd Marquess of Ailsa (1847–1938)
- Archibald Kennedy, 4th Marquess of Ailsa (1872–1943)
- Archibald Kennedy, 7th Marquess of Ailsa (1925–1994)
- Archibald Kennedy, 8th Marquess of Ailsa (1956–2015)

== See also ==
- Archibald M. Kennedy (1818–1897)
