= Clan Kennedy =

Lowland Scottish clan

- MacUalraig (Surname), Ceannaideach (Surname), Ceannaideach (Singular), Clann 'icUalraig (Collective)
- Crest: A dolphin naiant proper
- Motto: Avise la fin (Consider the end)

Profile
- District: Ayrshire
- Plant badge: oak

Chief
- David Kennedy
- 9th Marquess of Ailsa
- Seat: Cassillis House
- Historic seat: Dunure Castle; Culzean Castle
Septs of Clan Kennedy
Cassels, Cassillis, Cassell, MacOurlick, MacUlric, MacUlrick, Ulric
Clan branches
Kennedy of Cassillis (chiefs)
Kennedys of Kermuck
Kennedys of Moray
Kennedys of Bargany.
Allied clans
Clan Bruce
Rival clans
Clan Forbes

Clan Kennedy is a Scottish clan of the Scottish Lowlands.

== History ==
=== Origins of the clan ===
The Votadini were a tribe in Lothian and their chief, Cunedda, was sent by the British leader, Vortigern, to establish settlements in order to resist Picto-Scottish sea raids in the south west of Scotland. These settlements spread down the west coast as far as Wales. Cunedda is rendered as Cinneidgh in the Celtic language, meaning ugly or grim-headed. The name became associated with the district of Carrick, Scotland.

During the early part of the reign of William the Lion, Gilbert Mac Kenedi witnessed a charter to Melrose Abbey granting lands in Carrick. During the reign of Alexander II of Scotland Gillespie Kennedy is named in charters as the senechal of Carrick.

=== Wars of Scottish Independence ===
Kennedys supported Robert the Bruce during the Wars of Scottish Independence. Kennedys inherited the Earldom of Carrick from the line of Sir John Kennedy of Dunure's wife, Mary de Carrick, who descended from Sir Gilbert De Carrick. In 1372, Robert II of Scotland rewarded John Kennedy of Dunure as chief of his name and baillie of Carrick.

=== 15th and 16th centuries ===
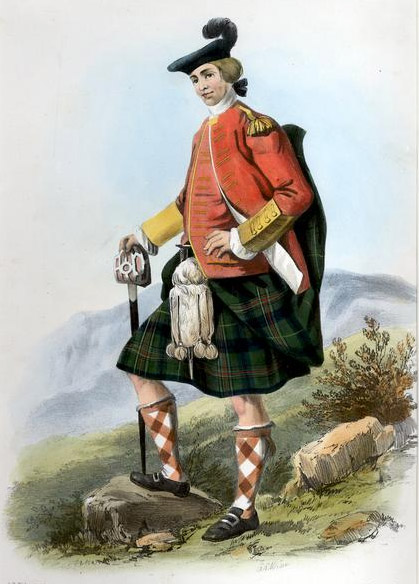
"Ulric". A Victorian era, romanticised depiction of a member of the clan by R. R. McIan, from The Clans of the Scottish Highlands, published in 1845. Carrick was in the Scottish Lowlands

In about 1457 John's direct descendant, Gilbert Kennedy, a son of Mary Stewart and grandson of Robert III of Scotland, was created Lord Kennedy. He was also a regent to the infant James III of Scotland. James Kennedy, his brother, was one of Scotland's best loved bishops. James served briefly as High Chancellor of Scotland and was also Bishop of Dunkeld, and also later Archbishop of St Andrews. In 1450 he founded St Salvator's College.

Hugh Kennedy of Ardstinchar was a Scots mercenary who fought at the Siege of Orléans for Joan of Arc. As a result, Joan figures on the arms of Kennedy of Bargany.

In 1509, David Kennedy, 3rd Lord Kennedy, was created Earl of Cassilis. He was killed at the Battle of Flodden in 1513. The second Earl of Cassillis was murdered in 1527. Gillbert Kennedy, the third Earl, was one of four Scottish commissioners who were poisoned on their return from the marriage of Mary, Queen of Scots to the Dauphin of France in 1558. The third Earl had inherited his title at the age of twelve and one of his first acts was to sign the death warrant of Patrick Hamilton, the first Scottish Protestant martyr.

The Moray Kennedys were a branch of the clan who travelled north with the sister of the third Lord Kennedy, Janet Kennedy who had a son by James IV of Scotland, as part of the possession of the earldom of Moray. The Moray Kennedys became a sept of the Clan Cameron.

=== 17th century and Civil War ===
In 1601 the Kennedy Earls of Cassillis were involved in a feud against their relations, the Kennedy Lairds of Bargany. The Earls of Cassillis were supported by the Clan Fergusson and the Laird of Bargany was killed.

From 1649 to 1651, John Kennedy, 6th Earl of Cassillis was Lord Justice General of Scotland and a zealous Protestant. He and his son, the seventh Earl, were both firm supporters of Parliament during the Civil War. The Justice General also sat in Oliver Cromwell's House of Lords. The Kennedys suffered for their beliefs but their estates remained largely intact.

The Kennedy of Kermuck branch of the clan were hereditary constables of Aberdeen from at least 1413. The Kennedys of Kermuck were outlawed when in 1652 the father and son of the family mortally wounded John Forbes of Watertown.

=== 18th and 19th centuries ===
When the Eighth Earl of Cassillis died there was a court dispute lasting three years to determine the succession. The titles and estates of the Kennedys were claimed by William Douglas, afterwards duke of Queensberry, a great grandson in the female line of the 7th earl and also by Sir Thomas Kennedy, Bart., of Culzean, a descendant of the 3rd earl, i.e. by the heir general and the heir male. In January 1762, the House of Lords found in favour of Thomas. On 30 November 1775, Thomas died unmarried, and was succeeded by his brother David, who commissioned Robert Adam to build Culzean Castle, and died unmarried on 18 December 1792.

With David, the baronetcy became extinct. The earldom of Cassillis now passed to a cousin, Archibald Kennedy, a captain in the royal navy, whose father, Archibald Kennedy (died 1763), had migrated to America in 1722 and had become collector of customs in New York. His son, the 11th earl, had estates in New Jersey and married an American heiress; in 1765 he was said to own more houses in New York than any one else. He died in London on 30 December 1794, and was succeeded by his son Archibald (1770–1846), who was created Baron Ailsa in 1806 and marquess of Ailsa in 1831. His great-grandson Archibald (born 1847) became 3rd marquess.

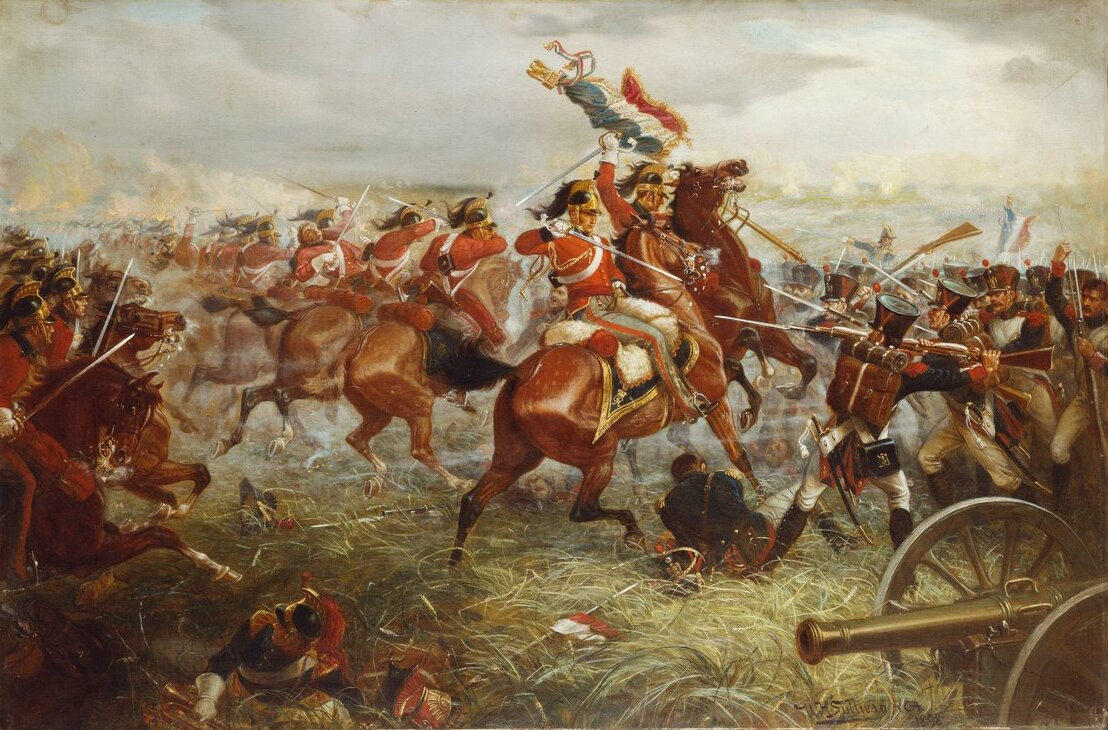
Alexander Kennedy Clark capturing a French Imperial Eagle at the Battle of Waterloo

Lieutenant General Sir Alexander Kennedy Clark served through the entire Peninsular War and in 1815 he commanded the centre squadron of the Royal Dragoons at the Battle of Waterloo. At Waterloo he personally captured the eagle and colours of the 105th Regiment of French Infantry. Clark was from the Kennedy of Moray branch of the clan.

=== 20th century ===
The lawyer, historian, author and campaigner for the righting of legal injustice, Ludovic Kennedy was a notable member of the Kennedy clan. In his collected writings, he recalls the story of his forebear, Captain Archibald Kennedy, returning from New York at the end of the 18th century to Culzean Castle to assume the earldom of Cassillis

== Castles ==
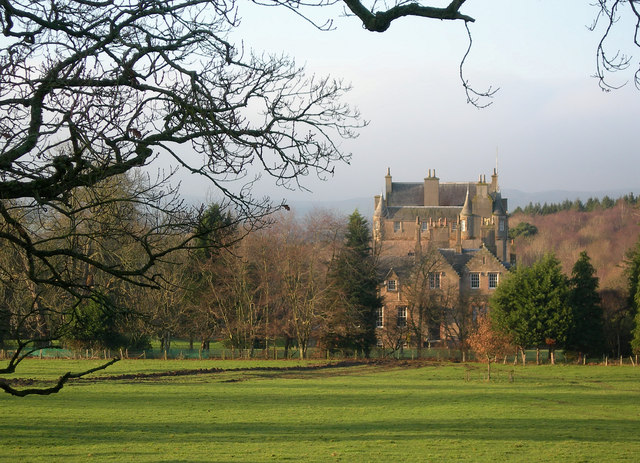
Cassillis House, Scottish Lowlands. Seat of the Chiefs of Clan Kennedy. Photo by Mary and Angus Hogg

- Cassillis House, near Maybole. Seat of the chiefs.
- Cessnock Castle in Ayr
- Culzean Castle was a former seat of the chiefs.
- Dunure Castle in South Ayrshire was the original stronghold of the chiefs.
- Dalquharran Castle in South Ayrshire once owned by the Kennedys of Kirkhill and Dunure; now a ruin
- Cruggleton Castle, Sorbie, Wigtownshire
- Dunduff Castle
- Greenan Castle in Ayr
- Maybole Castle
- Kinmuck Castle
- Old Ellon Castle

== Base of Scottish family tree ==
Here is the base of the family tree:

- John Kennedy of Dunure and Cassillis M Heiress of the Carrick Earls
  - Sir Gilbert
    - James M Princess Mary (2nd daughter of Robert III)
      - Gilbert (became Lord Kennedy in about 1457)
    - .x James Kennedy (He served as High Chancellor of Scotland and was Bishop of Dunkeld, and later Archbishop of St Andrews. At St Andrews he founded St. Salvator's College in 1450 and is one of the founders of the University of St Andrews)
        - Hugh Kennedy of Ardstinchar (part of the Great Army of Scotland during the Hundred Years' War and fought at the Battle of Baugé, and with Joan of Arc at the Siege of Orléans)
          - Sir David (Third lord of Kennedy, created Earl of Cassillis in 1509)

=== Scottish chief ===
- The Most Hon. David Thomas Kennedy, 9th Marquess of Ailsa, who is also Earl of Cassillis, Lord Kennedy, Baron Ailsa and Chief of the Name and Arms of Kennedy, of Ailsa.
- Arms: Scottish: Argent, a chevron Gules between three cross crosslets fichée Sable, all within a double tressure flory counterflory Gules.

Family tree of the Marquess of Ailsa, Earl of Eglinton, and Earl of Cassilis

Robert III c. 1337–1406; King of Scotland
Lord Montgomerie, 1448
Alexander Montgomerie d. 1470; 1st Lord Montgomerie	James Kennedy; Younger of Dunure	Mary Stewart
Lord Kennedy, 1457
Alexander Montgomerie; 1404–1452 styled Master of Montgomerie	Elizabeth	Gilbert Kennedy c. 1406 – c. 1480; 1st Lord Kennedy	James Kennedy c. 1408–1465; Archbishop of St Andrews
Alexander Montgomerie d. c. 1483; 2nd Lord Montgomerie	Catherine	Colin Campbell c. 1433–1493; 1st Earl of Argyll	John Kennedy; 1454–1508; 2nd Lord Kennedy
Earl of Eglinton, 1506	Earl of Cassillis, 1234
Hugh Montgomerie c. 1460–1545; 1st Earl of Eglinton, 3rd Lord Montgomerie	Helen	Archibald Campbell d. 1513; 2nd Earl of Argyll	David Kennedy; After 1463–1513; 1st Earl of Cassilis, 3rd Lord Kennedy
John Montgomerie d. 1520	Isabel	Gilbert Kennedy; 1494–1527; 2nd Earl of Cassilis, 4th Lord Kennedy
Hugh Montgomerie d. 1546; 2nd Earl of Eglinton, 4th Lord Montgomerie	Gilbert Kennedy; 1515–1558; 3rd Earl of Cassillis, 5th Lord Kennedy
Hugh Montgomerie c. 1531–1585; 3rd Earl of Eglinton, 5th Lord Montgomerie	Gilbert Kennedy c. 1541–1576; 4th Earl of Cassilis, 6th Lord Kennedy	Thomas Kennedy c. 1549–1602 styled Master of Cassillis
Hugh Montgomerie; 1563–1586; 4th Earl of Eglinton, 6th Lord Montgomerie	Margaret	Robert Seton; 1553–1603; 1st Earl of Winton	John Kennedy; 1575–1615; 5th Earl of Cassillis, 7th Lord Kennedy	Hew Kennedy styled Master of Cassillis	Alexander Kennedy d. 1652
Hugh Montgomerie d. 1612; 5th Earl of Eglinton, 7th Lord Montgomerie	Alexander Montgomerie; 1588–1661; 6th Earl of Eglinton, 8th Lord Montgomerie	John Kennedy d. 1668; 6th Earl of Cassillis, 8th Lord Kennedy	John Kennedy d. 1665	Alexander Kennedy d. 1698
Hugh Montgomerie; 1613–1669; 7th Earl of Eglinton, 9th Lord Montgomerie	James Montgomerie of Coylsfield d. 1675	John Kennedy; 1653–1701; 7th Earl of Cassillis, 9th Lord Kennedy
Kennedy Baronet of Culzean, in the County of Ayr, 1682
Alexander Montgomerie d. 1701; 8th Earl of Eglinton, 10th Lord Montgomerie	Hugh Montgomery	John Kennedy c. 1672–1700 styled Lord Kennedy	Archibald Kennedy d. 1710; 1st Kennedy Baronet of Culzean
Alexander Seton Montgomerie c. 1660–1729; 9th Earl of Eglinton, 11th Lord Montgomerie	Susanna Montgomerie; 1690–1780	Alexander Montgomerie d. 1783	John Kennedy; 1700–1759; 8th Earl of Cassillis, 10th Lord Kennedy	John Kennedy d. 1742; 2nd Kennedy Baronet of Culzean	Archibald Kennedy; 1685–1763
Alexander Montgomerie; 1723–1769; 10th Earl of Eglinton, 12th Lord Montgomerie	Archibald Montgomerie; 1726–1796; 11th Earl of Eglinton, 13th Lord Montgomerie	Hugh Montgomerie; 1739–1819; 12th Earl of Eglinton, 14th Lord Montgomerie, 1st Baron Ardrossan	John Kennedy d. 1744; 3rd Kennedy Baronet of Culzean	Thomas Kennedy d. 1775; 9th Earl of Cassillis, 11th Lord Kennedy, 4th Kennedy Baronet of Culzean	David Kennedy before 1734–1792; 10th Earl of Cassillis, 12th Lord Kennedy, 5th Kennedy Baronet of Culzean	Archibald Kennedy; 1720–1794; 11th Earl of Cassillis, 13th Lord Kennedy
Kennedy Baronet of Culzean extinct, 1792
Baron Ailsa, of Ailsa in the County of Ayr, 1806; Marquess of Ailsa, 1831
Mary Montgomerie d. 1848	Archibald Montgomerie; 1773–1814 styled Lord Montgomerie	Archibald Kennedy; 1770–1846; 1st Marquess of Ailsa, etc. 12th Earl of Cassillis, 14th Lord Kennedy
Archibald Kennedy IV; 1794–1832 styled Earl of Cassilis
Earl of Winton (2nd creation) and Baron Seton and Tranent, 1859
Archibald William Montgomerie; 1812–1861; 13th Earl of Eglinton, 1st Earl of Winton, etc., 15th Lord Montgomerie	Archibald Kennedy; 1816–1870; 2nd Marquess of Ailsa, etc. 13th Earl of Cassillis, 15th Lord Kennedy
Archibald William Montgomerie; 1841–1892; 14th Earl of Eglinton, 2nd Earl of Winton, etc., 16th Lord Montgomerie	George Arnulph Montgomerie; 1848–1919; 15th Earl of Eglinton, 3rd Earl of Winton, etc., 17th Lord Montgomerie	Archibald Kennedy; 1847–1838; 3rd Marquess of Ailsa, etc. 14th Earl of Cassillis, 16th Lord Kennedy
Archibald Seton Montgomerie; 1880–1945; 16th Earl of Eglinton, 4th Earl of Winton, etc., 18th Lord Montgomerie	Archibald Kennedy; 1872–1943; 4th Marquess of Ailsa, etc. 15th Earl of Cassillis, 17th Lord Kennedy	Charles Kennedy; 1875–1956; 5th Marquess of Ailsa, etc. 16th Earl of Cassillis, 18th Lord Kennedy	Angus Kennedy; 1882–1957; 6th Marquess of Ailsa, etc. 17th Earl of Cassillis, 19th Lord Kennedy
Archibald William Alexander Montgomerie; 1914–1966; 17th Earl of Eglinton, 5th Earl of Winton, etc., 19th Lord Montgomerie	Archibald David Kennedy; 1925–1997; 7th Marquess of Ailsa, etc. 18th Earl of Cassillis, 20th Lord Kennedy
Archibald George Montgomerie; 1939–2018; 18th Earl of Eglinton, 6th Earl of Winton, etc., 20th Lord Montgomerie
Hugh Archibald William Montgomerie b. 1966; 19th Earl of Eglinton, 7th Earl of Winton, etc., 21st Lord Montgomerie	Archibald Angus "Charles" Kennedy; 1956–2015; 8th Marquess of Ailsa, etc. 19th Earl of Cassillis, 21st Lord Kennedy	David Thomas Kennedy b. 1958; 9th Marquess of Ailsa, etc. 20th Earl of Cassillis, 22nd Lord Kennedy
Rhuridh Seton Archibald Montgomerie b. 2007 styled Lord Montgomerie	Archibald David Kennedy b. 1995 styled Earl of Cassillis
Heir apparent to the Earldom of Eglinton	Heir apparent to the Marquessate of Ailsa
