= Charles Kennedy, 8th Marquess of Ailsa =

Scottish peer (1956–2015)

- Coat of arms of the Marquess of Ailsa
- Born: Archibald Angus Charles Kennedy, Lord Kennedy; 13 September 1956; Ayrshire, Scotland
- Died: 15 January 2015 (aged 58); Altamonte Springs, Florida, US
- Spouse: Dawn Keen (m. 1979; div. 1989)
- Children: 2
- Father: Archibald Kennedy
- Relatives: David Kennedy (brother)

Archibald Angus Charles Kennedy, 8th Marquess of Ailsa, 19th Earl of Cassillis, 21st Lord Kennedy, 8th Baron Ailsa (13 September 1956 – 15 January 2015), known as Charles Ailsa, was a Scottish peer and hereditary chief of Clan Kennedy.

He was a member of the House of Lords from 1994 to 1999.

== Early life ==
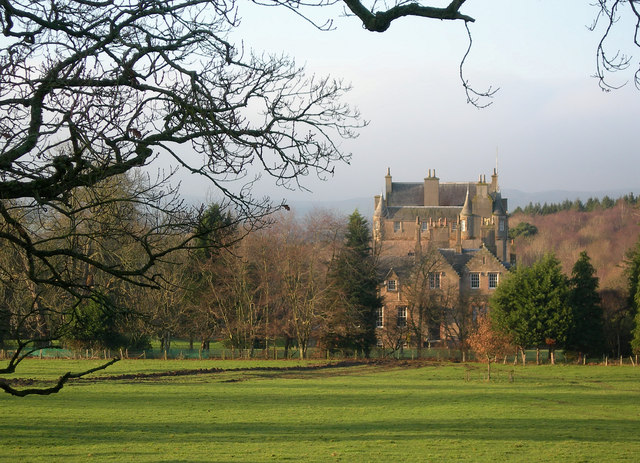
Cassillis House, Scottish Lowlands.

The future Lord Ailsa was born on 13 September 1956 in Culzean Castle, Ayrshire, the elder of the two sons of Archibald Kennedy, 7th Marquess of Ailsa, and his wife Mary Burn. He grew up in Cassillis House, another family seat, and was educated at Strathallan School, where he studied forestry and farming.

Ailsa's maternal grandfather was John Burn of Amble, Northumberland, and his paternal grandparents were Angus Kennedy, 6th Marquess of Ailsa and his wife Gertrude Millicent Cooper, daughter of Gervas Weir Cooper, of Wordwell Hall, Suffolk.

== Career ==
Kennedy gained a commission in the Queen's Own Highlanders. He later taught skiing and mountain craft to teams of army youth in the Scottish Highlands and the Brecon Beacons in Wales before retiring from the military in the Ayrshire Yeomanry.

After working in sales, marketing and agriculture, he founded Lord Charles Tours which organised trips to Scotland, Ireland, Sweden and Lapland.

On 7 April 1994, on his father’s death, he became 8th Marquess of Ailsa, 19th Earl of Cassillis, 21st Lord Kennedy, and 8th Baron Ailsa, and the hereditary Clan Chief of Clan Kennedy. The title is derived from the island of Ailsa Craig in the Firth of Clyde, which has been owned by the head of the family since the 16th century. He was also reported to have inherited a 10,000-acre estate, including Ailsa Craig. However, this was not the case. An alcoholic, he had inherited from his father only the peerages and the island, which his father had believed he would never sell. But in 2011, the 8th Marquess put Ailsa Craig up for sale, with an asking price of £2,500,000. As of March 2013, it was unsold and the price was "offers over £1,500,000". In the event, to save the island for the family, Lord David Kennedy, the future 9th Marquess, bought it.

On his death, Ailsa was succeeded by his younger brother, Lord David Kennedy, who had been managing the Ailsa estate since 1979.

== Personal life ==
In 1979, Lord Ailsa married Dawn Leslie Anne Keen, the only daughter of David A. Keen, of Rue Émeriau in Paris, France. Before their divorce in 1989, during which "his wife was accused of an affair with a teenage milk boy", they had two daughters, Lady Rosemary and Lady Alicia-Jane.

Ailsa died on 15 January 2015, while visiting a Kennedy clan function in Altamonte Springs, Florida.

== Ancestry ==
Ancestors of Charles Kennedy, 8th Marquess of Ailsa

16. Archibald Kennedy, 2nd Marquess of Ailsa
8. Archibald Kennedy, 3rd Marquess of Ailsa
17. Julia Jephson
4. Angus Kennedy, 6th Marquess of Ailsa
18. Charles Stuart, 12th Lord Blantyre
9. Hon. Evelyn Stuart
19. Lady Evelyn Leveson-Gower
2. Archibald Kennedy, 7th Marquess of Ailsa
10. Gervas Cooper
5. Gertrude Cooper
1. Archibald Kennedy, 8th Marquess of Ailsa
6. John Burn
3. Mary Burn

Peerage of the United Kingdom
Preceded by Archibald Kennedy	Marquess of Ailsa; 1994–2015	Succeeded by David Kennedy
