= Constance Barbara Clarke =

British nurse and yachtswoman (1866–1931)

Constance Barbara Clarke, Lady Baird
- Clarke in 1925
- Born: Constance Barbara Clarke; 1866; Chaffcombe, Somerset, England
- Died: November 1931 (aged 64–65); Wiarton, Ontario, Canada
- Occupations: Nurse and yachtswoman
- Spouse: Sir John Kennedy Erskine Baird KCB (m. 1905; died 1908) Charles Kennedy, 5th Marquess of Ailsa (m. 1925–1931)
- Parents: Edward Clarke (father); Barbara Clarke (mother)

Constance Barbara Clarke, Lady Baird (1866 – November 1931), later Lady Charles Kennedy, known as Constance, Lady Baird, was a British military nurse and pioneering yachtswoman.

== Early life and family ==
Constance Barbara Clarke was born at Avishays House, Chaffcombe, near Chard, Somerset in 1866, daughter of Edward Clarke, a solicitor and his wife Barbara. After studying in Paris, she trained as a nurse at St Bartholomew’s Hospital, London.

On 6 March 1905 she married the retired Rear Admiral Sir John Kennedy Erskine Baird. They lived at Wootton, Isle of Wight where both were active in sailing and the Cowes Regatta. Sir John was 30 years older than Constance, and died in 1908, leaving her a childless widow at the age of forty-two.

== Nursing career ==
Lady Baird & wounded at Chambery

Having trained as a nurse prior to her marriage, Lady Baird served as President of the Cowes Branch of the British Red Cross Society. When World War I broke out, she helped organise a hospital for wounded soldiers at Northwood House. She joined active service in France and Belgium, first as a trooper, then serjeant, in the First Aid Nursing Yeomanry (FANY).

== Yachtswoman ==
After the war, Constance moved to Fremington, near Barnstaple, Devon, where she had inherited Fremington Manor from an aunt.

She retained her passion for sailing and acquired one of the first 6-metre yachts, ‘’Thistle’’, built by William Fife & Sons, in 1923, competing in regattas and races. In 1925 she won the King of Spain’s Cup, for which she was the only woman competitor. She championed the founding of an international competition for 6-metre yachts, the British-American Cup, which ran from 1921 to 1955, and in 1924, donated the Lady Baird Trophy for 6 metre yacht races.

== Later life ==
In 1925, she married Sir Charles Kennedy, a distant cousin of her first husband, who later (after Constance’s death) became the 5th Marquess of Ailsa.

Constance was taken ill and died while visiting a cousin, the Canadian politician Alexander McNeill, in Wiarton, Ontario, in November 1931.

== Honours and awards ==
- Medaille de la Reine Elisabeth (Belgium) 1919
- Croix de la Couronne (Belgium) 1919
