= Gilbert Kennedy, 3rd Earl of Cassilis =

Scottish landowner

Gilbert Kennedy
- 3rd Earl of Cassillis, 5th Lord Kennedy
- Predecessor: Gilbert Kennedy, 2nd Earl of Cassilis
- Successor: Gilbert Kennedy, 4th Earl of Cassilis
- Born: 12 May 1515
- Died: 15 November 1558 (aged 43)
- Noble family: Kennedy
- Spouse: Margaret Kennedy (m. 1540)
- Issue: Katherine Kennedy; Gilbert Kennedy, 4th Earl of Cassilis; Sir Thomas Kennedy, Master of Cassillis; Jean Stewart, Countess of Orkney; Lady Isobel Kennedy
- Father: Gilbert Kennedy, 2nd Earl of Cassilis
- Mother: Lady Isabel Campbell

Gilbert Kennedy, 3rd Earl of Cassillis (/ˈkæsəlz/ KASS-əlz; 12 May 1515 – 15 November 1558) was a Scottish landowner, soldier, politician, and judge. He served as Treasurer of Scotland.

== Biography ==
He was the son of Gilbert Kennedy, 2nd Earl of Cassillis, and succeeded to the titles of 5th Lord Kennedy and 3rd Earl of Cassillis in August 1527. On 6 February 1540/41 he had a charter of the Fief of Cassillis. As a young man, Kennedy studied at the University of St. Andrews and in Paris under the Scottish humanist George Buchanan for five years.

In November 1542, Kennedy, in his late twenties at the time, was taken prisoner at the Battle of Solway Moss, and after a short stint in the Tower of London, was placed under the care of Thomas Cranmer, Archbishop of Canterbury. Scottish historian Gilbert Burnet (1643–1715) believed that it was this relationship with Cranmer that led Kennedy toward Protestantism, as certainly he was one of the first of the Scottish nobility to adopt Reformed views. However, since his time with Cranmer lasted only one month, it is likely that his earlier contact with Buchanan had been a stronger influence in this regard.

Sir Thomas Wharton, Warden of the English West March, wrote to the Privy Council of Henry VIII, on 10 December 1542, regarding ransoms for prisoners taken at the battle, including the Earl of Cassillis, who was taken by Batill Routlege. Credit was also given to John Musgrave who "claimeth a part for the loan of his horse to the said Routlege".

Cassillis held the office of Treasurer of Scotland in 1554, of Extraordinary Lord of Session between 1546 and 1558.

During the war with England known as the Rough Wooing, Cassillis fought in the Battle of Pinkie Cleugh on 10 September 1547. Two years later, during the siege of Haddington he organised the demolition of East Linton Bridge to hinder English troops.

Cassillis borrowed money from Timothy Cagnioli, an Italian financier, for his expenses as a diplomat in France in 1558. The sum of £6,720 Scots was not repaid in 1586, and Cagnioli claimed it from his grandson, John Kennedy, 5th Earl of Cassillis.

In 1558 he was present, as one of the eight Commissioners appointed by the Scottish Parliament, at the marriage of Mary, Queen of Scots, to the Dauphin of France, to whom the Scottish deputies unanimously refused the Crown matrimonial. The Court of France appeared deeply mortified by this disappointment, and the Earl of Cassillis, with two others of the Commissioners, dying in one night, on 28 November 1558, at Dieppe, a report was raised that they had been poisoned, which was further countenanced by the death of a fourth Commissioner, Lord Fleming, at Paris, on 16 December 1558. However, according to the Dictionary of National Biography, this report was untrue, as the actual dates of death of these persons were not the same, with Cassillis dying in November.

Henry II of France had appointed Gilbert as Gentleman in Ordinary of his Chamber on 4 May 1558, and this honour was transferred to his heir, Gilbert, 4th Earl of Cassillis on 10 February 1559.

== Family ==
In 1540 the Earl married Margaret Kennedy (d. 1580), a widow of Hugh Wallace of Craigie, and they had five children.

- Lady Katherine Kennedy, who married Sir Patrick Vans of Barnbarroch
- Gilbert Kennedy, 4th Earl of Cassillis (c. 1541–1576)
- Sir Thomas Kennedy of Culzean, Tutor of Cassillis (b. c. 1549, d. 1602). He joined the court of James VI as a gentleman of the bedchamber in October 1580.
- Lady Jean Kennedy (bef. 1558 – c.1598); married Robert Stewart, 1st Earl of Orkney.
- Lady Isobel Kennedy (24 July 1542 – 12 January 1598); married Sir Patrick Mc Elwain of Thomaston Castle and had descendants.

Peerage of Scotland
| Preceded by Gilbert Kennedy | Earl of Cassilis; 1527–1558 | Succeeded by Gilbert Kennedy |
