= Laurence Merriam =

England international rugby union player & British Army officer

Sir Laurence Merriam MC
- Full name: Laurence Pierce Brooke Merriam
- Born: 28 January 1894 Islington, London, England
- Died: 27 July 1966 (aged 72) London, England
- School: St Paul's School, London
- University: University College, Oxford
- Occupation: Plastics manufacturer

Rugby union career
- Position: Forward
International career
Years	Team	Apps	(Points)
1920	England	2	(0)

Sir Laurence Pierce Brooke Merriam (28 January 1894 – 27 July 1966) was a British Army officer, plastics manufacturer and international rugby union player of the 1920s.

Born in Islington, Merriam was educated at St Paul's School, London, and University College, Oxford, where he gained blues for rugby in the 1913 Varsity Match. He was also a varsity swimmer and water polo player.

Merriam enlisted at the outbreak of World War I in 1914 and was commissioned into the Rifle Brigade. In 1916, Merriam was awarded the Military Cross for his actions during the Battle of Flers. He became an Acting Major while attached to the 7th Battalion, Tank Corps, and was wounded twice over the course of the war.

Returning to rugby after the war, Merriam gained two England caps in the 1920 Five Nations, as a second row forward against Wales at Swansea and France at Twickenham, then in 1922 ascended to the captaincy of his club Blackheath.

Merriam, who was knighted in 1949, was involved in the family business of plastics manufacturing, serving as Chairman of British Xylonite and BX Plastics. He also chaired the Furniture Development Council and was deputy lieutenant for Essex County Council. His wife, Marjory, was the daughter of Scottish peer Archibald Kennedy, 3rd Marquess of Ailsa.

== See also ==
- List of England national rugby union players
