= Charles Kennedy, 5th Marquess of Ailsa =

Marquess of the United Kingdom (1875–1956)

The Most Honourable Charles Kennedy
- Marquess of Ailsa
- Tenure: 1943–56
- Born: 10 April 1875; Culzean Castle, Ayrshire, Scotland
- Died: 1 June 1956 (aged 81); Culzean Castle, Ayrshire, Scotland
- Locality: Ailsa Craig
- Spouse: Constance Barbara Clarke
- Issue: None
- Parents: Archibald Kennedy, 3rd Marquess of Ailsa

Arms of the Marquess of Ailsa

Charles Kennedy, 5th Marquess of Ailsa (10 April 1875 – 1 June 1956) was a Scottish peer, the son of Archibald Kennedy, 3rd Marquess of Ailsa. He was known as Lord Charles Kennedy until 1943, when he inherited the marquessate.

== Biography ==
Lord Charles was born at Culzean Castle in Ayrshire. He was educated at Eton and the Royal Agricultural College, Cirencester before taking up a military career. On 27 January 1894, he was commissioned a second lieutenant in the 3rd Battalion, Royal Scots Fusiliers, but resigned his commission on 5 May. During the Second Boer War, he fought as a captain in an Australian regiment, the Prince of Wales' Light Horse, and received the Queen's South Africa Medal with three clasps.

After the Boer War, Kennedy moved to the United States, living in Wyoming through about 1910, and then in Nevada, Missouri and Davenport, Iowa. In November 1914, on the outbreak of World War I, he returned to Great Britain and joined the Ayrshire Yeomanry in January 1915. He was passed as "unfit for overseas service" and was appointed an area gas officer in late 1916. Kennedy was briefly posted to France as a gas instructor with the 18th (Eastern) Division in 1918. He resigned his captaincy in the Yeomanry on 14 January 1921.

On 15 December 1925, he married Constance Barbara Clarke, widow of Sir John Baird. She died in 1931. Kennedy made a second marriage to Helen Ethel McDouall, widow of Richard John Cuninghame, of Hensol House, on 26 April 1933.

Kennedy succeeded his elder brother as Marquess of Ailsa in 1943. In 1945 he presented the family seat, Culzean Castle, to the National Trust for Scotland under the Country House Scheme. He died without issue in 1956 and his titles passed to his younger brother.

Peerage of the United Kingdom
Preceded by Archibald Kennedy	Marquess of Ailsa; 1943–1956	Succeeded by Angus Kennedy
