= Church of St Michael and All Angels, Chaffcombe =

Church in Somerset, England

Church of St Michael and All Angels
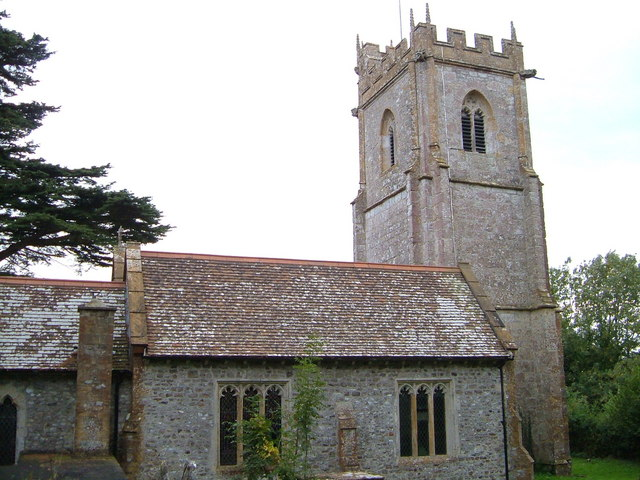

- Location within Somerset
- 50.8875°N 2.9198°W
- Location: Chaffcombe, Somerset, England

History
- Built: 15th century

Site notes
- Architect: James Mountford Allen

Listed Building – Grade II*
- Official name: Church of St Michael and All Angels
- Designated: 4 February 1958
- Reference no.: 1056177

The Anglican Church of St Michael and All Angels in Chaffcombe, Somerset, England was built in the 15th century. It is a Grade II* listed building.

== History ==
The first church in Chaffcombe is recorded in 1187.

The church was built in the 15th century and tower is still from that period, but the rest of the church was rebuilt between 1857 and 1860 by James Mountford Allen.

The parish is part of the Two Shires benefice within the Diocese of Bath and Wells.

== Architecture ==
The stone building has hamstone dressings and clay tile roofs. It has a three-bay nave, two-bay chancel. The three-stage tower is supported by offset buttresses. The tower contains a peal of six bells. The outside has several gargoyles.

Inside the church are a copy of the Madonna and child by Raphael and an early font which pre-dates the current building. The font is undecorated and stands on a cylindrical stem.

== See also ==
- List of ecclesiastical parishes in the Diocese of Bath and Wells
