= Kinmuck Castle =

14th-century castle in Aberdeenshire, Scotland

- Near Ellon, Aberdeenshire, Scotland

Site information
- Type: Castle

Location
- Coordinates: 57.40560747°N 2.01830904°W

Site history
- Built: 14th century

Kinmuck Castle was a 14th-century castle, about 4.0 miles (6.4 km) north-east of Ellon, Aberdeenshire, Scotland, at, or close to, Mains of Kinmuck. Alternative names are Castle of Kinmuck, Carmuck Castle and Kermuck Castle. Castle of Kinmuck is the locally accepted spelling.

== History ==
In 1413 the castle belonged to Thomas Kennedy, Constable of Aberdeen, who dismantled it to build the old Ellon Castle.

Clan member crest badge - Clan Kennedy

== Structure ==
Only vague traces of a circular ditch enclosing an area 40 metres (130 ft) wide remain. The ditch was filled in 1867.

== See also ==
- Castles in Great Britain and Ireland
- List of castles in Scotland
