= Archibald Kennedy, 7th Marquess of Ailsa =

Scottish peer

Archibald Kennedy, 7th Marquess of Ailsa OBE DL
- Born: Archibald David Kennedy; 3 December 1925; Colchester, Essex
- Died: 7 April 1994 (aged 68)
- Spouse: Mary Burn (m. 1954)
- Children: 3, including Archibald and David
- Father: Lord Angus Kennedy

Archibald David Kennedy, 7th Marquess of Ailsa, OBE, DL (3 December 1925 – 7 April 1994), styled Earl of Cassillis from 1 June 1956 to 31 May 1957, was a Scottish peer and chief of Clan Kennedy.

== Early life ==
Kennedy was born at Brick Kiln Farm, Colchester, Essex, the only son of Lord Angus Kennedy (the third son of the 3rd Marquess of Ailsa), and Gertrude Millicent Cooper. He was educated at the Nautical College, Pangbourne, which trained boys to become merchant navy officers.

In early life, as David Kennedy, he was commisdioned as a lieutenant into the Scots Guards and also worked as a steam locomotive fireman.

He later served as a lieutenant-colonel in the Royal Scots Fusiliers, a part-time territorial regiment.

In 1956, his father, Lord Angus, succeeded his childless elder brothers as the 6th Marquess of Ailsa, at which point Archibald became known by the courtesy title Earl of Cassillis. His father died exactly 365 days later on 1 June 1957, and Archibald succeeded as the 7th Marquess.

He took charge of the Isle of Man Railway as its lessee for the 1967–1971 seasons.

== Personal life ==
He married Mary (3 May 1916 – 17 August 2007, Edinburgh), daughter of coal miner John Burn, of Amble, Northumberland, on 7 April 1954 and they had three children:

- Lady Elizabeth Helen Kennedy (born 23 February 1955), married in 1976 Rev. Norman Walker Drummond CBE FRSE, chaplain to Queen Elizabeth II in Scotland
- Archibald Angus Charles Kennedy, 8th Marquess of Ailsa (13 September 1956 – 15 January 2015), died unmarried
- David Thomas Kennedy, 9th Marquess of Ailsa (born 3 July 1958)

Peerage of the United Kingdom
| Preceded by Angus Kennedy | Marquess of Ailsa; 1957–1994 | Succeeded by Archibald Kennedy |
