= Alloway Mote =

Medieval castle in South Ayrshire, Scotland

- Alloway, South Ayrshire, Scotland
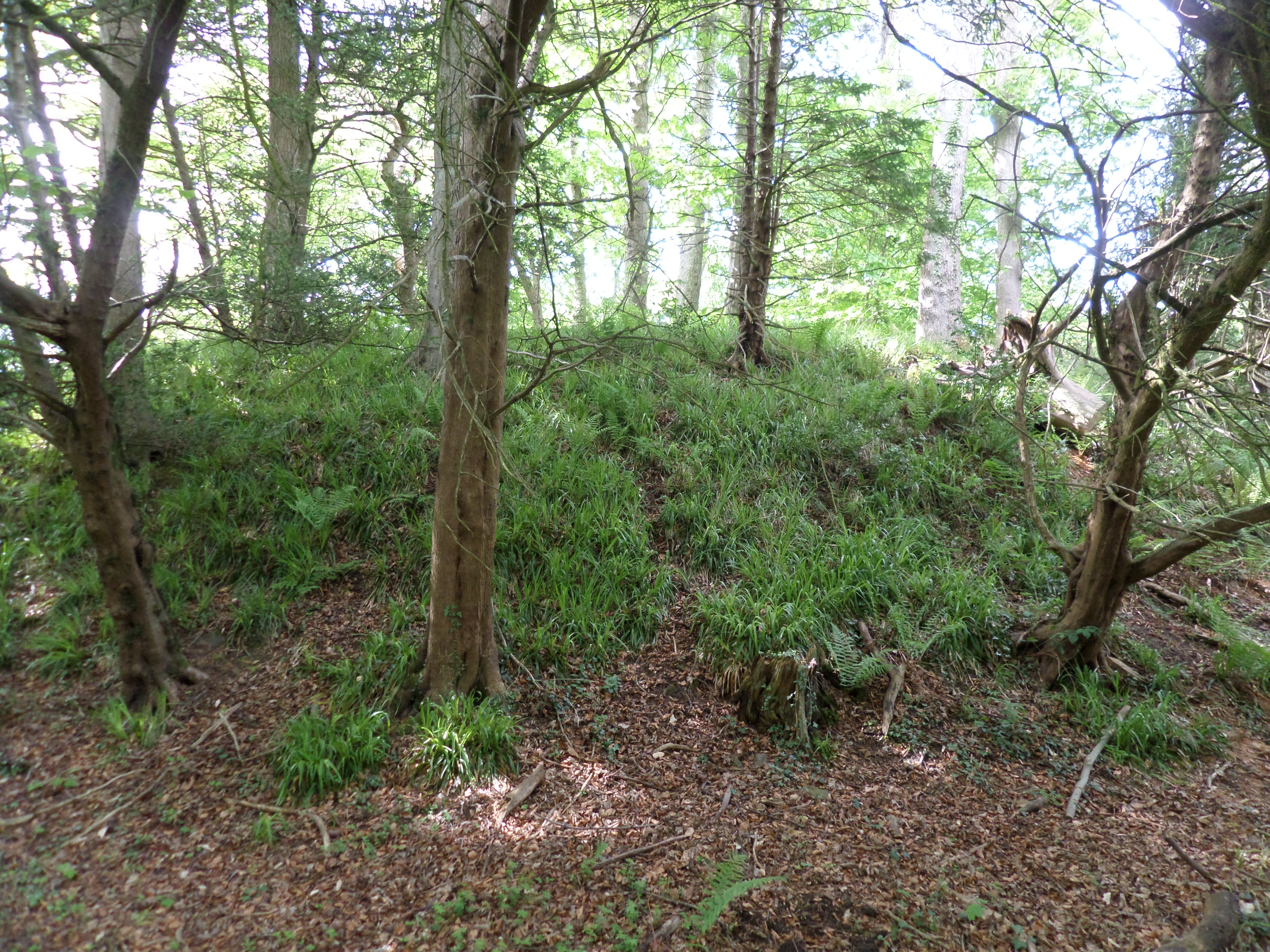
- Alloway Mote

Site information
- Type: Earthwork
- Owner: Private land
- Open to the public: No
- Condition: Eroded by the River Doon

Location
- Coordinates: 55.428089°N 4.627195°W
- Grid reference: grid reference NS338179
- Height: 5 m (16 ft)

Site history
- Built: 12th Century
- Materials: Earth banks

The Scheduled Ancient Monument of Alloway Mote, also known as the Alloway Moat or Alloway Motte, is a roughly circular earthwork that is regarded as a possible early medieval ringwork, located near the village of Alloway in South Ayrshire, Scotland.

== Location ==
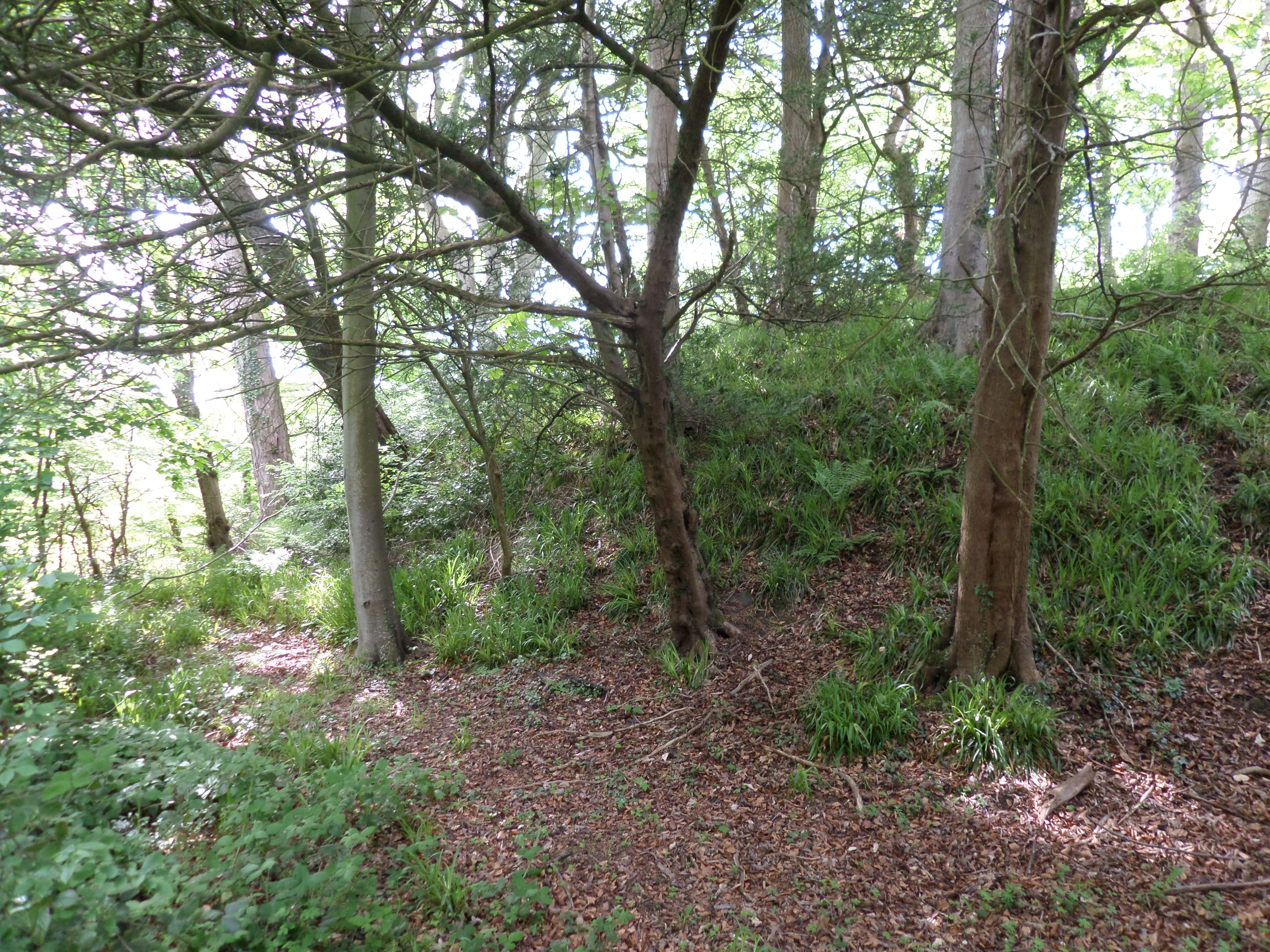
The mote hill and site of the ditch.

Alloway Mote stands at the tip of a pronounced meander of the River Doon just to the south of the connection between Murdoch's Lone and Doonholm Road, between the river and the entrance road to the Doonholm Estate; a 19th-century lodge house stands on the other side of this estate road. Alloway Mote's position is on a steep bluff and erosion has resulted in part of the earthwork collapsing into the river so any defensive features here have been lost. Bridgend Castle stands nearby on the west bank of the River Doon and is thought to have been held by the Montgomerie clan.

== Description ==
The remnants of a moat or ditch are discernible and the summit of the mote has a D-shaped concavity that is defended on the landward sides by a substantial and steep curved earth bank. The approximate internal width is 10 m (33 ft), and the substantial earth bank is up to 9 m (30 ft) thick and has a height above the interior floor of 1.8 m (6 ft). The exterior height from ground level is around 5 m (16 ft). Beech tree plantings, natural scrub and a typical woodland sward covers the ring-work that was once ringed with a wood palisade rather than a stone wall.

== History ==
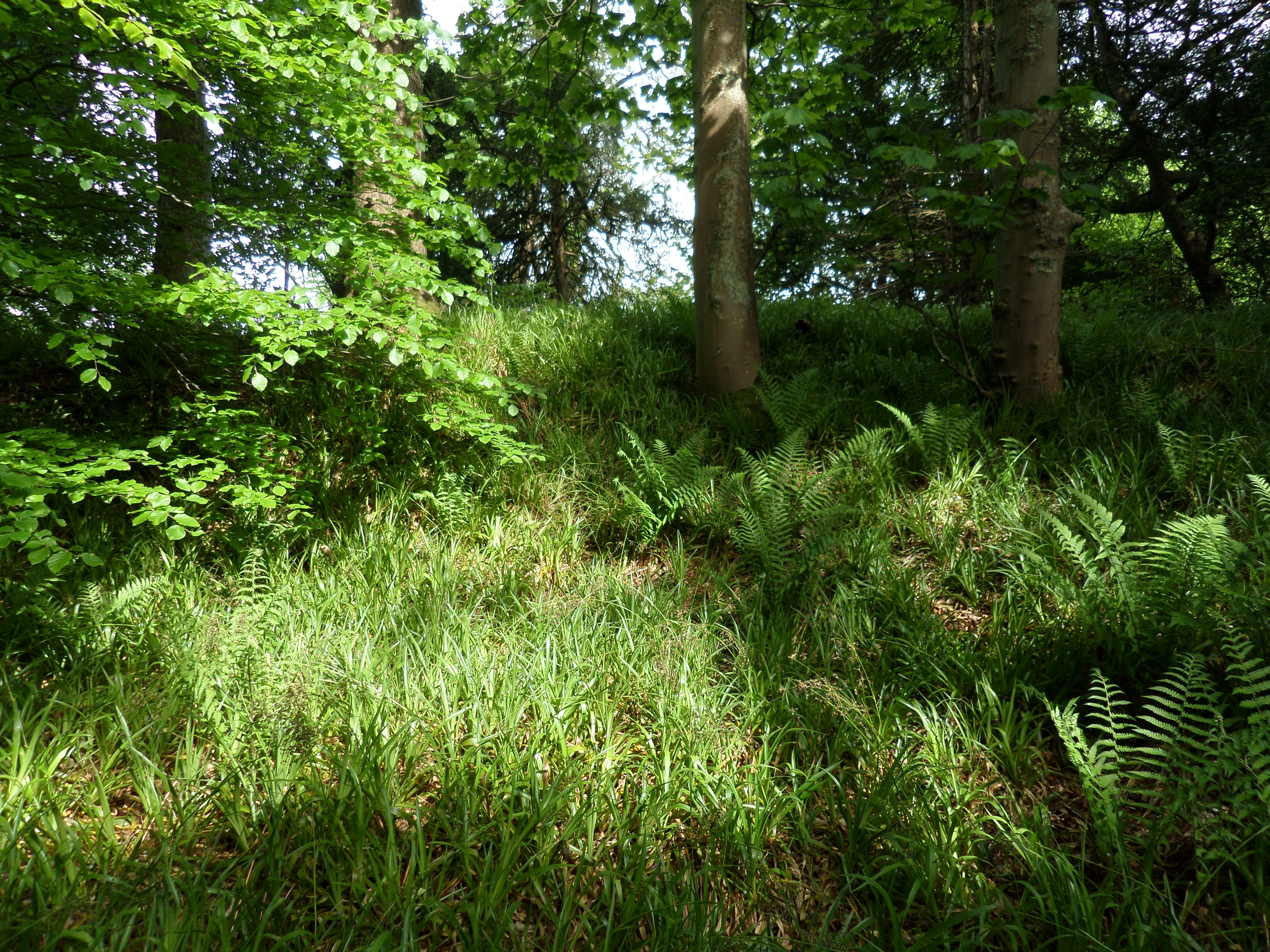
The D-shaped bowl-like interior.

In the 12th century the River Doon is thought to have represented the physical boundary between the kingdoms of the Scots and that of Galloway. Alloway therefore, situated as it is in South Kyle, was on the border with Carrick and after the defeat of the Galloway forces a peace agreement was reached 1186. At this time a number of ringwork castles were erected at Dunduff and Greenan, suggesting that Alloway Mote was built at this time to help impose the royal control at this old boundary, in line with the introduction of feudal control of the area. Ayr Castle was built in 1197 and the focus of military and judicial control shifted to Ayr resulting in the abandonment of Alloway Mote.

The historian John Smith in the 1890s visited the site and refers to it as a "moat, court-hill, tumulus or mound", and stated that according to the Ayr Town Records it had been used as an open air court where trials had taken place. He states that its appearance does not fully coincide with a typical court hill but puts that down to the activity of treasure hunters. Recent study of the Ayr records however show that the Ayr tolbooth was the usual meeting place for the courts casting doubt on Smith's statement.

It is likely that a domestic settlement was associated with Alloway Mote, but archaeological excavations have so far failed to find any evidence to confirm this or to suggest a likely location.

== Bibliography ==
- Campbell, Thorbjorn (2003). Ayrshire. A Historical Guide. Edinburgh: Birlinn. ISBN 1-84158-267-0.
- Smith, J. (1895) Prehistoric man in Ayrshire. London: Elliot Stock.
