= Chaffcombe =

Village and civil parish in Somerset, England

Coordinates: 50.887322°N 2.922457°W

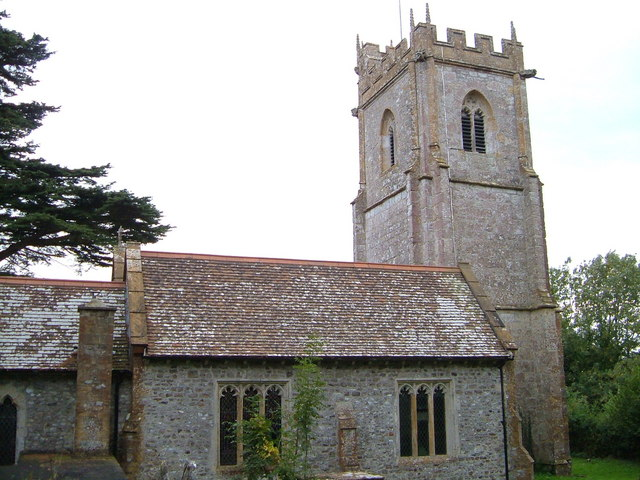
- St Michael and All Angels

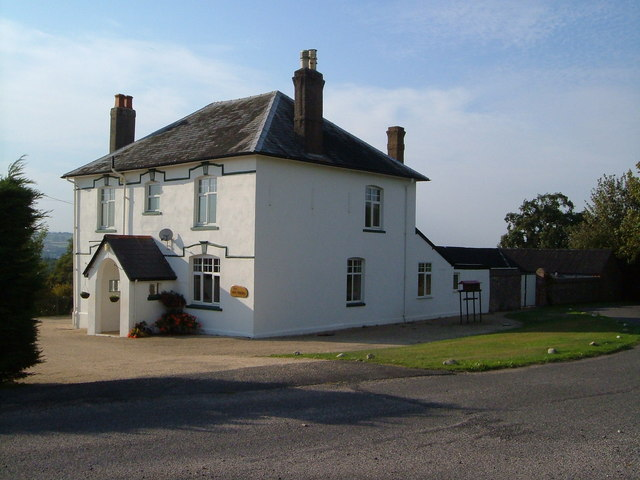
- The Old Happy

- Location within Somerset
- Population: 229 (2011)
- OS grid reference: ST352101
- Civil parish: Chard
- Unitary authority: Somerset Council
- Ceremonial county: Somerset
- Region: South West
- Country: England
- Sovereign state: United Kingdom
- Post town: CHARD
- Postcode district: TA20
- Dialling code: 01460
- Police: Avon and Somerset
- Fire: Devon and Somerset
- Ambulance: South Western
- UK Parliament: Yeovil

Chaffcombe is a village and civil parish in Somerset, England, situated 2 miles (3.2 km) north east of Chard. The village has a population of 229.

== History ==
The name of the village probably comes from a Saxon settler and means "Ceaffa's valley". After the Norman Conquest Chaffcombe was granted to the Bishop of Coutances under whom it was held by Ralph le Sor until it was acquired by Oliver Avenel (died 1226) and inherited by his descendants until 1613 when John Poulett of Hinton St George became lord of the manor and stayed in the Poulett family until 1913.

The parish of Chaffcombe was part of the South Petherton Hundred.

== Governance ==
The parish council has responsibility for local issues, including setting an annual precept (local rate) to cover the council's operating costs and producing annual accounts for public scrutiny. The parish council evaluates local planning applications and works with the local police, district council officers, and neighbourhood watch groups on matters of crime, security, and traffic. The parish council's role also includes initiating projects for the maintenance and repair of parish facilities, as well as consulting with the district council on the maintenance, repair, and improvement of highways, drainage, footpaths, public transport, and street cleaning. Conservation matters (including trees and listed buildings) and environmental issues are also the responsibility of the council.

For local government purposes, since 1 April 2023, the parish comes under the unitary authority of Somerset Council. Prior to this, it was part of the non-metropolitan district of South Somerset (established under the Local Government Act 1972). It was part of Chard Rural District before 1974.

It is also part of the Yeovil county constituency represented in the House of Commons of the Parliament of the United Kingdom. It elects one Member of Parliament (MP) by the first past the post system of election.

== Landmarks ==
Avishays on Whiteway Hill is a large detached house which was partly built in the 17th century, but substantially altered between 1745 and 1759. The building was first recorded in 1316 as Aveneleseigh, from Oliver Avenel, and then changed hands many times. In the 17th century the Browne family leased it to the Sealy family, who purchased it in 1697, thereafter descendants of the Sealy family held it until it was sold to a Chard solicitor, Edward Clarke, in 1859. In the grounds are an 18th-century former stables and coach house, ice house and various other outbuildings.

The Clock Turret about 180 metres east of Avishays, which is also known as the Monmouth Tower or The Castle, is a 19th-century folly. It stands on the site of a former sham castle which had fallen into ruin, and served as a water tower as well as having a clock on the west side facing the house. The clock, which has a hand wound mechanism, was built by Gillett and Johnson of Croydon and was originally at Highclere Castle in Hampshire. The name Monmouth Tower comes from the escape of Elias Sealy, who owned the house, a follower of the Duke of Monmouth during the Monmouth Rebellion, who hid in a tree in the grounds when the troops of James II came looking for him.

== Religious sites ==
The Anglican parish Church of St Michael and All Angels has a tower which partly dates from the 15th century, the remainder being rebuilt under J. M. Allen between 1857 and 1860. It has been designated as a Grade II* listed building. There is a copy of Raphael's Madonna and Child in the north aisle, which was acquired in 1901.
