= Greenan Castle =

Castle in South Ayrshire, Scotland

- Ayr, South Ayrshire, Scotland
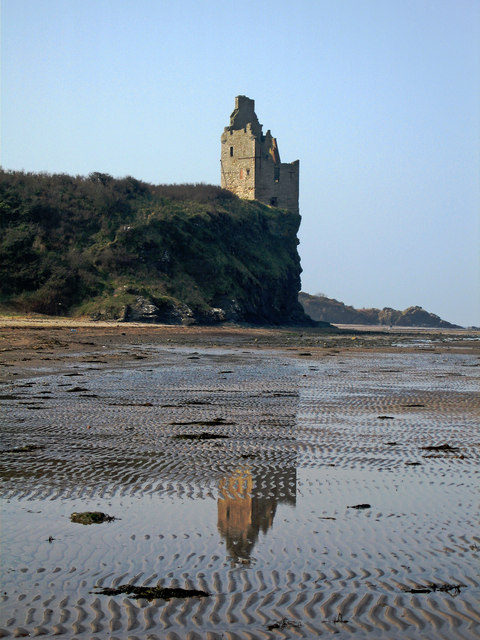
- Greenan Castle from the east

Site information
- Type: Tower house
- Open to the public: Private
- Condition: Ruin

Location
- Shown within Scotland
- Location within Scotland
- Coordinates: 55.4386°N 4.6700°W

Site history
- Built: 16th century

Greenan Castle is a 16th-century ruined tower house, around 2 1/2 miles (4 kilometres) southwest of Ayr in South Ayrshire, Scotland. Situated at the top of a sea cliff, it was originally a promontory fort converted into a motte-and-bailey in the 12th century. In the 15th century a tower house was built by the Lords of the Isles, which later passed into the hands of the Kennedy family.

== History ==
The lands of Greenan were forfeited by John, Earl of Ross and Lord of the Isles in 1476 for treason against James III. In 1493 James IV granted the Lands of Greenan to William Douglas, son of Archibald, Earl of Angus.

The first known defensive structure on the site was a promontory fort, probably a fortified farmstead, enclosing around 1 acre (0.4 hectares). Four concentric curved ditches, each around 3 metres (10 ft) wide, cut off the headland with the exception of a single causeway to provide access. It is not known how long this settlement was occupied, but the site was re-used in the twelfth century.

Beside the tower are traces of a walled courtyard and outbuildings—probably stables and a kitchen block, as the small tower has no kitchen within its walls. In this courtyard on the morning of 12 May 1602, Sir Thomas Kennedy of Culzean and his servant, Lancelot Kennedy, mounted their horses to ride to Edinburgh, having spent the night before with Thomas's half-brother, John Kennedy of Baltersan. Just a few miles away in the woods of St Leonards (now a suburb of Ayr), they were ambushed by Thomas Kennedy (of Drummurchie), Thomas Kennedy (brother to the Laird of Bargany), Walter Muir of Cloncaird, Thomas M'Alexander, Thomas Wallace, a boy called Gilbert Ramsay and a borderer, Williame Irrwing. Sir Thomas was murdered in retaliation for the death of the young Laird of Bargany in December, 1601 at the Battle of Brockloch, near Maybole. Years later, the Muirs of Auchindrain (father and son) were executed for their "art and part" in this murder. The story inspired Sir Walter Scott to write a short play, "An Ayrshire Tragedy".

The castle passed through various members of the clan before ending up in the hands of Thomas Kennedy, Earl of Cassillis in 1766. Around this time the residential use of the castle seems to have stopped; today the structure is a ruin.

== Notable features ==
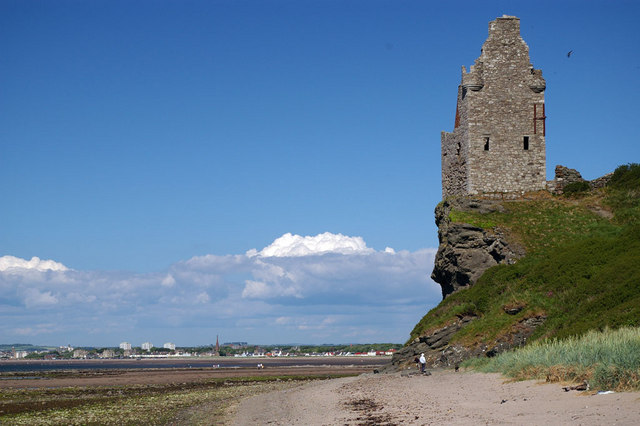
Greenan Castle from the west

The entrance lintel has the inscription, JK 1603 FND, for John Kennedy of Baltersan and his second wife, Florence NickDowall, who held the lands, Greenan Mill, and salmon fishing rights on the River Doon at that time.

== See also ==
- Alloway Mote
