= Gilbert Kennedy, 2nd Earl of Cassilis =

Scottish nobleman

Gilbert Kennedy, 2nd Earl of Cassillis (Scottish Gaelic: Gille-Brigte Mac Cinnéide) (1494–between 24 and 30 August 1527) was a Scottish nobleman, the son of David Kennedy, 1st Earl of Cassilis and Agnes, daughter of William Borthwick, 3rd Lord Borthwick.

In August 1524 Margaret Tudor sent him to England with Adam Otterburn and Scot of Balwearie to negotiate peace, and a possible marriage for James V with Princess Mary.

He was murdered at Prestwick by the followers of Hew Campbell of Loudon, sheriff of Ayr in August 1527, over a quarrel about the lands of Turnberry. The Gaelic song 'Òran Bagraidh' may relate to this event.

== Marriage and family ==
He was married to Lady Isabel Campbell, daughter of Archibald Campbell, 2nd Earl Argyll and Elizabeth Stewart. Their children included:

1. Janet Kennedy (d. 1566)
2. David Kennedy of Culzean
3. Gilbert Kennedy, 3rd Earl of Cassilis (born 1515, died 28 November 1558)
4. Lady Helen Kennedy Adair (Born 1518, Died 19 November 1576)

Peerage of Scotland
Preceded by David Kennedy	Earl of Cassilis; 1513–1527	Succeeded by Gilbert Kennedy
