= Angus Kennedy, 6th Marquess of Ailsa =

Scottish peer (1882–1957)

The Most Honourable The Marquess of Ailsa
- Kennedy in January 1934
- Born: 28 October 1882; Culzean Castle, Ayrshire, Scotland
- Died: 31 May 1957 (aged 74)
- Spouse: Gertrude Cooper (m. 1922)
- Children: Archibald Kennedy
- Father: Archibald Kennedy
- Military career
- Service: Royal Air Force
- Rank: Captain

Angus Kennedy, 6th Marquess of Ailsa (28 October 1882 – 31 May 1957), styled Lord Angus Kennedy until 1 June 1956, was a Scottish engineer, peer, and chief of Clan Kennedy. He held the titles for exactly 365 days before his death.

== Early life and education ==
Kennedy was born at Culzean Castle, Ayrshire, the third son of Archibald Kennedy, 3rd Marquess of Ailsa and his first wife, Hon. Evelyn Stuart. He was known as Lord Angus Kennedy until 1956.

He was educated at Eton College.

== Career ==
Kennedy gained the rank of lieutenant in the Royal Naval Volunteer Reserve and the rank of captain in the Royal Air Force.

Kennedy succeeded to the titles of 17th Earl of Cassillis, 19th Lord Kennedy, 6th Marquess of Ailsa & 6th Baron Ailsa on 1 June 1956.

== Personal life ==
He married Gertrude Millicent Cooper (daughter of Gervas Weir Cooper, of Wordwell Hall, Bury St Edmunds, Suffolk) on 28 January 1922 and they had one child:

- Archibald Kennedy, 7th Marquess of Ailsa (1925–1994)

Lord Ailsa died on 31 May 1957 and was succeeded in his titles by his only son, Archibald.

Peerage of the United Kingdom
Preceded by Charles Kennedy	Marquess of Ailsa; 1956–1957	Succeeded by Archibald Kennedy
