= Marquess of Ailsa =

Title in the Peerage of the United Kingdom

Marquessate of Ailsa
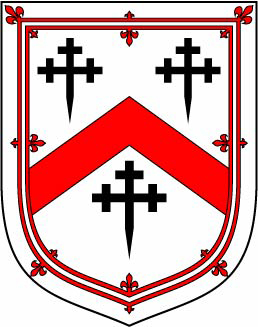
- Arms of Kennedy, Marquesses of Ailsa: Argent, a Chevron Gules, between three crosses-Crosslet fitchée Sable, the whole within a Double-Tressure flory counterflory of the second. Crest: A Dolphin naiant proper. Supporters: On either side, a Swan wings inverted proper, beaked and membered Gules
- Creation date: 10 September 1831
- Created by: King William IV
- Peerage: Peerage of the United Kingdom
- First holder: Archibald Kennedy, 1st Marquess of Ailsa
- Present holder: David Kennedy, 9th Marquess of Ailsa
- Heir apparent: Archibald Kennedy, Earl of Cassillis
- Remainder to: The 1st Marquess' heirs male of the body lawfully begotten
- Subsidiary titles: Earl of Cassillis; Lord Kennedy; Baron Ailsa
- Status: Extant
- Former seats: Culzean Castle; Cassillis House
- Motto: AVISE LA FIN (Consider the end)

Marquess of Ailsa, of the Ailsa Craig in the County of Ayr, is a title in the Peerage of the United Kingdom. It was created on 10 September 1831 for Archibald Kennedy, 12th Earl of Cassillis. The title Earl of Cassillis (pronounced "Cass-ells") had been created in 1509 for the 3rd Lord Kennedy. This title had been created in the Peerage of Scotland in 1457. The 1st Marquess had been created Baron Ailsa in the Peerage of the United Kingdom on 12 November 1806.

The name of the title was taken from the Island of Ailsa Craig in the Firth of Clyde.

James Kennedy, Archbishop of St Andrews, was the younger brother of the first Lord Kennedy.

The Marquess of Ailsa is the hereditary Clan Chief of Clan Kennedy.

The family's seats were Cassillis House and Culzean Castle, near Maybole, Ayrshire.

== Lords Kennedy (1457) ==
- Gilbert Kennedy, 1st Lord Kennedy (c. 1406–c. 1480)
- John Kennedy, 2nd Lord Kennedy (died 1508)
- David Kennedy, 3rd Lord Kennedy (died 1513) (created Earl of Cassillis in 1509)

== Earls of Cassillis (1509) ==
- David Kennedy, 1st Earl of Cassillis (1463–1513)
- Gilbert Kennedy, 2nd Earl of Cassillis (died 1527)
- Gilbert Kennedy, 3rd Earl of Cassillis (1515–1558)
- Gilbert Kennedy, 4th Earl of Cassillis (c. 1541–1576)
- John Kennedy, 5th Earl of Cassillis (c. 1573–1615)
- John Kennedy, 6th Earl of Cassillis (died 1668)
- John Kennedy, 7th Earl of Cassillis (1653–1701)
- John Kennedy, 8th Earl of Cassillis (1700–1759)

From 1759 to 1762 the titles and estates were in dispute between the heir male and the heir general. The latter, William [Douglas], Earl of Ruglen and March later Duke of Queensberry, was son and heir of William [Douglas], Earl of March, by his wife Anne [Hamilton], suo jure Countess of Ruglen, 1st dau. and heir of line of John [Hamilton], Earl of Selkirk and Ruglen, by his first wife Lady Anne Kennedy, the only daughter that had issue of John [Kennedy], 7th Earl of Cassillis. He claimed the estates under an entail of 5 September 1698, which he contended could not be set aside by the entail of 1759. The entail of 1759 was however upheld, though by a narrow majority, in the Court of Session, and confirmed, on appeal, by the House of Lords. He then, under the designation of "William, Earl of Cassillis, Ruglen and March" claimed "the titles and honours of Earl of Cassillis and Lord Kennedy," on the ground of certain charters of 24 April 1641 and 29 September 1642. Sir Thomas Kennedy, Bart., claimed the said titles as heir male, and the two petitions having been laid before the House of Lords, it was adjudged, 27 January 1762, that the latter had a right "to the honour and dignity of Earl of Cassillis as heir male of the body of David, the 1st Earl of Cassillis, and [to that] of Lord Kennedy as heir male of the body of Gilbert, the 1st Lord Kennedy."

- Thomas Kennedy, 9th Earl of Cassillis (died 1775), previously the 4th Baronet of Culzean
- David Kennedy, 10th Earl of Cassillis (died 1792)
- Archibald Kennedy, 11th Earl of Cassillis (died 1794)
- Archibald Kennedy, 12th Earl of Cassillis (1770–1846) (created Baron Ailsa in 1806 and Marquess of Ailsa in 1831)

== Marquesses of Ailsa (1831) ==
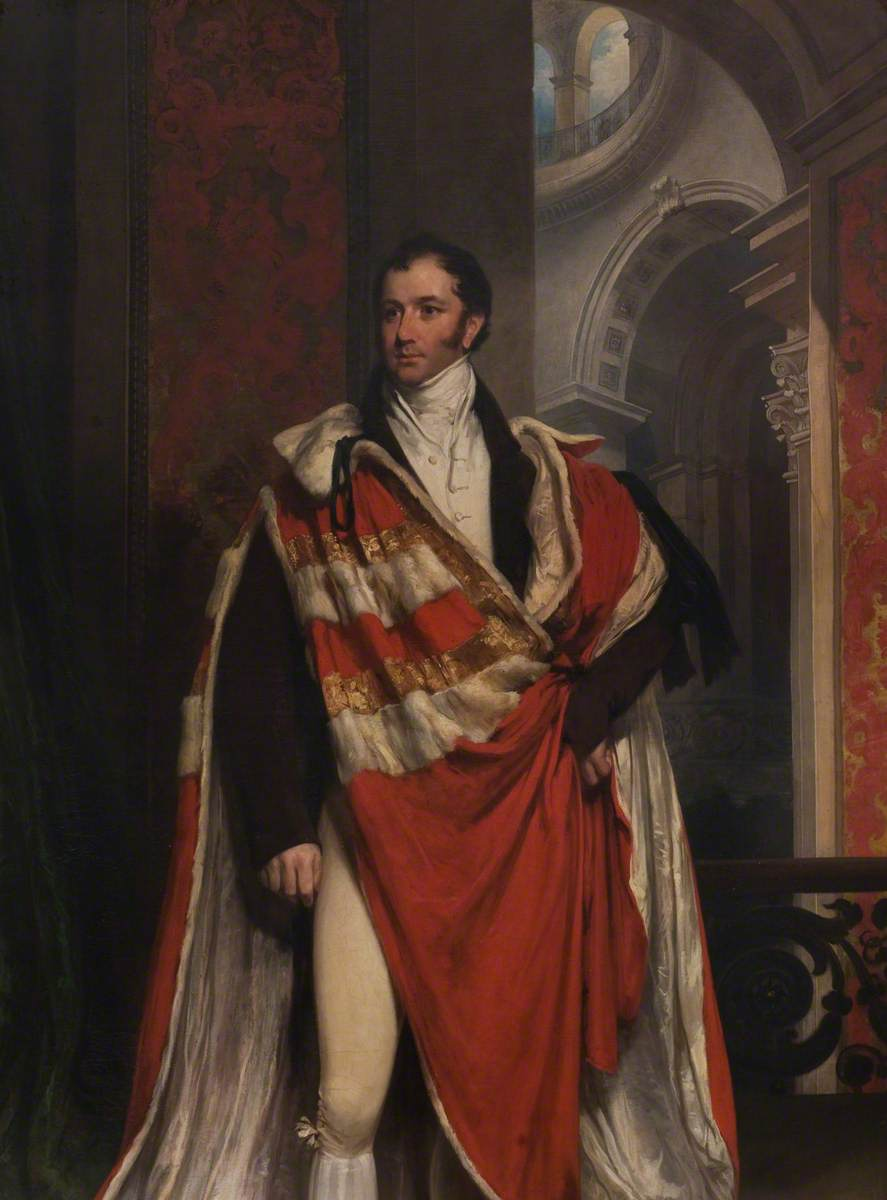
1st Marquess of Ailsa by William Owen, 1816

- Archibald Kennedy, 1st Marquess of Ailsa (1770–1846)
- Archibald Kennedy, 2nd Marquess of Ailsa (1816–1870)
- Archibald Kennedy, 3rd Marquess of Ailsa (1847–1938)
- Archibald Kennedy, 4th Marquess of Ailsa (1872–1943)
- Charles Kennedy, 5th Marquess of Ailsa (1875–1956)
- Angus Kennedy, 6th Marquess of Ailsa (1882–1957)
- Archibald David Kennedy, 7th Marquess of Ailsa (1925–1994)
- Archibald Angus Charles Kennedy, 8th Marquess of Ailsa (1956–2015)
- David Thomas Kennedy, 9th Marquess of Ailsa (b. 1958)

== Present peer ==
David Thomas Kennedy, 9th Marquess of Ailsa (born 3 July 1958) is the younger son of the 7th Marquess of Ailsa and his wife Mary Burn and was educated at Strathallan School in Perthshire and the Berkshire College of Agriculture.

He took over running the Ailsa estate in 1979. His older brother, an alcoholic, inherited only the peerages and the island of Ailsa Craig, which he put up for sale in 2011. To save it for the family, the future 9th Marquess bought it.

As Lord David Kennedy, in 1991 he married Anne Kelly, daughter of Bernard Kelly, and they have two children:

- Lady Katherine Jean Kennedy (born 1993)
- Archibald David Kennedy, Earl of Cassilis (born 1995)

On 16 January 2015, he succeeded his older brother as Marquess of Ailsa (1831), Earl of Cassillis (1509), Baron Ailsa (1806) and Lord Kennedy (1458).

== Succession and family tree ==
Line of succession
- Archibald Kennedy, 11th Earl of Cassillis (1720–1794)
  - Archibald Kennedy, 1st Marquess of Ailsa (1770–1846)
    - Archibald Kennedy IV, Earl of Cassillis (1794–1832)
      - Archibald Kennedy, 2nd Marquess of Ailsa (1816–1870)
        - Archibald Kennedy, 3rd Marquess of Ailsa (1847–1938)
          - Archibald Kennedy, 4th Marquess of Ailsa (1872–1943)
          - Charles Kennedy, 5th Marquess of Ailsa (1875–1956)
          - Angus Kennedy, 6th Marquess of Ailsa (1882–1957)
            - Archibald David Kennedy, 7th Marquess of Ailsa (1925–1994)
              - Charles Kennedy, 8th Marquess of Ailsa (1956–2015)
              - David Thomas Kennedy, 9th Marquess of Ailsa (b. 1958)
                - (1). Archibald David Kennedy, Earl of Cassillis (b. 1995)
      - Gilbert Kennedy (1822–1901)
        - John Gilbert Kennedy (1854–1923)
          - Nigel Augustus Kennedy (1886–1957)
            - Ian Michael Godfrey Kennedy (1921–2011)
              - (2). Angus Michael David Kennedy (b. 1962)
                - (3). Louis Michael James Kennedy (b. 1998)
  - Robert Kennedy (1773–1843)
    - John Kennedy (d. 1845)
      - Edward Briggs Kennedy (1842–1914)
        - Edward Coverley Kennedy (1879–1939)
          - Ludovic Kennedy (1919–2009)
            - male issue in remainder to earldom

Family tree of the Marquess of Ailsa, Earl of Eglinton, and Earl of Cassilis

Robert III c. 1337–1406; King of Scotland
Lord Montgomerie, 1448
Alexander Montgomerie d. 1470; 1st Lord Montgomerie	James Kennedy; Younger of Dunure	Mary Stewart
Lord Kennedy, 1457
Alexander Montgomerie; 1404–1452 styled Master of Montgomerie	Elizabeth	Gilbert Kennedy c. 1406 – c. 1480; 1st Lord Kennedy	James Kennedy c. 1408–1465; Archbishop of St Andrews
Alexander Montgomerie d. c. 1483; 2nd Lord Montgomerie	Catherine	Colin Campbell c. 1433–1493; 1st Earl of Argyll	John Kennedy; 1454–1508; 2nd Lord Kennedy
Earl of Eglinton, 1506	Earl of Cassillis, 1234
Hugh Montgomerie c. 1460–1545; 1st Earl of Eglinton, 3rd Lord Montgomerie	Helen	Archibald Campbell d. 1513; 2nd Earl of Argyll	David Kennedy; After 1463–1513; 1st Earl of Cassilis, 3rd Lord Kennedy
John Montgomerie d. 1520	Isabel	Gilbert Kennedy; 1494–1527; 2nd Earl of Cassilis, 4th Lord Kennedy
Hugh Montgomerie d. 1546; 2nd Earl of Eglinton, 4th Lord Montgomerie	Gilbert Kennedy; 1515–1558; 3rd Earl of Cassillis, 5th Lord Kennedy
Hugh Montgomerie c. 1531–1585; 3rd Earl of Eglinton, 5th Lord Montgomerie	Gilbert Kennedy c. 1541–1576; 4th Earl of Cassilis, 6th Lord Kennedy	Thomas Kennedy c. 1549–1602 styled Master of Cassillis
Hugh Montgomerie; 1563–1586; 4th Earl of Eglinton, 6th Lord Montgomerie	Margaret	Robert Seton; 1553–1603; 1st Earl of Winton	John Kennedy; 1575–1615; 5th Earl of Cassillis, 7th Lord Kennedy	Hew Kennedy styled Master of Cassillis	Alexander Kennedy d. 1652
Hugh Montgomerie d. 1612; 5th Earl of Eglinton, 7th Lord Montgomerie	Alexander Montgomerie; 1588–1661; 6th Earl of Eglinton, 8th Lord Montgomerie	John Kennedy d. 1668; 6th Earl of Cassillis, 8th Lord Kennedy	John Kennedy d. 1665	Alexander Kennedy d. 1698
Hugh Montgomerie; 1613–1669; 7th Earl of Eglinton, 9th Lord Montgomerie	James Montgomerie of Coylsfield d. 1675	John Kennedy; 1653–1701; 7th Earl of Cassillis, 9th Lord Kennedy
Kennedy Baronet of Culzean, in the County of Ayr, 1682
Alexander Montgomerie d. 1701; 8th Earl of Eglinton, 10th Lord Montgomerie	Hugh Montgomery	John Kennedy c. 1672–1700 styled Lord Kennedy	Archibald Kennedy d. 1710; 1st Kennedy Baronet of Culzean
Alexander Seton Montgomerie c. 1660–1729; 9th Earl of Eglinton, 11th Lord Montgomerie	Susanna Montgomerie; 1690–1780	Alexander Montgomerie d. 1783	John Kennedy; 1700–1759; 8th Earl of Cassillis, 10th Lord Kennedy	John Kennedy d. 1742; 2nd Kennedy Baronet of Culzean	Archibald Kennedy; 1685–1763
Alexander Montgomerie; 1723–1769; 10th Earl of Eglinton, 12th Lord Montgomerie	Archibald Montgomerie; 1726–1796; 11th Earl of Eglinton, 13th Lord Montgomerie	Hugh Montgomerie; 1739–1819; 12th Earl of Eglinton, 14th Lord Montgomerie, 1st Baron Ardrossan	John Kennedy d. 1744; 3rd Kennedy Baronet of Culzean	Thomas Kennedy d. 1775; 9th Earl of Cassillis, 11th Lord Kennedy, 4th Kennedy Baronet of Culzean	David Kennedy before 1734–1792; 10th Earl of Cassillis, 12th Lord Kennedy, 5th Kennedy Baronet of Culzean	Archibald Kennedy; 1720–1794; 11th Earl of Cassillis, 13th Lord Kennedy
Kennedy Baronet of Culzean extinct, 1792
Baron Ailsa, of Ailsa in the County of Ayr, 1806; Marquess of Ailsa, 1831
Mary Montgomerie d. 1848	Archibald Montgomerie; 1773–1814 styled Lord Montgomerie	Archibald Kennedy; 1770–1846; 1st Marquess of Ailsa, etc. 12th Earl of Cassillis, 14th Lord Kennedy
Archibald Kennedy IV; 1794–1832 styled Earl of Cassilis
Earl of Winton (2nd creation) and Baron Seton and Tranent, 1859
Archibald William Montgomerie; 1812–1861; 13th Earl of Eglinton, 1st Earl of Winton, etc., 15th Lord Montgomerie	Archibald Kennedy; 1816–1870; 2nd Marquess of Ailsa, etc. 13th Earl of Cassillis, 15th Lord Kennedy
Archibald William Montgomerie; 1841–1892; 14th Earl of Eglinton, 2nd Earl of Winton, etc., 16th Lord Montgomerie	George Arnulph Montgomerie; 1848–1919; 15th Earl of Eglinton, 3rd Earl of Winton, etc., 17th Lord Montgomerie	Archibald Kennedy; 1847–1838; 3rd Marquess of Ailsa, etc. 14th Earl of Cassillis, 16th Lord Kennedy
Archibald Seton Montgomerie; 1880–1945; 16th Earl of Eglinton, 4th Earl of Winton, etc., 18th Lord Montgomerie	Archibald Kennedy; 1872–1943; 4th Marquess of Ailsa, etc. 15th Earl of Cassillis, 17th Lord Kennedy	Charles Kennedy; 1875–1956; 5th Marquess of Ailsa, etc. 16th Earl of Cassillis, 18th Lord Kennedy	Angus Kennedy; 1882–1957; 6th Marquess of Ailsa, etc. 17th Earl of Cassillis, 19th Lord Kennedy
Archibald William Alexander Montgomerie; 1914–1966; 17th Earl of Eglinton, 5th Earl of Winton, etc., 19th Lord Montgomerie	Archibald David Kennedy; 1925–1997; 7th Marquess of Ailsa, etc. 18th Earl of Cassillis, 20th Lord Kennedy
Archibald George Montgomerie; 1939–2018; 18th Earl of Eglinton, 6th Earl of Winton, etc., 20th Lord Montgomerie
Hugh Archibald William Montgomerie b. 1966; 19th Earl of Eglinton, 7th Earl of Winton, etc., 21st Lord Montgomerie	Archibald Angus "Charles" Kennedy; 1956–2015; 8th Marquess of Ailsa, etc. 19th Earl of Cassillis, 21st Lord Kennedy	David Thomas Kennedy b. 1958; 9th Marquess of Ailsa, etc. 20th Earl of Cassillis, 22nd Lord Kennedy
Rhuridh Seton Archibald Montgomerie b. 2007 styled Lord Montgomerie	Archibald David Kennedy b. 1995 styled Earl of Cassillis
Heir apparent to the Earldom of Eglinton	Heir apparent to the Marquessate of Ailsa
