= John Baird (Royal Navy officer) =

Royal Navy Admiral (1832–1908)

Admiral Sir John Baird KCB
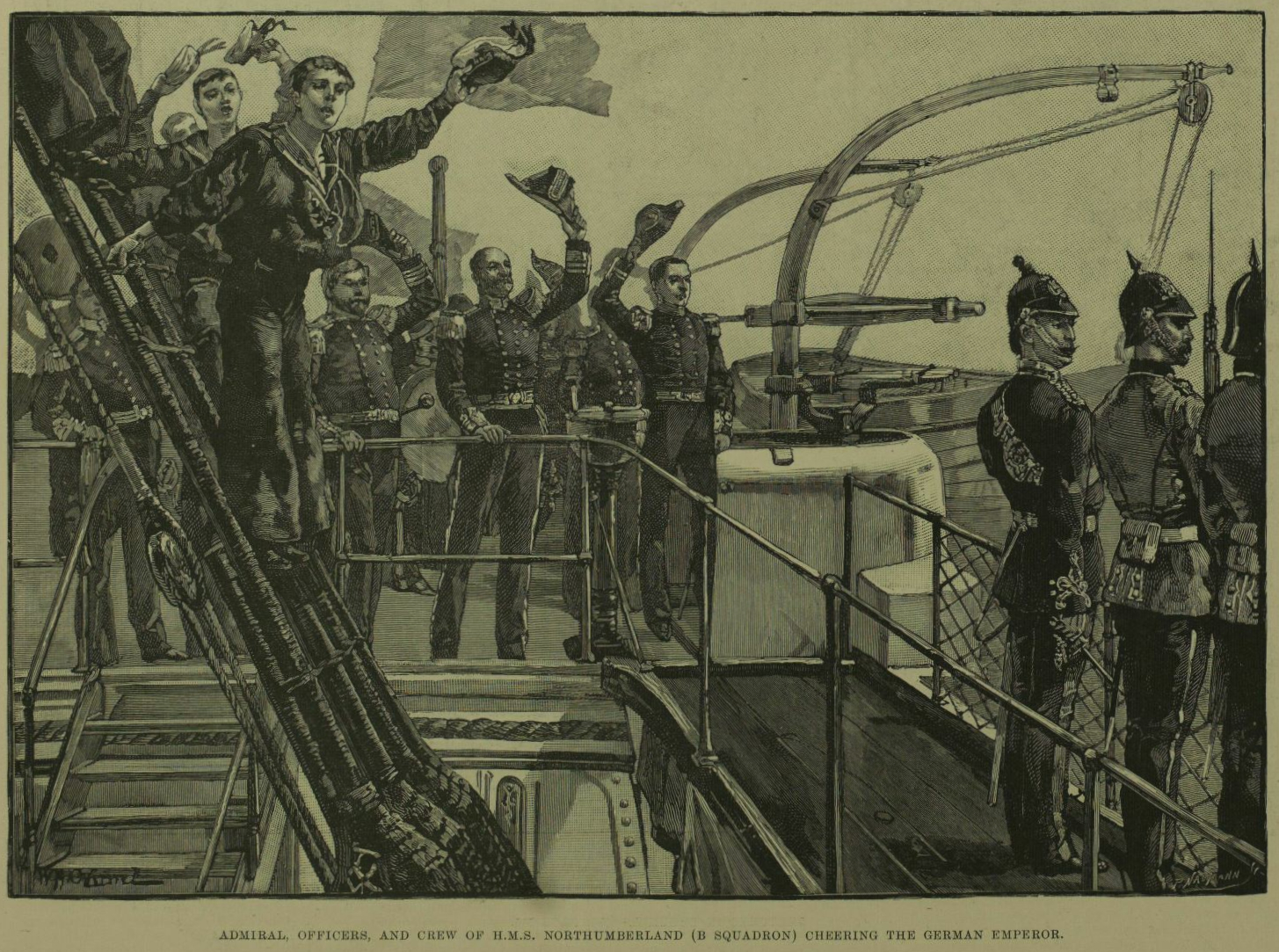
- Admiral Baird, officers, and crew of HMS Northumberland cheering the German Emperor in 1889
- Born: 16 September 1832
- Died: 8 December 1908 (aged 76)
- Military career
- Allegiance: United Kingdom
- Branch: Royal Navy
- Rank: Admiral
- Commands: Devastation; Alacrity; Juno; Pacific Station; Naval Reserves; Channel Squadron
- Awards: Knight Commander of the Order of the Bath

Admiral Sir John Kennedy Erskine Baird, KCB (16 September 1832 – 8 December 1908) was an officer in the Royal Navy, who is chiefly remembered for commanding the losing side in the 1888 annual naval manoeuvres.

== Early life ==
Baird was born on 16 September 1832, the son of Sir David Baird, 2nd Baronet (see Baird baronets) and Lady Anne Baird (née Kennedy).

== Naval career ==
Baird entered the Navy in December 1845. He was promoted to lieutenant on 28 February 1854. On 3 July 1857 he was promoted to commander. In 1858, he commanded the paddle-sloop Devastation on the North America and West Indies station. From 23 December 1859 to August 1863 he commanded the screw gun-vessel Alacrity in the Mediterranean.

Baird was promoted captain on 16 February 1864. From 8 March 1870 he commanded the screw-corvette Juno on the China station until she paid off at Sheerness on 14 June 1873. He commanded the ironclad battleship Swiftsure from 1874 to 1877 on the Mediterranean station.

Baird was Naval aide-de-camp to Queen Victoria from February to December 1878. Baird was promoted to rear-admiral on 28 December 1879. Baird was appointed Commander-in-Chief, Pacific Station on 13 September 1884, and assumed command on 3 November 1884. His flagship was first Swiftsure, and then her sister Triumph. His flag-lieutenant was Frank A Garforth and his secretary was Henry P. Brenan. His replacement was appointed on 4 July 1885. As of June 1885, his command consisted of: Constance, Heroine, Liffey, Pelican, Sappho, Satellite, Triumph, and Wild Swan.

Baird was promoted to vice-admiral on 18 January 1886. From 1886 to 1887, he was Admiral Superintendent, Naval Reserves with his flag in the ironclad battleship Hercules.

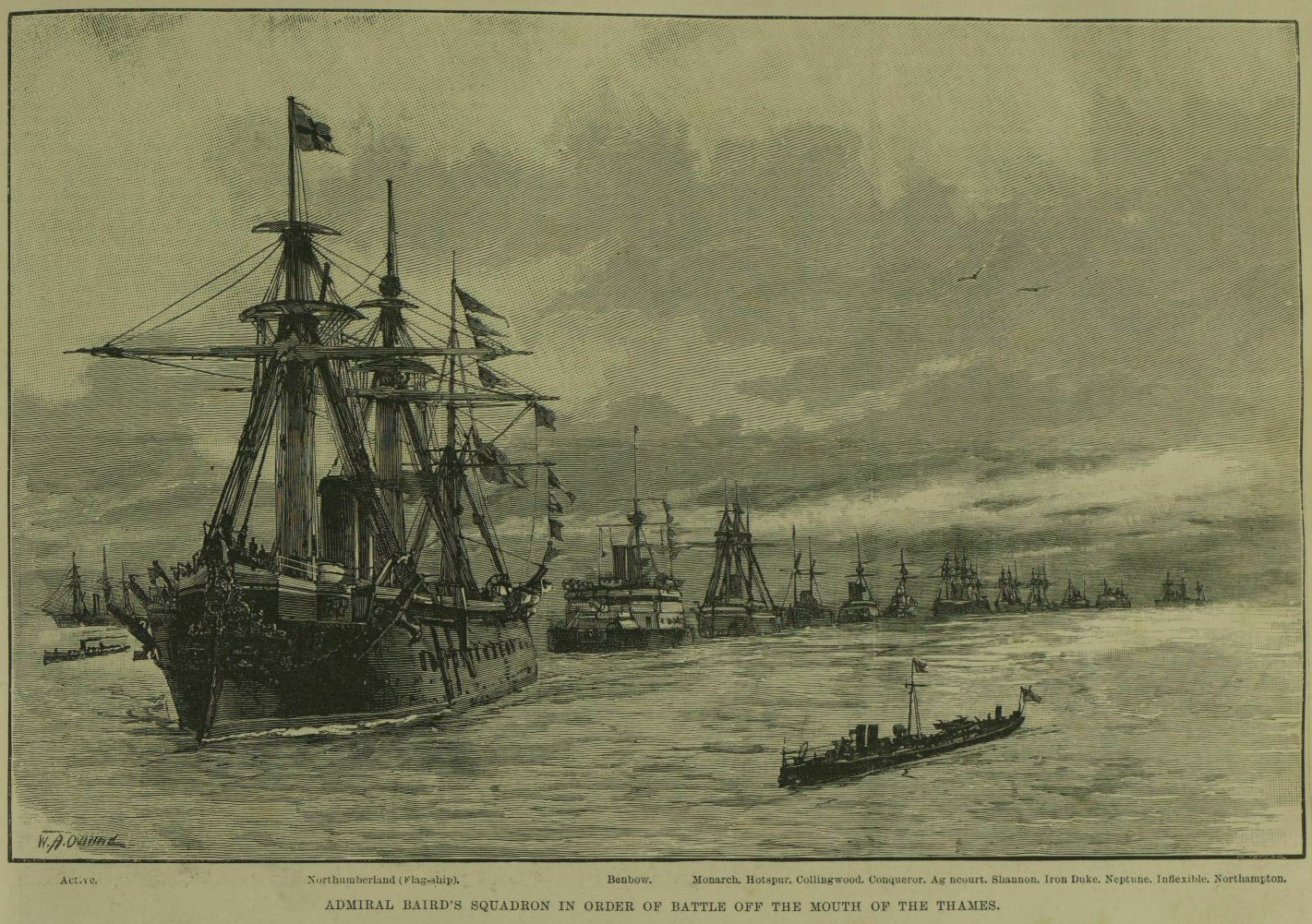
Admiral Baird's Squadron in order of battle off the mouth of The Thames, the Naval Manoeuvres of 1888

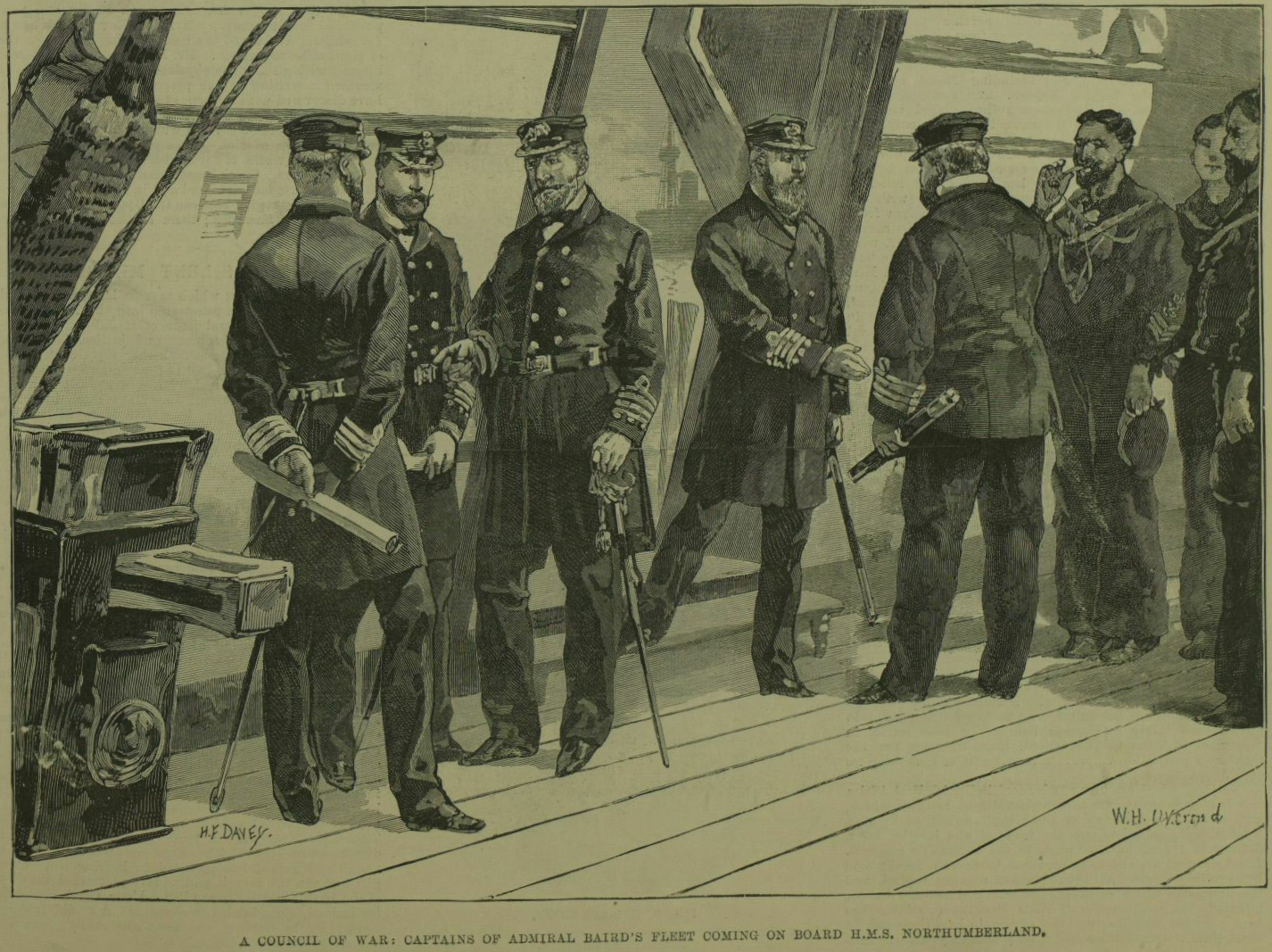
Captains of Admiral Baird's fleet coming on board HMS Northumberland, for a council of war during the Naval Manoeuvres of 1889

From 17 April 1888 to 3 May 1890, Baird was commander-in-chief of the Channel Squadron, with his flag in the ironclad battleship Northumberland. It was during this time that he commanded the losing side in the 1888 annual manoeuvres. In these manoeuvres, Baird's force of 26 major warships and 12 first class torpedo boats represented the British fleet, and England, Scotland and Wales were considered friendly to the British fleet and hostile to the enemy. Opposing Baird was the 'Achill' fleet of 19 major warships and 12 first class torpedo boats, led by Rear Admiral George Tryon, and based in Berehaven on the south-west coast of Ireland and Lough Swilly on the north coast. All Irish territory was considered hostile to the British fleet and friendly to the enemy. Hostilities broke out at noon on 24 July, and ended at noon on 20 August. At the outset Baird's fleet was concentrated on keeping Tryon's fleet shut up in their base ports. They failed. Both Tryon and his second in command broke the blockade on 4 August, and swooping round the extremities of Ireland, made a descent on British commerce and British ports.

Baird was promoted to admiral on 14 February 1892.

== Retirement and death ==
Baird retired an admiral on 16 September 1897. On 6 March 1905 he married Constance Barbara Clarke, daughter of Edward Clarke, of Avishays, Chard, Somerset. He died at Wootton, on the Isle of Wight on 8 December 1908. He had no children.

== Footnotes ==
Military offices
Preceded by Sir Algernon Lyons	Commander-in-Chief, Pacific Station; 1884–1885	Succeeded by Sir Michael Culme-Seymour
Preceded by Sir William Hewett	Commander-in-Chief, Channel Fleet; 1888–1890	Succeeded by Sir Michael Culme-Seymour
