= Archibald Kennedy, 4th Marquess of Ailsa =

Scottish peer, barrister, and soldier

The Most Honourable The Marquess of Ailsa DL, JP, FSRGS
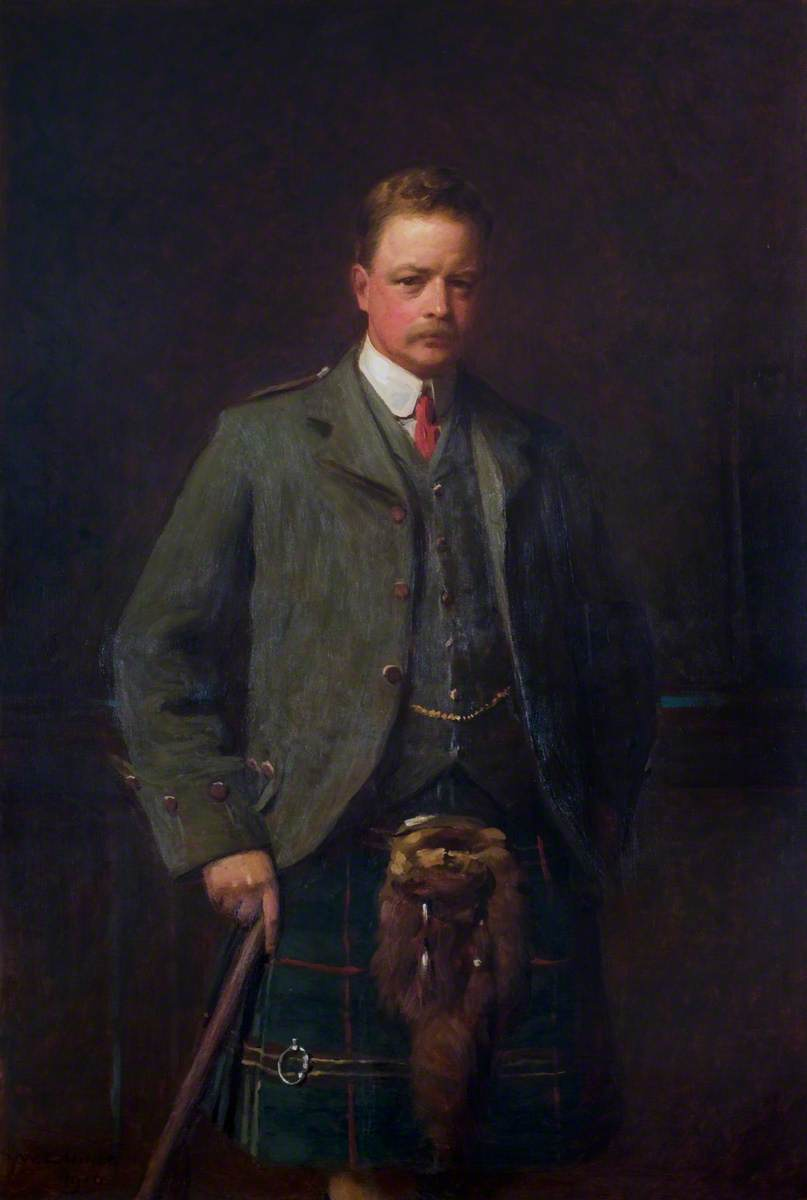
- Portrait of Lord Ailsa, by William Edwards Miller, 1910
- Born: Archibald Kennedy; 22 May 1872; Berkeley Square
- Died: 27 February 1943 (aged 70)
- Education: Monkton Combe School; Eton College; Trinity College, Cambridge
- Spouse: Frances Emily McTaggart-Stewart

Archibald Kennedy, 4th Marquess of Ailsa, DL, JP, FSRGS (22 May 1872 – 27 February 1943), styled Earl of Cassillis until 1938, was a Scottish peer, barrister and soldier.

== Early life ==
Styled Earl of Cassillis from birth, he was born at Berkeley Square, London, the eldest son of Archibald Kennedy, 3rd Marquess of Ailsa, and the Honourable Evelyn, daughter of Charles Stuart, 12th Lord Blantyre.

He was educated at Monkton Combe School, Eton, Trinity College, Cambridge and the University of Edinburgh and was admitted as an advocate in 1897.

== Career ==
Lord Cassillis was appointed a captain in the 3rd (Militia) Battalion of the Royal Scots Fusiliers on 7 January 1900, and served in the Second Boer War 1900–02, where he won two medals and five clasps. In the final months of this war, he was attached to the regular army from April to July 1902. Following the end of hostilities in early June 1902, he left Cape Town on board the SS Wakool, and arrived at Southampton the next month.

He was promoted to major in June 1911 and later served in the World War I. He was also a Deputy Lieutenant of Ayrshire and a Fellow of the Royal Scottish Geographical Society. In April 1938, aged 65, he succeeded his father in the marquessate.

== Personal life ==
Lord Ailsa married Frances Emily McTaggart-Stewart, daughter of Sir Mark MacTaggart-Stewart, 1st Baronet, on 20 April 1903. They had no children.

He died in February 1943, aged 70, and was succeeded by his younger brother, Charles Kennedy, 5th Marquess of Ailsa. The Marchioness of Ailsa died in October 1949.

Peerage of the United Kingdom
Preceded by Archibald Kennedy	Marquess of Ailsa; 1938–1943	Succeeded by Charles Kennedy
