= Archibald Kennedy, 3rd Marquess of Ailsa =

Scottish peer (1847–1938)

The Most Honourable The Marquess of Ailsa
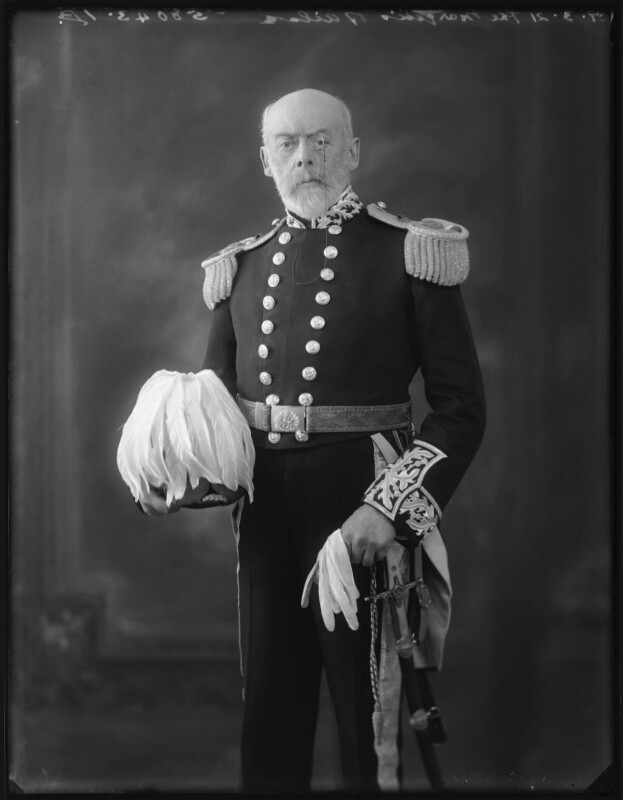
- The Marquess in March 1921

Lord Lieutenant of Ayrshire
- In office 1919–1937
- Preceded by: The Earl of Eglinton
- Succeeded by: Sir Charles Fergusson, Bt

Personal details
- Born: Archibald Kennedy; 1 September 1847 Culzean Castle, Ayrshire, Scotland
- Died: 9 April 1938 (aged 90) Culzean Castle, Ayrshire, Scotland
- Spouses: Hon. Evelyn Stuart (m. 1871; died 1888) Isabella MacMaster (1891–1938)
- Children: 7
- Parent(s): Julia Jephson; Archibald Kennedy, 2nd Marquess of Ailsa

Archibald Kennedy, 3rd Marquess of Ailsa (1 September 1847 – 9 April 1938) was a Scottish peer.

== Early life and education ==
Archibald was born in 1847 at Culzean Castle, the eldest of three sons born to Julia (née Jephson), Marchioness of Ailsa, and Archibald Kennedy, 2nd Marquess of Ailsa. Among his siblings was Maj. Lord Alexander Kennedy, Lord John Kennedy, Lady Julia Alice Kennedy, Lady Evelyn Anne Kennedy, and Lady Constance Eleanor Kennedy.

His father was the eldest son of Archibald Kennedy, Earl of Cassillis, himself the oldest son of Archibald Kennedy, 1st Marquess of Ailsa. His mother was the second daughter of Sir Richard Jephson, 1st Baronet and the former Charlotte Rochfort Smith.

He was educated at Eton.

== Career ==
In 1866, Kennedy joining the Coldstream Guards as an ensign. He was promoted lieutenant in 1870 and retired nine year later retired upon succeeding to the Marquessate and estates and joining the House of Lords.

In 1874, he was granted an honorary lieutenancy in the Royal Naval Reserve in 1874. In 1887, he became Lieutenant Commanding the Clyde Brigade, Royal Naval Artillery Volunteers, and in 1921 was made honorary captain of the Royal Naval Volunteer Reserve.

As a young man, he served as an officer in the Coldstream Guards. In 1885, he founded the Ailsa Shipbuilding Company, which was based in Troon and Ayr, Ayrshire.

=== Peerage ===
Upon the death of his father on 20 March 1870, he succeeded to the titles of 14th Earl of Cassillis, 16th Lord Kennedy, 3rd Marquess of Ailsa and 3rd Baron Ailsa. Along with the title came 76,000 acres in Ayrshire. He held the office of Lord-Lieutenant of Ayrshire between 1919 and 1937.

=== Sailing ===
The Marquess was a keen sailor, having studied navigation, and had William Fife build him Foxhound in 1870, Bloodhound in 1874, and Sleuthhound in 1881. He had his own shipyard at Culzean Castle, where he built the 5-ton Cocker.

At the time of his death, he was the oldest member of the Royal Yacht Squadron. In his will, he left the King of the Netherlands Cup, won by his yacht Sleuthhound in 1883, to the Royal Yacht Squadron.

== Personal life ==
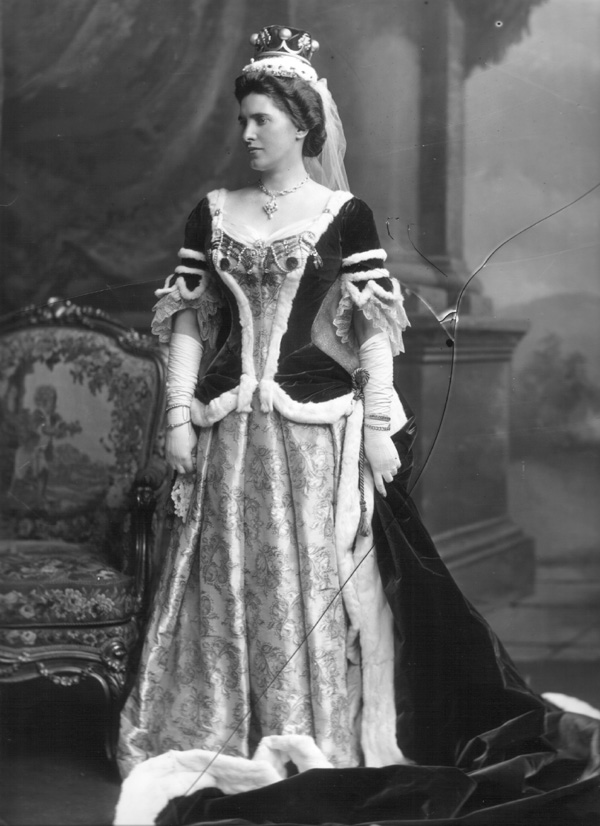
Isabella, Marchioness of Ailsa, née MacMaster, photographed 11 August 1902.

Lord Ailsa was twice married. His first marriage took place on 7 March 1871 to Hon. Evelyn Stuart, daughter of Charles Stuart, 12th Lord Blantyre and Lady Evelyn Sutherland-Leveson-Gower (herself a daughter of George Sutherland-Leveson-Gower, 2nd Duke of Sutherland). Together, they were the parents of five children:

- Archibald Kennedy, 4th Marquess of Ailsa (1872–1943), married Frances Stewart, daughter of Sir Mark MacTaggart-Stewart, 1st Baronet.
- Charles Kennedy, 5th Marquess of Ailsa (1875–1956), who married Constance Clarke, widow of Sir John Baird.
- Lady Evelyn Kennedy (5 April 1876 – 9 January 1886), died young
- Lady Aline Kennedy (31 July 1877 – 1 July 1957), married John Browne, 5th Baron Kilmaine (1878–1946) in 1901.
- Angus Kennedy, 6th Marquess of Ailsa (1882–1957), married Gertrude Millicent Cooper

He married secondly on 3 November 1891 to Isabella MacMaster, the only daughter of Hugh MacMaster, a market gardener of Kausani, India. Together, they had two more children:

- Lt.-Col. Lord Hugh Kennedy (19 January 1895 – 27 April 1970), married Katharine Louisa Clare Atherton, daughter of Francis Henry Atherton
- Lady Marjory Kennedy (4 September 1898 – 7 December 1988), who married Sir Laurence Pierce Brooke Merriam, MC

Lord Ailsa died at his home, Culzean Castle, overlooking the Firth of Clyde, where he was known as one of the foremost floriculturists, on 9 April 1938. Lady Ailsa died on 9 December 1945.

Honorary titles
Preceded by The Earl of Eglinton	Lord Lieutenant of Ayrshire; 1919–1937	Succeeded by Sir Charles Fergusson, Bt
Peerage of the United Kingdom
Preceded by Archibald Kennedy	Marquess of Ailsa; 1870–1938	Succeeded by Archibald Kennedy
