= Clan Boyd =

Lowland Scottish clan

Boyd
- Mac Buideach, Bòid, Bòideach
- Crest: A dexter hand erect and pale having the outer fingers bowed inwards
- Motto: Confido (I trust)

Profile
- Region: Lowlands
- District: Ayrshire
- Plant badge: Laurel leaves
- Boyd no longer has a chief, and is an armigerous clan
- Seat: Kilmarnock
- Historic seat: Dean Castle, Ayrshire
- Last Chief: Alastair Boyd, 7th Baron Kilmarnock
- Died: 19 March 2009
Septs of Boyd
Air, Aird, Assloss, Auchinloss, Ayr, Ayrd, Bankhead, Blair, Bod, Boddagh, Bodha, Boid, Boit, Boite, Borland, Bowie, Boy, Boyd, Boyde, Boydston, Boyed, Boyman, Boyte, Braland, Bribane, Brown, Buidhe, Buie, Burn, Bute, Cassy, Chrystal, Conn, Coon, Coonie, Corshill, Cosh, Crawford, Crystal, Dick, Faerie, Faery, Fairlie, Fairly, Farie, Farnly, Faul, Faulds, Fauls, Fenwick, Foulterton, Fullarton, Fullerton, Fullton, Gammell, Gemmill, George, Gorman, Gurman, Haire, Hare, Harshaw, Langmoore, Lines, Longmuir, Lynn, MacCosh, MacGillabuidhe, MacGiollabuidhe, MacLorg, MacLurg, Moore, Muir, O'Boyd, Osborne, Parris, Pitco, Raeburn, Rayburn, Reburn, Reyburn, Rigg, Riggs, Speirs, Spiers, Spires, Starret, Steen, Stein, Stiret, Tannahill, Tannock, Templeton, Underwood, Vasser, Woodbourne, Woodburn
Clan branches
Boyd Barons of Kilmarnock (current chiefs)
Lords Boyd and Earls of Kilmarnock (historic chiefs)
Boyd of Merton
Boyd of Penkill
Boyd of Pitcon
Boyd of Trochrig
Allied clans
Clan Crawford
Clan Stewart (18th century)
Rival clans
Stewarts of Darnley (15th century)
Clan Montgomery

Clan Boyd is a Scottish clan of the Scottish Lowlands and is recognized as such by the Lord Lyon King of Arms.

== History ==
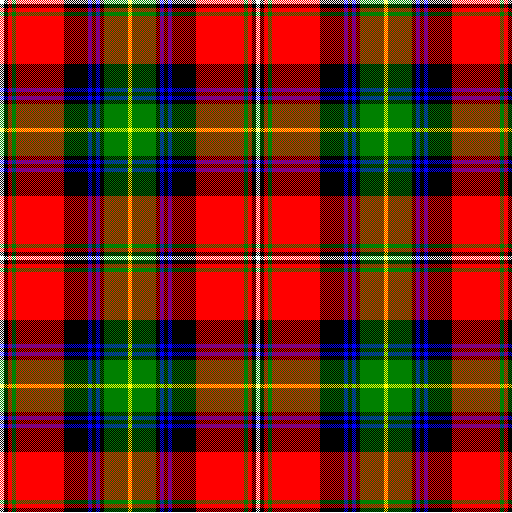
Boyd tartan

=== Origins of the clan ===
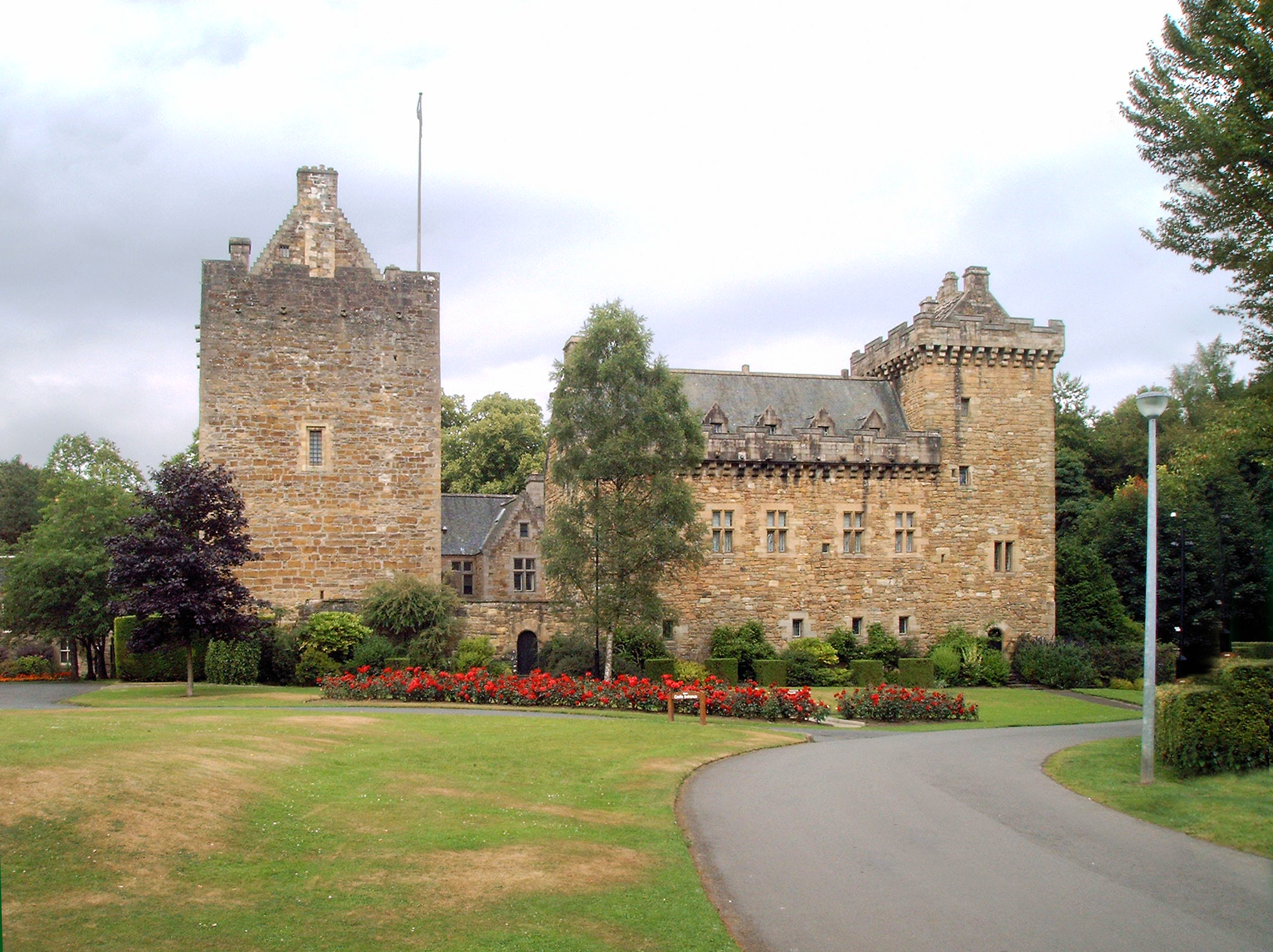
Dean Castle, previously known as Kilmarnock Castle, ancient stronghold of the chiefs of Clan Boyd

The name Boyd is said to be descriptive, being derived from the Scottish Gaelic buidh which means fair or yellow. It could also be the genitive of hailing from the Isle of Bute—Bhoid in Gaelic. The progenitor is said to have been Robert, son of Simon and nephew of Walter fitz Alan, the first High Steward of Scotland. This theory however is challenged by genealogist, William Anderson, who points out that most of the friends and dependents of the High Stewards were of Norman origin and it is therefore unlikely that they would use a Celtic nickname for one of their own family. Anderson believed the name to be of either Norman or Saxon origin. The historian, George Fraser Black, asserts that the first Boyds were vassals of a Norman family, the de Morvilles, for their lands around Largs and Irvine. Black also states that the surname Boyd may be derived from the Scottish Gaelic for the Isle of Bute which is Bòd. Black gives an example of the Marquess of Bute in Scottish Gaelic being Morair Bhoid. Modern sources give the Isle of Bute in Scottish Gaelic as Eilean Bhòid.

In 1205 Robert de Boyd (or Robertus de Boyd) witnessed a contract between the Lord of Eglinton and the burgh of Irvine. Robert de Boyte is listed on the Ragman Rolls, giving homage to Edward I of England in 1296.

=== Wars of Independence, Norway and England ===
The prominence of the Boyds in early Scottish history began with the Battle of Largs in 1263, when Robert Boyd was given a key assignment to take a detachment of men and clear Vikings from the high ground overlooking the beach—as Robert departed to the north, King Alexander III called out "Confido!" (I trust) and indicated the same with his first two fingers of his right hand raised and thumb crossing the palm—a royal gesture and utterance, that subsequently became the clan motto and symbol according to clan history. The high ground the Boyd detachment took as part of a flanking action at Largs was called Gold Berry Hill. Robert Boyd and his infantry were successful in surprising the detachment of Norsemen and caused them to retreat in such haste and panic it helped lead to the disastrous melee at the beach for King Haakom's men. The name "Gold Berry" was often written beneath the early heraldic family shield for this reason. In the 1290s, the Boyds began their association with another Ayrshire legend, William Wallace, fighting alongside other independence-seeking Scots clans to dislodge the English during the dark days following the death of Alexander III with no clear royal successor. In 1306 Duncan Boyd was executed for supporting the cause of Scottish Independence. During the later years of the Wars of Scottish Independence, Sir Robert Boyd, probable grandson of the Robert Boyd from the Battle of Largs fame, who survived as a trusted commander of William Wallace, was a strong supporter of King Robert the Bruce and was one of the key commanders at the Battle of Bannockburn in 1314. (The clan's Bannockburn Shield, a field of cobalt blue with a red and white checker medieval counting board originated at this time and is one of the relics of Dean Castle) He was rewarded for his gallantry, with lands that had been confiscated off the Balliols, including Kilmarnock, Bodington and other substantial lands in Ayrshire, adding to the ancestral lands earned at Largs a half century before.

=== 15th century and clan conflicts ===
Sir Thomas Boyd, 8th chief of Clan Boyd is recorded as having killed Sir Alan Stewart of Darnley in a feud that was in its third year. Boyd himself was killed in revenge by Alexander Stewart, brother of Alan, on 9 July 1439 at Craignaucht Hill in the parish of Dunlop. Stewart had set upon Boyd in open battle in which Boyd was killed along with many men on either side. Boyd's force consisted of only 100 men, where as Stewart's force consisted of three detachments each of seventy men. Boyd's scout only saw one of the Stewart detachments and so the Boyds were expecting their enemy to be inferior in number. However the battle was joined by the other two Stewart detachments which meant that the Boyds were outnumbered by more than two to one. The battle was so fierce that both sides would retire only to re-counter again at the sound of a trumpet. The battle eventually went in favour of the Stewarts of Darnley, however it did not end the feud as another of the Stewarts was later killed in revenge by the Boyds in the town of Dumbarton.

=== 15th century and royal relations ===
The chief of the clan was raised to the peerage under the title Lord Boyd of Kilmarnock by James II of Scotland. On the death of that king, Robert Boyd, 1st Lord Boyd was appointed as one of the regents to the young James III of Scotland. Boyd's younger brother was appointed as the military tutor to the new king. Lord Boyd was also later appointed as Great Chamberlain while his son, Thomas, was married to Princess Mary, the king's sister and was given the title Earl of Arran. The family's success naturally brought them powerful enemies and those opposed to the Boyds began conspiring against them. In 1469 Lord Boyd along with his son, Thomas, and his brother, Alexander were summoned to appear before the king and Parliament to answer charges made against them. Lord Boyd realizing that he faced death escaped to England, while his brother Alexander was executed. His son, Thomas, the Earl of Arran, had been on state business abroad and upon learning of the reversal of his family's fortunes accepted his exile but was well received in royal courts throughout Europe.

James Boyd, 2nd Lord Boyd, 11th chief of the clan, was killed in a feud with Hugh Montgomerie, 1st Earl of Eglinton in 1484. He was succeeded by his uncle, Alexander Boyd, 3rd Lord Boyd, 12th chief, who was a favourite of James IV of Scotland who made him Bailie and Chamberlain of Kilmarnock.

=== 16th century ===
Alexander's son was Robert Boyd, 4th Lord Boyd who according to historian William Boyd had the estates and honours of Lord Boyd restored to him in 1536 by James V of Scotland. Although according to the Collins Scottish Clan & Family Encyclopedia the estates and honours were restored during the reign of Mary, Queen of Scots. Robert had two children, Robert and Margaret. Margaret married Neil Montgomery of Lainshaw, but the connection between the two families was not friendly and her father Robert Boyd, along with Mowat of Busbie, assassinated Neil Montgomery at Irvine in 1547 in revenge for the death of his cousin, James Boyd, in 1484.

The Boyd family were restored to royal favour when Robert Boyd, a descendant of the first Lord Boyd received confirmation of all the family's estates and honours from Mary, Queen of Scots. After the Queen's escape from Lochleven Castle, Lord Boyd was one of the first to join her and fought for her at the Battle of Langside. He later made many visits to her when she was held captive in England. He died in 1590.

=== 17th century and Civil War ===
During the Wars of the Three Kingdoms the Clan Boyd supported the royalist cause. They were rewarded after the Restoration (1660) when William, Lord Boyd was created Earl of Kilmarnock.

=== 18th century and Jacobite risings ===
The third earl opposed the Jacobite rising of 1715 and commanded a regiment of Ayrshire volunteers for the government. However his son, the fourth earl, did support the Jacobite rising of 1745 and fought for Charles Edward Stuart at the Battle of Culloden in 1746, after he had made him a member of the Privy Council with the rank of general. Boyd was captured at the Battle of Culloden and taken to the Tower of London. He was beheaded on Tower Hill on 18 August 1746. All of the Boyd titles were then forfeited, however his eldest son succeeded through his mother to the title of Earl of Erroll and changed his surname to Hay. (See: James Hay, 15th Earl of Erroll).

=== Modern history ===
The 22nd Earl of Errol died in Kenya in 1941. His daughter was entitled to succeed in the earldom of Erroll and the chiefship of the Clan Hay but was excluded from the barony of Kilmarnock which could only pass to males. Consequently, the brother of the 22nd Earl resumed the surname of Boyd and succeeded to the barony of Kilmarnock.

== Clan Chief ==
Alastair Boyd, 7th Baron Kilmarnock and Chief of Clan Boyd, died 19 March 2009. The barony and the chiefship pass to his brother Dr. Robin Boyd, who has not yet claimed either title.

=== Chiefly arms ===
Quarterly, 1st Azure a fess chequy Argent and Gules (for Boyd), 2nd Argent three inescutcheons Gules (for Hay), 3rd Argent three gillyflowers Gules within a double tressure flory counter flory Vert (for Livingston), 4th Sable a bend between six billets Or (for Callendar).

=== Crest badge ===
The crest badge used by members of House of Boyd contains the motto CONFIDO ("I trust"). The blazon of the crest is A dexter hand erect in pale having the outer fingers bowed inwards. The crest badge is the heraldic property of the chief, though any member of the clan may wear this badge to show allegiance to the chief and family.

== Clan castles ==
- Dean Castle, previously known as Kilmarnock Castle was the seat of the chiefs of Clan Boyd who were Barons, Lords and Earls of Kilmarnock.
- Portencross Castle was given to the Boyds of Kilmarnock by Robert the Bruce.
- Bedlay Castle was built by the Boyds in the sixteenth century but they sold it to the Roberton family in 1642 and it later passed to the Clan Campbell.
- Badenheath Castle was owned by Robert Boyd of Badenheath who supported Queen Mary at the Battle of Langside in 1568 but the castle passed to the Coupers in the later 17th century and was completely demolished in 1953.
- Brodick Castle was held by the Boyds when they were Earls of Arran from 1467 to 1469. It is now owned by the National Trust for Scotland and is open to the public.
- Callendar House was originally a property of the Livingstones but in 1715 it was leased by William Boyd, 4th Earl of Kilmarnock. After the earl was executed for treason the property went to the Clan Forbes and is now open to the public, standing in a public park.
- Law Castle in the north-east of West Kilbride in Ayrshire was long held by the Clan Boyd but was sold to the Bonties in 1670.
- Little Cumbrae Castle
- Penkill Castle was long held by the Boyds but went to William Bell Scott who restored it in 1857.
- Pitcon Castle near Dalry in Ayrshire was originally held by the Pitcon family and then by the Boyds until they sold it to the MacRaes in the 1770s.
- Trabboch Castle was held by the Boyds in the 14th century until about 1450 when it passed to the Clan Douglas and then to the Clan Boswell. Another source states that the castle was forfeited by the Boyds to the Crown following their fall from royal favour in 1469.
