= Lord Boyd =

Lord Boyd may refer to:

- Lord Boyd of Kilmarnock, title in the Scottish peerage between 1454 and 1746
  - Robert Boyd, 1st Lord Boyd (died 1482)
  - James Boyd, 2nd Lord Boyd (c. 1469–1484)
  - Alexander Boyd, 3rd Lord Boyd (died after 1508)
  - Robert Boyd, 4th Lord Boyd (died 1557 or 1558)
  - Robert Boyd, 5th Lord Boyd (c. 1517–1590)
  - Thomas Boyd, 6th Lord Boyd (c. 1547–1611)
  - Robert Boyd, 7th Lord Boyd (1595–1628)
  - Robert Boyd, 8th Lord Boyd (c. 1618–1640)
  - James Boyd, 9th Lord Boyd (died 1654)
- Colin Boyd, Baron Boyd of Duncansby (born 1953), former Lord Advocate for Scotland

== See also ==
- Alan Lennox-Boyd, 1st Viscount Boyd of Merton (1904-1983), British Conservative politician.
- Lord Boyd-Carpenter (1908-1998), British Conservative politician.
- Lord Boyd-Orr (1880-1971), Scottish teacher, doctor, biologist and politician who received the Nobel Peace Prize.
