= James Stewart, Earl of Moray =

Illegitimate son of James IV of Scotland

James Stewart, Earl of Moray (c. 1500–1544) was a Scottish nobleman and diplomat.

He was the illegitimate son of James IV of Scotland and his mistress Janet Kennedy. He became Earl of Moray in 1501. His upbringing included a period at Stirling Castle, in the care of Andrew Aytoun, and then he and his mother were moved to Darnaway Castle. Like his elder half-brother Alexander Stewart, he was sent to the Continent to study under the humanist scholar Erasmus. He was young enough to avoid fighting at the disastrous Battle of Flodden in 1513.

He should not be confused with the two later and better-known 16th-century Earls of Moray who were also called James Stewart: his nephew James Stewart, 1st Earl of Moray, who was Regent during the minority of James VI, and this nephew's son-in-law James Stewart, 2nd Earl of Moray, who was The Bonny Earl of Murray of the famous ballad.

According to John Lesley, in 1526 Moray protected the young heir of Lachlan Mackintosh of Dunnachtan or Dunachton, his nephew, from his half-brothers Hector and William, who came to Dyke by Darnaway and burnt the countryside and killed several people, and captured Petty Castle belonging to Ogilvy of Durne or Durness. Moray got a commission from James V to raise an army and attack the Mackintosh brothers. Hector Mackintosh was brought back to Forres and beheaded, William Mackintosh was pardoned but murdered soon after in St Andrews. The young Mackintosh heir was brought up by Moray and the Laird of Findlater.

Moray had a varied relationship with his half-brother James V, and was imprisoned for a time. In February 1531, James V gave him a commission to negotiate with rebels in the Scottish Isles and offer them pardons for future obedience.

Moray went to France and was invested in the Order of Saint Michael by the Duke of Vendôme. In April 1536 Francis I of France arranged that James V would marry the Duke of Vendôme's daughter, Mary of Bourbon. Francis sent a courtier, Guillaume d'Yzernay, to the Earl of Moray with the collar and insignia of the Order of Saint Michael to give to James V as a token of his affection and their family union. Moray was instructed to present the collar with the same ceremonies that the Duke had observed at his investiture into the order.

The 16th-century historian John Lesley, Bishop of Ross praised Moray for his diplomatic skills. In 1543 the Earl arranged the accidental destruction of valuable Venetian glass at a banquet to impress Peter Francisco Contarini, Patriarch of Venice, producing another set of glasses after the first was cleared away. Mary's secretary Claude Nau also recorded a version of this story.

He had homes in Edinburgh, Balnageith near Forres, Elgin and Darnaway Castle. He wrote a will in June 1540, when he was planning to travel to France for the sake of his health. He was involved in keeping Tantallon Castle in 1542 and was paid £100 Scots for his expenses.

== Family ==
James Stewart married Lady Elizabeth Campbell, daughter of Colin Campbell, 3rd Earl of Argyll and Lady Jean Gordon, in August 1529. They had one daughter, Lady Mary Stewart, who married John Stewart, Master of Buchan. She obtained a divorce on 12 September 1560 and died childless.

His widow, Elizabeth Campbell, Countess of Moray, later married John Gordon, 11th Earl of Sutherland, and died around 1548.

James had an illegitimate son, also called James Stewart, with Marion Stewart, as well as a daughter, Elizabeth Stewart.

== Ancestors ==
Ancestors of James Stewart, Earl of Moray

8. James II of Scotland
4. James III of Scotland
9. Mary of Guelders
2. James IV of Scotland
10. Christian I of Denmark
5. Margaret of Denmark
11. Dorothea of Brandenburg
1. James Stewart, Earl of Moray
12. Gilbert Kennedy, 1st Lord Kennedy
6. John Kennedy, 2nd Lord Kennedy
13. Catherine Maxwell
3. Janet Kennedy
14. Alexander Gordon, 1st Earl of Huntly
7. Lady Elizabeth Gordon
15. Elizabeth Crichton
