= Thomas Boyd, Earl of Arran =

15th-century Scottish nobleman

Thomas Boyd, Earl of Arran (died c. 1473) was a Scottish nobleman.

Thomas was the son of Robert, 1st Lord Boyd, who was a regent during the minority of King James III of Scotland. His father was able to have Thomas created Earl of Arran and Baron Kilmarnock in the Peerage of Scotland, and arrange for Thomas' marriage to Princess Mary Stewart of Scotland, sister of King James III and daughter of King James II of Scotland, in 1467. The marriage was unpopular, especially after Lord Boyd and his brother, Sir Alexander Boyd, were later convicted of treason for abducting young James III, contriving the marriage of Thomas to Princess Mary Stewart (which was considered as an unforgivable insult by King James III), and establishing the regency.

While Thomas Boyd and his father were out of the country, negotiating the cession of Orkney to Scotland and King James III's marriage to Margaret of Denmark, the regency was overthrown, and they were attainted for high treason in 1469. However, Thomas fulfilled his mission, that of bringing the King's bride Margaret to Scotland, and then warned by his wife, he escaped with her back to Denmark. He is mentioned very eulogistically in one of the Paston Letters, but practically nothing is known of his subsequent history. He probably died at Antwerp between 1471 and 1473.

== Family ==
On 20 January 1465, Thomas Boyd was firstly engaged to Lady Marion Kennedy, youngest daughter of Gilbert Kennedy, 1st Lord Kennedy, but this marriage did not take place. After his first marriage to Lady Elizabeth Montgomerie, daughter of Alexander Montgomerie, 1st Lord Montgomerie, he married Princess Mary Stewart, eldest daughter of King James II, before 26 April 1467. Upon their marriage, the Isle of Arran was given to them as Mary's dowry, and Law Castle in North Ayrshire was built for the couple.

Being greatly attached to Thomas, his wife Mary later returned to Scotland without him, after he was charged for treason, mainly in hopes of obtaining a pardon for Thomas from her brother King James III. She was however confined at Kilmarnock, and Thomas was summoned to appear within sixty days, which he failed to do so; thus, his marriage to the King's sister was declared null and void, and she was then compelled to marry James, Lord Hamilton.

According to Ferrerius, Buchanan, and other old historians, this took place in 1469, but the correct date was probably February or March 1474. Princess Mary Stewart died apparently about Whitsuntide 1488, having had a son and daughter by both husbands. Thomas Boyd's children by Mary, who were both said to have been born abroad, were:

- James, 2nd Lord Boyd (1469–1484) killed by Elizabeth Montgomerie's nephew Hugh Montgomerie, 1st Earl of Eglinton; died unmarried.
- Lady Grisel or Margaret Boyd (she is called Grizel in the genealogies, but appears as Margaret in the Registers of the Great Seal, and in the Papal Dispensation, etc.). She was born between 1468 and 1473, and was married twice: first, to Alexander Forbes, 4th Lord Forbes, who died without issue before 16 May 1491; and secondly, before 9 August 1509, as the second wife to Sir David Kennedy, 3rd Lord Kennedy, then created Earl of Cassillis, who died without issue by her at Flodden on 9 September 1513. By her marriage to Sir David Kennedy, she had no descendants.

== Notes ==
Peerage of Scotland
New creation	Earl of Arran; 1467–1472	Forfeit
