= Mary Stewart, Countess of Arran =

Mary Stewart
- Countess of Arran; Lady Hamilton
- Born: before May 1452; Stirling Castle, Scotland
- Died: May 1488 (aged 35)
- Spouses: Thomas Boyd, 1st Earl of Arran; James Hamilton, 1st Lord Hamilton
- Issue: Margaret Boyd; James Boyd, 2nd Lord Boyd of Kilmarnock; James Hamilton, 1st Earl of Arran; Elizabeth Hamilton, Countess of Lennox
- House: House of Stewart
- Father: James II of Scotland
- Mother: Mary of Guelders

Mary Stewart, Countess of Arran (before May 1452 – ca. May 1488) was the elder daughter of King James II of Scotland and Mary of Guelders. King James III of Scotland was her eldest brother. She married twice: firstly, to Thomas Boyd, 1st Earl of Arran; secondly, to James Hamilton, 1st Lord Hamilton. It was through her children by her second husband that the Hamilton earls of Arran and the Stewart earls of Lennox derived their claim to the Kingdom of Scotland.

== Family ==
Mary was born at Stirling Castle shortly before May 1452, the eldest daughter of James II of Scotland and Mary of Guelders. The exact date of her birth is unknown, but it would have been before May 1452, which is the first time she is mentioned in a payment of her expenses at Falkland in May on a journey from Stirling to St. Andrews. She had five siblings, including James III, who ascended the Scottish throne in 1460 upon their father's accidental death by an exploding cannon. Mary's mother died in 1463, leaving her an orphan at the age of ten.

== Marriages and issue ==
Mary was married to her first husband, Thomas Boyd, Earl of Arran, when she was 13 years old before 26 April 1467. The Isle of Arran was given as her dowry upon her marriage. Law Castle in North Ayrshire was built for the couple.

In 1467, Mary's husband Thomas was sent to Denmark to escort King James III's bride, Margaret of Denmark. During his absence, Mary's brother, the King, became alienated from Mary's husband by the enemies of the Clan Boyd who brought false charges of treason against Thomas and his father, Robert Boyd, 1st Lord Boyd. Mary, upon hearing that her husband was to be summoned before the king and Parliament to answer the charges, immediately went to the harbour of Leith when Thomas' ship docked in July, to forewarn him. Mary and Thomas then promptly sailed to Denmark.

On 22 November 1469, Mary's husband was attainted, and his title, honours, and estates were forfeited to the crown. She later returned to Scotland in an attempt to have her husband cleared of all charges laid against him. Upon her arrival in Scotland, her brother James detained her in custody at Dean Castle in Kilmarnock, until her marriage was annulled. Mary's marriage to Thomas was then declared void in 1473, and she was forced to marry James Hamilton, 1st Lord Hamilton.

Thomas and Mary together had two children:

- Lady Margaret Boyd (1468–1533), married, firstly, Alexander Forbes, 4th Lord Forbes; secondly, Sir David Kennedy, 1st Earl of Cassilis. Although she was married twice, neither marriage produced children.
- James Boyd, 2nd Lord Boyd of Kilmarnock (1469–1484), died unmarried. He was killed at the age of 15 by Lord Montgomerie, which ignited a feud that lasted for over 70 years.

In early 1474, Mary married, as her second husband, James Hamilton, 1st Lord Hamilton, who was almost forty years her senior. They received a papal dispensation on 26 April 1476 thus legitimising the two children already born to them. Together, James and Mary had two children:

- Hon. Elizabeth Hamilton (died after April 1531), married, on 9 April 1494, Matthew Stewart, 2nd Earl of Lennox, by whom she had issue. The Stewarts of Lennox, of whom Henry Stuart, Lord Darnley, the second husband of Mary, Queen of Scots, was the most notable, derived their claim to the Scottish throne from Elizabeth's son John Stewart, 3rd Earl of Lennox.
- James Hamilton, 1st Earl of Arran (1475–1529), married, firstly, in 1490, Elizabeth Home by whom he had two daughters; he divorced Elizabeth in 1504. He married, secondly, in 1516, Janet Bethune, daughter of Sir David Bethune, 1st of Creich and Janet Duddlingston, by whom he had three children including his heir, James Hamilton, Duke of Châtellerault, 2nd Earl of Arran (c. 1516 – 22 January 1575), heir presumptive to the Kingdom of Scotland (2 July 1536 – 22 May 1540), (April 1541– 8 December 1542), (14 December 1542 – 19 June 1566), and (29 July 1567 – 22 January 1575); Regent of Scotland (1542–1554).

== Death and legacy ==
Mary died in May 1488 at the age of 35.

Due to their proximity to the throne, Mary's descendants, the Hamiltons of Arran and the Stewarts of Lennox, would obtain considerable power, and play conspicuous roles in 16th-century Scottish politics; especially affecting the life and reign of Mary, Queen of Scots, the great-granddaughter of her brother, James III.

== External Sources ==
- Armstrong, C.A.J. (ed). A Letter of James III to the Duke of Burgundy. Miscellany of the Scottish Historical Society, 3rd series (1953), vol. 43, pp. 19-32.
- Brown, P. H. (1908). A Short History of Scotland. United Kingdom: Oliver and Boyd. pp. 251-254.
