= Robert Boyd, 4th Lord Boyd =

Scottish nobleman

Robert Boyd, 4th Lord Boyd (c. 1485 – 3 January 1558) was a Scottish nobleman who supported various factions attempting to dominate Scottish politics during the reign of King James V and the minority of Mary, Queen of Scots. (Note: Balfour 1904, p. 155 Notes that Considerable confusion exists as to the numbering of the Lords Boyd. In the Complete Peerage Balfour's Robert, 5th Lord Boyd is considered the 3rd Lord, though in the Dictionary National Bibliography (Rigg 1886, pp. 96, 97), as in Douglas, "he is, for some cause, called the fourth Lord, though, if the attainder is not reckoned (whereby three persons, viz. (1) the Earl of Arran (living 1472); (2) James Boyd (died 1484), son and heir of the Earl of Arran; and (3) Alexander Boyd (living 1505), uncle and heir of the said James, were excluded from the succession), he would apparently have been sixth Lord", (Douglas see p. 399, note 6). Balfour states that it is now known that the Earl of Arran died v.p., and that James was restored as Lord Boyd in 1482, therefore this Robert was apparently de facto fourth Lord. As, however, there is some doubt on the point, the present writer has determined to reckon them as if each head of the family since the original creation of 1454 had actually succeeded to the Peerage, as indeed but for the attainder of 1469 they would have done. Cokayne writing a decade after agreed with Balfour's numbering (Cokayne 1912, p. 160), as does Hewitt the author of the 21st-century article "Boyd, Robert, fifth Lord Boyd (c. 1517–1590)" in the Oxford Dictionary of National Biography (Hewitt 2004).)

== Biography ==
Robert Boyd was the son of Alexander, 3rd Lord Boyd.

Robert Boyd is first mentioned in connection with a feud with the Montgomeries, in which Patrick Montgomerie of Irvine was slain in December 1523. This appears to have been in revenge for the murder of James, 2nd Lord Boyd, in 1484, and the feud continued more or less until 2 May 1530, when Hugh Montgomerie, 1st Earl of Eglinton, proposed a settlement. The parties agreed in Glasgow that Boyd should accept 2,000 merks for the killing of James, and should marry his son and heir to one of the Earl's "oos" [house].

On 24 June 1525 he had a discharge from Archibald, Earl of Angus, for the "fermes" of Kilmarnock pertaining to his spouse, Margaret the Queen Mother, and another from Margaret herself, dated 27 November 1529, having been appointed a Squire of the Household on 26 June 1525. Among the Boyd papers is a bond of mutual assistance dated 26 May 1529 between this Robert Boyd and Margaret the Queen Mother and Henry, Lord Methven, her third husband.

On 13 June 1532 Robert Boyd's son, also called Robert, was granted a nine years' lease on the lands of Kilmarnock from Margaret. Robert Boyd had succeeded his father Alexander as Bailie and Chamberlain of Kilmarnock, and resigned that position on 5 May 1534, when his son was appointed in his place. Henceforth "Robert senior" appears as "formerly in Kilmarnock" and under this designation he and Helen Somerville, his spouse, had a grant of the lands of Dundonald in Walters-kyle in exchange for lands in Cunyngham on 20 May 1536; under the same description they had a further grant, dated 13 August 1536, of the lands of Chapelton, etc., in the lordship of Stewartoun, in recompense for their renunciation of all their claims and rights to the lands and barony of Kilmarnock. For services in France and elsewhere, he and his wife had a new grant of the said lands "and of the lands and castle of Dundonald" on 1 June 1537.

In 1543 Robert Boyd protested against the reduction of the forfeiture of Sir James Colville of East Wemyss, and early the next year he rendered material assistance to the Regent James Hamilton, 2nd Earl of Arran, against the faction supporting Matthew Stewart, 4th Earl of Lennox, at the Battle of Glasgow. It was doubtless in reward for this help at a critical juncture of the battle that he was ultimately restored as Lord Boyd. The date of this is generally given as 1549, when he is said to have been confirmed by a charter of novodamus in all the estates, honours, and dignities that belonged to his grandfather (Robert Boyd, 1st Lord Boyd). The precise date of this charter, which is not recorded in the Register of the Great Seal, is not given, but the actual date of the restoration of the title was between 22 September 1545 and 17 November 1546. The property, however, was probably restored in 1543, as on 29 October that year he had a letter from the dowager queen, Mary of Guise, discharging the execution of any letters at the instance of the Master of Glencairn, charging the said Robert Boyd or "any otheris withholderis of the castle of Kilmarnock to deliver the same to him or any of his servants", and on 11 March 1545 he was served heir to James Boyd, the son of his father's elder brother, in the lands of Kilmarnock, Dairy, Kilbride, etc., being thus acknowledged as head of the family.

Robert Boyd of Kilmarnock was one of those who pledged to defend the country against the English in the Parliament held at Stirling on 26 June 1545. Robert Boyd, son and heir-apparent of Robert Boyd of Kilmarnock, had sasine on precept (a legal instrument giving him feudal tenure) dated 22 September 1545 by the dowager queen Mary, following the resignation of his father. Robert, Lord Boyd of Kilmarnock and Robert, Master of Boyd, his son, witnessed a contract between the Countess of Eglinton and Montgomerie of Langschaw on 17 November 1546 (see also The Lands of Lainshaw).

Robert Boyd was present at the meeting of the Privy Council at St. Andrews on 19 December 1546. Notwithstanding the agreement of 1530, the feud with the Montgomeries still continued, and Sir Neil Montgomerie of Lainshaw was slain by Lord Boyd and his adherents in a skirmish in the streets of Irvine in 1547. This was warmly resented, and the feud raged until 1560–61, when, in the time of his son the 5th Lord Boyd, peace was restored between the parties by a mutual compromise. Robert, 4th Lord Boyd, died between 29 July 1557, when his son is styled Master of Boyd, and 10 May 1558, when the son is "now Lord Boyd".

== Family ==
Robert Boyd married Helen, daughter of Sir John Somerville of Cambusnethan, before 1518. She was living on 13 August 1536. He married, secondly, before December 1542, Elizabeth Napier, widow of Humphrey Colquhoun of Luss, and thirdly, before February 1549, Marion, daughter of Sir John Colquhoun of Luss. She survived him, and was married, secondly, to Captain Thomas Crawfurd of Jordanhill. He had two children:

1. Robert, 5th Lord Boyd (c. 1517–1590)
2. Margaret, who married John Montgomerie of Lainshaw and was widowed before 10 February 1560–61.

== Notes ==
Footnotes

Citations

Peerage of Scotland
Preceded by Alexander Boyd	Lord Boyd; 1547 (confirmed by a charter) – 1557 or 1558	Succeeded by Robert Boyd
