= Clan Muir =

Scottish clan

- Mhor, Mór, Mordha
- Crest: A savage head couped Proper.
- Motto: Durum patientia frango (I overcome difficulty by patience)
- War cry: Conlan Abu

Profile
- Region: Lowlands Dumfries and Galloway Scottish Border Isles of OrkneyHighlands
- District: East Ayrshire, East Renfrewshire Aberdeenshire Roxburghshire Wigtownshire Kirkcudbrightshire; Berwickshire; Lanarkshire
- Plant badge: Rowan tree
- Clan Muir no longer has a chief, and is an armigerous clan
- Historic seat: Rowallan Castle
- Last Chief: The Mure of Rowallan
Septs of Clan Muir
Muir, Mure, More, Moar, Moare, Moer, Moir, Moire, Moor, Moore, Moure, Mur, Myre, Morey, Mordha, O' Mordha, O' Moore, O' More, Caldwell, Mor, Mohr, Myre, Myres, Morey, de Mora, Langmuir, Langmuir, Delamore, de la More, Ó'Mothair, Moher, Byre
Clan branches
Mure of Polkelly
Mure of Rowallan
Mure of Caldwell
Mure of Skaithmuir
Mure of Limflare
Mure of Lowdown hill
Mure of Abercorn
Mure of Auchindraine
Mure of Cowdams
Mure of Camseskane
Mure of Skemore
Mure of Kittiemore
Mure of Gladerstone
Mure of Cassencarie
Moir of Leckie
Moir of Invernettie
Moir of Stoneywood
Mure of Aucheneil
Mure of Thornton
Mure of Treescraig
Mure of Cloncaird
Mure of Craighead Park
Mure of Middleston
Mure of Spittleside
Mure of Brownhill
Muir of Sanday
Muir of Clat
Muir of Brugh
Muir of Lemsgarth
Muir of Brusgrath
Allied clans
Clan Kennedy of Bargany
Clan Boyd
Clan Montgomery
Clan Douglas
Clan Gordon
Clan Leslie
Clan Campbell
Clan Wallace
Rival clans
Clan Kennedy
Clan Cunningham,
Clan Boyd (16th century)
Clan Crawford
Clan Sempill
Clan Maxwell of Pollock
Clan Ralston
Clan Houston
Clan Cumming
Clan Ryburn of that Ilk
Clan Reid of Kittochside
Clan McCulloch
Clan MacLellan

Clan Muir is a Scottish clan that is armigerous. Per certain sources, holders of the surname Muir (also appearing as Mure and Moore), of Ayrshire, have been noted as a possible sept of Clan Boyd, though this is not clearly identified to a reliable resource. A spelling variation More/Moore is a sept of Clan Leslie in Aberdeenshire, and, having genetic proof of Muirs in Aberdeenshire, may have roots in the Mure/Muir line of southwest Scotland.

However, there are other instances in which links to the Mure/Muir line of southwest Scotland cannot be confirmed. The surname Moir, for example, is a sept of Clan Gordon in the highlands, but is not part of this same group of Mure/Muir/Moore. A single family, the Mores/Moores of Drumcork, are septs of Clan Grant, but there is no evidence of a connection to the Mure/Muir line. Some also project Muir may be a sept of Clan Campbell, though even Clan Campbell considers this unlikely.

== Origins and history ==
The Scottish surname Muir supposedly originated as denoting someone who lived beside a moor. The name is derived from the Scots form of the Middle English more, meaning "moor" or "fen".

== Earliest documented with the surname ==
The first Mor/de Mor/de la Mor/Mure/Muir with solid documentation to Ayr, Scotland, is David de More. "The most ancient of the name on record are the Mores of Polkelly, near Kilmarnock; one of whom, David de More, appears as witness to a charter of Alexander II", between 1214 and 1249.

After David, the next most distant person found is Sir Gilchrist Mure/Muir (ca. 1200 - ca. 1280), in association with his part in the Battle of Largs, on 2 October 1263. Given the naming tradition, and locality (Ayr), it appears at least three descendants of his (Adam, Gilchrist, and Reginald/Ronald, all listed as "counte de Are/Ayr") appear in the Ragman Rolls, thirty-three years later. There were also three others with the surname listed, namely, Reynaud More de Cragg, del counte de Lanark, Symon de la More, de Thaugarfton, del counte de Lanark, and Douenal le fiz Michel More de Leuenghes, del counte de Dunbreton.

In 1291, a Thomas de la More was listed as executor of the Will of Dervorguilla de Balliol, mother of John Balliol, King of Scots.

Further, an Adam de la More, along with William de la More, were recorded as jurors on the lands of Lady Elena la Zuche, in Coyningham (Cunningham), in 1295. It seems likely that Adam was also one-in-the-same as holding lands in Ralston, Renfrewshire, in 1315 and 1321, and as the knight-possibly the same as the Adam who witnessed the charters of Robert the Bruce, King of Scots, between 1328 and 1329.

=== Mures of Rowallan ===
Polkelly seems to have been the "ancient" property held in Scotland by the Mures.

The Mures were prominent figures throughout the history of Scotland, from Sir Gilchrist Mure, who married the daughter and sole heir of Sir Walter Comyn with the blessing of King Alexander III, for his part in the Battle of Largs. This secured the family seat at Rowallan Castle. Another version states that Gilchrist Mure was dispossessed of the house and living at Rowallan by the strong hand of Sir Walter Cuming, and was compelled to keep close in his castle of Polkelly until Alexander III raised sufficient forces to subdue Cuming and his adherents. The family had held Rowallan, in this version, from unknown antiquity. This version, however, is unlikely, since Sir Walter Comyn is believed to have died at least five years before the Battle of Largs.

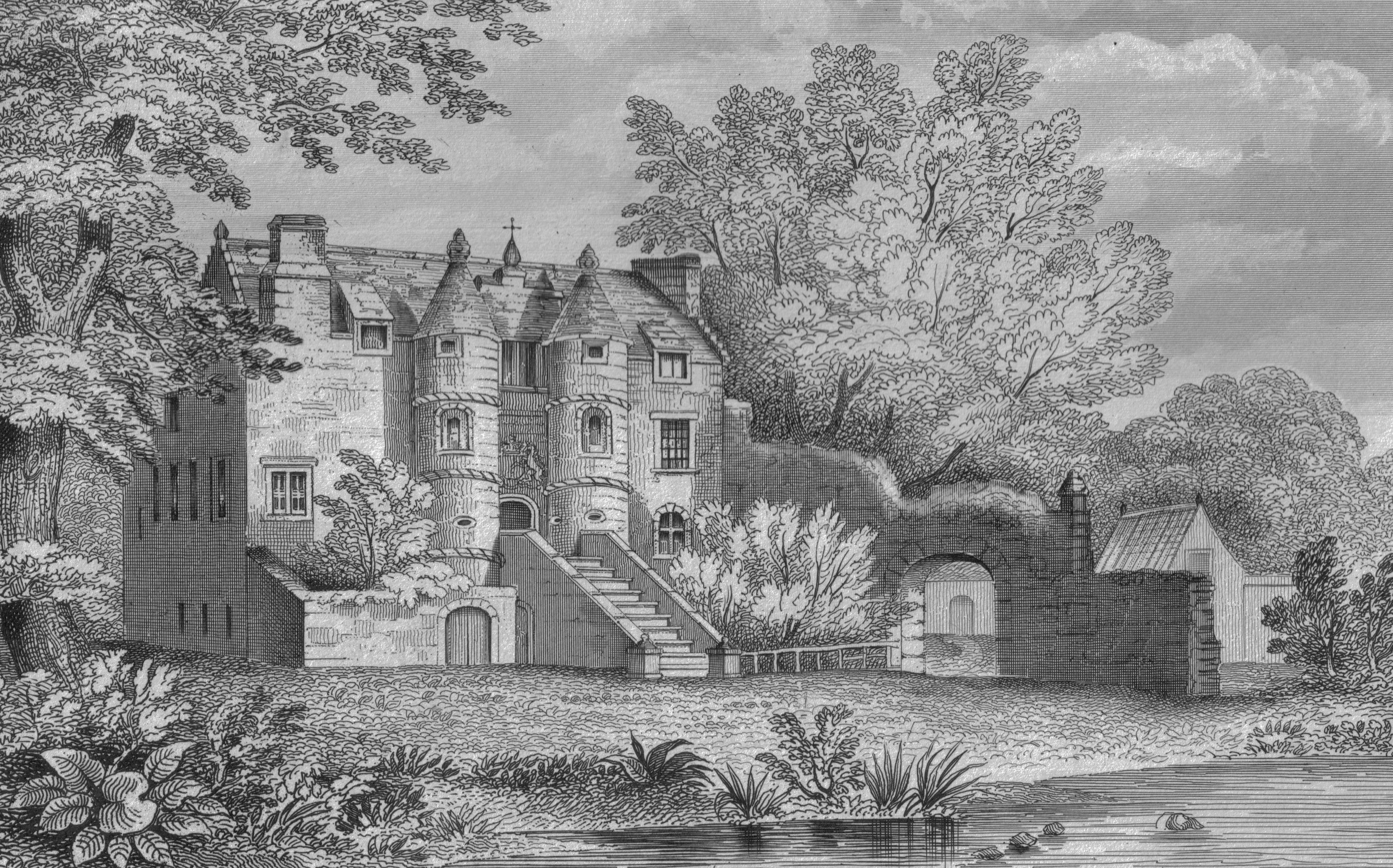
Rowallan Castle in 1876.

The conjoined arms of the first Mure of Rowallan were visible on the oldest part of the castle up until the 18th century.

Elizabeth Mure, daughter of Sir Adam Mure of Rowallan and Janet Mure, married Robert Stewart, later King Robert II of Scotland, and bore him nine children before 22 November 1347, when their marriage was legitimized by papal dispensation. Elizabeth died sometime before 1355. The marriage of Robert and Elizabeth's daughter, Jean, to John Lyon, created the title Thane of Glamis. Descendants from that line are traceable to King Charles III.

Sir Gilchrist Muir built two chapels, one at the Well named for Saint Laurence and the other at Banked named for Saint Michael. The vestiges of these were still visible in 1876. He also built the chapel of Kilmarnock, commonly called Mures Isle (or aisle).

A number of Mure heirs participated in a range of battles for Scotland, including Sir Robert Mure, who may have been among the slain at the Battle of Sark, in October 1448. His namesake was called the Rud of Rowallane, being large in stature, very strong and prone to pugilism; these characteristics neatly define the meaning of this archaic Scots word. He wasted his inheritance and during his lifetime a protracted feud took place with the house of Ardoch (Craufurdland) which resulted in much bloodshed. The 'Rud' resigned his lands in favour of his grandson John, who married Margaret Boyd a mistress of James IV.

Sir Mungo Mure, credited with significant improvements to Rowallan, was killed in the Battle of Pinkie, in September 1547.

Sir William Mure, (1594-1657), was also Laird of Rowallan, and was known for his contributions as a writer, politician, and a military leader, being wounded at the battle of Marston Moor, in 1644. Among his descendants were Dr. John Moore, and his sons, including Lt. Gen. Sir John Moore, Admiral Sir Graham Moore, and Dr. James Carrick Moore.

==== Campbells, later Lairds of Rowallan ====
Sir William Mure was the sixteenth and last Mure of Rowallan. He served in Germany under Gustavus Adolphus. One of his granddaughters married Sir James Campbell of Lawers, third son of the Earl of Loudoun, who thus became Laird of Rowallan. His son, Major-General James Mure Campbell of Rowallan (1726–86), became the fifth Earl of Loudoun in 1782. His only daughter's great-grandson, Charles Rawdon-Hastings, 11th Earl of Loudoun succeeded in 1874 and held the lands of Rowallan as Laird.

==== Cadet branches ====
Sir Adam Mure's three younger brothers gave rise to numerous branches of the Mure family who settled in Caldwell, Aucheneil, Thornton, Glanderstoun, Treescraig, Auchendrane, Cloncaird, Craighead Park, Middleston, Spittleside and Brownhill.

The Mure of Rowallan coat of arms. ARMS Quarterly, 1st & 4th, Argent, on a fess Azure three stars of the First (Muir); 2nd & 3rd, Azure, three garbs Or (Cumming) CREST A savage head couped Proper MOTTO Durum patientia frango SUPPORTERS Two blackamoors Proper.

== Clan Muir Roll of Arms and Clan Branches ==
The Mure of Rowallan

Arms of James Muir, Parson of Philorth

Arms of Mure of Riccarton

Muir of Cassencary

Arms of Mure of Caldwell

Arms of James Mure, London

Arms of Muir of Ardenvohr

Arms of Muir Baronets of Deanston, Lord Provost of Glasgow.

Arms of Sir William Muir

=== Clan motto ===
"Durum Patientia Frango" (By patience I break what is hard).

Curiously, this is very close to the motto attributed to the Mure line of Caldwell, Renfrewshire, which is "Duris non frangor". Though the Mure line of Caldwell descends from the Mures of Rowallan, there is actually no motto listed for the Mures of Rowallan.

=== Clan Tartan ===
The Muir tartan is registered as the "Muir/Moore tartan" under the category Clan/Family, with no mention of it being associated with a "clan". It has the traditional blue - black - green base, but with an unusual motif of three narrow red stripes appearing twice on the green square. A similar device is seen in the Cochrane tartan. The threadcount of this illustration comes from a sample in the collection of John MacGregor Hastie, who collected tartans between 1930 and 1950, and whose work formed the basis of the archive at the Scottish Tartans Society. The tartan was documented in John Ross's, Land of the Scottish Gael (1930). Samples in Scottish Tartans Authority Dalgety Collection. Per the Scottish Register of Tartans (2009), the date of this tartan is 1 January 1880.

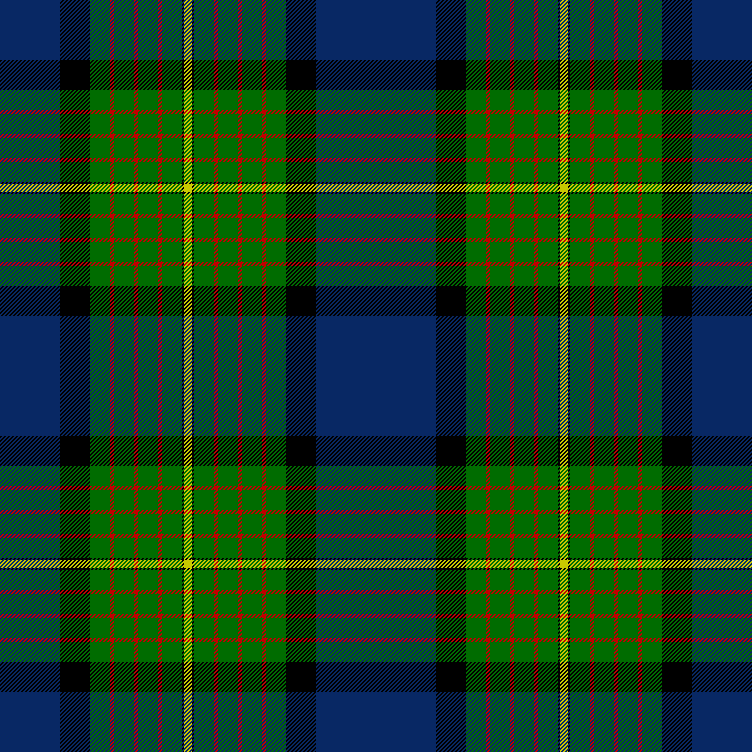
The tartan associated with the name Muir was documented in John Ross's, Land of the Scottish Gael published in 1930.

== Associated names ==
Clan Muir does not have any septs, though common variations of the name Muir or Moore are associated with the clan. Muir/More/Moore/Mure are most prevalent in Ayrshire and areas in the Southwest lowlands, though branches had spread to Eastern Scotland as early as the 15th century.

=== Clan affiliation by spelling variation ===
- Muir/Mure/Moore - more common in Clan Campbell
- Moir/Moire - more common in Clan Gordon
- Moore - more common in Clan Leslie
- Moore/More - more common in Clan Grant

== Clan membership ==
Clan membership is determined by surname. According to Sir Crispin Agnew of Lochnaw, if a person has a particular sept name which can be attributed to a number of clans, either they should determine from which part of Scotland their family originally came from and owe allegiance to the clan of that area or, alternatively, if they do not know where they came from, they should owe allegiance to the clan to which their family had traditionally owed allegiance. Alternatively, they may offer allegiance to any of the particular named clans in the hope that the Chief will accept them as a member of his clan. Thus if a person offers his allegiance to a particular Chief by joining his clan society or by wearing his tartan, he can be deemed to have elected to join that particular clan and should be viewed as a member of that clan. Members of Clan Muir who do not give their allegiance to any of the clans that list their surname as a sept or who do not have a family history of belonging to any of the aforementioned clans wear the Muir tartan.

== See also ==
- Armigerous clan
- Clan Boyd
- Clan Campbell
- Clan Gordon
- Clan Grant
- Clan Leslie
- Clan Muir
- House of Windsor
