= Polkelly Castle =

- Fenwick, East Ayrshire, Scotland; UK grid reference NS45684524
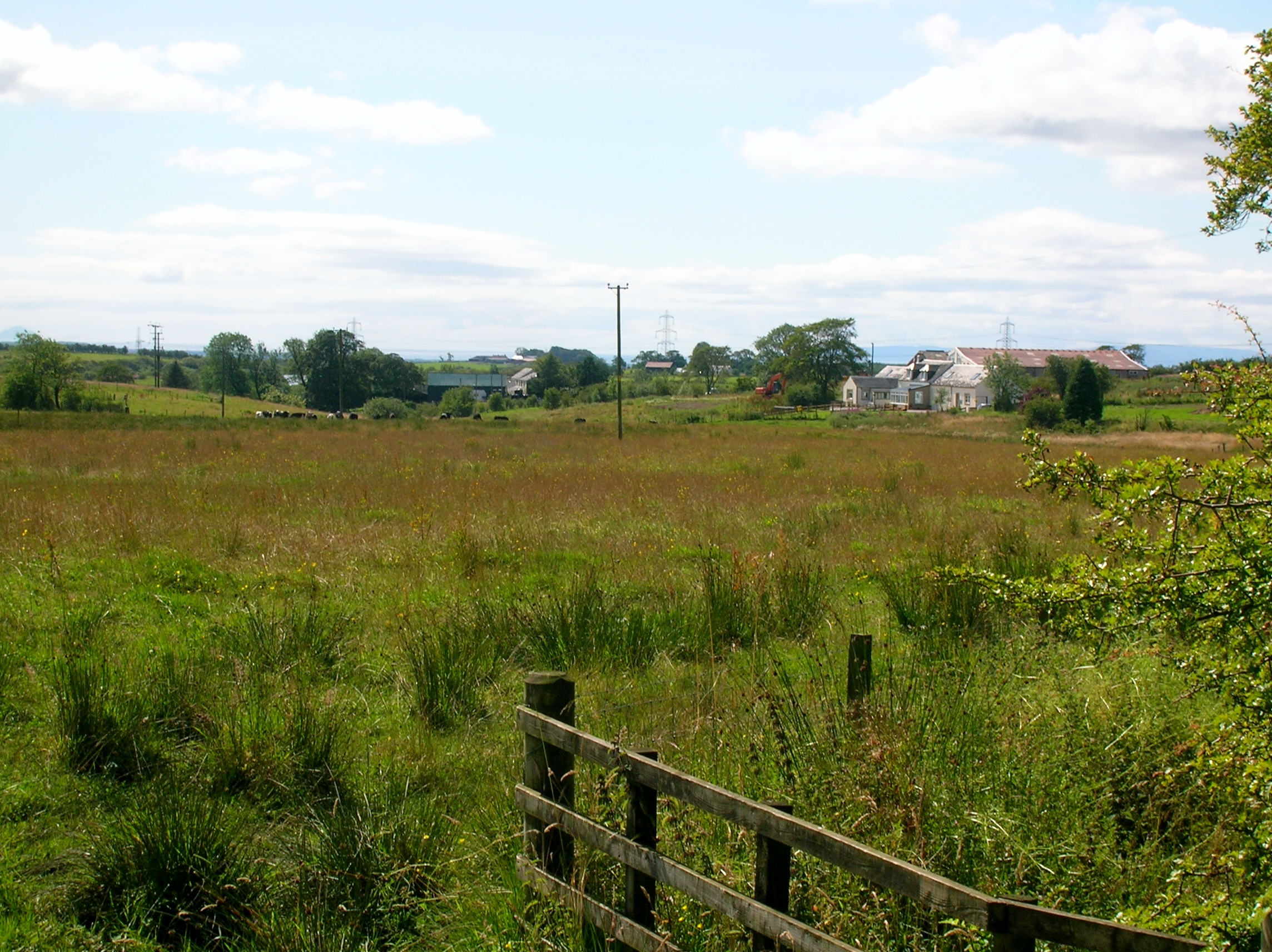
- Pokelly Hall and Balgray Mill

Site information
- Owner: Private
- Controlled by: Mure family
- Open to the public: No
- Condition: Removed

Location
- Shown within East Ayrshire
- Coordinates: 55.676102°N 4.455712°W

Site history
- Built: 14th century
- Built by: Mures
- In use: Until 16th century
- Materials: stone

Polkelly Castle, also Pokelly, was an ancient castle located near Fenwick, at NS 4568 4524, in the medieval free Barony of Polkelly, lying north of Kilmarnock, Parish of Fenwick, East Ayrshire, Scotland. The castle is recorded as Powkelly (c1747), Pockelly (c1775), Pow-Kaillie, Ponekell, Polnekel, Pollockelly, Pollockellie, Pokellie, Pothelly, Pathelly Ha' and Polkelly. The name is given circa 1564 as Powkellie when it was held by the Cunninghams of Cunninghamhead.

== History ==
=== The Lands of Polkelly ===
Prior to the 1390s the evidence suggests that the lands of Polkelly were in the hands of the Comyns. The estate was important to the Lairds of Rowallan as it gave uninhibited access to the large and important grazing lands of Macharnock Moor, now Glenouther Moor.

In the charter of confirmation of 1512 the feudal Barony of Polkelly comprised Darclavoch, Clonherb, Clunch, with its mill, Le Gre, Drumboy, the lands of Balgray, with its tower, fortalice, manor, and mill, and the common of Mauchirnoch (Glenouther). The Lainshaw Register of Sasines records that Laigh and High Clunch were part of the lands and barony of Pollockellie or Pokellie.

In the early 16th century during the reign of King James V Polkelly is recorded as to have been held by the Cochranes family.

Dobie records that the Mures held Pow-Kaillie which extended to 2400 acres, two-thirds of which were arable.

The origins of the lands of Polkelly and Rowallan as a unit may date back to the Britonic period of the Kingdom of Strathclyde, as indicated by certain anomalies and coincidences in the boundaries of these lands.

=== The castle ===
Polkelly became the secondary power centre within the feudal Barony of Rowallan. It became of minor importance when Balgray became the principal messuage of the free barony of Polkelly in 1512. The castle lay close to the Balgray Mill Burn. The castle remains were removed in the 1850s and used to create a road, only leaving the motte, measuring 23m by 16m. In 1590 a band of pirates harassed shipping near Ailsa Craig and as a response to this act thirty hagbutters were despatched to garrison the house and fortalice of Pokelly.'

=== Lairds ===
Coat of Arms of the Muir Chief

A Gulielmus (William) de Lambristoune was a witness to a charter conveying the lands of Pokellie (Pokelly) from Sir Gilchrist More to a Ronald Mure at a date around 1280. During the reign of Alexander III (1241–1286) Sir Gilchrist Mure held Pokelly and had to shelter there until the King was able to subdue Sir Walter Cuming. For the sake of peace and security Sir Gilchrist married Sir Walter's daughter, Isabella .

In 1399 Sir Adam Mure held the castle and upon his death it passed to his second son, the eldest obtaining Rowallan. The lands of Limflare and Lowdoune Hill were included in the inheritance. The castle and Barony of Polkelly was mainly held by the medieval Mure family, however Robert Mure of Polkelly had died by 1511, leaving his daughter Margaret, Lady Polkelly, as the sole heir. Margaret married Robert Cunningham of Cunninghamhead in March 1512. The stars of the Mures were added to the armorial bearings of the Cunninghams. After 50 to 60 years the family sold Polkelly to Thomas Cochran of Kilmaronock and in 1699 it passed to his brother William. David, the first Earl of Glasgow then acquired the property and it was held by James, Earl of Glasgow in the 1870s. In the 1860s the ruins are described as the strong house of Polkelly and the remnants lay on the rising ground north of Muiryet.

In the late 15th century a Mure of Polkelly is recorded as being a royal administrator, collecting royal rents in east central Scotland.

=== Lollards ===
Helen Chalmers, sister to Margaret Chalmers of Cessnock, was tried as a Lollard supporter, pushing for religious reform in Ayrshire. Helen was the spouse of Robert Mure of Pokellie (sic).

== Moor of Machirnock (Glenouther) ==
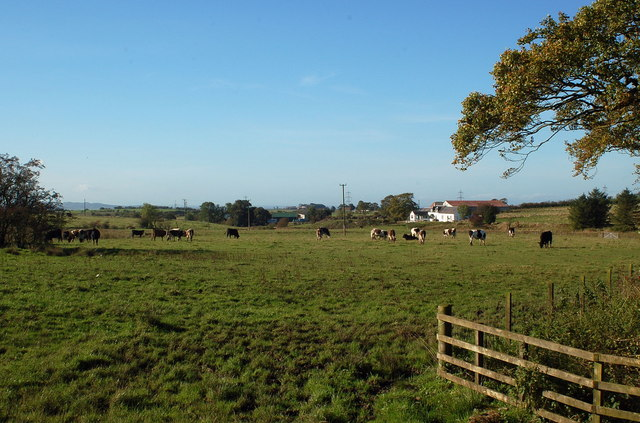
Balgray Mill, Farm and the location of Pokelly Hall in the distance

Tensions arose between the Cunninghams and Mures over their rights regarding grazing, etc on the very large and valuable area of common grazing to the north of Polkelly known as Machirnock or Maucharnock, now Glenouther. A royal letter of 1534 states that the Cunninghams had not been invested in the moor and it was decided that the souming was split between Polkelly and Rowallan. The souming was the number or proportion of cattle which each tenant was entitled to keep on the common grazing. In 1594 William Mure of Rowallan complained of the excess of Polkelly's grazing cattle and geese on the moor, despite having obtained a caution of lawburrows on May 20, 1593. Lawburrows was a letter in the monarch's name under the signet seal to the effect that a particular person had shown cause to dread harm from another, and that therefore this other complained of was commanded to find "sufficient caution and surety" that the complainer would be free from any violence on his part.

It is suggested that tensions had not arisen earlier as previously Polkelly was passed to younger sons of the Mures upon their marriage and this came with an allocation of rights on the moor.

Dobie records that the Macharnock River gave rise to the name of the Kilmarnock Water. He also states that the site of a battle between the Douglas and De Mowbray families :

"Syne till a strait place gan he ga,
That is in Makyrnokis way,
The Netherford it hat perfay;
It lyis betuix marraisses twa,
Qhuhar that na horss or lyve may ga."

== Cartographic evidence ==
Blaeu's map dating from Timothy Pont's survey of the early 17th century records a tower without any woodland policies. Armstrong's map of 1775 shows two buildings recorded as Pockelly, but neither shown as a castle or mansion. Pokelly Hall is shown for the first time on Thomson's Map of 1832. Then 1890 OS map shows Pokelly Castle within an enclosure close to the Balgray Mill Burn and situated on a road system linked to Gardrum Mill, Gainford, Crofthead and Fenwick. The name Pathelly Hall is sometimes used for Pokelly Hall in old accounts.

Cleuche lay within the Barony of Powkellie (sic) and now appears as Clunch on OS maps. Dareloch, once recorded as Darclavoch, may derive from Dir-clach meaning a land of stones. Drumboy was once named Drumbuy and had previously belonged to the Barony of Strathannan in Lanarkshire.

== James V and the King's Kitchen ==
An old thatched cottage at the top end of Stewarton, on the B769 to Glasgow, had the name of "King's Kitchenhead", more recently called Braehead. The story is told of a King, possibly James V, who whilst on his progress of administering justice was given hospitality at this cottage after crossing Fenwick Moor. The wife of the house, upon discovering the identity of her visitor, begged the King for the life of her husband who was one of those to be tried by the King. The others were hanged, but the King dismissed the husband with the admonition "to be a better bairn". A version of the legend adds the detail that eighteen men were in the dungeon at Polkelly Castle and that the King added that if he was ever caught doing wrong again then all the old wives in Christendom would not be able to save him from the hangman's noose.

The Gallow's Hill of Polkelly was long pointed out, being marked by a lone pine dule tree whilst the OS 'Name Book' records that it was a hawthorn tree as recorded in the old Statistical Account and that it stood on the lands of Damhead Farm. This tree is recorded in the 1850s as having been "cut down some 40 years ago". King James is said to have found the remaining eighteen prisoners guilty and they were hanged on the castle's dule tree.

=== King's Well and Stables ===
One version of the story of King James V losing his horse in a bog at King's Stable near Kingswell after it had drunk from the King's Well, records that he was not on his way to Sorn Castle to attend a wedding, but instead to Polkelly castle whilst on a regal tour administering justice. The site of the King's Stable is now covered by a building associated with the old coaching inn.

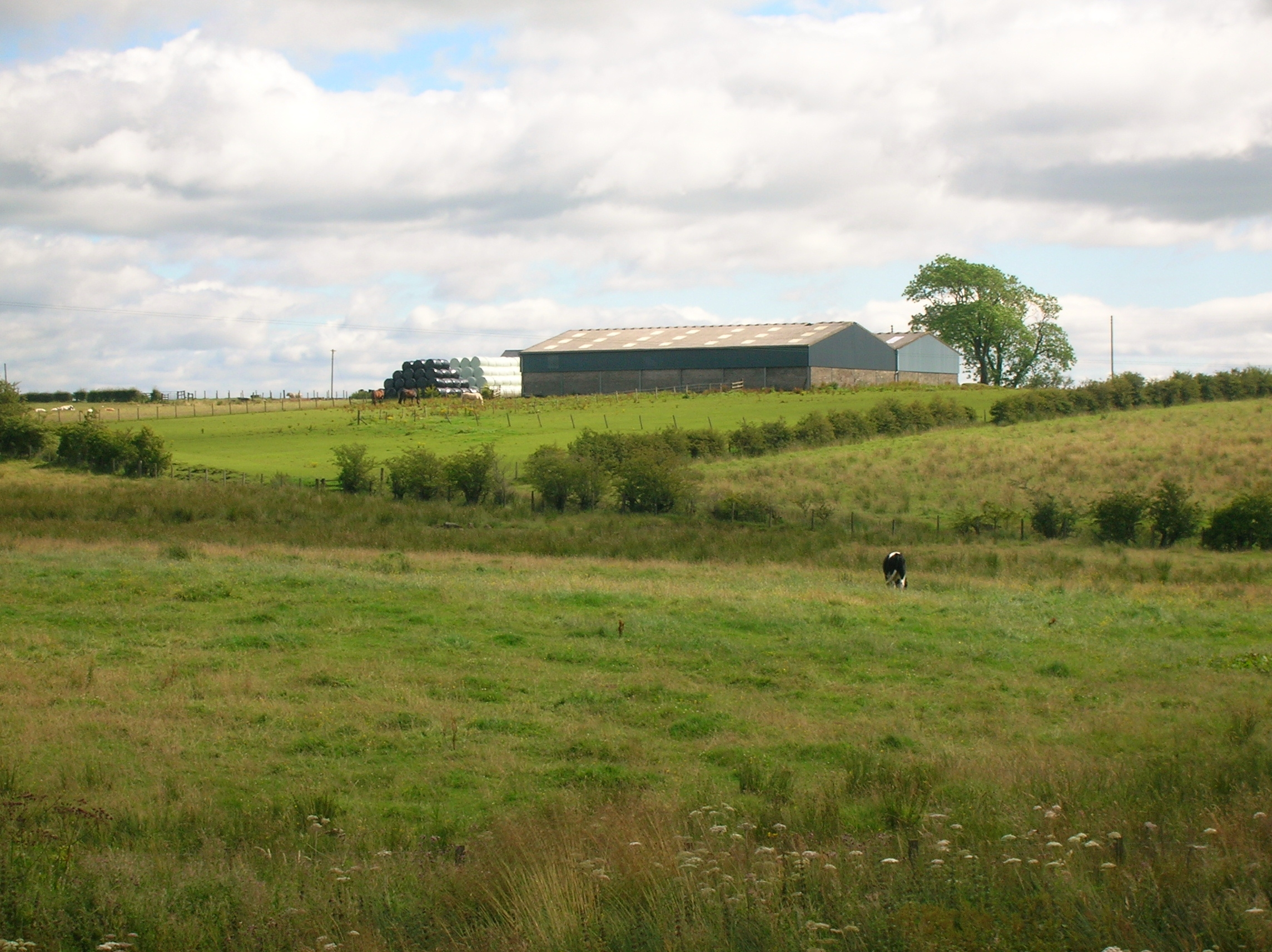
Hill of Pokelly Farm.

== Tenants ==
In March 1793 James Dunlop of Polkelly was the proprietor of Gardrum.

Robert Craufurd of Craufurdland married Elizabeth Muir, daughter of the Laird of Pokelly in the 15th century and had three sons.

Upon the death of Hugh Muir of Pokelly, Archibald Craufurd of Craufurdland married his widow, who was the eldest daughter of Archibald Boyd of Narston and Bonshaw. They had two sons and a daughter.

Diana Cunninghame was an only daughter of Sir David Cunninghame of Robertland. Diana married Thomas Cochrane of Polkelly in the mid 17th century and much of the estate was sold at around this time.

A David Poe is recorded as being of "Polkelly, a farm bordering Fenwick and Stewarton, seven miles from Irvine". This David Poe, an outlaw and covanteer of Ayrshire in 1666 who escaped to Ireland and had children there, is a likely ancestor of Edgar Allan Poe.

Another Polkelly exists in South Lanarkshire, not far from Carstairs.
