= Clan Crawford =

Lowland Scottish clan

- Crest: A stag's head erased Gules, between the attires a cross crosslet fitchée Sable
- Motto: Tutum te robore reddam (With my strength I'll give you safety)

Profile
- Region: Lowlands
- District: Lanarkshire, Renfrewshire and Ayrshire
- Plant badge: Boxwood
- Animal: stag
- Clan Crawford no longer has a chief, and is an armigerous clan
- 21st Laird of Auchinames
- Historic seat: Auchinames Castle, Renfrewshire.
- Last Chief: Adam Crawfurd of Auchinames
Clan branches
Crawford of Auchinames (chiefs)
Craufurd of Kilbirney (senior cadets)
Crawfords of Craufurdland
Craufurd of Jordanhill
Crawfurds of Baidland & Ardmillan
Dalmagregan Crawfords
Allied clans
Clan Wallace
Clan Boyd
Clan Thompson

Clan Crawford is a Scottish clan of the Scottish Lowlands. The clan is of Scandinavian and Anglo-Saxon origin. There was in the early 18th century a mistaken belief that the clan had Norman origins. While historically recognised as a clan by the Court of the Lord Lyon, it is now an armigerous clan as it no longer has a chief. The last chief was Hugh Ronald George Craufurd, who sold his land (Auchenames, Crosbie and other estates) and moved to Canada in 1904. He died in Calgary in 1942, leaving three male heirs.

== History ==
=== Origins of the clan ===
==== Legendary origins ====
The surname of Crawford comes from the barony of Crawfordjohn, adopted by around 1160. The name is taken from the barony of the same name in Lanarkshire. The early names of all of the principal Crawford families are all Norman; however, some scholars have asserted an Anglo-Danish ancestry. There is a tradition that Reginald, who was a son of the Earl of Richmond, was one of the Norman knights who were established by David I of Scotland. The Crawfords appear in a legendary incident when the king's life was saved from a stag and this led to the foundation of Holyrood Abbey. It is said that Sir Gregan Crawford was instrumental in saving his royal master's life.

==== Recorded origins ====
Sir Reginald Crawford was appointed sheriff of Ayr in 1296. His sister married Wallace of Elderslie and was mother of the Scottish patriot William Wallace. The Crawfords rallied to their Wallace cousin during the Wars of Scottish Independence. The family of the Crawford sheriff of Ayr produced the main branches of the clan: the Crawfords of Auchinames and the Crawfords of Craufurdland. The chiefly line is reckoned to be that of Auchinames in Renfrewshire who received a grant for their lands from Robert the Bruce in 1320. After the clan disbanded, the clan split into families.

=== 15th, 16th and 17th centuries ===
Sir William Crawford was knighted by James I of Scotland and fought with the Scots forces in the service of Charles VII of France. In 1423 he was wounded at the siege of Creyult in Burgundy. John of the Craufurdland branch of the clan was killed at the Battle of Flodden in 1513, as were the Lairds of Auchinames. A generation later the Laird of Auchinames was killed at the Battle of Pinkie Cleugh in 1547. Thomas Crawford of Jordanhill also fought at the Battle of Pinkie but was captured and later ransomed. In 1569 he became a member of the household of Henry Stuart, Lord Darnley when Darnley married Mary, Queen of Scots. Crawford denounced both Maitland of Letherington and Sir James Balfour as being conspirators in the murder of Darnley, however he did not sympathise with the deposed queen and in 1570 actually captured Dumbarton Castle from her forces with just one hundred and fifty men.

In the seventeenth century, Craufurdland Castle was much extended by the sixteenth Laird.

=== 18th century and Jacobite risings ===
John Walkinshaw Crawford, the twentieth Laird was a distinguished soldier who joined the army at an early age and rose to the rank of Lieutenant-Colonel. He fought in the victory at the Battle of Dettingen in 1743 against the French. Two years later he also distinguished himself at the Battle of Fontenoy. However, despite his faithful service to the house of Hanover, during the Jacobite rising of 1745, he was also a faithful friend of the Jacobite Earl of Kilmarnock (chief of Clan Boyd). In a last act of comradeship he followed Kilmarnock to the scaffold where he received the earl's severed head and attended to the solemnities of his funeral. As a result, his name was placed at the bottom of the army list, although he was restored in 1761 and appointed falconer to the king. He died in 1793 and left his entire estates to Sir Thomas Coutts. However this was contested by Elizabeth Craufurd, who eventually won her case in the House of Lords in 1806. This branch of the clan united the families of Houison (Howieson) and Craufurd and they still live at Craufurdland.

=== Later clansmen ===
Sir Alexander Craufurd of Kilbirnie was created baronet in 1781 and his son, Robert Craufurd, commanded the Light Division in the Peninsular War. He died in 1812 leading his troops in an assault on the fortress of Ciudad Rodrigo. A monument was erected to him in St Paul's Cathedral, London. Hugh Crawford, the twenty-first Laird of Auchinames, emigrated to Canada having sold the ancient clan lands in the early twentieth century.

== Clan castles ==
Castles that have been owned by the Clan Crawford include amongst many others:

- Auchinames Castle, Renfrewshire.
- Craufurdland Castle, Ayrshire.
- Almond Castle, Linlithgow.
- Loudoun Castle, Ayrshire. (later passed to the Clan Campbell).
- Kilbirnie Place, Ayrshire. The line died out in the 18th century, having passed earlier to the Craufurds of Jordanhill.

== Clan symbolism ==
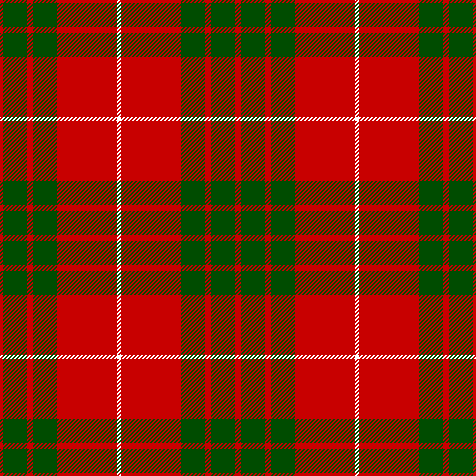
Crawford tartan

The modern crest badge of a member of Clan Crawford contains the crest: a stag's head erased Gules, between the attires a cross crosslet fitchée Sable. Encircling the crest on the crest badge is a strap and buckle engraved with the motto: TUTUM TE ROBORE REDDAM which translates from Latin as "I will give you safety through strength". The Crawford tartan is of relatively modern origin, and it is certain that there was no Crawford tartan in around 1739. The first record of a Crawford tartan is that of the "Crawfovrd" which appeared in the Vestiarium Scoticum of 1842. This is the Crawford tartan used today. The Vestiarium was the work of the Sobieski Stuarts whose influential book purported to be a reproduction of an ancient manuscript about clan tartans. Today many clan tartans are derived from the Vestiarium.

== An unusual death ==
John Craufurd of Craufurdland died in 1612, aged only 21, from an injury received at football. His widow married Sir David Barclay of Ladyland in the Parish of Kilbirnie, Ayrshire.

== See also ==
- Hugh Crawford (sheriff)
- Crawford Castle
- Giffordland, Ayrshire A cadet branch of the Craufurds of Craufurdland
