= Law Hill =

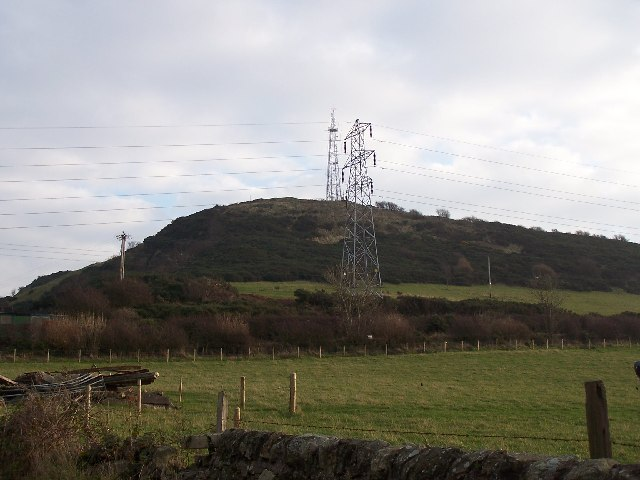

Highest point
- Elevation: 178 m (584 ft)
- Coordinates: 55.6958°N 4.8418°W

Geography
- Location: West Kilbride, Scotland
- Topo map: OS Landranger 63

Climbing
- Easiest route: walk up past Law Castle, turn at style to left of road

Law Hill is a hill overlooking the North Ayrshire town of West Kilbride, Scotland. The Firth of Clyde can be seen from the hill, with the hills of Arran beyond.

On the farm road which approaches the peak, there are a number of green huts which are used as holiday dwellings or allotments. Huts of this type were first used as retreats for military servicemen and are now commonly used by families and pensioners, although their number in Scotland has declined.

Law Castle stands on the lower slopes of the hill. The summit is capped with a large radio tower which belongs to Arqiva.
