= Law Castle =

Castle in West Kilbride, Scotland

Coordinates: 55.6961°N 4.8481°W

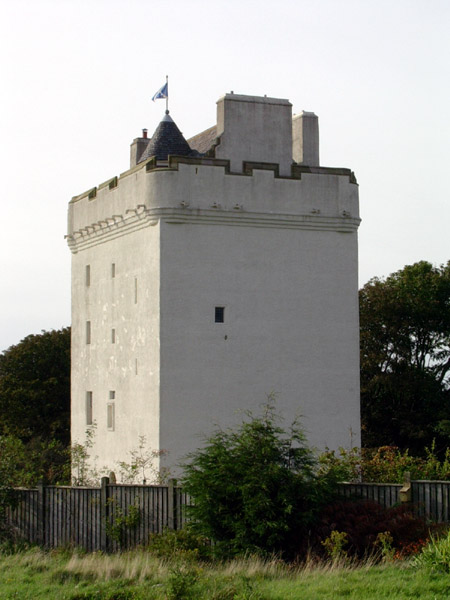
Law Castle

Law Castle is situated on the lower slopes of Law Hill on the edge of West Kilbride, in North Ayrshire, Scotland. It is around 200 metres (660 ft) from the railway station.

The castle is a simple rectangular structure with a sloped roof and several large chimneys protruding at each side. It is similar in character to other tower houses located nearby, including Little Cumbrae Castle and Skelmorlie Castle, and is a category A listed building.

It was built for Princess Mary, sister of King James III, as a wedding gift upon her marriage in 1467 to Thomas Boyd, Earl of Arran. In 1469, Thomas travelled to Denmark to escort James III's bride Margaret of Denmark, but he was forced to remain abroad as he and his father Lord Boyd were attainted for treason in 1469. The marriage was thereby annulled and Thomas died a few years later, possibly in Antwerp.

The castle was recorded as roofless but intact from the later 19th century. In the late 1980s it was purchased by a Mr Philips, who began restoration work on the castle. However, the castle was repossessed in 2002 prior to the restoration being completed, and Historic Scotland took legal action to recover £116,000 in grant funding from Mr Philips. The castle was subsequently bought by David Hutton, who completed the restoration in 2005.
