= Archibald Bell (writer) =

Scottish advocate and miscellaneous writer

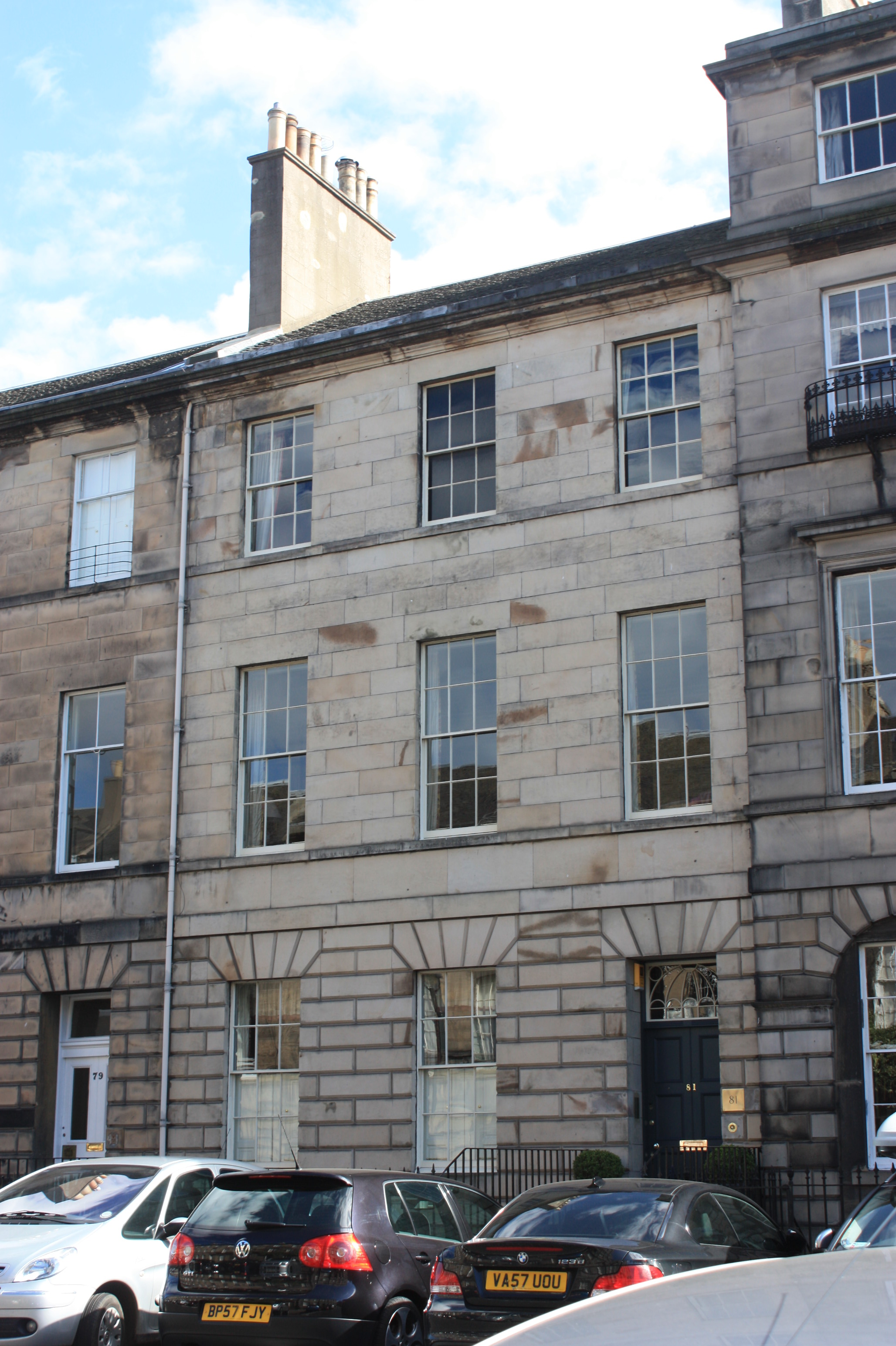
81 Great King Street, Edinburgh, home of the writer, Archibald Bell

Archibald Bell FRSE (1776–1854) was a Scottish advocate and miscellaneous writer.

== Life ==
He was born in Edinburgh the son of John Bell WS, a lawyer on 9 March 1776 (the Dictionary of National Biography states 1755).

Admitted a member of the faculty of advocates, Edinburgh in 1795, he was appointed Sheriff-Depute of Ayrshire in August 1815.

In 1821 he was elected a member of the Royal Society of Edinburgh. In 1833 he became a member of the Highland Society. At this time is home was 81 Great King Street in the Second New Town.

He died in Edinburgh 6 Oct. 1854. He is buried in Dean Cemetery on the west side of the city.

== Works ==
He was the author of: 1. 'An Inquiry into the Policy and Practice of the Prohibition of the Use of Grain in the Distilleries,' 1808, second edition, 1810. 2. 'The Cabinet, a series of Essays, Moral and Literary' (anon.), 2 vols., Edinburgh, 1835. 3. 'Count Clermont, a Tragedy; Caius Toranius, a Tragedy, with other Poems,' 1841. 4. ' Melodies of Scotland,' 1849; the last being an attempt to supply words for the old national airs of such a correct and conventional type as not to offend the susceptibilities of the most fastidious. The verses are generally tasteful and spirited, but in no case have they been successful in supplanting those associated with the old melodies.
