= Sheriff of Ayr =

Royal official responsible for enforcing law and order in Ayr, Scotland

The Sheriff of Ayr was historically (from 1221) the royal official responsible for enforcing law and order in Ayr, Scotland and bringing criminals to justice. Sundrum Castle was used by the sheriff from the 14th century, and Loudoun Castle from the 16th century. Prior to 1748 most sheriffdoms were held on a hereditary basis. From that date, following the Jacobite uprising of 1745, the hereditary sheriffs were replaced by salaried sheriff-deputes, qualified advocates who were members of the Scottish Bar.

In 1946 Bute was added to form the new sheriffdom of Ayr and Bute, which was in turn abolished in 1975 and replaced by the current sheriffdom of South Strathclyde, Dumfries and Galloway .

== Sheriffs of Ayr ==
- John of Moray (c.1170)
- Reginald Crawford, (1221 – died 1226/1229)
- Malcolm of Moray (1236)
- Hugh Crawford (died 1265), Chief of Clan Crawford, Lord of Loudon Castle)
- Walter Stewart, 1264
- William Comyn (1263–1265)
- Andrew Moray (1288)
- James Stewart, 5th High Steward of Scotland (1288)
- Reginald Crawford (1296)
- Patrick IV, Earl of March (1301)
- Robert de Brus (1303)
  - Magnus de Stratherne - 1303 - Deputy
  - Nicholas de Benhathe - 1303 - Deputy
- Godfrey de Ros (1305–)
- Robert of Laybourn (1306)
- Robert Wallace (1342)
- Duncan Wallace (1359)
- John Wallace of Craigie
- Andrew Campbell of Loudoun (died 1368)
- William Cunningham, Earl of Carrick (died between December 1396 and July 1399) (1374)
- William de Cunningham (1406)
- Hugh Campbell of Loudoun
- George Campbell of Loudoun (1450–1491)
- Hugh Campbell (died 1508)
- Hugh Campbell of Loudoun (1503–1561)
- Matthew Campbell of Loudoun (1561–1574)
- Mathew Baird, (1573)
- Hugh Campbell of Loudoun (1574–15 Dec 1622) 1st Lord of Loudoun
- William Cunningham, 9th Earl of Glencairn (1661–1664)
- John Drummond, 1st Duke of Melfort (1686–1690)
- Sir George Campbell of Cesnock (1690-)
- Hugh, Earl of Loudoun (1699–1707)
- Robert Wallace c.1723
- John, Lord Loudon (1747–1748)

Sheriffs-Depute (1748)

- William Duff, 1747–1775
- William Wallace, 1775–1786
- William Craig, Lord Craig, 1787–1792
- Edward McCormick, 1793–1814
- Archibald Bell, 1815–>1852 (died 1854)
- John Christison, <1861–1862
- Neil Colquhoun Campbell of Barnhill, 1862–1883
- John Comrie Thomson, 1883–1885
- Sir David Brand, 1885–1908
- John Campbell Lorimer, 1908–1911
- William Lyon Mackenzie, 1911–1937
- Arthur Paterson Duffes, KC, 1937–1946

== Sheriffs of Ayr and Bute (1946) ==
- Arthur Paterson Duffes, KC, 1946–1948
- Henry Wallace Guthrie, KC, 1948–1949
- James Frederick Gordon Thomson, KC, 1949–1952
- Christopher William Graham Guest, QC, 1952–1954 (Sheriff of Perth and Angus, 1954–)
- Charles James Dalrymple Shaw, QC, 1954–1957 (Sheriff of Perth and Angus, 1957–)
- John Oswald Mair Hunter, QC, 1957–1961
- Ian MacDonald Robertson, QC, 1961–1966 (Sheriff of Perth and Angus, 1966)
- Robert Howat McDonald, QC, 1966–1972
- Donald MacArthur Ross, 1972–1973
- Robert Reid, 1973–1975
- Sheriffdom abolished in 1975 and replaced by current sheriffdom of South Strathclyde, Dumfries and Galloway

== See also ==
- Historical development of Scottish sheriffdoms
