= Hugh Crawford (sheriff) =

Crosbie Manor House

Sir Hugh Crawford (c. 1195–1265) was the Second Sheriff of Ayr, Chief of Clan Crawford, and Lord of Loudoun. He probably lived in Loudon Castle even while he administrated quite some distance away in the town of Ayr. According to Burkes Peerage and the POMS database he was granted Crosbie, Fairlie and the Munnoch at West Kilbride in 1225. Although these lands were identified in the charter as held for royal hunting grounds(Alexander II), they included the rich cattle port of Portencross. Hugh is often confused with his son also named Hugh, and grandson Hugh, who fought at the Battle of Largs in 1263 and was confirmed in his holding of Crosbie by Alexander III.
