= Janet Kennedy =

Mistress of James IV of Scotland

Janet Kennedy (c. 1480 – c. 1545), was a Scottish noblewoman and mistress of King James IV of Scotland.

== Life ==
She was the eldest daughter of Lady Elizabeth Gordon and John Kennedy, 2nd Lord Kennedy . Through her father, she was a great-great-granddaughter of King Robert III, while her mother was the daughter of Alexander Gordon, 1st Earl of Huntly.

She is believed to have first been married to Alexander Gordon of Lochinvar around 1493. They may have had a daughter.

By 1497, Janet was the mistress of Archibald Douglas, 5th Earl of Angus ("Bell the Cat"), with whom she had a daughter, Mary. They also may have been married, though she was never described as his countess.

She attracted the attention of King James IV around 1497. She had three children with him: James Stewart, 1st Earl of Moray, Lady Margaret Stewart and Lady Jane Stewart. They lived for a time at Stirling Castle, and the household was the responsibility of Andrew Aytoun. The King had a number of mistresses, but this appears to have been his longest relationship, which continued even after his marriage to Margaret Tudor. After James IV's marriage by proxy, he met Janet at Bothwell Castle in April 1503, then she was sent to Darnaway Castle in August just before Margaret arrived.

James IV gave her the lordship of Bothwell Castle in September 1498, transferred from the Earl of Angus. In March 1500 the king gave her, in consideration of the "hartlie luve and invict favoris he has and beris to her", extensive lands in Menteith and the keeping of Doune Castle. It is not clear whether she is the same as the "Janet bair ars" who received gifts from the King in 1505–12.

Her daughter Lady Margaret Stewart came to court from Darnaway in April 1513, her household being accommodated at Edinburgh Castle.

Janet Kennedy also had relationships with two other men, one of them John Ramsay, 1st Lord Bothwell, whom she married in 1505. Two of her partners died at the Battle of Flodden.
