= Gilbert Kennedy, 1st Lord Kennedy =

Scottish lord

Gilbert Kennedy of Dunure, 1st Lord Kennedy (c. 1407 – 27 March 1489) was a Lord of Parliament in late medieval Scotland. He was second son of James Kennedy of Dunure and Princess Mary, daughter of Robert III of Scotland. He served as one of six Regents during the early reign of James III of Scotland, after the 1460 death of James II.

== Personal life ==
Gilbert married Katherine Maxwell, daughter of Herbert Maxwell, 1st Lord Maxwell:

- John Kennedy, 2nd Lord Kennedy, father of David Kennedy, 1st Earl of Cassillis;
- Katherine Kennedy, mother of Hugh Montgomerie, 1st Earl of Eglinton.

He married, secondly, after 1460, Isabel Ogilvy, daughter of Sir Walter Ogilvy of Lintrathen and Isabel Glen, and widow of Patrick Lyon, 1st Lord Glamis. In 1484 she sued John Kennedy for silverware which he claimed to have bought from Gilbert Kennedy, 1st Lord Kennedy. Gilbert was then said to be deceased.

== Offices and titles ==
Kennedy, created 1st Lord of Kennedy between 27 March 1457 and 20 March 1458, in addition, held the office of Keeper of the Castle of Lochdoun and the office of Constable of Stirling Castle, bestowed upon him in 1466. By that time, he was already Regent of Scotland, having secured the position on the death of James II.

== Ancestry ==
Gilbert Kennedy's ancestors in three generations
Gilbert Kennedy of Dunure, 1st Lord Kennedy	Father: Sir James Kennedy of Dunure, the Younger	Paternal Grandfather: Sir Gilbert Kennedy of Dunure	Paternal Great-grandfather: John Kennedy of Dunure
Gilbert Kennedy of Dunure, 1st Lord Kennedy	Father: Sir James Kennedy of Dunure, the Younger	Paternal Grandfather: Sir Gilbert Kennedy of Dunure	Paternal Great-grandmother: Mary Stewart
Gilbert Kennedy of Dunure, 1st Lord Kennedy	Father: Sir James Kennedy of Dunure, the Younger	Paternal Grandmother: Agnes Maxwell	Paternal Great-grandfather: Sir John Maxwell
Gilbert Kennedy of Dunure, 1st Lord Kennedy	Father: Sir James Kennedy of Dunure, the Younger	Paternal Grandmother: Agnes Maxwell	Paternal Great-grandmother: Elizabeth Isabel Lindsay
Gilbert Kennedy of Dunure, 1st Lord Kennedy	Mother: Lady Mary Stewart	Maternal Grandfather: Robert III of Scotland	Maternal Great-grandfather: Robert II of Scotland
Gilbert Kennedy of Dunure, 1st Lord Kennedy	Mother: Lady Mary Stewart	Maternal Grandfather: Robert III of Scotland	Maternal Great-grandmother: Elizabeth Mure
Gilbert Kennedy of Dunure, 1st Lord Kennedy	Mother: Lady Mary Stewart	Maternal Grandmother: Anabella Drummond	Maternal Great-grandfather: Sir John Drummond
Gilbert Kennedy of Dunure, 1st Lord Kennedy	Mother: Lady Mary Stewart	Maternal Grandmother: Anabella Drummond	Maternal Great-grandmother: Lady Mary Montifex

== See also ==
- Marquess of Ailsa

Peerage of Scotland
New creation	Lord Kennedy c.1457–1478	Succeeded by John Kennedy
