= Almond Castle =

Ruined castle in Falkirk, Scotland

Coordinates: 55.9772°N 3.6735°W

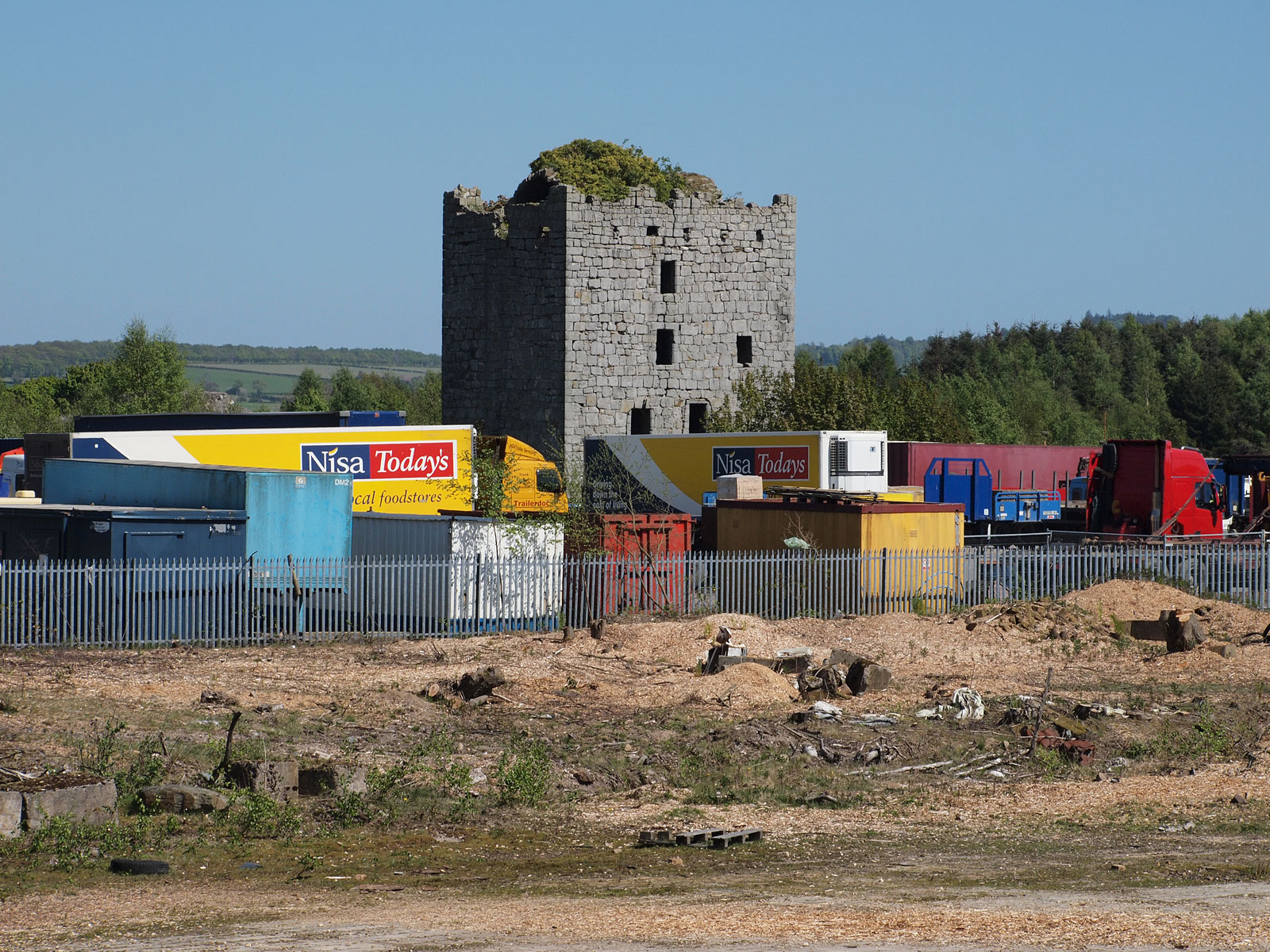
Almond Castle

Almond Castle is a ruined L-plan castle dating from the 15th century. It is located 3 miles (4.8 km) west of Linlithgow, and north of the Union Canal, in Falkirk, Scotland. It was known as Haining Castle until the 17th century. The structure is unsound and is protected as a scheduled monument.

== History ==
The estate originally belonged to the Crawford family, and they built the castle in about 1470. In about 1540 it passed by marriage to the Livingstones, who built an extension at the south west. They also built an extension along the south east wall in 1586. When James Livingstone was created Baron Livingstone of Almond in 1633 the castle's name was changed to Almond from Haining. After the Jacobite rising of 1715 the castle was forfeited to the crown by the Livingstone Earls of Callendar. It was abandoned in the 1750s. In 1783 the ruin was sold to William Forbes by the York Buildings Company.

== Structure ==
The ruin has a vaulted basement. The hall was on the first floor, while there is a kitchen in the wing. There is a courtyard, with a wall and ditch, enclosing the remains of 16th-century buildings. The castle was four storeys and a garret high. The entrance, on the long south east face, gave access to the first floor.
