= David Kennedy, 1st Earl of Cassilis =

Scottish peer

David Kennedy, 3rd Lord Kennedy and 1st Earl of Cassillis (After 1463 – 9 September 1513) was a Scottish peer, the son of John Kennedy, 2nd Lord Kennedy. He was born about 1463, in Maybole, Ayrshire, Scotland. He was a Privy Councillor of King James IV and was created Earl of Cassillis by him in 1502. He was killed at the Battle of Flodden in 1513.

== Family ==
David Kennedy married Agnes Borthwick, daughter of William Borthwick, 3rd Lord Borthwick. Their son, Gilbert, 2nd Earl of Cassillis (29 Sep 1494 – 27 Aug 1527) married Isabella Campbell daughter of Archibald Campbell, 2nd Earl of Argyll. Their daughter Katherine married William Hamilton of Sorn and Sanquhar.

After Agnes died David married Margaret Boyd, widow of Alexander Forbes and daughter of Sir Thomas Boyd, Earl of Arran and Mary Stewart, Countess of Arran, daughter of King James II of Scotland, but they had no children. Margaret Boyd is sometimes confused with Marion Boyd, daughter of Thomas Boyd, 6th Earl of Arran, who was born 69 years after David died.

Peerage of Scotland
New creation	Earl of Cassilis; 1509–1513	Succeeded by Gilbert Kennedy
Preceded by John Kennedy	Lord Kennedy; 1508–1513	Succeeded by Gilbert Kennedy
