= Alexander Boyd, 3rd Lord Boyd =

Scottish noble

Alexander Boyd, 3rd Lord Boyd (died after 1508) was a Scottish noble. (Note: Balfour 1904, p. 155 Notes that Considerable confusion exists as to the numbering of the Lords Boyd. In the Complete Peerage Balfour's Robert, 5th Lord Boyd is considered the 3rd Lord, though in the Dictionary National Bibliography (Rigg 1886, pp. 96, 97), as in Douglas, "he is, for some cause, called the fourth Lord, though, if the attainder is not reckoned (whereby three persons, viz. (1) the Earl of Arran (living 1472); (2) James Boyd (died 1484), son and heir of the Earl of Arran; and (3) Alexander Boyd (living 1505), uncle and heir of the said James, were excluded from the succession), he would apparently have been sixth Lord", (Douglas see p. 399, note 6). Balfour states that it is now known that the Earl of Arran died v.p., and that James was restored as Lord Boyd in 1482, therefore this Robert was apparently de facto fourth Lord. As, however, there is some doubt on the point, the present writer has determined to reckon them as if each head of the family since the original creation of 1454 had actually succeeded to the Peerage, as indeed but for the attainder of 1469 they would have done. Cokayne writing a decade after agreed with Balfour's numbering (Cokayne 1912, p. 160), as does Hewitt the author of the 21st century article "Boyd, Robert, fifth Lord Boyd (c.1517–1590)" in the Oxford Dictionary of National Biography (Hewitt 2004).)

== Biography ==
Alexander Boyd, uncle and heir, and, but for the attainder of 1469, Lord Boyd (he does not appear to have been recognised as such), being second son of Robert 1st Lord Boyd. He became head of the family on the death of his 15-year-old nephew James, 2nd Lord Boyd in 1484. He was Chamberlain of Kilmarnock before 2 August 1488 and a witness to the sasine of Queen Margaret to the Lordship of Kilmarnock on 19 April 1504. He was still living 26 June 1508. He was said to be a favourite of King James IV.

== Family ==
Alexander Boyd married Janet, sister of Sir William and daughter of Sir Robert Colville of Ochiltree on 23 November 1505. They were related within the third and third and fourth and fourth degrees of consanguinity, and had a dispensation for the marriage already contracted between them and legitimising the children already born, 23 November 1505. Their children were:

- Robert, his heir and the 4th Lord Boyd
- Thomas (died 1547), ancestor of the Boyds of Pitcon
- Adam (died after 21 November 1577), ancestor of the Boyds of Penkill and Trochri
- Three other sons
- Margaret, wife of George Colquhoun, 3rd of Glens, by whom she had an only daughter and heiress, Margaret, who married her cousin-german, Robert Boyd, 5th Lord Boyd.
- Euphemia, wife of John Logie of Logiealmond in Perthshire, by whom she had issue a daughter and heiress Margaret, who married Thomas Hay, and was mother of George Hay, 7th Earl of Erroll (d. 1573)

== Notes ==
Footnotes

Citations

Peerage of Scotland
Preceded by James Boyd	Lord Boyd; 1484 – after 1508	Succeeded by Robert Boyd
