= Alexander Montgomerie, 1st Lord Montgomerie =

15th-century Scottish noble

Alexander Montgomerie, 1st Lord Montgomerie (died c. 1470) was a Scottish nobleman and diplomat.

== Life ==
He was the eldest son of Sir John Montgomerie of Ardrossan (d. before 22 November 1429), by his wife Agnes, daughter of John of Islay, Lord of the Isles. In 1425 he was chosen a member of the privy council of James I. He succeeded his father some time before 22 November 1429, and in August 1430 he was, jointly with his brother-in-law, Sir Robert Cunningham of Kilmaurs, appointed governor of Kintyre and Knapdale.

On 30 November 1436 Montgomerie was appointed a commissioner to conclude a treaty with England, and he was one of the conservators of the truce concluded on 31 March for nine years. With the other Scottish commissioners he received the present of a silver cup from Henry VI of England. On 5 February 1444 he had a safe-conduct to go to Durham to treat for the extension of the truce and the return of the Scottish hostages.

In 1444 Montgomerie was appointed keeper of Brodick Castle on the Isle of Arran. He was one of those who set their seals to instruments passed by the parliament held at Perth, Scotland on 9 June 1445 against the lords who had rebelled against James II. He was created a lord of parliament by the title of Lord Montgomerie some time before 3 July 1445; and on 14 August 1451 he was a conservator for a truce with England, and in subsequent years he was sent to England on further embassies. He died about 1470.

== Family ==
With his wife Margaret, Montgomerie had three or four sons and three daughters:

- Alexander, master of Montgomerie and father of Hugh Montgomerie, 1st Earl of Eglinton;
- George, ancestor of the Montgomeries of Skelmorlie;
- Thomas, parson of Eaglesham, and rector of the university of Glasgow;
- John of Giffen (doubtful);
- Margaret, married to John Stewart, 1st Earl of Lennox;
- Elizabeth, to John Kennedy, 2nd Lord Kennedy; and
- Agnes, to William Cunningham of Glengarnock.

== Notes ==
Attribution:

- This article incorporates text from a publication now in the public domain: Lee, Sidney, ed. (1894). "Montgomerie, Alexander de". Dictionary of National Biography. Vol. 38. London: Smith, Elder & Co.

Peerage of Scotland
New creation	Lord Montgomerie; 1449–1470	Succeeded by Alexander Montgomerie
