= John Kennedy, 2nd Lord Kennedy =

Scottish lord (1436–1508)

John Kennedy
- 2nd Lord Kennedy
- Predecessor: Gilbert Kennedy, 1st Lord Kennedy
- Successor: David Kennedy, 1st Earl of Cassilis
- Born: 12 October 1436
- Died: 29 December 1508 (aged 72)
- Noble family: Kennedy
- Spouses: Elizabeth Montgomerie; Lady Elizabeth Gordon; Elizabeth Kennedy
- Issue: David Kennedy, 1st Earl of Cassillis; Elizabeth Kennedy, Lady Avondale; Janet Kennedy; Margaret Kennedy
- Father: Gilbert Kennedy, 1st Lord Kennedy
- Mother: Catherine Maxwell

John Kennedy, PC, 2nd Lord Kennedy (12 October 1436 – 29 December 1508) was a Scottish lord, the son of Gilbert Kennedy, 1st Lord Kennedy and Catherine Maxwell. He succeeded to the title of 2nd Lord Kennedy in 1489 after the death of his father. He was a Commissioner to treat with the English in 1484. He was invested as a Privy Counsellor (P.C.) in Scotland to King James III of Scotland.

== Family ==
John Kennedy married three times:

His first wife was Elizabeth Montgomerie, daughter of Alexander Montgomerie, 1st Lord Montgomerie, before 25 March 1460, and by her, he had three daughters and a son David Kennedy, 1st Earl of Cassillis (1463–1513) who married Agnes Borthwick.

His second wife was Lady Elizabeth Gordon, daughter of Alexander Gordon, 1st Earl of Huntly and Elizabeth Crichton, whom he married between 24 August 1467 and 12 August 1471. By her, he had three sons and four daughters, including Elizabeth Kennedy, Lady Avondale (c. 1462 – c. 1510), Janet Kennedy (c. 1480 – c. 1545) and Margaret Kennedy.

His third wife whom he married after 1500 was known also as Elizabeth Kennedy.

Peerage of Scotland
Preceded by Gilbert Kennedy	Lord Kennedy c. 1480–1508	Succeeded by David Kennedy
