= Petty Castle =

- Petty, Highland, Scotland

Site information
- Condition: Ruined

Location
- Location in Highland, Scotland
- Coordinates: 57.5213°N 4.1082°W

Site history
- Built: c. 13th century
- Materials

Petty Castle, near Petty, Highland, Scotland, was a motte-and-bailey castle. The castle was the caput of the barony of Petty. Petty was held by the de Moravia family in the 13th century. The motte and bailey castle appears to have been replaced by the House of Petty by the 16th century, as the motte and bailey was known as Halhill, after being raided by the Mackintosh family, after the lands were given to John Ogilvy of Strathearn.

An inventory of the contents in 1517 includes masonry tools; halberds, axes, and Jedburgh staves, bows and arrows, and armour; wool and linen cloth and yarn; clothes and furniture; five barrels of wine; and farm tools and ploughs.

The Mackintosh family was later granted Petty. The lands were granted to James Stewart, 1st Earl of Moray by his half-sister, Mary, Queen of Scots, following her return to Scotland in 1561. Castle Stuart was erected to the south east and was completed in 1625.
