= Robert Boyd, 5th Lord Boyd =

Former Lord Provost of Glasgow

Robert Boyd, 5th Lord Boyd (c. 1517 – 3 January 1590) was a Scottish noble and courtier. (Note: Balfour 1904, p. 155 Notes that Considerable confusion exists as to the numbering of the Lords Boyd. In the Complete Peerage this Robert is considered 3rd Lord, though in the Dictionary National Bibliography (Rigg 1886, pp. 96, 97), as in Douglas, "he is, for some cause, called the fourth Lord, though, if the attainder is not reckoned (whereby three persons, viz. (1) the Earl of Arran (living 1472); (2) James Boyd (died 1484), son and heir of the Earl of Arran; and (3) Alexander Boyd (living 1505), uncle and heir of the said James, were excluded from the succession), he would apparently have been sixth Lord", (Douglas see p. 399, note 6). Balfour states that it now known that the Earl of Arran died v.p., and that James was restored as Lord Boyd in 1482, therefore this Robert was apparently de facto fourth Lord. As, however, there is some doubt on the point, the present writer has determined to reckon them as if each head of the family since the original creation of 1454 had actually succeeded to the Peerage, as indeed but for the attainder of 1469 they would have done. Cokayne writing a decade after agreed with Balfour's numbering (Cokayne 1912, p. 160), as does Hewitt the author of the 21st century article "Boyd, Robert, fifth Lord Boyd (c.1517–1590)" in the Oxford Dictionary of National Biography (Hewitt 2004).)

== Early career ==
Robert was the only son and heir of Robert, 4th Lord Boyd. He was born about 1517, and first appears in the historical record on 5 May 1534, when he was appointed Bailie and Chamberlain of Kilmarnock in place of his father. On 6 September 1545, he, as son and heir-apparent of Robert Boyd of Kilmarnock, had a charter of the Lordship of Kilmarnock on his father's resignation, with sasine following 22 September. On 10 February 1549, he granted a charterer to Marion Colquhoun, (Note: Balfour 1904, p. 156 gives the date as February 1548-49. In this article dates are Julian with the start of the year from 1 January (see Old Style and New Style dates)) his father's wife, and he himself had a charter of the lands of Auchiutorlie and others on 14 October 1550. In his time was ended the Boyd-Montgomerie feud, which had lasted since 1484.

Boyd first appears in Parliament when it met at Edinburgh 29 November 1558, and he was then elected on the Articles. In 1560, Hew Montgomerie of Hessilheid, was one of the witnesses to the contract between Robert Lord Boyde and Neil Montgomery of Langschaw, at Glasgow.

== Scottish Reformation ==
Boyd supported Lords of the Congregation, in their war with Mary of Guise the Queen-Regent, and was with them at Perth May 1559. In February 1560 he was one of the signatories to the Treaty of Berwick, by which Queen Elizabeth I of England agreed to send a force to assist them in driving out the French, and the following April he joined the English army at Prestonpans. On the 27 of that month he was one of the Scottish nobles who signed the bond pledging themselves "to set forward the reformation of religion and to expel the French."

Robert Boyd was present at the unsuccessful attack made on Leith on 7 May by the English, and on 10 May signed the document by which the Treaty of Berwick was confirmed. On 16 August 1560 he signed the address to Elizabeth, praying her to marry the James Hamilton, 3rd Earl of Arran, and on 27 January 1561 he subscribed the "Book of Discipline of the Kirk". He was also a party to the bond signed at Ayr on 3 September the following year to "maintain and assist the preaching of the Evangel".

== Mary, Queen of Scots ==
On 25 August 1563, Robert, Lord Boyd and Hugh Montgomerie, 4th Earl of Eglinton, entered into a mutual bond of defence, In 1563 the same Hew Montgomerie signing himself Hugo of Hessilheid witnessed an Instrument of Assignation [land deed] by Hugh 3rd Earl of Eglington to Robert Lord Boyde of the bailliary lands of the canon lands in Cunningham.

Boyd took part in the attempt on Edinburgh after the marriage of Queen Mary to Lord Darnley, an action of the Chaseabout Raid, for which he was cited to appear before the King and Queen on 6 September, and before the Privy Council 29 October. He was declared guilty of lèse majesté on 1 December 1565. Shortly afterwards, on 6 March 1566, he had a pardon from "Henry, King of Scots", and was commanded to repair to Court. Boyd's political attitude now underwent a complete change. (Note: Paul Balfour states: "If any credit is to be given to the, so called, dying declaration of Bothwell, Boyd, according to that version of it which is found in Keith (Keith & Lyon 1850, p. 305), was privy to the murder of Darnley. His name, however, is not mentioned in the copy, or rather abstract, preserved in the Cottonian Library, nor in the fragment, Cal. Docs., iii. fol. 519, in the same collection (Rigg 1886, pp. 96, 97), and the original was in all probability a forgery" (Balfour 1904, p. 157). Hewitt in the ODNB does not mention Boyd's alleged part in the murder (Hewitt 2004).) He was one of the jury who acquitted Bothwell, 12 April 1567, and 17 May following, two days after the Queen's forced marriage with that nobleman, was made a Privy Councillor.

After Queen Mary was captured at the battle of Carberry Hill and taken to Lochleven Castle, Boyd was unceasing in his efforts to obtain the release and restoration of his Queen. Nevertheless he joined Regent Moray's Privy Council, until Mary's escape from Lochleven on 2 May 1568. He joined her at Hamilton with two of his sons and a considerable force, and fought for her at the battle of Langside on 13 May. After that defeat he retired to Kilmarnock, and on 24 May was ordered by the Council to deliver the castle of Kilmarnock and tower of Law. He joined in the letter to the Duke of Alva (general and governor of the Spanish Netherlands), asking for his assistance on Mary's behalf, 30 July.

In September 1568, Boyd was appointed one of Bishop John Lesley's colleagues for the conference to be held at York, and while there is accused of having "practised to steale away" Mary secretly. He afterwards accompanied the Bishop to London, and was one of the Commissioners for Queen Mary.

Lord Boyd was with Mary when she moved from Bolton Castle on 26 January 1569. He wrote to his wife and the lairds of Rowallan and Crawfurdland from Rotherham as they journeyed to Tutbury Castle. The letters were intercepted at Carlisle. Boyd was entrusted by Thomas, Duke of Norfolk with a diamond to deliver to Queen Mary at Coventry as a pledge of his affection and fidelity, and in a letter to him, apparently written in December 1569, she says: "I took the diamant from my lord Boyd, which I shall kepe unseene about my neck till I give it agayn to the owner of it and me both".

On 4 June 1569, Mary appointed him to negotiate with her subjects of Scotland about a reconciliation and to proceed in an action for a divorce from Bothwell. The Privy Council decided to do nothing, and after reporting the failure of his mission to Mary, Lord Boyd appears to have remained in England for some time, during which the record of his life is very scanty. At this time he stood very high in the estimation of Mary, who desired to retain him, with the Bishop of Ross, permanently in her English household. Permission for this was granted by Elizabeth on 30 March 1570.

Before this permission was received, however, Boyd had returned to Scotland, and was actively engaged in preparing for a general rising in Mary's favour. He was suspected of complicity in the murder of the James, 1st Earl of Moray on 22 January 1570, and was with the Hamiltons at Glasgow 17 February. On 22 February, he and the Earl of Argyll met the Earl of Morton and William Maitland of Lethington at Dalkeith Palace, and on 16 April he signed the letter from the Duke of Châtellerault to Queen Elizabeth, praying her to come to an agreement with Mary. In June 1570 he is mentioned as being at Kilmarnock and remaining "constantly at the Queen's obedience". Randolph wrote to Sussex on 21 August that "The brute (rumour) is that Lord Boyd is taken".

In September 1570, Queen Mary mentions him as one of the nobles from whom two could be chosen to treat on her behalf with Elizabeth, and the Bishop of Ross writes to him, 1 October: "The English will be content to restore the Queen of Scotland to her realm, I take it. But tliat they have the Prince, her son, in their hands". Early in 1571 he appears to have been again in England; on 10 March the Bishop of Ross writes to Burghley: "Morton promised to Boyd before his departure out of Scotland to abstain from all that might hinder the Queen's restitution, and to agree", but he was back at Edinburgh in April, and on 30 May Morton declared to him that the treaty was dissolved.

== Marian Civil War ==
Boyd attended the meeting of the nobility at Dunblane on 17 July 1571, and is recorded as having endeavoured to bring all to the Queen's side; but on 12 August he, together with the Earls of Argyll, Cassillis, and Eglinton, considering the "calamite quhairwith this realme, thair native cuntre, is plagit", and that the Queen was detained in England, came to an agreement with the Earls of Morton and Mar to serve the King.

The Queen had evidently anticipated something of the kind, as on 28 June she had written to the French diplomat Bertrand de Salignac de la Mothe-Fénelon that she was advised that Argyll, Atholl, and Boyd "comme désespérés d'aucuue ayde commancent à se rettirer et regarder qui aura du meilleur".

On 5 September Lord Boyd was a consenting party to the election of the Earl of Mar as Regent, and two days afterwards was made a privy councillor. The same day he signed the admonition to those who held Edinburgh against the King. On 8 September he had a remission under the Great Seal. He was included in the Act of Indemnity of 26 January 1572, and subscribed the Articles of Pacification at Perth on 23 February 1573, by one of which he was appointed one of the judges of the trial of claims for restitution of goods arising out of acts of violence committed during the Civil War; Provost of Glasgow 1574 to 1577, and an Extraordinary Lord of Session 24 October 1573.

== Regent Morton ==
On 2 January 1574 Boyd obtained from Morton charters of the offices of Bailiary and Justiciary of the regality of Glasgow for himself and his heirs, having in the previous November forcibly ejected Sir John Stewart. The same year he was appointed a Commissioner for musters in the Bailiary of Cunningham. Boyd lost his seat both at the Council table and on the Bench, but on Morton's appointment as Prime Minister in July he was again appointed a Privy Councillor, and on 25 October had his seat on the Bench restored to him.

Regent Morton appointed Boyd as Collector of Thirds, an income stream for the expenses of the royal household. On 23 October he was compelled to surrender the Bailiary of the Regality of Glasgow to the King, as Earl of Lennox. On 8 September he was one of the eight noblemen nominated by the King for quieting the troubles "that be thair gude counsale and assistence sa gude and necessar [sic] a work may proceid and be set fordwart, to the plesour of God, his Hienes obedience and the repose and quietnes of the troublit commounwelth".

On 1 May 1575, Boyd was appointed to a commission to arrest the Lords John and Claude Hamilton, who were charged with the murders of the Regents Moray and Lennox. They, however, made good their escape into England. The commissioners were thanked by Parliament for their services on 22 May. Lord Boyd was a party to the conspiracy known as the Raid of Ruthven, but on its collapse he retired to France, from whence he was recalled by a highly complimentary letter from King James, dated 11 February 1586. He was back in Scotland before 21 June, when for the third time he was appointed an Extraordinary Lord of Session, and he was one of the three Scottish commissioners who negotiated the treaty of alliance with England, which was signed 5 July.

== Later life ==
On 4 April 1588 he was a commissioner to raise the £100,000 for the expenses connected with the King's marriage. On 4 July that year he resigned his seat on the bench.' In 1589 he was placed on the commission to enforce the statute against the Jesuits, and in October, on the King's leaving for Norway, was constituted one of the Wardens of the Marches, with a seat on the Council. This was his last public appearance, and he died 3 January 1590, aged seventy-two, having for over thirty years played a prominent part in Scottish history. He was buried in the Low Church at Kilmarnock. His will was proved at Edinburgh, 8 June 1590.

George R. Hewitt writing of Robert Boyd in the Oxford Dictionary of National Biography wrote:

For over thirty years Boyd had been a conspicuous figure in Scottish affairs. Initially he was both a staunch Marian and an ultra-protestant with anglophile sympathies. Latterly, once Mary's cause was indisputably lost, his religious and political outlook dictated most of his actions. The policies pursued by Morton during his regency were highly sympathetic to a man of Boyd's views, making the 1570s the most successful period of his long career.

== Family ==
Boyd had been careful to pursue the policy commenced by his father in cultivating the support and friendship of his neighbours. Among the Boyd Papers are numerous bonds of manrent. He had, however, broken the old family alliance with the Mures, and a feud continued for several years, till, on 14 September 1589, Lord Boyd paid John Mure of Rowallan 350 marks for the slaughter of his father.

On 24 August 1536 Humphrey Colquhoun of Luss, as lord superior, granted to Robert Boyd and Margaret Colquhoun, daughter and heiress of John [sic] Colquhoun of Glinns, his spouse, a charter of the lands of Glens, in Stirling, and they had, 18 February 1547, a charter under the Great Seal of Balindoran in the same county. He acquired the barony of Portincross and Ardneill from Robert Boyd of that place by contract, 19 April 1572, and had sasine 24 May 1574, following a Crown charter of 11 March of the said lands "formerly belonging to Archibald Boyd". He also had charters of Giflardland, on resignation by Isabella and Margaret Oraufurd, 14 September 1577, and of Bedlay, Molany, etc. 10 February 1582-83.

Lord Boyd married (contract dated 1535) his cousin-german, Margaret, daughter and heiress of George (not Sir John) Colquhoun, 4th of Glens, by his wife Margaret Boyd, by which marriage the estates of Glens, Bedlay, Benheath, Stablegreen of Glasgow, and other lands passed to the Boyds. She survived him, (Note: Balfour 1904, p. 161 notes: Margaret Boyd is said to have re-married Thomas Craufurd, Provost of Glasgow 1577, but this is impossible. See Scottish Antiquary, iv. 76.) and died a widow August 1601, being buried in the Metropolitan Church of Glasgow, where there is a tomb to her beside St. Mungo's well in the south-east of the lower church. By her will, dated 13 May 1601, she appointed Alexander Colquhoun of Colquhoun and Luss her executor. They had issue : —

1. Thomas, Lord Boyd.
2. Robert of Badenheath or Badinhaith in Stirlingshire. He fought for his Queen at Langside 13 May 1568, for which he had pardon 8 September 1571. On 4 March 1572 he was appointed Keeper of the fortalice of Lochwood, with the pertinents and lands in barony of Glasgow, and had a pass 23 April 1585 from James VI to go to France for three years, "having certain lefull effaires to do within the realm of France, and specialize for visiting of our traist cousing Robert, Lord Boyd". He was appointed tutor to his nephew Hugh Montgomerie, 5th Earl of Eglinton, after the murder of his brother-in-law 18 April 1586. He was one of the lesser Barons summoned to the Convention of Estates at Edinburgh 7 June 1605. He died July 1611. His testament, which was made at his "dwelling-house of Badenheath" 14 July 1611, was confirmed at Glasgow 4 May following. He directed that his "body to be buried in his predecessor's aisle, at the Kirk of Leinze". He married Margaret, Lady Badenheath, daughter of William, and sister and heiress of Robert Boyd, both of Badenheath. She was alive April 1567 and dead by February 1572-73.
3. Margaret, married (contract 7 December 1554) to John Cuningham of Cuninghamhead. Her father and grandfather were both parties to the contract.
4. Helen. By a charter of Hugh Montgomerie of Hesilliead 10 January 1560, following on a contract between the said Hugh and Robert, Lord Boyd and Helen Boyd, his daughter, dated at Glasgow 27 December 1559, she had the ten-merk land of Lyandcorse, in the parish of Neilstoun, Renfrewshire, and the twenty-pound lands of Williyard, in the parish of Beith, "in her pure, spotless, and inviolate virginity", to hold all the days of her life.
5. Eqidia or Giles. (Note: Balfour 1904, p. 162 notes "She is the daughter first named by Wood, but it seems probable that she was a younger daughter. She was a minor at the time of her marriage in 1576, while her sister Agnes was married in 1564".) She was married, as first wife, to Hugh (Montgomerie), Master of Eglintoun, afterwards (3 June 1585) fourth Earl of Eglintoun. The contract wherein she is called Gelis, is dated at Edinburgh, Irvine, and Baidlay 13, 16, and 20 May 1576. They were both under age, the said Hugh being only fourteen, and provision was made for the management of their household and income until he attained the age of seventeen in 1580. She had issue, and died after 1583, and before March 1586.
6. Agnes, married, as second wife, to Sir John Colquhoun of Luss, who can have been a widower only a month or two at most. Being related within the forbidden degrees, a dispensation was granted by John Hamilton, Archbishop of St. Andrews, the Papal Legate, 3 November 1564. He died January 1575. She died at Edinburgh 18 July 1584. Her testament-dative and inventar of goods was given up by her son. Sir Humphrey Colquhoun, and confirmed 18 April 1588.
7. Christian, married (contract 9 January 1571) to Sir James Hamilton of Evandale and Libbertoun, son and heir of James Hamilton of Orawfurdjohn, and had issue.
8. Elisabeth, married, before 6 February 1576, to Sir John Cunningham of Drumquhassill, a widower, with issue, who was dead before 5 June 1590.

Boyd had besides two natural sons:

1. Bishop Andrew Boyd of Argyll.
2. Colonel Daind Boyd of Tourgill. Daind had letters of legitimation under the Great Seal 11 July 1582 and a grant of the lands of Tourgill 8 August 1598. David Boyd of Tourgill, Provost, appears as a witness at Edinburgh 6 November 1613. Daind married Margaret Wallace, Lady Hayning, a widow.

== Attribution ==
Peerage of Scotland
Preceded by Robert Boyd	Lord Boyd; 1558–1590	Succeeded by Thomas Boyd
