= James Boyd, 2nd Lord Boyd =

Scottish peer

James Boyd 2nd Lord Boyd (c. 1469–1484) was a Scottish peer. He was the grandson and heir of Robert Boyd, 1st Lord Boyd. His parents were Thomas Boyd, Earl of Arran, and Mary, eldest daughter of King James II. His father Thomas was the eldest son of the 1st Lord Boyd, but died in about 1472 while his father still lived.

In 1482, on the death of his grandfather, although a minor, James became the titular head of the Boyd family. James was restored to his lands on 14 October 1482, but has been generally supposed by Peerage writers not to have been restored to his honours. He was however sasine of various lands, on three different dates in October 1482, as James Lord Boyd, and was witness to a charter on January 1484 under the same designation. Nevertheless, he was killed in a feud with Hugh Montgomery of Eglintoun in 1484, when he must have been under sixteen. According to Boyd of Trochrig, "in ipso adolescentis flore periit inimicorum insidiis circumventus" (In the very young flower cut off, the enemy plots). James was unmarried, and on his death, Kilmarnock reverted to the Crown.

Peerage of Scotland
Preceded by Robert Boyd	Lord Boyd; 1482–1484	Succeeded by Alexander Boyd
