= Robert Boyd, 1st Lord Boyd =

Scottish statesman

Robert Boyd, 1st Lord Boyd (died c. 1482) was a Scottish statesman, Lord Chamberlain of Scotland from 1467.

== Biography ==
Robert Boyd was knighted and was created a Peer of Parliament (Lord Boyd) by James II of Scotland at some date between 1451 and 18 July 1454 (the date he took his seat in Parliament). In 1460 he was one of the Regents during the minority of James III. In 1464 he was one of the commissioners at York for a truce with Edward IV of England.

The date of creation of Boyd's title can be further narrowed to between 1451 and 15 June 1452. On the latter date, the King confirmed the charter of Robert Boyd, Lord of Kilmarnock and of Dalry, conveying one-third of the lands of Lynn in Dalry to Robert Boyd [indweller] of Lynn. Only three months earlier, Andrew Lynn in Dalry was described in another charter as Lord of that Ilk, meaning lord of a property of the same name as his family name.

Lord Boyd conspired with his brother, Sir Alexander Boyd, and obtained possession of young James III in 1466. He was then made by Act of Parliament sole Governor of the Realm, Lord Chamberlain of Scotland for life, and Lord Justice General in 1467. Early in that year, he procured the marriage of his eldest son, Thomas, (created Earl of Arran for that occasion) with Mary Stewart, Princess of Scotland, elder sister of James III, which aroused the jealousy of the other nobles and made his eventual downfall inevitable, since King James III regarded the marriage of his sister as an unforgivable insult.

Lord Boyd obtained the cession of the Orkney Islands to Scotland, on 8 September 1468, from Christian I, King of Norway, for whose daughter Margaret, he negotiated a marriage with James III. While absent for that purpose he and his son Thomas (the Earl of Arran) and his brother (and coadjutor) Sir Alexander Boyd, were attainted for high treason, whereby his peerage became forfeited. He was living Easter 1480/1, and died before October 1482, it is said, at Alnwick in Northumberland where he had fled in 1469.

James III's biographer sums Boyd up as an unscrupulous political gambler and an inveterate optimist. To forcibly assume guardianship of an underage King was a familiar path to power in medieval Scotland, but it was also a dangerous path. Boyd underestimated the dangers, overestimated his support, and made the fatal mistake of marrying his son to the King's sister, an insult the King would not forgive.

== Family ==
Robert Boyd belonged to an old and distinguished family, of which one earlier Sir Robert Boyd, had fought with Sir William Wallace and Robert The Bruce. He was the son and heir of Sir Thomas Boyd of Kilmarnock (died 9 July 1439). Robert married Mariot (or Janet), daughter of Sir John Maxwell, son of Robert Maxwell of Calderwood. She died after 25 June 1472, apparently early in 1473. They had three sons:

- Thomas, Earl of Arran, was in Denmark when his father was overthrown. However, he fulfilled his mission, that of bringing the king's bride, Margaret, to Scotland, and then, warned by his wife, escaped to the continent of Europe. He is mentioned very eulogistically in one of the Paston Letters, but practically nothing is known of his subsequent history;
- Alexander, who became head of the family after the death of James, the son of his elder brother Thomas;
- Archibald of Nariston, and afterwards in Bonshaw. Archibald is recorded as being of Nariston in 1472, but it appears that there was a question over his right to the property and he had lost possession by 1500. In 1502 Archibald and his wife Christine Mure had a lease of Bonschaw and Dririg. He was dead before 4 May 1507, when Christine Mure, his widow, and her sons, paid a year's rent on taking over the lease. She was living on 28 January 1523. They appear to have had two sons and three daughters, one of whom was Marion Boyd, mistress to King James IV and mother of at least two children by him.

== Sources ==
Peerage of Scotland
New title	Lord Boyd; 1454–1482	Succeeded by James Boyd
