= Hugh Montgomerie, 1st Earl of Eglinton =

Scottish peer (c. 1460–1545)

1st Earl of Eglinton
- In office 1506–1545

Personal details
- Died: June 1545

Hugh Montgomerie, 1st Earl of Eglinton (c. 1460 – June 1545) was a Scottish peer.

== Life ==
He was born about 1460 as the eldest son of Alexander Montgomerie, 2nd Lord Montgomerie, by his wife Catherine, daughter of Gilbert, lord Kennedy. His grandfather was Alexander Montgomerie, 1st Lord Montgomerie. He succeeded his father before 29 August 1483. He was invested with the lands of Ardrossan and other estates of the family 5 June 1484, and on 11 October he executed a revocation of all acts made during his minority. He was one of the commissioners appointed by the treaty of Nottingham on 22 September of the same year to settle disputes on the marches.

Having supported the cause of the nobles against James III at the Battle of Sauchieburn, 1 June 1488, he, on the accession of James IV, obtained a remission for throwing down the house of Turnelaw (Kerrielaw), and for all other offences committed by him up to 29 August. He had also a commission to repress crime in the districts of Carrick, Kyle, Ayr, and Cunningham.

In the following year, he was chosen a privy councillor, and appointed constable of the royal Rothesay Castle. On 4 July 1498, he obtained a grant of the bailiary of Cunningham, and was made chamberlain of the town of Irvine. The former grant gave rise to a long chronic feud between the Montgomeries and the Cunninghams, earls of Glencairn.

Montgomerie was created Earl of Eglinton between the 3 and 20 January 1506. He was one of those peers who after the Battle of Flodden, 9 September 1513, at which James IV was slain, met at Perth to arrange for the coronation of the infant prince, James V, and was nominated one of the guardians of the prince. On 28 October 1515, he was made keeper of the isle of Little Cumbrae, for the preservation of the game, until the king came of age. On 2 February 1526 – 1527 he was appointed justice-general of the northern parts of Scotland. He was one of the lords who attended the council of the king at Stirling in June 1528, after the young king's escape from the Douglases. In November of the same year, his house of Eglinton was burnt down by William Cunningham, 4th Earl of Glencairn, and the charters of his lands having been all destroyed, the king granted him a new charter dated 23 January 1528-9.

On 18 August 1533, Patrick Hepburn, 3rd Earl of Bothwell, Lord High Admiral of Scotland, appointed him admiral-depute within the bounds of Cunningham. During the absence of the king in France in 1536, to bring home his bride, the Princess Magdalen, he acted as one of the council of regency.

He died in June 1545, and was succeeded in the earldom by his grandson, Hugh Montgomerie, 2nd Earl of Eglinton (died 1546).

== Family ==
By his wife Helen, third daughter of Colin Campbell, 1st Earl of Argyll, he had six sons and seven daughters:

- Alexander, master of Montgomerie, who died young;
- John, lord Montgomerie, killed in the skirmish in the High Street of Edinburgh called 'Cleanse the Causeway,' 2 May 1520, and father of Hugh, 2nd Earl of Eglinton;
- Sir Neil of Langshaw (Lainshaw);
- William of Greenfield;
- Hugh, killed at the battle of Pinkie in 1547;
- Robert, first rector of Kirkmichael, and afterwards bishop of Argyll;
- Margaret, married to William Sempill, 2nd Lord Sempill
- Maud, married to Colin Campbell of Ardkinglas
- Isobel, married to John Mure of Caldwell;
- Elizabeth, married to John Blair of that ilk;
- Agnes, married to John Ker of Kersland;
- Janet, married to Campbell of Cessnock;
- Catherine, married to George Montgomerie of Skelmorlie.

== Notes ==
Attribution

- This article incorporates text from a publication now in the public domain: Henderson, Thomas Finlayson (1894). "Montgomerie, Hugh (1460?-1545)". In Lee, Sidney (ed.). Dictionary of National Biography. Vol. 38. London: Smith, Elder & Co.

Peerage of Scotland
New creation	Earl of Eglinton; 1507–1545	Succeeded by Hugh Montgomerie
Preceded by Alexander Montgomerie	Lord Montgomerie c.1470–1545	Succeeded by Hugh Montgomerie
