= Archibald Montgomerie =

Archibald Montgomerie may refer to:

- Archibald Montgomerie, 11th Earl of Eglinton (1726–1796), Scottish general, and Member of Parliament (MP)
- Archibald Montgomerie, 13th Earl of Eglinton (1812–1861), British Conservative politician
- Archibald Montgomerie, 14th Earl of Eglinton (1841–1892), Scottish noble and member of the House of Lords
- Archibald Montgomerie, 16th Earl of Eglinton (1880–1945)
- Archibald Montgomerie, 17th Earl of Eglinton (1914–1966)
- Archibald Montgomerie, 18th Earl of Eglinton (1939–2018)
