= Archibald Montgomerie, 18th Earl of Eglinton =

British Earl (1939–2018)

The Right Honourable and Much Honoured The Earl of Eglinton
- 18th Earl of Eglinton; 6th Earl of Winton
- Arms of the Earls of Eglinton and Winton
- Tenure: 1966-2018
- Predecessor: 17th Earl of Eglinton and 5th Earl of Winton
- Successor: Hugh Montgomerie
- Other titles: Lord Montgomerie (1945-1966)
- Born: Archibald George Montgomerie; 27 August 1939
- Died: 14 June 2018 (aged 78)
- Residence: Balhomie, near Cargill, Perthshire, Scotland
- Offices: Chief of Clan Montgomery
- Spouse: Marion née Dunn-Yarker (m. 1964)
- Issue: Hugh Montgomerie, 19th Earl of Eglinton; Hon. William Montgomerie; Hon. James Montgomerie; Hon. Robert Montgomerie
- Parents: Archibald Montgomerie, 17th Earl of Eglinton; Ursula Watson
- Occupation: Business executive (retired)

Archibald George Montgomerie, 18th Earl of Eglinton and 6th Earl of Winton (27 August 1939 – 14 June 2018), styled Lord Montgomerie until 1966, was the son of Archibald William Alexander Montgomerie, 17th Earl of Eglinton, and Ursula Joan Watson.

== Career ==
Lord Eglinton was educated at Eton and went on to a career in the City of London as a member of the London Stock Exchange.

He joined the stockbrokers Grieveson Grant, where he became senior dealer in the fixed interest market, with a focus on short-dated gilts, and by the age of 24 was a partner in the firm, remaining in post from 1957 to 1972. He then joined another firm, Gerrard and National, as managing director, and was also deputy chairman by 1980. This firm was merged into Gerrard Vivian Gray, of which he was chairman from 1992 to 1994. He then moved on to be chairman of the Edinburgh Investment Trust PLC and was a director of other investment trusts, including Hong Kong Investment Trust and Dunedin Income Growth Fund.

== Marriage and issue ==
He married Marion Carolina Dunn-Yarker, daughter of John Henry Dunn-Yarker and Elizabeth Adrienne Pinching, on 7 February 1964. They have four sons:

- Hugh Archibald William Montgomerie, 19th Earl of Eglinton (born 24 July 1966); married twice and has a son
- Hon. William John Montgomerie (born 4 October 1968); married with issue
- Hon. James David Montgomerie (born 1972); married with issue
- Hon. Robert Seton Montgomerie (born 1975)

The Countess is a Patroness of the Royal Caledonian Ball. The family seat is at Balhomie House, near Cargill, in Perthshire.

== Freemasonry ==
Eglinton was initiated into freemasonry in Lodge Mother Kilwinning No. 0, under the Grand Lodge of Scotland. He subsequently joined United Lodge of Prudence No.83 under the United Grand Lodge of England, and was appointed Senior Grand Warden in 1971, and served as Assistant Grand Master from 1989 until 1995.

== Ancestry ==
Ancestors of Archibald Montgomerie, 18th Earl of Eglinton

16. Archibald Montgomerie, 13th Earl of Eglinton
8. George Montgomerie, 15th Earl of Eglinton
17. Theresa Newcomen
4. Archibald Montgomerie, 16th Earl of Eglinton
18. Boyd Cuninghame
9. Janet Cuninghame
19. Mary Wilkinson
2. Archibald Montgomerie, 17th Earl of Eglinton
20. John Dalrymple, 10th Earl of Stair
10. John Dalrymple, 11th Earl of Stair
21. Jeanne Henriette de Franquetot
5. Lady Beatrice Dalrymple
22. Sir James Grant-Suttie, 6th Baronet
11. Susan Grant-Suttie
23. Lady Susan Innes-Ker
1. Archibald Montgomerie, 18th Earl of Eglinton
24. Thomas Watson
12. William Watson, Baron Watson
25. Eleanora McHaffe
6. Hon. Ronald Watson
26. Dugald Bannatyne
13. Margaret Bannatyne
3. Ursula Watson

== See also ==
- Eglinton Castle

Peerage of Scotland
Preceded by Archibald Montgomerie	Earl of Eglinton; 1966–2018	Succeeded by Hugh Montgomerie
Peerage of the United Kingdom
Preceded by Archibald Montgomerie	Earl of Winton; 1966–2018	Succeeded by Hugh Montgomerie
