= Archibald Montgomery =

Archibald Montgomery may refer to:

- Archibald Montgomery-Massingberd (1871−1947), British Army officer
- Archie Montgomery (1873−1922), Scottish footballer

== See also ==
- Archibald Montgomerie
