= Murder of Hugh Montgomerie =

1586 murder in Scotland

Murder of Hugh Montgomerie, 4th Earl of Eglinton
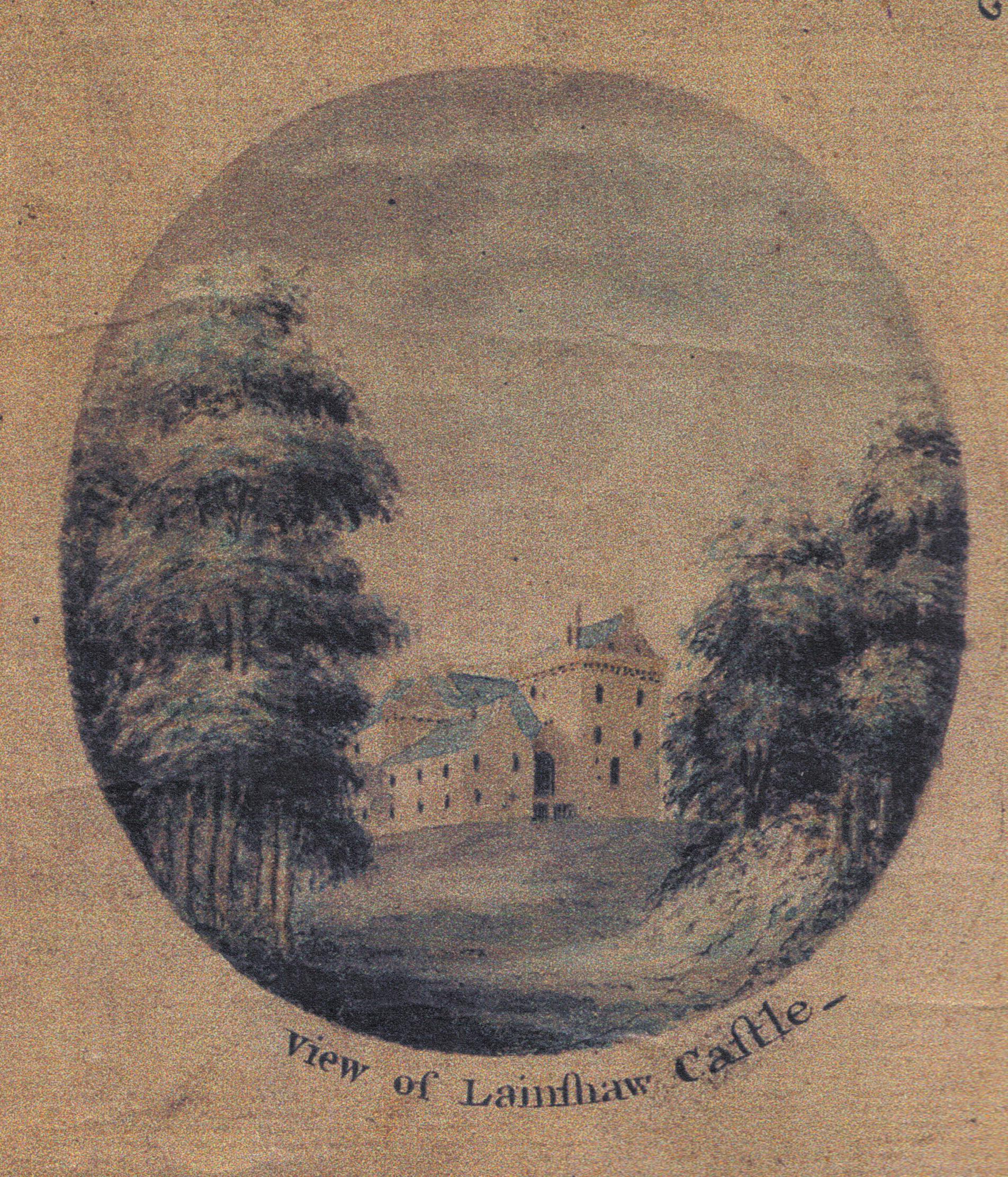
- Lainshaw Castle in the 17th century
- Born: 1563
- Died: 1586 (aged 22–23); Annick Ford, Stewarton
- Cause of death: Blood loss due to bullet wound and multiple stabbings
- Resting place: Kilwinning Abbey
- Citizenship: British
- Occupations: Landowner and Scottish peer
- Parent(s): Hugh Montgomerie, 3rd Earl of Eglinton and Agnes Drummond of Inchpeffrey

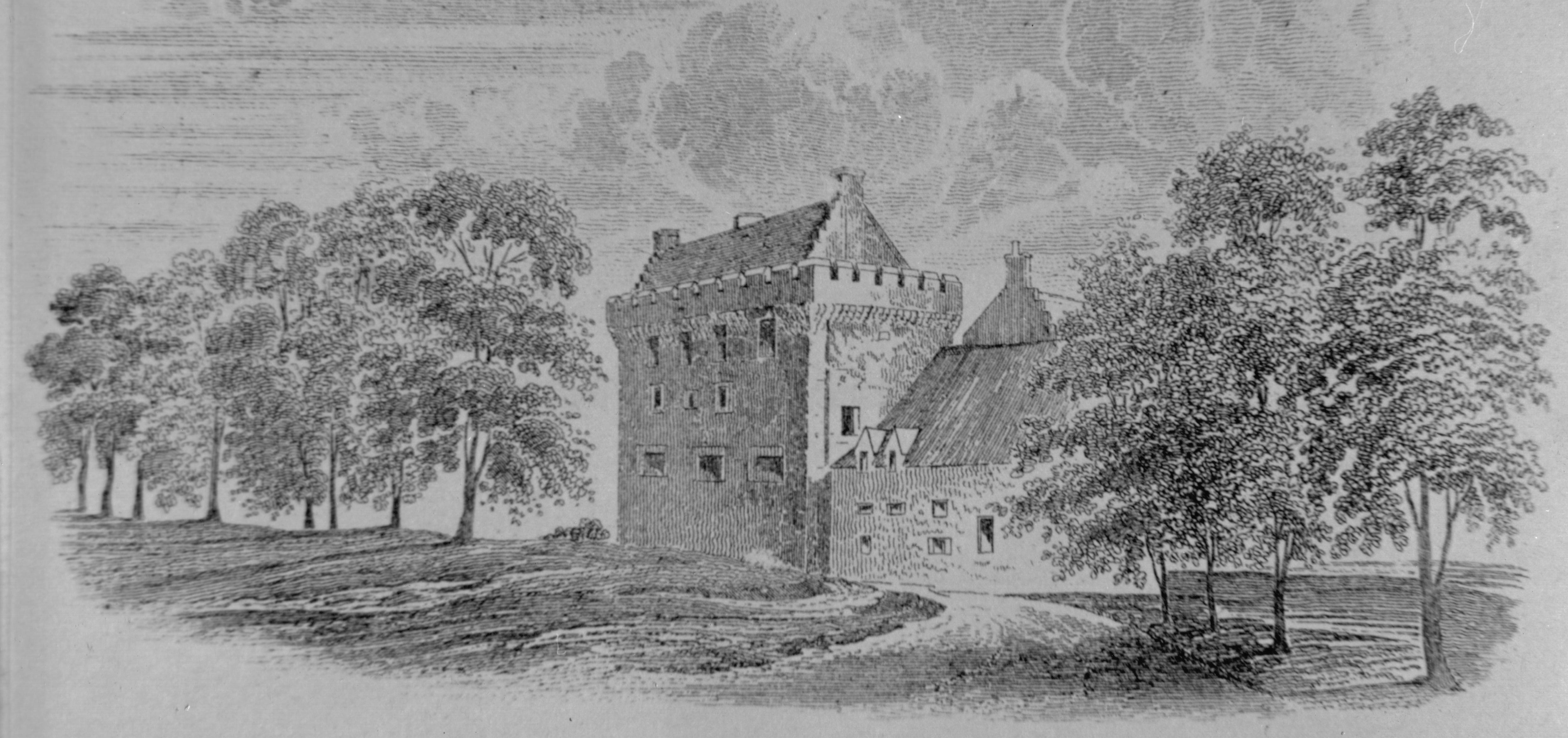
Eglinton Castle

The Murder of Hugh Montgomerie, 4th Earl of Eglinton at the Annick Ford in Stewarton, East Ayrshire, Scotland, took place in 1586 as a consequence of a long running feud between the Montgomeries, Earls of Eglinton and the Cunninghames, Earls of Glencairn, families who were competing for power and influence locally and nationally. The significant repercussions of this act were felt throughout the county of Ayrshire and beyond. The spelling 'Montgomerie' is used throughout for both the family and Montgomery for the clan and clan and district names 'Cunninghame' in the same fashion.

== Historical background ==
The Baillieship of Cunninghame had long been in the hands of the Cunninghames, Earls of Glencairn, however at around the date 1448 the Crown conferred the Baillieship on the head of the House of Montgomerie (de Mon' Gubri), Earls of Eglinton. This act inevitably caused resentment and resulted in a bloody feud that ran on for centuries. At one point Kerelaw Castle was burned and the Earl of Glencairn retaliated by burning Eglinton Castle although the Earl of Eglinton had escaped to Ardrossan Castle, an impressive fortress until comparatively recent times when Oliver Cromwell had much of its stonework removed and shipped to Ayr to build his new fort. Edward Cunninghame of Auchenharvie was slain in 1526 and Archibald Cunninghame of Waterstoun in 1528.

== The murder ==
The 1764 coat of arms of the Montgomeries, Earls of Eglinton.

On 18 April 1586, Hugh Montgomerie, 4th Earl of Eglinton, aged twenty-four, was travelling to Stirling to join the court having been commanded to attend by the King, accompanied only by a few domestic servants. He stopped at Lainshaw Castle to dine with his close relative, Neil Montgomerie, who was Lord of Lainshaw and whose Lady was an Elizabeth Cunninghame of Aiket, with sisters married to John Cunninghame of Corsehill and David Cunningham of Robertland. It seems that a plot to kill the Earl as an act of revenge had been organised and the Lady, or some say a servant girl who was also a Cunninghame, climbed to the battlements after the meal to hang out a white table napkin and thereby spring the plot. Thirty Cunninghames attacked the Earl at the Bridgend Ford and cut his servants to pieces with swords and other weapons, the Earl himself being finally dispatched with a single shot from the pistol of John Cunninghame of Clonbeith Castle. His horse carried his dead body along the side of the river, still known as the 'Weeping', 'Mourning' or 'Widows' path. Kerr, with local knowledge, states that the site of the crime was recently (1936) built over by a factory, so the site of the ford in question could not have been at the entrance to the Lainshaw Estate at David Dale Avenue, but at the Bridgend Ford instead.

Upon the death of the 5th Earl of Eglinton the title passed to a cousin, Sir Alexander Seton. The main representation of the Montgomerie line therefore passed to the Lainshaw line and then to the Cockilbie branch.

== Aftermath ==
The murdered Earl was eventually taken to Lainshaw Castle, but in the meantime a wave of bloody revenge swept over the district of Cunninghame and elsewhere. Cunninghame friends, relatives and adherents were killed with little or no restraint.

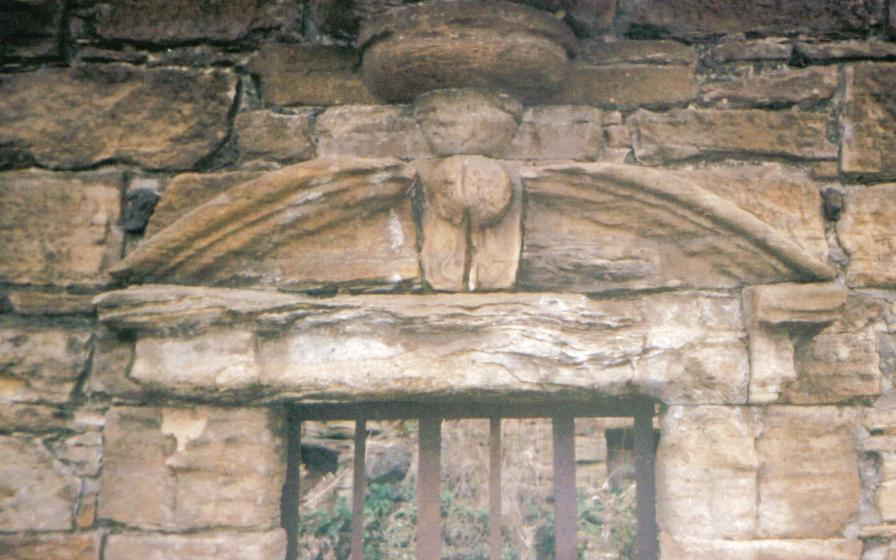
The front entrance of Clonbeith Castle with the date 1617 carved above.

The Earl of Glencairn showed his lack of involvement by taking no action against the Montgomeries and by leaving his kinsmen to the full weight of the law. Aiket was killed near his home; Robertland and Corsehill escaped to Denmark. Clonbeith was traced to a house in Hamilton, possibly Hamilton Palace and hacked to pieces by Robert Montgomerie and John Pollock of that Ilk. Clonbeith had hid within a chimney Both Robertland and Corsehill were pardoned on the insistence of Queen Anne of Denmark upon her marriage to King James VI of Scotland, despite his earlier vow to bring them to justice. Robertland was employed as one of her Majesty's master stablers. The properties of the guilty parties had been confiscated and given to the Montgomeries, however the estates were eventually returned in ruinous condition.

Lady Elizabeth Montgomerie was said to have fled to Ireland, however it seems that she remained close by, living with an estate tenant, one Robert Barr and family at Pearce Bank (Peacockbank) farm, now High Peacockbank. She was eventually permitted to return to her husband and home, however she never again left the grounds of Lainshaw Castle and she avoided any contact with the Montgomerie family for the remainder of her days.

Alexander Cunninghame, the Commendator of Kilwinning Abbey, was shot and killed at his gate at Montgreenan by Sir Robert Montgomerie of Skelmorlie (better known for building the Skelmorlie Aisle as his burial place) on 1 August 1591, as a direct result of the assassination of the Fourth Earl of Eglinton at Stewarton in April of that year.

Lady Elizabeth Montgomerie's ghost is said to haunt Lainshaw Castle, wandering the corridors wearing a green dress and carrying a candle.

== Other versions of the murder ==
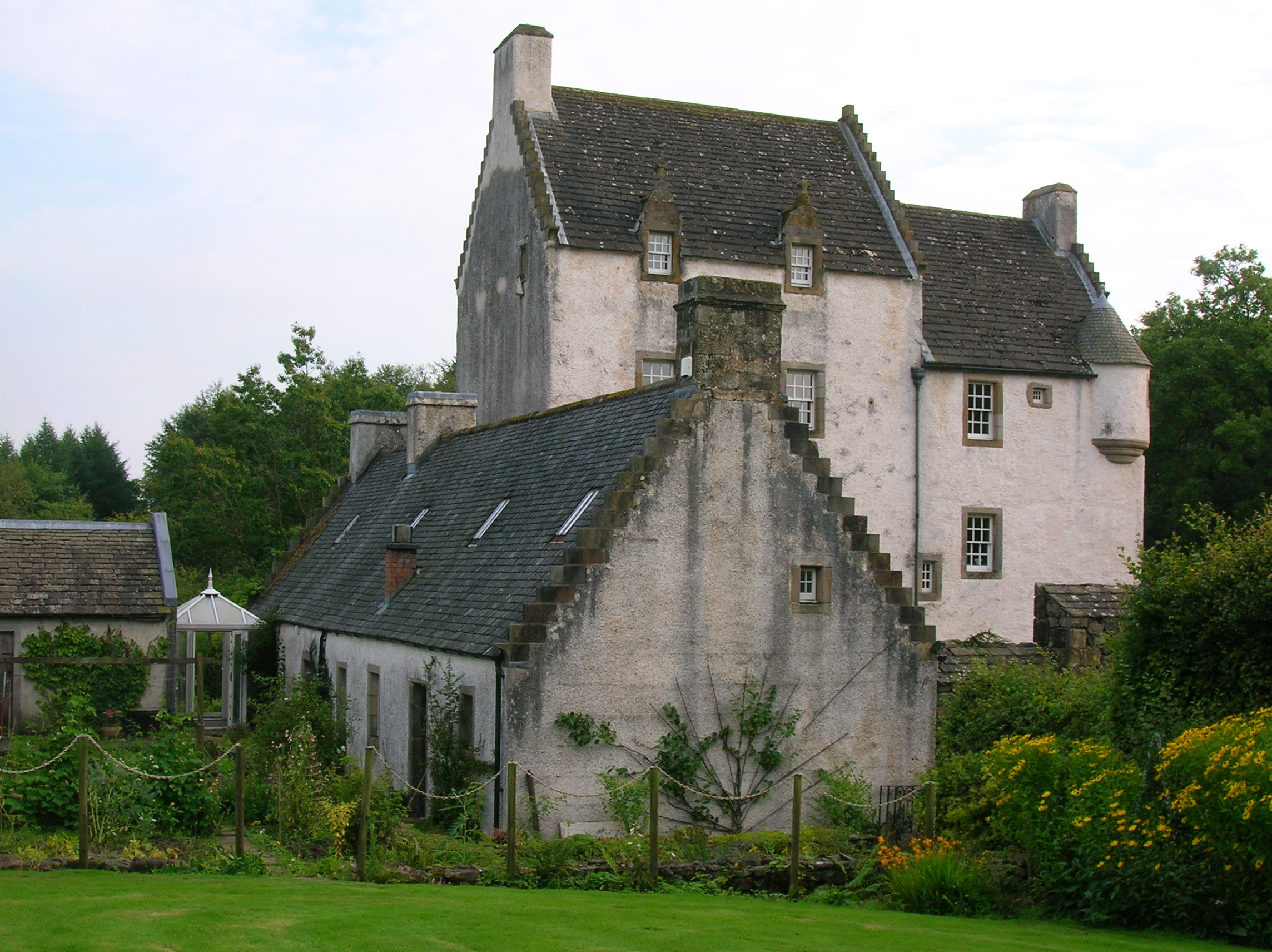
Aiket Castle, home to Lady Montgomerie of Lainshaw.

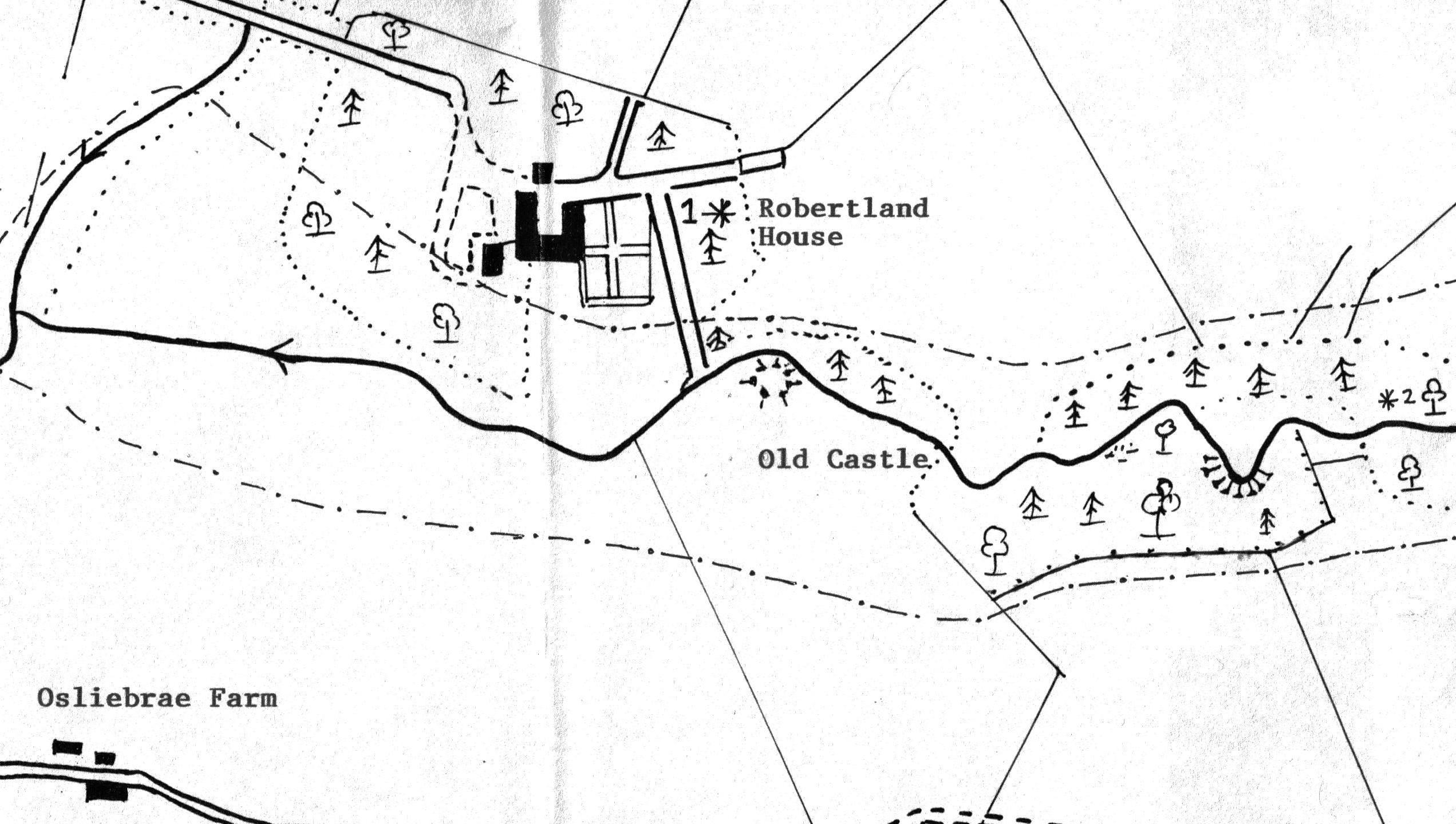
A map of Robertland

William Robertson relates a very different tale, taken from the chronicle known as the Historie of King James the Sext, that Cunninghame of Robertland spent two years developing a friendship with Hugh and despite warnings from Hugo, third Earl, eventually Hugh held Robertland in high esteem and close friendship, giving the opportunity for him to be caught off guard and cut down when attacked by sixty Cunninghame horseman. His servants had all left him to his fate. The site of this action is not recorded. Blair gives this version as well, stating that Cunninghame of Robertland was 'a very dear friend' and loved Earl Hugh 'as his own bedfellow'.

Chambers has Cunninghame of Robertland as the leading person in the affair, recording that "The Cunninghams, being grieved hereat, made presently a vow that they should be avenged upon the fattest of the Montgomeries for that fact."' The perpetrators all escaped unharmed 'beyond sea', but their lands and castles were awarded to the Earl's brother 'either to be demolished or otherwise'. Robertland himself fled to Denmark and was eventually pardoned by the King and returned to Scotland as her majesty's master stabler. The Earl was on no special journey and the Lady of Lainshaw is not mentioned in this version.

George Robertson gives yet another, 'traditional' version, in which Cunninghame of Clonbeith is stated as being at best an accessory, although he is still caught and killed in Hamilton. Here the Earl is on his way to a visit to the laird of Robertland Castle, but stops first for a meal at Lainshaw. The Laird of Lainshaw tries to dissuade him from continuing his journey, but to no avail and on his way back from Robertland he is met and murdered by Cunninghame of Aiket at a place called the Windy-path in Stewarton. He was shot and although dying he was able to stay in the saddle until he reached the Annick Ford where he fell from his horse and expired immediately. The Windy-path has been called the Mourning-path since that day. The date of this event is given as 12-05-1589, a date that does not fit with the 1586 date of the first version given.

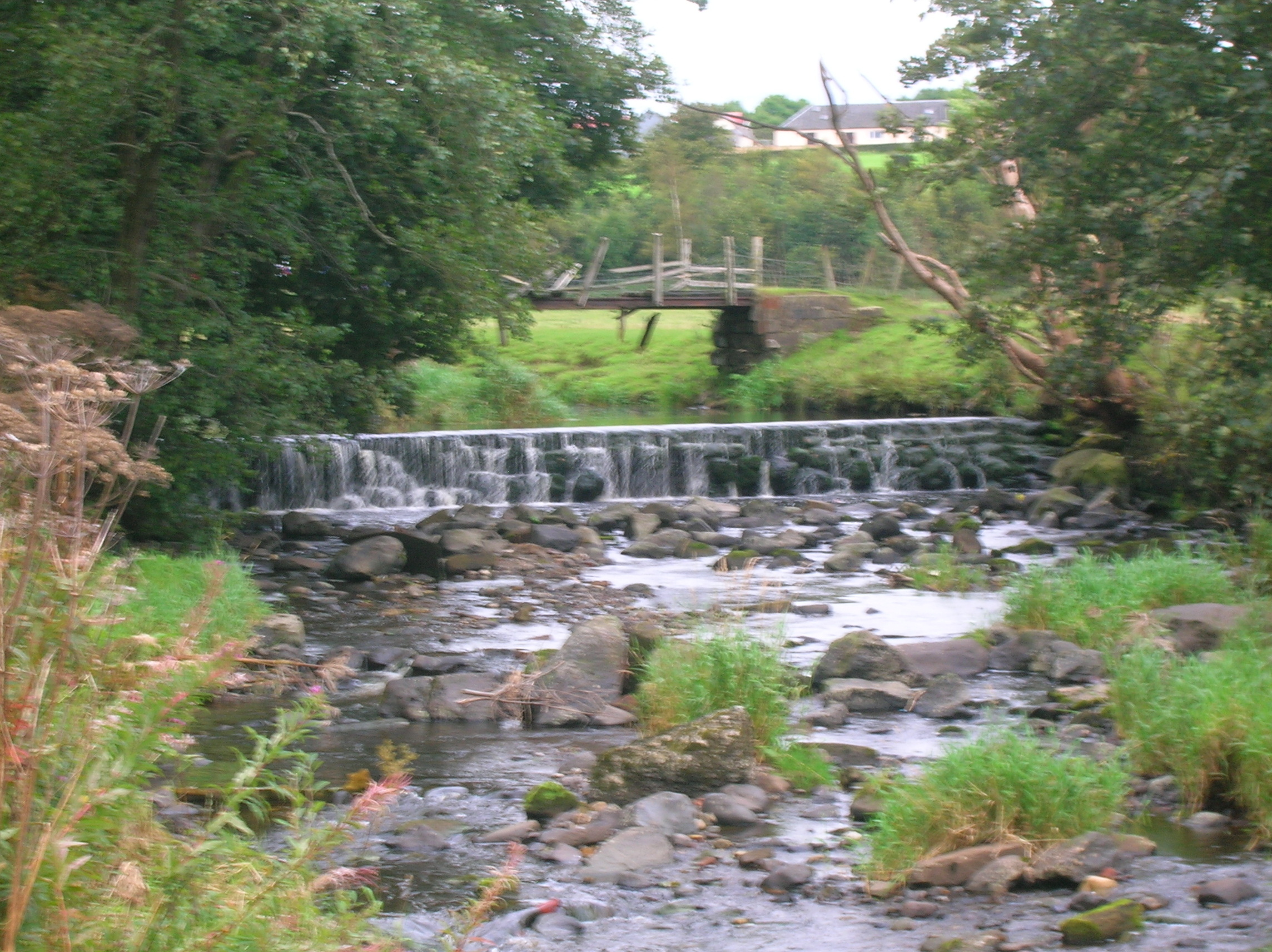
The bridge and weir on the Annick Water below Lainshaw House.

Steven states that "The ruins, nearly levelled by the hand of time, of the Castle of Robertland formerly stronghold of the Cunninghames, Baronets of Robertland, are situated behind the modern mansion of Alexander Kerr, esq. of Robertland. this stronghold, it is say, was destroyed by fire in a feud between the Montgomeries of Eglinton and the Cunninghames; in revenge for which, one of the Cunninghames shot the chief of the Eglintons, while riding home, near to Bridgend, at the east end of the town of Stewarton, where a path is still shown, called the " Weeping Path,"along which he rode, until he came to the ford of the Annock, at Bridgend in Stewarton, where he fell dead off his horse. This took place on 12 April 1586. in the person of Hugh, fourth Earl of Eglinton."

MacGachen (1844) gives a confused version in the second collection of prose and verse named the 'Ayrshire Wreath'. The action in this version takes place at the 'Bridge of Annock', erroneously located over the Carmel Burn that is actually located in the Kilmaurs area. The Earl's manservant is wittily named as 'Archie Mucledrouth' and Cunninghame of Aiket is stated to have fired the fatal shot and as having been hunted down and 'cut to pieces' in Hamilton. Many of the Earl's retainers are said to have been killed, the 'stream' running red with their blood, giving a fisherman, a maiden and some children a nasty shock. Otherwise the story is much the same as the Robertson version.

The authors Reilly and Metcalfe have a very different version and state that the earl was on his way from Polnone (Polnoon near Eaglesham) to tryst at Stirling, having travelled about six miles before being attacked and shot by the lairds of Robertland and Aiket, as well as other Cunninghames; no mention is made of the Montgomerie's of Lainshaw.

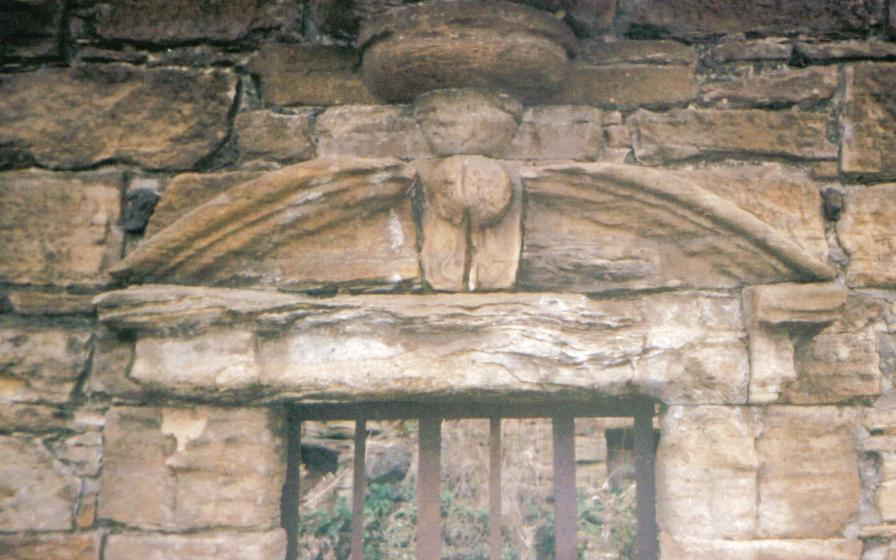
The front entrance of Clonbeith Castle with the date 1617 carved above.

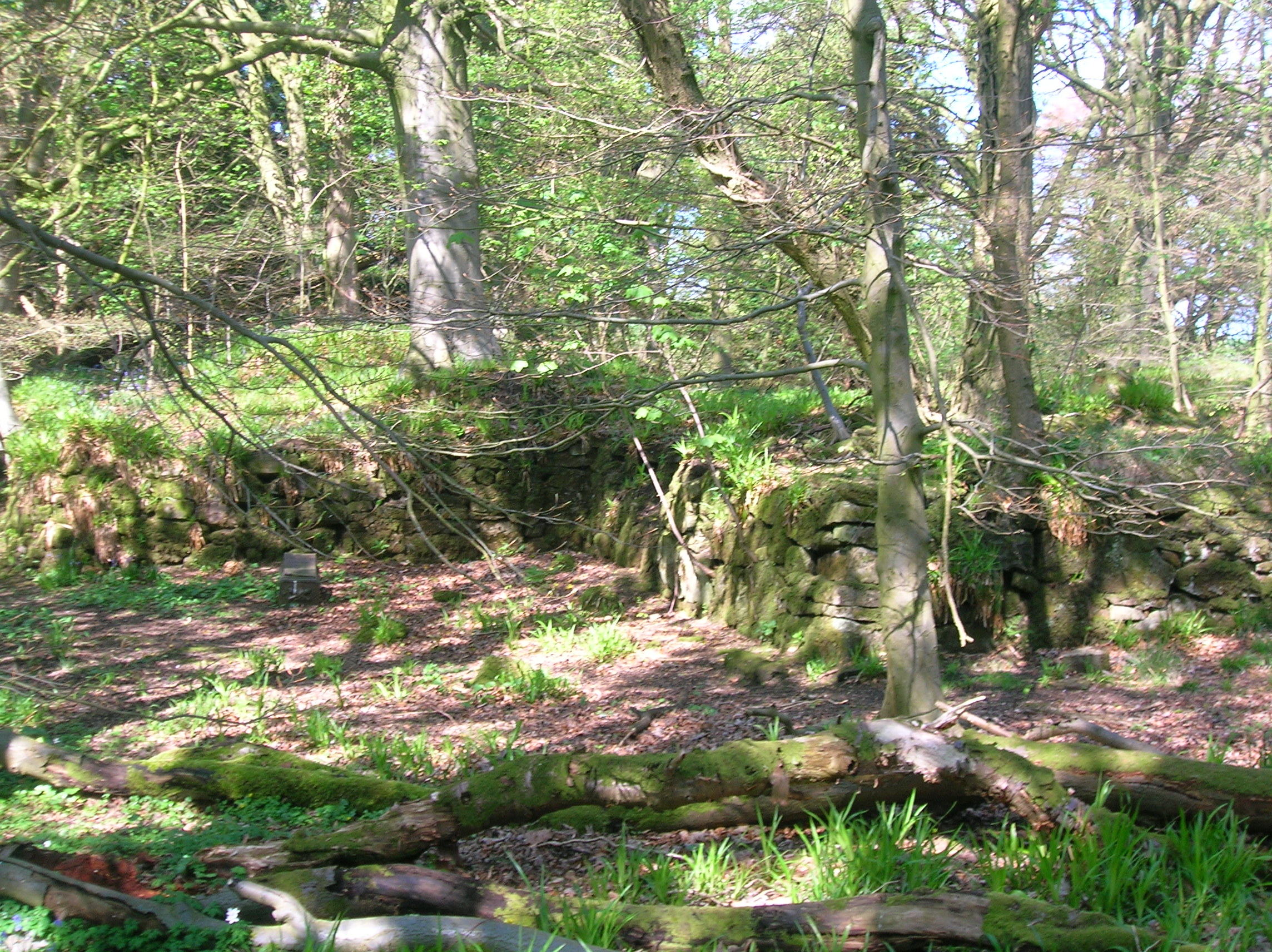
Montgreenan Castle or the Bishop's Palace.

Fullarton states that the murder was planned by the Earl of Glencairn and that Hugh was most cruelly, shamefully, and unmercifully murdered and slain by John Cunninghame of Reis (brother to the Earl of Glencairn); Alexander Cunninghame (brother of Cunninghame of Polquharne); John Cunninghame (servant to John Cunninghame); David Cunninghame of Robertland; Andrew Arnot of Lochrig; Robert Cunninghame of Kirkland; Alexander Cunninghame of Aiket; William Cunninghame of Aiket; Patrick Cunninghame of Bordland; Abraham Cunninghame (bastard son of Alexander of Clonbeith); John Reyburn of that Ilk; Patrick Cunninghame of Corsehill; John Cunninghame of Clonbeith; Mungo Mure of Rowallan; Alan Foulis in Fulshaw; David Maxwell of Kilmacolm; John Maxwell of Kilmacolm; John Brown in Gateside; David Fulton in Robertland; John Henry in Little Cutstraw; Robert Dick in Crockford; Robert Henry in Robertland; John Hart (servant to David of Robertland); Hugh White (servant to John of Clonbeith); Gilbert Dunlop (servant of Patrick of Baidland); Alexander Speir in Brome; and John Wylie in Roughside.

McNaught records that a John Cunninghame, son of Patrick Cunninghame of Kirkland was a party to the murder.

== See also ==
- Aiket Castle
- Clonbeith Castle
- Lainshaw Castle
- Castle and Barony of Robertland
- Skelmorlie Castle
