= Hugh Montgomerie, 19th Earl of Eglinton =

Scottish nobleman

Hugh Archibald William Montgomerie, 19th Earl of Eglinton, 7th Earl of Winton (born 24 July 1966) is a Scottish peer, landowner, businessman, Sheriff of Renfrewshire, and chief of Clan Montgomery. From birth until 2018, he was known by the courtesy title of Lord Montgomerie.

Born in Hammersmith, the eldest of the four sons of Archibald Montgomerie, 18th Earl of Eglinton, and his wife Marion Carolina Dunn-Yarker, Montgomerie was educated at Eton College and served as an officer of the Royal Navy from 1988 to 1993, after which he became a shipping operations manager. Having been a Sub-Lieutenant in the navy, in February 1994 he was commissioned as a Lieutenant into the Intelligence Corps of the Territorial Army. In April 2000, he transferred to the Regular Army Reserve of Officers.

Arms of the Earls of Eglinton and Winton

In the late 1990s, he attended the University of Edinburgh, graduating MBA in 1999. From 2004 to 2020 he was an executive of Dell Technologies, based in Nashville, Tennessee.

On 14 June 2018 Montgomerie succeeded his father as Earl of Eglinton (1507), Earl of Winton (1859), Lord Montgomerie (1445), and Baron Ardrossan (1806). At the time of his father's death, the family seat was at Balhomie House, near Cargill, Perthshire, but this was sold in 2019.

As well as serving as Sheriff of Renfrewshire, he is chief of Clan Montgomery. The first of the name in Scotland was Robert of Montgomerie, who was granted the estate of Eaglesham in Renfrewshire in the reign of King David I (1124–1153). His father had held the Castle of Sainte-Foy-de-Montgommery near Lisieux in Normandy and had come into England with William the Conqueror.

Eglinton has been a member of the Standing Council of Scottish Chiefs since 2018 and is also the chairman of the Society of Scottish Armigers.

On 19 December 1991, Montgomerie married firstly Sara Alexandra Redpath. They were divorced in 1998. On 28 July 2001 he married secondly Carol Anne Robinson and with her has three children:

- Lady Helena Montgomerie (born 2003)
- Lady Beatrice Montgomerie (born 2005)
- Rhuridh Seton Archibald Montgomerie, Lord Montgomerie (born 2007).

In 2020, after leaving Dell, Eglinton settled at Moffat in Dumfries and Galloway.

== See also ==
- Eglinton Castle

Peerage of Scotland
Preceded by Archibald Montgomerie	Earl of Eglinton; 2018–present	Succeeded by Incumbent
Peerage of the United Kingdom
Preceded by Archibald Montgomerie	Earl of Winton; 2018–present	Succeeded by Incumbent
