= Hugh Montgomerie, 3rd Earl of Eglinton =

Scottish aristocrat and strong supporter of Mary Queen of Scots

Hugh Montgomerie, 3rd Earl of Eglinton (c. 1531 – 1585) was a Scottish aristocrat who was a strong supporter of Mary Queen of Scots. He was an important participant in a tumultuous period of Scottish history.

== Early years ==
Born in 1531, Montgomerie was the great-grandson of Hugh Montgomerie, 1st Earl of Eglinton. He attended St. Mary's College, St. Andrews in 1552. Soon after, Montgomerie married Janet Hamilton, the daughter of James Hamilton, then First Earl of Aran.

Although Montgomerie was a Catholic, In October 1559, Montgomery brought forces to Edinburgh to support Hamilton and the Scottish Lords of the Congregation against French forces supporting the exiled Mary Stuart and the current Scottish government. In December 1559, Montgomerie renewed his pledge of support.

== Support of Mary ==
However, as a practicing Catholic, Montgomerie was a frequent target of criticism by Protestant clerics, and was said to attend daily mass and had a priest on his personal staff. He soon switched sides to support Mary Stuart. In December 1560, soon after the death of Mary's teenage husband, Francis II of France, Montgomerie signed a pledge of support for her in a meeting at Dunbar Castle. In February 1561, he travelled to France to visit Mary. Hamilton returned with her to Scotland in August 1561, when she assumed the Scottish throne.

On 15 May 1568 Montgomerie joined Mary's forces at the Battle of Langside. After their defeat, he fled the field and spend the night hiding in an outhouse. On 19 August Parliament declared Montgomerie guilty of treason for failing to turn over his castles to the victor. In May 1571 he finally swore allegiance to the Matthew Stewart, 4th Earl of Lennox, the regent for the young king James VI. In September 1571, Montgomerie was with Stewart when he was killed at a skirmish in Stirling. The raiding party, which included the Hamiltons, locked Montgomerie in his quarters under guard.

In 1573, Montgomerie advocated tolerance for Catholics from the latest regent, Morton. In 1578. Morton used his influence to appoint Montgomerie as a Privy Councillor. In 1579, Montgomerie subscribed the order for prosecuting the Hamiltons for their roles in the murders of Mathew Stewart and another regent, James Stewart, 1st Earl of Moray. When Morton fell out of power, Montgomerie served as an assize for Morton's trial in 1581.

== Marriage and issue ==
Montgomerie's first wife was Lady Jean Hamilton, a daughter of Regent Arran and Margaret Douglas. The Montgomeries had the marriage dissolved in 1562 and the couple had no children. Lady Jean died on 18 December 1596 and was buried in Trinity College Kirk in Edinburgh. Like many aristocrats she had lent a large sum of money, 11,000 merks, to the goldsmith and financier Thomas Foulis and merchant Robert Jousie. Her will mentions woollen and Irish stitch coverlets and blankets of her "own making".

That same year, Montgomerie married Agnes Drummond daughter of Sir John Drummond of Innerpeffray and Monzie Castle, (a granddaughter of James IV of Scotland). The couple had the following children:

- Hugh Montgomerie, 4th Earl of Eglinton
- Robert Montgomerie of Giffen
- Margaret Montgomerie, married Robert Seton, 1st Earl of Winton
- Agnes Montgomerie, married Robert Sempill, 4th Lord Sempill

== Notes ==
Peerage of Scotland
Preceded by Hugh Montgomerie	Earl of Eglinton; 1546–1585	Succeeded by Hugh Montgomerie
