= Alexander Cunningham of Aiket =

Scottish landowner

Alexander Cunningham of Aiket (died 1592) was a Scottish landowner.

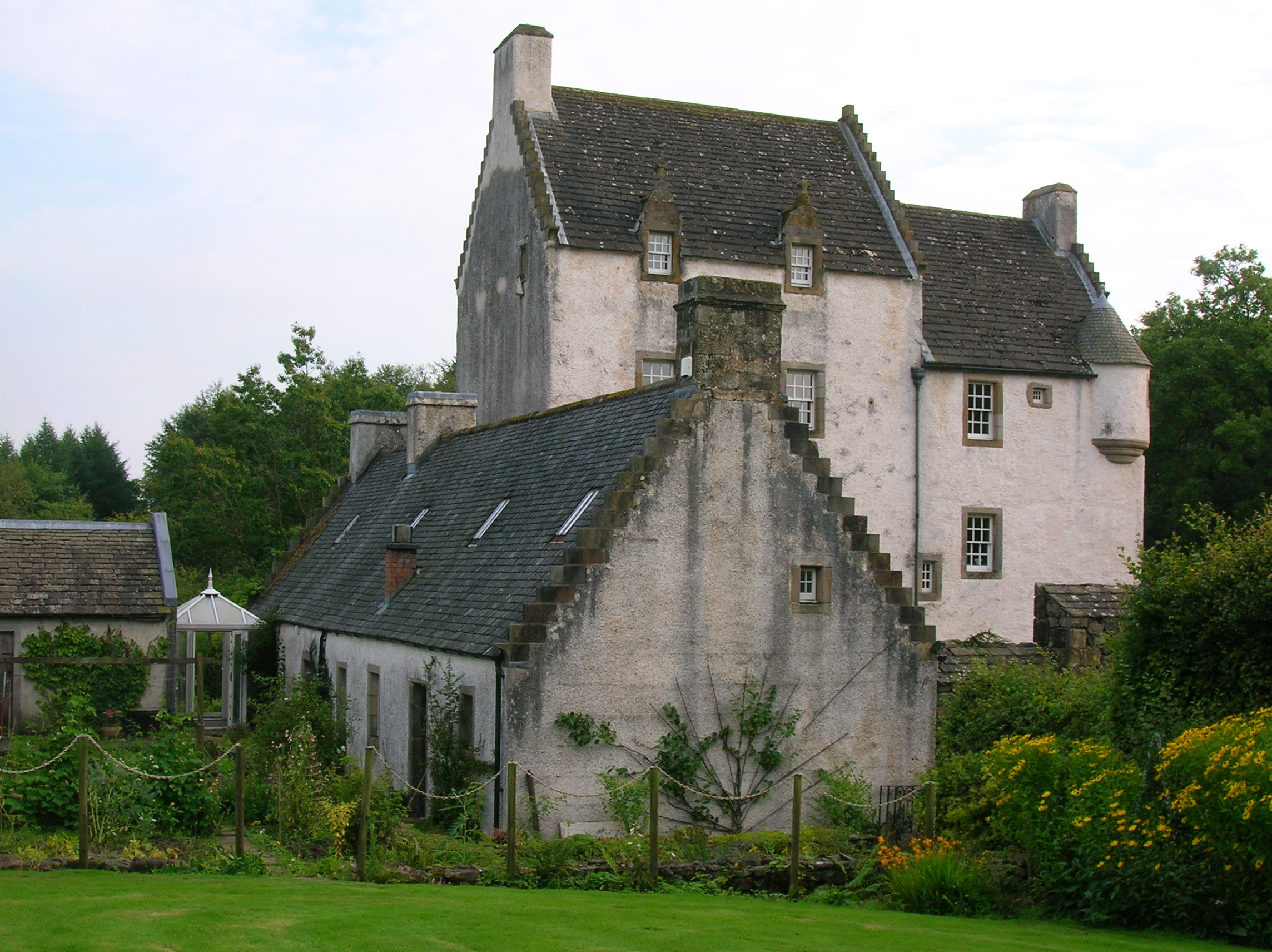
Aiket Castle

He was a son of John Cunningham and Helen Barclay, daughter of the Laird of Corfin. Aiket Castle is in Dunlop parish in Ayrshire.

Alexander Cunningham of Aiket is frequently confused with his uncle or cousin, Alexander Cunningham younger of Aiket, who died before 1570 and was implicated in the murder of John Mure of Caldwell.

Cunningham was involved in the murder of Hugh Montgomerie, 4th Earl of Eglinton on 19 April 1586. It is said that he was killed in revenge soon afterwards near Aiket.

On 13 August 1586 his wife, Dorothea Ross, and other Cunningham victims of the feud, complained to the Privy Council that the Master of Eglinton, Neil Montgomerie of Lainshaw, and others had obtained a commission to apprehend the murderers of the Earl of Eglinton, and had burnt the House of Corsehill, and held the Houses of Robertland and Aiket. Her husband was considered a rebel, and still at large in 1592.

== Marriage and family ==
Cunningham married Dorothea Ross, a daughter of James Ross, 4th Lord Ross and Jean Sempill. Their children included:

- James Cunningham of Aiket
- Margaret Cunningham, who married Neil Montgomerie of Lainshaw
- Jean Cunningham, who married David Cunningham of Robertland, who was involved in the murder of the Earl of Eglinton, subsequently joined the household of Anne of Denmark, and worked as an architect to the crown.
- A daughter who married John Cunningham of Corsehill
- Marion Cunningham (died 1623), who married John Lockhart of Bar in Galston parish.
