= Hugh Montgomerie, 4th Earl of Eglinton =

Scottish landowner

The Right Honourable Hugh Montgomerie
- The Earl of Eglinton
- Coat of arms
- Tenure: 1585–1586
- Predecessor: Hugh Montgomerie, 3rd Earl of Eglinton
- Successor: Hugh Montgomerie, 5th Earl of Eglinton
- Born: 1563
- Died: 1586 (aged 22–23)

Hugh Montgomerie, 4th Earl of Eglinton (1563–1586) was a Scottish landowner.

He was a son of Hugh Montgomerie, 3rd Earl of Eglinton and Agnes Drummond, a daughter of Sir John Drummond of Innerpeffray, (and a granddaughter of James IV of Scotland).

For most of his life he was known as the "Master of Eglinton". The principal home of the family was Eglinton Castle.

His father died in 1585, and his mother Agnes Drummond (d. 1589) married Patrick Drummond, 3rd Lord Drummond.

== Death ==
He was killed at Stewarton on 18 April 1586 by associates of James Cunningham, 7th Earl of Glencairn, including Alexander Cunningham of Aiket.

David Cunningham of Robertland was one of those implicated in the murder. He was said to have joined the Earl's companions two years before the murder. He fled to Denmark and was rehabilitated when James VI of Scotland married Anne of Denmark and joined her household.

== Marriage and family ==
He married Egidia or Gelis Boyd (1556–1586), a daughter of Robert Boyd, 4th Lord Boyd and Marion Colquhoun in 1576. They were to set up household in 1580 when the Master of Eglinton reached sufficient age. Their children included:

- Hugh Montgomerie, 5th Earl of Eglinton

He married secondly Helen Kennedy, daughter of Thomas Kennedy of Bargany.

Peerage of Scotland
Preceded by Hugh Montgomerie	Earl of Eglinton; 1585–1586	Succeeded by Hugh Montgomerie
