= Janet Montgomerie, Countess of Eglinton =

British Red Cross administrator

The Right Honourable The Countess of Eglinton and Winton DBE
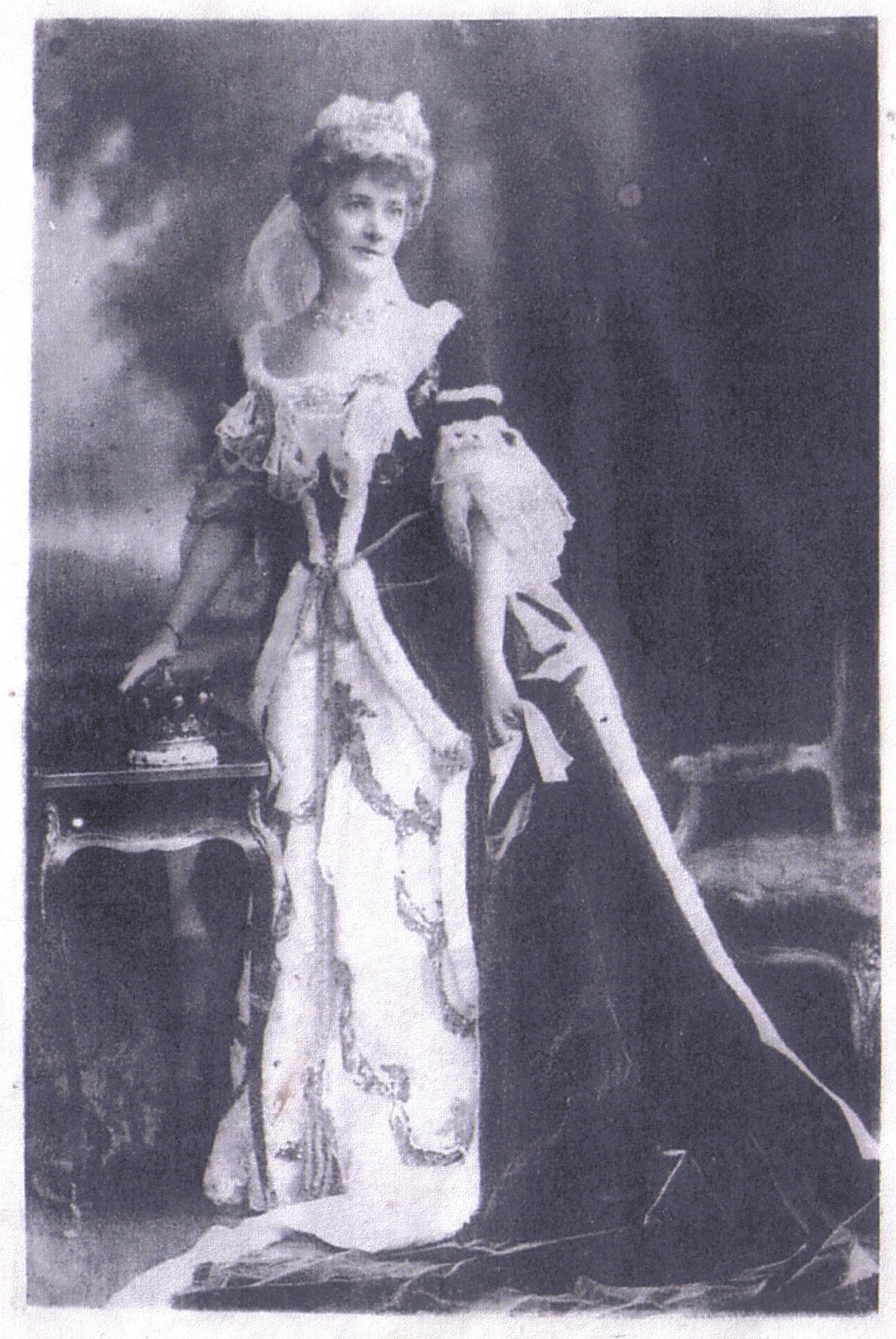
- The Countess of Eglinton
- Born: Janet Lucretia Cuninghame c. 1854; Victoria, Australia
- Died: 6 October 1923 (aged 68–69); Glasgow, Scotland
- Other names: Janet Lucretia Montgomerie
- Spouse: George, Earl of Eglinton and Winton (m. 1873; died 1919)
- Children: Lady Georgiana Montgomerie; Lady Edith Montgomerie; Archibald Montgomerie, 16th Earl of Eglinton; William Alexander Montgomerie; Captain Francis Cuninghame Montgomerie

Janet Lucretia Montgomerie, Countess of Eglinton and Winton, DBE (née Cuninghame; c. 1854 – 6 October 1923) was a British Red Cross administrator and the wife of George Arnulph Montgomerie, 15th Earl of Eglinton.

== Family ==
She was the daughter of Captain Boyd Alexander Cuninghame of the Royal Navy and his Australian wife, Mary (née Wilkinson). She married the Honourable George Montgomerie on 13 November 1873. The couple had several children:

- Lady Georgiana Theresa Montgomerie (d. 21 August 1938)
- Lady Edith Mary Montgomerie (d. 8 September 1947)
- Archibald Seton Montgomerie, 16th Earl of Eglinton (23 June 1880 – 22 April 1945)
- William Alexander Montgomerie (29 October 1881 – 9 May 1903)
- Captain Francis Cuninghame Montgomerie (25 January 1887 – 16 March 1950)

George Montgomerie succeeded his elder brother as 15th Earl in 1892 and died in 1919.

== World War I ==
During the First World War, Lady Eglinton was president of the Ayrshire Branch of the British Red Cross Society and a member of the Scottish War Executive of the Society. For these services she was appointed Dame Commander of the Order of the British Empire (DBE) in the 1920 civilian war honours.
