= Archibald Montgomerie, 17th Earl of Eglinton =

Scottish nobleman

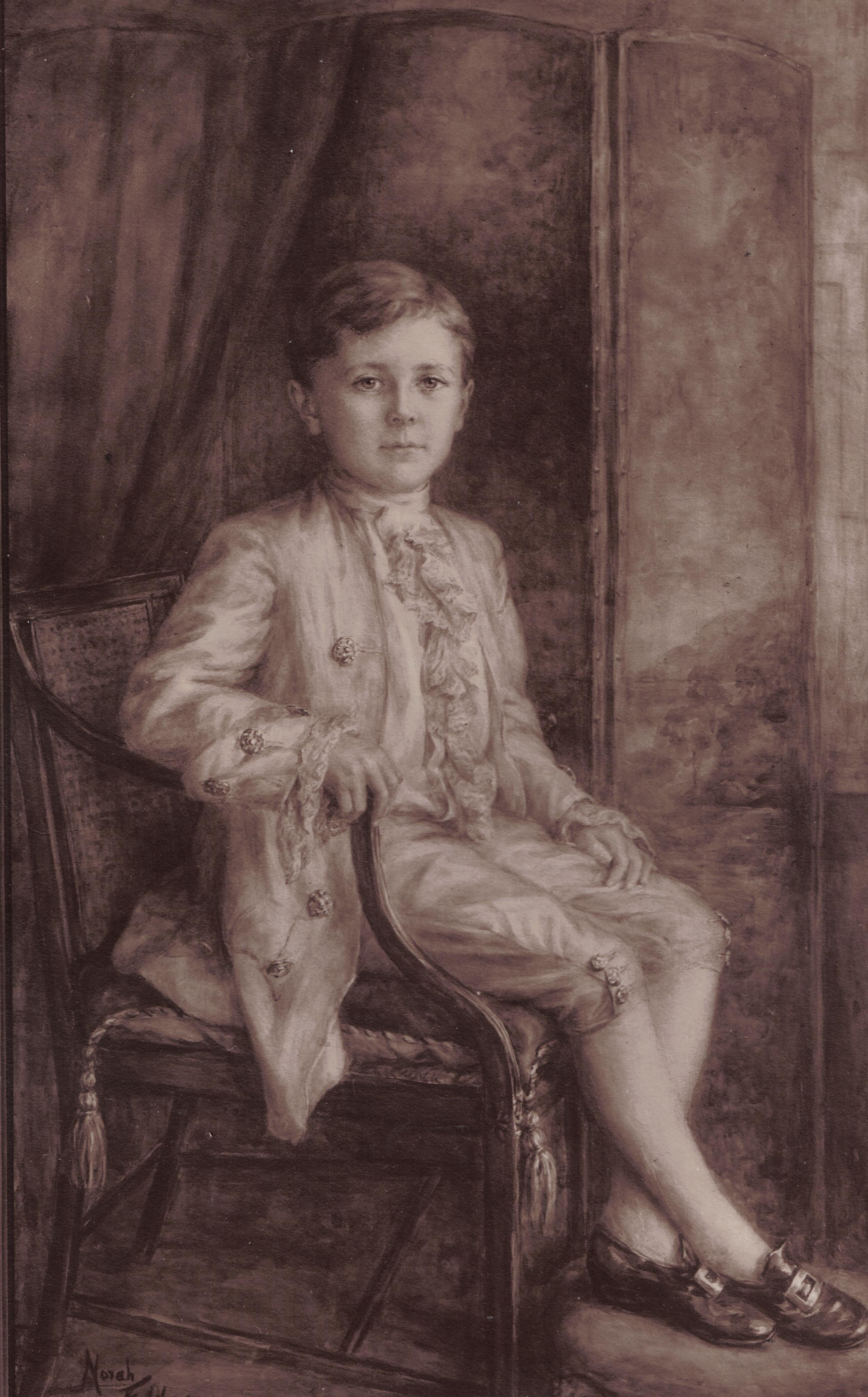
Lord Montgomerie in 1921 from a painting presented by the tenantry of Eglinton estates

Archibald William Alexander Montgomerie, 17th Earl of Eglinton (16 October 1914 – 21 April 1966) was the son of Archibald Montgomerie, 16th Earl of Eglinton.

He was educated at Eton and New College, Oxford.

On 10 November 1938, he married Ursula Joan Watson and they had four children:

- Archibald George Montgomerie, 18th Earl of Eglinton (27 August 1939 – 14 June 2018)
- Susanna Montgomerie (b. 19 October 1941)
- Elizabeth Beatrice Montgomerie (b. 29 August 1945)
- Egida Seton Montgomerie (1945–1957)

== Freemasonry ==
Whilst a student at New College he was Initiated into English Freemasonry in Apollo University Lodge, No.357, (Oxford), in 1936. After completing his education and returning to Scotland he joined Lodge Mother Kilwinning, No.0, in 1947. He served as Master of that Lodge 1949–1957. He also affiliated to Lodge Montgomerie Kilwinning, No.624, (Skelmorlie, North Ayrshire) in 1947 and served as Master for that year. Also in 1949 he was appointed Provincial Grand Master for Ayrshire by the Grand Lodge of Scotland and in capacity 1949–1957 – the same period he was Master of Lodge Mother Kilwinning. His first office in the Grand Lodge of Scotland was as Grand Architect in 1948–1949.

== See also ==
- Eglinton Castle

Masonic offices
| Preceded by The Lord Macdonald of Sleat | Grand Master of the Grand Lodge of Scotland; 1957–1961 | Succeeded by Lord Bruce |
Peerage of Scotland
| Preceded by Archibald Montgomerie | Earl of Eglinton; 1945–1966 | Succeeded by Archibald Montgomerie |
Peerage of the United Kingdom
| Preceded by Archibald Montgomerie | Earl of Winton; 1945–1966 | Succeeded by Archibald Montgomerie |
