= George Montgomerie, 15th Earl of Eglinton =

Scottish peer, landowner and sportsman

External image
- Grave of MONTGOMERIE William Alexander 1881-1903 at the St John's Anglican Church cemetery, Wynberg, Cape Town, South Africa

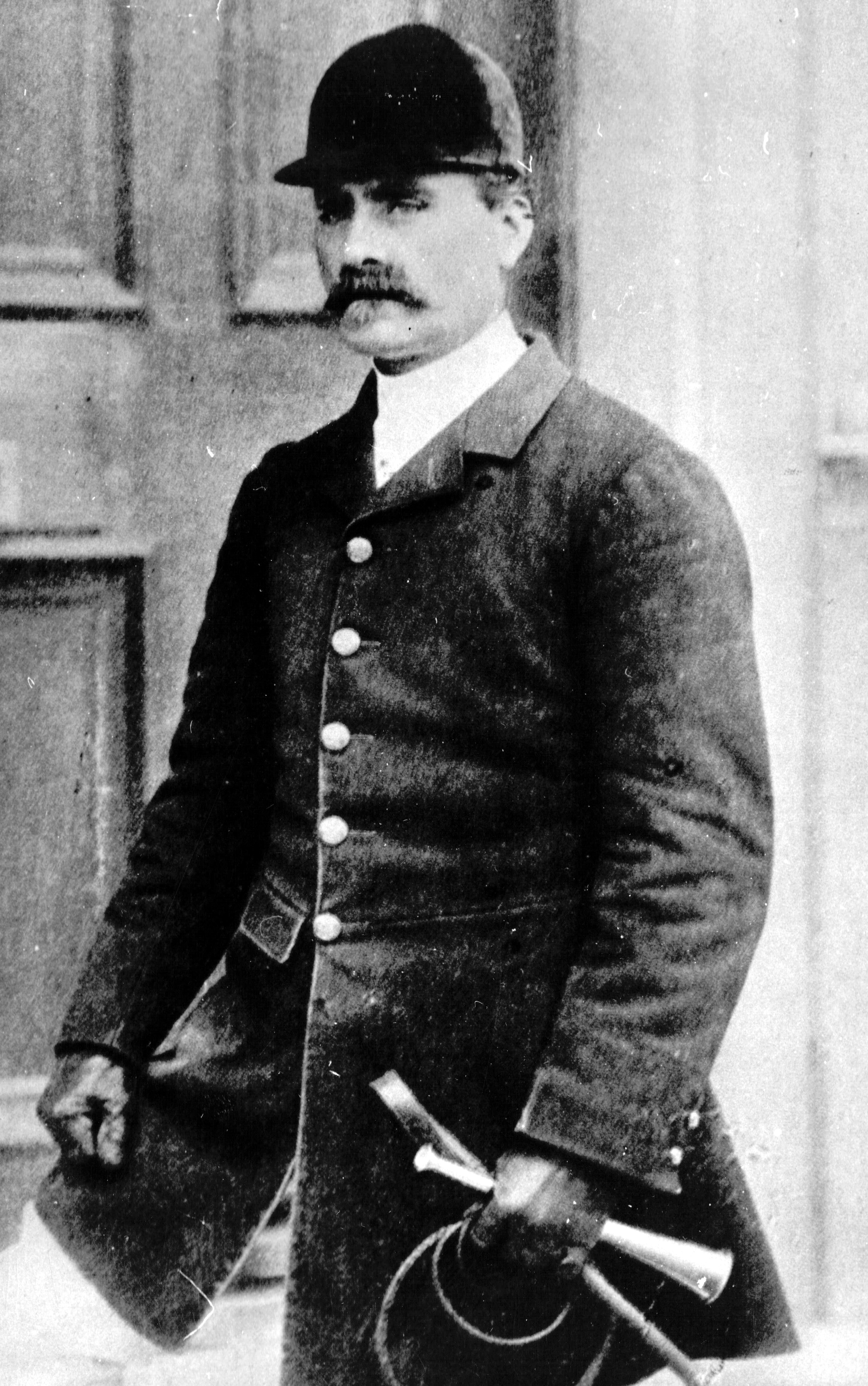
The 15th Earl of Eglinton

George Arnulph Montgomerie, 15th Earl of Eglinton, 3rd Earl of Winton (23 February 1848 – 10 August 1919) was a Scottish peer, landowner and sportsman, the third and youngest son of Archibald Montgomerie, 13th Earl of Eglinton and his first wife, Theresa Newcomen.

== Family ==
Lord Eglinton married Janet Lucretia Cuninghame on 13 November 1873. They had several children:

- Lady Georgiana Theresa Montgomerie (d. 21 August 1938)
- Lady Edith Mary Montgomerie (d. 8 September 1947)
- Archibald Seton Montgomerie, 16th Earl of Eglinton (23 June 1880 – 22 April 1945)
- William Alexander Montgomerie (29 October 1881 – d. 9 May 1903)
- Captain Francis Cuninghame Montgomerie (b. 25 January 1887 – 16 March 1950)

Lord Eglinton died on 10 August 1919, aged 71.

Peerage of Scotland
Preceded by Archibald William Montgomerie	Earl of Eglinton; 1892–1919	Succeeded by Archibald Seton Montgomerie
Peerage of the United Kingdom
Preceded by Archibald William Montgomerie	Earl of Winton; 1892–1919	Succeeded by Archibald Seton Montgomerie
