= Earl of Eglinton =

Scottish peerage title

Earldom of Eglinton
- Blazon Quarterly 1st and 4th grand quarters counterquartered 1st and 4th Azure three fleur-de-lys Or (Montgomerie); 2nd and 3rd Gules three annulets Or stoned Azure (Eglinton), all within a bordure Or charged with a double treasure flory counter-flory Gules; 2nd and 3rd grand quarters counterquartered 1st and 4th Or three crescents within a double treasure flory counterflory Gules (Seton); 2nd and 3rd Azure three garbs Or (Buchan) over all an escutcheon parted per pale Gules and Azure the dexter charged with a sword in pale proper pommelled and billed Or supporting an imperial crown the sinister charged with a star of twelve points Argent, all within a double treasure flory counterflory Gold.
- Creation date: 1507
- Created by: James IV of Scotland
- Peerage: Peerage of Scotland
- First holder: Hugh Montgomerie, 3rd Lord Montgomerie
- Present holder: Hugh Archibald William Montgomerie, 19th Earl of Eglinton, 7th Earl of Winton
- Heir apparent: Rhuridh Seton Archibald Montgomerie, Lord Montgomerie
- Subsidiary titles: Lord Montgomerie
- Former seats: Balhomie House; Eglinton Castle; Skelmorlie Castle

Earl of Eglinton is a title in the Peerage of Scotland. (Note: Some authorities spell the title as Earl of Eglintoun) It was created by James IV of Scotland in 1507 for Hugh Montgomerie, 3rd Lord Montgomerie.

In 1859, the thirteenth Earl of Eglinton, Archibald Montgomerie, was also created Earl of Winton in the Peerage of the United Kingdom, which gave him an automatic seat in the House of Lords, and both earldoms have been united since. Further titles held with the earldoms are: Lord Montgomerie (created 1449), Baron Ardrossan (1806) and Baron Seton and Tranent (1859). The first is in the Peerage of Scotland, while the latter two are in the Peerage of the United Kingdom.

William Dunbar mentions a Sir Hugh of Eglinton in his Lament for the Makaris, citing him as a fellow poet. He has sometimes been tentatively identified as Huchown, but this is not certain.

The Earl of Eglinton is the hereditary Clan Chief of Clan Montgomery. The ancestral seat was Eglinton Castle in Kilwinning, North Ayrshire.

== Lords Montgomerie (1449) ==
- Alexander Montgomerie, 1st Lord Montgomerie (died c. 1470)
  - Alexander Montgomerie, Master of Montgomerie (1404–1452)
- Alexander Montgomerie, 2nd Lord Montgomerie (died c. 1483)
- Hugh Montgomerie, 3rd Lord Montgomerie (c. 1460–1545) (created Earl of Eglinton in 1507)

== Earls of Eglinton (1507) ==
- Hugh Montgomerie, 1st Earl of Eglinton (c. 1460–1545)
- Hugh Montgomerie, 2nd Earl of Eglinton (died 1546)
- Hugh Montgomerie, 3rd Earl of Eglinton (c. 1531–1585)
- Hugh Montgomerie, 4th Earl of Eglinton (1563–1586)
- Hugh Montgomerie, 5th Earl of Eglinton (died 1612)
- Alexander Montgomerie, 6th Earl of Eglinton (1588–1661)
- Hugh Montgomerie, 7th Earl of Eglinton (1613–1669)
- Alexander Montgomerie, 8th Earl of Eglinton (died 1701)
- Alexander Montgomerie, 9th Earl of Eglinton (c. 1660–1729)
- Alexander Montgomerie, 10th Earl of Eglinton (1723–1769)
- Archibald Montgomerie, 11th Earl of Eglinton (1726–1796)
- Hugh Montgomerie, 12th Earl of Eglinton (1739–1819)
- Archibald William Montgomerie, 13th Earl of Eglinton, 1st Earl of Winton (1812–1861)
- Archibald William Montgomerie, 14th Earl of Eglinton, 2nd Earl of Winton (1841–1892)
- George Arnulph Montgomerie, 15th Earl of Eglinton, 3rd Earl of Winton (1848–1919)
- Archibald Seton Montgomerie, 16th Earl of Eglinton, 4th Earl of Winton (1880–1945)
- Archibald William Alexander Montgomerie, 17th Earl of Eglinton, 5th Earl of Winton (1914–1966)
- Archibald George Montgomerie, 18th Earl of Eglinton, 6th Earl of Winton (1939–2018)
- Hugh Archibald William Montgomerie, 19th Earl of Eglinton, 7th Earl of Winton (born 1966)

The heir apparent is the present holder's son, Rhuridh Seton Archibald Montgomerie, Lord Montgomerie (born 2007).

== Family tree ==
Family tree of the Marquess of Ailsa, Earl of Eglinton, and Earl of Cassilis

Robert III c. 1337–1406; King of Scotland
Lord Montgomerie, 1448
Alexander Montgomerie d. 1470; 1st Lord Montgomerie	James Kennedy; Younger of Dunure	Mary Stewart
Lord Kennedy, 1457
Alexander Montgomerie; 1404–1452 styled Master of Montgomerie	Elizabeth	Gilbert Kennedy c. 1406 – c. 1480; 1st Lord Kennedy	James Kennedy c. 1408–1465; Archbishop of St Andrews
Alexander Montgomerie d. c. 1483; 2nd Lord Montgomerie	Catherine	Colin Campbell c. 1433–1493; 1st Earl of Argyll	John Kennedy; 1454–1508; 2nd Lord Kennedy
Earl of Eglinton, 1506	Earl of Cassillis, 1234
Hugh Montgomerie c. 1460–1545; 1st Earl of Eglinton, 3rd Lord Montgomerie	Helen	Archibald Campbell d. 1513; 2nd Earl of Argyll	David Kennedy; After 1463–1513; 1st Earl of Cassilis, 3rd Lord Kennedy
John Montgomerie d. 1520	Isabel	Gilbert Kennedy; 1494–1527; 2nd Earl of Cassilis, 4th Lord Kennedy
Hugh Montgomerie d. 1546; 2nd Earl of Eglinton, 4th Lord Montgomerie	Gilbert Kennedy; 1515–1558; 3rd Earl of Cassillis, 5th Lord Kennedy
Hugh Montgomerie c. 1531–1585; 3rd Earl of Eglinton, 5th Lord Montgomerie	Gilbert Kennedy c. 1541–1576; 4th Earl of Cassilis, 6th Lord Kennedy	Thomas Kennedy c. 1549–1602 styled Master of Cassillis
Hugh Montgomerie; 1563–1586; 4th Earl of Eglinton, 6th Lord Montgomerie	Margaret	Robert Seton; 1553–1603; 1st Earl of Winton	John Kennedy; 1575–1615; 5th Earl of Cassillis, 7th Lord Kennedy	Hew Kennedy styled Master of Cassillis	Alexander Kennedy d. 1652
Hugh Montgomerie d. 1612; 5th Earl of Eglinton, 7th Lord Montgomerie	Alexander Montgomerie; 1588–1661; 6th Earl of Eglinton, 8th Lord Montgomerie	John Kennedy d. 1668; 6th Earl of Cassillis, 8th Lord Kennedy	John Kennedy d. 1665	Alexander Kennedy d. 1698
Hugh Montgomerie; 1613–1669; 7th Earl of Eglinton, 9th Lord Montgomerie	James Montgomerie of Coylsfield d. 1675	John Kennedy; 1653–1701; 7th Earl of Cassillis, 9th Lord Kennedy
Kennedy Baronet of Culzean, in the County of Ayr, 1682
Alexander Montgomerie d. 1701; 8th Earl of Eglinton, 10th Lord Montgomerie	Hugh Montgomery	John Kennedy c. 1672–1700 styled Lord Kennedy	Archibald Kennedy d. 1710; 1st Kennedy Baronet of Culzean
Alexander Seton Montgomerie c. 1660–1729; 9th Earl of Eglinton, 11th Lord Montgomerie	Susanna Montgomerie; 1690–1780	Alexander Montgomerie d. 1783	John Kennedy; 1700–1759; 8th Earl of Cassillis, 10th Lord Kennedy	John Kennedy d. 1742; 2nd Kennedy Baronet of Culzean	Archibald Kennedy; 1685–1763
Alexander Montgomerie; 1723–1769; 10th Earl of Eglinton, 12th Lord Montgomerie	Archibald Montgomerie; 1726–1796; 11th Earl of Eglinton, 13th Lord Montgomerie	Hugh Montgomerie; 1739–1819; 12th Earl of Eglinton, 14th Lord Montgomerie, 1st Baron Ardrossan	John Kennedy d. 1744; 3rd Kennedy Baronet of Culzean	Thomas Kennedy d. 1775; 9th Earl of Cassillis, 11th Lord Kennedy, 4th Kennedy Baronet of Culzean	David Kennedy before 1734–1792; 10th Earl of Cassillis, 12th Lord Kennedy, 5th Kennedy Baronet of Culzean	Archibald Kennedy; 1720–1794; 11th Earl of Cassillis, 13th Lord Kennedy
Kennedy Baronet of Culzean extinct, 1792
Baron Ailsa, of Ailsa in the County of Ayr, 1806; Marquess of Ailsa, 1831
Mary Montgomerie d. 1848	Archibald Montgomerie; 1773–1814 styled Lord Montgomerie	Archibald Kennedy; 1770–1846; 1st Marquess of Ailsa, etc. 12th Earl of Cassillis, 14th Lord Kennedy
Archibald Kennedy IV; 1794–1832 styled Earl of Cassilis
Earl of Winton (2nd creation) and Baron Seton and Tranent, 1859
Archibald William Montgomerie; 1812–1861; 13th Earl of Eglinton, 1st Earl of Winton, etc., 15th Lord Montgomerie	Archibald Kennedy; 1816–1870; 2nd Marquess of Ailsa, etc. 13th Earl of Cassillis, 15th Lord Kennedy
Archibald William Montgomerie; 1841–1892; 14th Earl of Eglinton, 2nd Earl of Winton, etc., 16th Lord Montgomerie	George Arnulph Montgomerie; 1848–1919; 15th Earl of Eglinton, 3rd Earl of Winton, etc., 17th Lord Montgomerie	Archibald Kennedy; 1847–1838; 3rd Marquess of Ailsa, etc. 14th Earl of Cassillis, 16th Lord Kennedy
Archibald Seton Montgomerie; 1880–1945; 16th Earl of Eglinton, 4th Earl of Winton, etc., 18th Lord Montgomerie	Archibald Kennedy; 1872–1943; 4th Marquess of Ailsa, etc. 15th Earl of Cassillis, 17th Lord Kennedy	Charles Kennedy; 1875–1956; 5th Marquess of Ailsa, etc. 16th Earl of Cassillis, 18th Lord Kennedy	Angus Kennedy; 1882–1957; 6th Marquess of Ailsa, etc. 17th Earl of Cassillis, 19th Lord Kennedy
Archibald William Alexander Montgomerie; 1914–1966; 17th Earl of Eglinton, 5th Earl of Winton, etc., 19th Lord Montgomerie	Archibald David Kennedy; 1925–1997; 7th Marquess of Ailsa, etc. 18th Earl of Cassillis, 20th Lord Kennedy
Archibald George Montgomerie; 1939–2018; 18th Earl of Eglinton, 6th Earl of Winton, etc., 20th Lord Montgomerie
Hugh Archibald William Montgomerie b. 1966; 19th Earl of Eglinton, 7th Earl of Winton, etc., 21st Lord Montgomerie	Archibald Angus "Charles" Kennedy; 1956–2015; 8th Marquess of Ailsa, etc. 19th Earl of Cassillis, 21st Lord Kennedy	David Thomas Kennedy b. 1958; 9th Marquess of Ailsa, etc. 20th Earl of Cassillis, 22nd Lord Kennedy
Rhuridh Seton Archibald Montgomerie b. 2007 styled Lord Montgomerie	Archibald David Kennedy b. 1995 styled Earl of Cassillis
Heir apparent to the Earldom of Eglinton	Heir apparent to the Marquessate of Ailsa

Arms of the Earl of Eglinton and Winton

The 1764 coat of arms of Alexander Montgomerie, 10th Earl of Eglinton

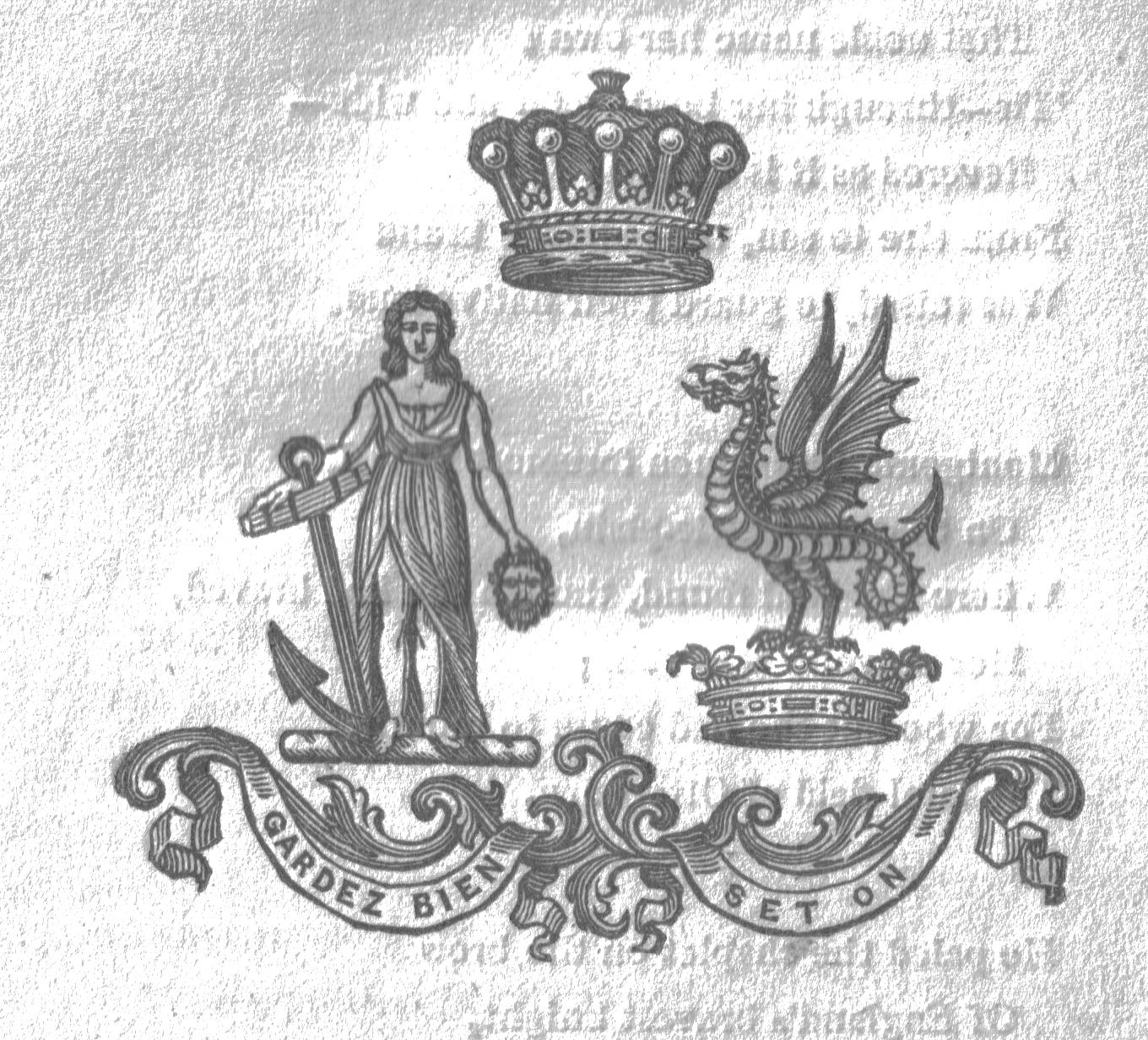
Montgomerie family crests in 1843

The Eglinton Tournament Bridge and Eglinton Castle in 1876

== See also ==
- Barony and Castle of Giffen
- Eglinton Castle
- Eglinton Country Park
- Eglinton Tournament Bridge
- Industry and the Eglinton Castle estate
- Polnoon Castle
- Robert Burns and the Eglinton Estate
- Seagate Castle
