= Archibald Montgomerie, 16th Earl of Eglinton =

Scottish earl (1880–1945)

The Right Honourable The Earl of Eglinton DL
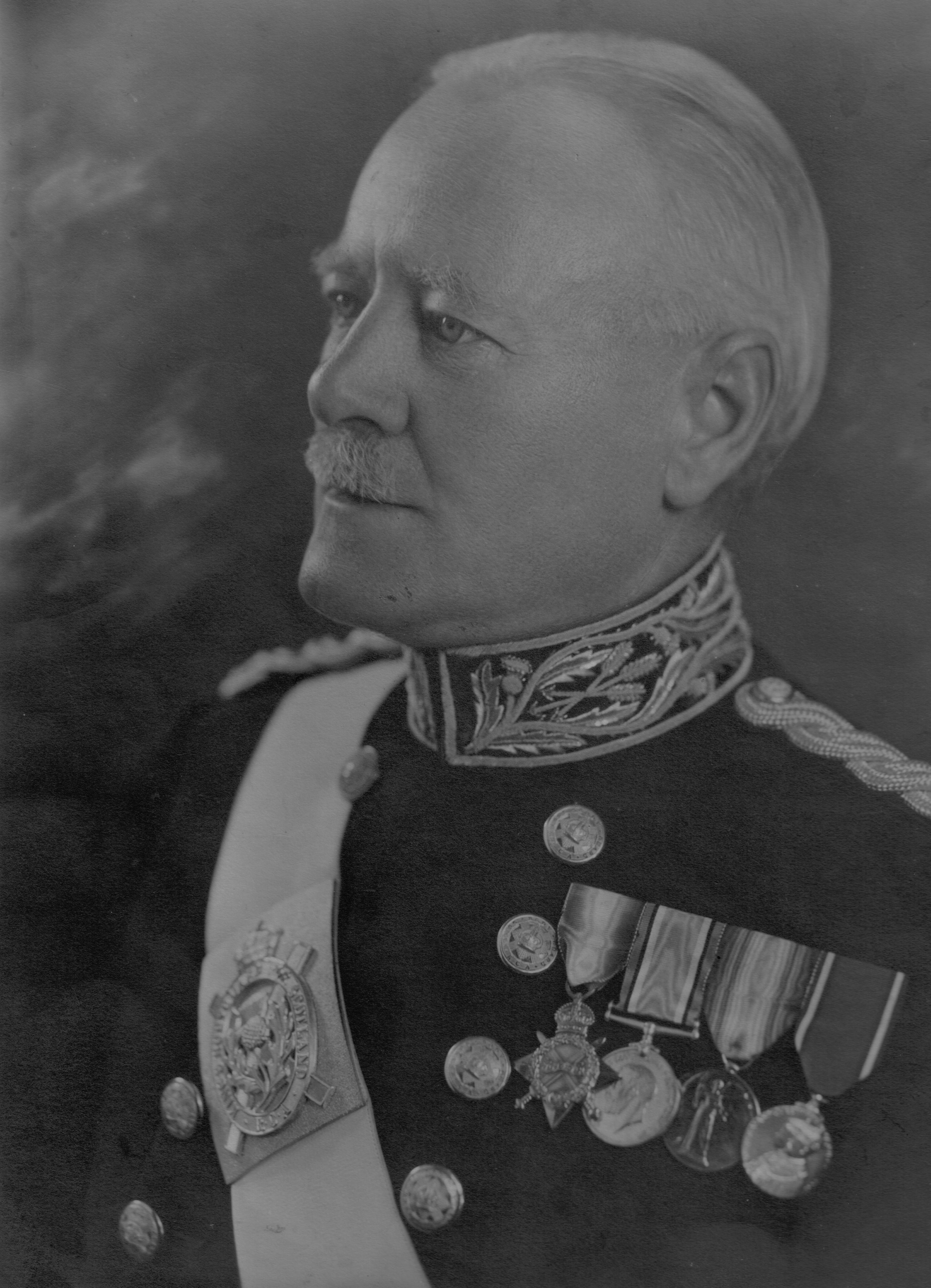
- Born: 23 June 1880
- Died: 22 April 1945 (aged 64)
- Education: Eton College
- Spouse(s): Lady Beatrice Susan Dalrymple (m. 1908; div. 1922) Marjorie McIntyre Vernon (m. 1922; died 1945)
- Children: 6
- Parent(s): George Montgomerie, 15th Earl of Eglinton; Janet Lucretia Montgomerie

Archibald Seton Montgomerie, 16th Earl of Eglinton and 4th Earl of Winton DL (23 June 1880 – 22 April 1945), styled Lord Montgomerie from 1892 to 1919, was a Scottish aristocrat who abandoned Eglinton Castle, the family seat or 'caput', in 1925.

== Early life ==
Montgomerie was the son of George Montgomerie, 15th Earl of Eglinton, and Janet Lucretia Cuninghame.

His paternal grandparents were Archibald Montgomerie, 13th Earl of Eglinton and, his first wife, Theresa Newcomen (a daughter of the 2nd Viscount Newcomen). His maternal grandparents were Capt. Boyd Alexander Cuninghame of the Royal Navy and his Australian wife, Mary (née Wilkinson) Cuninghame.

He was educated at Eton College.

== Career ==
During World War I, he served with the Life Guards, where he was mentioned in despatches. He was also a Major in the Guards Machine Gun Regiment and a Major in the Ayrshire Yeomanry.

Upon the death of his father on 10 August 1919, he succeeded as the 16th Earl of Eglinton in the Peerage of Scotland, the 5th Baron Ardrossan, the 17th Lord Montgomerie, and the 4th Earl of Winton in the Peerage of the United Kingdom, which enabled him to sit in the House of Lords. He served as a Deputy Lieutenant of Ayrshire

== Personal life ==
On 1 June 1908, he married Lady Beatrice Susan Dalrymple, a daughter of John Dalrymple, 11th Earl of Stair and the former Susan Harriet Grant-Suttie (a daughter of Sir James Grant-Suttie, 6th Baronet and Lady Susan Harriet Innes-Ker). They were divorced in 1922 after having five children:

- Lady Barbara Susan Montgomerie (1909–1992), who married Christopher Gerald Gore, son of Francis Gore and Lady Constance Milles (a daughter of the 1st Earl Sondes), in 1930.
- Lady Janet Egida Montgomerie (1911–1999), who married Lord Robert Crichton Stuart, son of John Crichton-Stuart, 4th Marquess of Bute, and Augusta Bellingham, in 1934.
- Lady Betty Mary Seton Montgomerie (1912–1996), who married Capt. George Vane Hay-Drummond, son of Col. Arthur William Henry Drummond of Cromlix (a grandson of the 11th Earl of Kinnoull) and Mary Scott (a daughter of Sir Edward Scott, 5th Baronet), in 1933.
- Archibald William Alexander Montgomerie, 17th Earl of Eglinton (1914–1966), who married Ursula Joan Watson, daughter of Hon. Ronald Bannatyne Watson (a son of William Watson, Baron Watson), in 1938.
- Hon. George Seton Montgomerie (1919–1934), who died at age 14.

On 16 August 1922, he married Marjorie (née McIntyre) Vernon (1890–1963), the widow of Guy Fitzpatrick Roger Vernon (youngest son of Hon. Greville Richard Vernon), who died in a car accident in 1914. The daughter of Thomas Walker McIntyre of Sorn and Jeannie Paterson Galloway, she was also sister to Gordon McIntyre, Lord Sorn. Together, they had two children:

- Lady Anne Montgomerie (1922–1989), who married Maj. Gordon Alexander Smith, son of Alexander Smith, in 1942. They divorced in 1951.
- Hon. Roger Hugh Montgomerie (1923–2011)

Lord Eglinton died on 22 April 1945. He was succeeded by his eldest son, Archibald. His widow, the dowager Lady Eglinton, died on 7 December 1963.

=== Descendants ===
Through his daughter Lady Barbara, he was a great-grandfather of Georgina Fitzalan-Howard, Duchess of Norfolk.

Masonic offices
Preceded by Robert Gordon Gilmour	Grand Master of the Grand Lodge of Scotland; 1920–1921	Succeeded by The Earl of Elgin
Peerage of Scotland
Preceded by George Montgomerie	Earl of Eglinton; 1919–1945	Succeeded by Archibald Montgomerie
Peerage of the United Kingdom
Preceded by George Montgomerie	Earl of Winton; 1919–1945	Succeeded by Archibald Montgomerie
