= List of awards and nominations received by Tilda Swinton =

Tilda Swinton awards and nominations
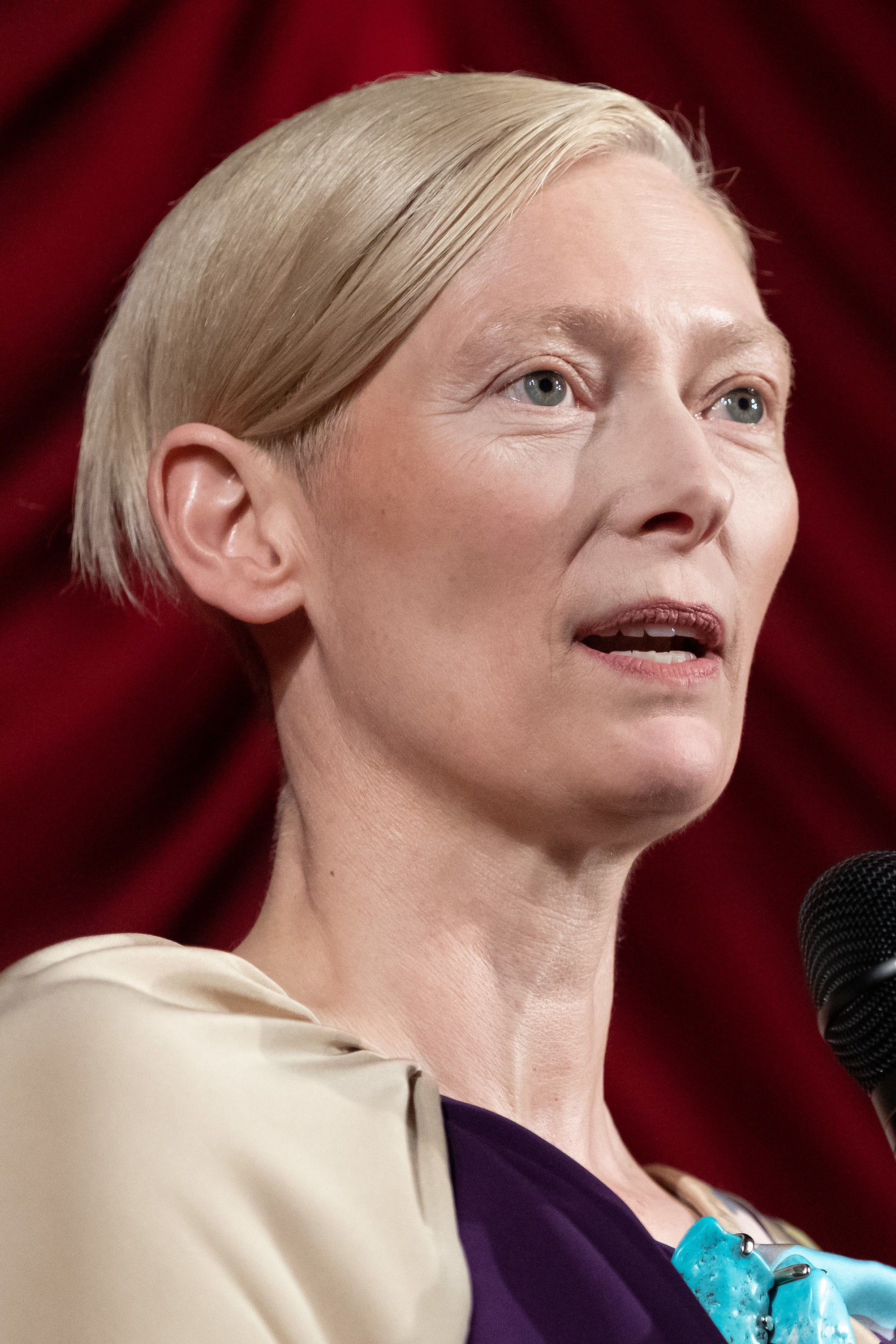
- Swinton at the 2018 Vienna International Film Festival
Award	Wins	Nominations
Totals
Academy Awards	1	1
Berlin Film Festival	2	2
BAFTA Awards	2	9
BIFA Awards	1	5
Critics' Choice Awards	0	5
European Film Awards	1	2
Golden Globe Awards	0	4
Independent Spirit Awards	1	3
Satellite Awards	1	6
Saturn Awards	2	3
Screen Actors Guild Awards	0	5
Venice Film Festival	2	2
Various critics associations	23	74
Miscellaneous awards	10	20
Wins	46
Nominations	141

Tilda Swinton is a Scottish actress. Throughout her career, Swinton has received several accolades, including one Academy Award, one BAFTA Award and a European Film Award, among others. Swinton began her career in several experimental films in the late 1980s. In 1991 she won the Volpi Cup for Best Actress at the Venice Film Festival for her work in the romantic drama Edward II. She next starred as the titular role in Sally Potter's Orlando for which she was nominated for the European Film Award for Best Actress.

In 2001, she starred in the thriller film The Deep End, role that many consider her "breakout role" for American audiences, for her performance in the film she was nominated for the Golden Globe Award for Best Actress in a Motion Picture – Drama and the Independent Spirit Award for Best Female Lead. She was highly praised for her performance as the ruthless general counsel Karen Crowder in Michael Clayton (2007), role that earned her the Academy Award for Best Supporting Actress and the BAFTA Award for Best Actress in a Supporting Role, alongside Golden Globe and Screen Actors Guild Award nominations. In 2011, she received several awards and nominations for her performance as Eva Khatchadourian in Lynne Ramsay's We Need to Talk About Kevin, including a third Golden Globe nomination and winning the European Film Award for Best Actress.

For her influential career, she has received several special awards and honours, including the Richard Harris Award from the British Independent Film Awards in 2005, the British Film Institute Fellowship in 2020 and the Mary Pickford Award from the International Press Academy in 2020. Also, she has been honoured in prestigious film festivals, like the Venice Film Festival, where she received the Golden Lion for Lifetime Achievement in 2021 and the Berlin International Film Festival, where she has been honoured with two Teddy Awards, one as an individual Jury Prize in 1988 and a second one in 2008 as a Special Award shared with Keith Collins, Simon Fisher Turner, Isaac Julien and James Mackay for their contributions in keeping the legacy of English director Derek Jarman. In November 2022, she was presented with the 2022 FIAF Award "for her work on the preservation and promotion of archive film, film history and women's role in it".

== Major associations ==
=== Academy Awards ===
Year	Category	Nominated work	Result	Ref.
2007	Best Supporting Actress	Michael Clayton	Won	

=== BAFTA Awards ===
Year	Category	Nominated work	Result	Ref.
British Academy Film Awards
2007	Best Actress in a Supporting Role	Michael Clayton	Won	
2008	Best Actress in a Supporting Role	Burn After Reading	Nominated	
2011	Best Actress in a Leading Role	We Need to Talk About Kevin	Nominated	
British Academy Scotland Awards
1993	Best Actress in a Leading Role	Orlando / Man to Man	Nominated	
2003	Best Actress in a Leading Role	Young Adam	Won	
2021	Best Actress in a Film	The Personal History of David Copperfield	Nominated	
2022	Best Actress in Film	The Souvenir Part II	Nominated	
2024	Best Actress in Film	The Eternal Daughter	Nominated	
2025	Best Actress (Film/Television)	The End	Nominated	

=== Berlin International Film Festival ===
Year	Category	Nominated work	Result	Ref.
1988	Teddy Jury Award	The Last of England	Won	
2008	Special Teddy Award	—N/a	Won	
2025	Honorary Golden Bear	—N/a	Honored	

=== European Film Awards ===
Year	Category	Nominated work	Result	Ref.
1993	European Actress	Orlando	Nominated	
2011	European Actress	We Need to Talk About Kevin	Won	
2024	European Actress	The Room Next Door	Nominated	

=== Golden Globe Awards ===
Year	Category	Nominated work	Result	Ref.
2001	Best Actress in a Motion Picture – Drama	The Deep End	Nominated	
2007	Best Supporting Actress – Motion Picture	Michael Clayton	Nominated	
2011	Best Actress in a Motion Picture – Drama	We Need to Talk About Kevin	Nominated	
2024	Best Actress in a Motion Picture – Drama	The Room Next Door	Nominated	

=== Screen Actors Guild Awards ===
Year	Category	Nominated work	Result	Ref.
2002	Outstanding Cast in a Motion Picture	Adaptation	Nominated	
2007	Outstanding Actress in a Supporting Role	Michael Clayton	Nominated	
2008	Outstanding Cast in a Motion Picture	The Curious Case of Benjamin Button	Nominated	
2011	Outstanding Actress in a Leading Role	We Need to Talk About Kevin	Nominated	
2014	Outstanding Cast in a Motion Picture	The Grand Budapest Hotel	Nominated	

=== Venice Film Festival ===
Year	Category	Nominated work	Result	Ref.
1991	Volpi Cup for Best Actress	Edward II	Won	
2020	Golden Lion for Lifetime Achievement	—N/a	Honoured	

== Industry awards ==
Organizations	Year	Category	Work	Result	Ref.
British Independent Film Awards	2003	Best Performance by an Actress in a British Independent Film	Young Adam	Nominated	
British Independent Film Awards	2005	Richard Harris Award	—N/a	Honored	
British Independent Film Awards	2011	Best Performance by an Actress in a British Independent Film	We Need to Talk About Kevin	Nominated	
British Independent Film Awards	2019	Best Supporting Actress	The Personal History of David Copperfield	Nominated	
British Independent Film Awards	2021	Best Supporting Actress	The Souvenir Part II	Nominated	
César Awards	2009	Best Actress	Julia	Nominated	
Critics' Choice Movie Awards	2007	Best Supporting Actress	Michael Clayton	Nominated	
Critics' Choice Movie Awards	2008	Best Acting Ensemble	The Curious Case of Benjamin Button	Nominated	
Critics' Choice Movie Awards	2011	Best Actress	We Need to Talk About Kevin	Nominated	
Critics' Choice Movie Awards	2014	Best Supporting Actress	Snowpiercer	Nominated	
Critics' Choice Movie Awards	2016	Best Actress in an Action Movie	Doctor Strange	Nominated	
David di Donatello	1992	Best Foreign Actress	Orlando	Won	
Goya Awards	2025	Best Actress	The Room Next Door	Nominated	
Independent Spirit Awards	2002	Best Female Lead	The Deep End	Nominated	
Independent Spirit Awards	2015	Best Female Lead	Only Lovers Left Alive	Nominated	
Independent Spirit Awards	2019	Robert Altman Award	Suspiria	Won	

== Critic awards ==
Year	Association	Category	Nominated work	Result
1997	Boston Society of Film Critics	Best Actress	Female Perversions	Nominated
2001	Las Vegas Film Critics Society	Best Actress	The Deep End	Won
2001	Chicago Film Critics Association	Best Actress	The Deep End	Nominated
2001	Dallas–Fort Worth Film Critics Association	Best Actress	The Deep End	Runner-up
2001	Boston Society of Film Critics	Best Actress	The Deep End	Won
2001	Online Film Critics Society	Best Actress	The Deep End	Nominated
2001	Phoenix Film Critics Society	Best Actress	The Deep End	Nominated
2001	Toronto Film Critics Association	Best Actress	The Deep End	3rd Place
2002	Online Film Critics Society	Best Cast	Adaptation	Nominated
2002	Phoenix Film Critics Society	Best Cast	Adaptation	Nominated
2003	London Film Critics' Circle	British Actress of the Year	Young Adam	Nominated
2005	London Film Critics' Circle	British Supporting Actress of the Year	The Chronicles of Narnia	Nominated
2007	Dallas-Fort Worth Film Critics Association	Best Supporting Actress	Michael Clayton	Won
2007	Detroit Film Critics Society	Best Supporting Actress	Michael Clayton	Won
2007	Kansas City Film Critics Circle	Best Supporting Actress	Michael Clayton	Won
2007	North Texas Film Critics Association	Best Supporting Actress	Michael Clayton	Won
2007	Vancouver Film Critics Circle	Best Supporting Actress	Michael Clayton	Won
2007	Alliance of Women Film Journalists	Best Actress in Supporting Role	Michael Clayton	Nominated
2007	Alliance of Women Film Journalists	Best Ensemble Cast	Michael Clayton	Nominated
2007	Chicago Film Critics Association	Best Supporting Actress	Michael Clayton	Nominated
2007	Houston Film Critics Society	Best Supporting Actress	Michael Clayton	Nominated
2007	London Film Critics' Circle	British Supporting Actress of the Year	Michael Clayton	Nominated
2007	National Society of Film Critics	Best Supporting Actress	Michael Clayton	Nominated
2007	Online Film Critics Society Award	Best Supporting Actress	Michael Clayton	Nominated
2007	St. Louis Gateway Film Critics Association	Best Supporting Actress	Michael Clayton	Nominated
2007	Toronto Film Critics Association	Best Supporting Actress	Michael Clayton	Nominated
2008	London Film Critics' Circle	British Actress of the Year	Julia	Nominated
2008	New York Film Critics Circle	Best Actress	Julia	Nominated
2008	Online Film Critics Society	Best Actress	Julia	Nominated
2008	London Film Critics' Circle	British Supporting Actress of the Year	The Curious Case of Benjamin Button	Won
2009	London Film Critics' Circle	British Actress of the Year	I Am Love	Nominated
2009	San Diego Film Critics Society	Best Actress	I Am Love	Nominated
2010	Alliance of Women Film Journalists	Best Depiction of Nudity, Sexuality, or Seduction	I Am Love	Nominated
2011	Austin Film Critics Association	Best Actress	We Need to Talk About Kevin	Won
2011	Houston Film Critics Society	Best Actress	We Need to Talk About Kevin	Won
2011	National Board of Review	Best Actress	We Need to Talk About Kevin	Won
2011	Online Film Critics Society	Best Actress	We Need to Talk About Kevin	Won
2011	San Francisco Film Critics Circle	Best Actress	We Need to Talk About Kevin	Won
2011	Alliance of Women Film Journalists	Best Actress	We Need to Talk About Kevin	Nominated
2011	Dallas-Fort Worth Film Critics Association	Best Actress	We Need to Talk About Kevin	Runner-up
2011	Indiana Film Journalists Association	Best Actress	We Need to Talk About Kevin	Runner-up
2011	London Film Critics' Circle	Actress of the Year	We Need to Talk About Kevin	Nominated
2011	London Film Critics' Circle	British Actress of the Year	We Need to Talk About Kevin	Nominated
2011	San Diego Film Critics Society	Best Actress	We Need to Talk About Kevin	Nominated
2011	Southeastern Film Critics Association	Best Actress	We Need to Talk About Kevin	Runner-up
2011	Washington D.C. Area Film Critics Association	Best Actress	We Need to Talk About Kevin	Nominated
2011	Women Film Critics Circle	Best Actress	We Need to Talk About Kevin	Nominated
2011	Women Film Critics Circle	Courage in Acting	We Need to Talk About Kevin	Nominated
2014	Florida Film Critics Circle	Best Ensemble	The Grand Budapest Hotel	Won
2014	Detroit Film Critics Society	Best Ensemble	The Grand Budapest Hotel	Won
2014	Detroit Film Critics Society	Best Supporting Actress	Snowpiercer	Nominated
2014	Boston Online Film Critics Association	Best Supporting Actress	Snowpiercer	Won
2014	Central Ohio Film Critics Association	Best Supporting Actress	Snowpiercer	Won
2014	Georgia Film Critics Association	Best Supporting Actress	Snowpiercer	Won
2014	Las Vegas Film Critics Society	Best Supporting Actress	Snowpiercer	Won
2014	Iowa Film Critics	Best Supporting Actress	Snowpiercer	3rd Place
2014	Southeastern Film Critics Association	Best Supporting Actress	Snowpiercer	Runner-up
2014	Utah Film Critics Association	Best Supporting Actress	Snowpiercer	Runner-up
2014	Houston Film Critics Society	Best Supporting Actress	Snowpiercer	Nominated
2014	North Carolina Film Critics Association	Best Supporting Actress	Snowpiercer	Nominated
2014	Online Film Critics Society	Best Supporting Actress	Snowpiercer	Nominated
2014	San Francisco Film Critics Circle	Best Supporting Actress	Snowpiercer	Nominated
2014	Toronto Film Critics Association	Best Supporting Actress	Snowpiercer	Nominated
2014	Washington D.C. Area Film Critics Association	Best Supporting Actress	Snowpiercer	Nominated
2014	Alliance of Women Film Journalists	Best Actress in Supporting Role	Snowpiercer	Won
2014	Alliance of Women Film Journalists	Actress Defying Age and Agism	Only Lovers Left Alive and Snowpiercer	Won
2014	Alliance of Women Film Journalists	Best Depiction of Nudity, Sexuality, or Seduction	Only Lovers Left Alive	Nominated
2014	Vancouver Film Critics Circle	Best Actress	Only Lovers Left Alive	Won
2015	IndieWire Critics Poll	Best Supporting Actress	A Bigger Splash	5th Place
2015	London Film Critics' Circle	Best Supporting Actress	Trainwreck	Nominated
2018	Indiana Film Journalists Association	Best Supporting Actress	Suspiria	Runner-up
2018	Dallas–Fort Worth Film Critics Association	Best Supporting Actress	Suspiria	Nominated
2019	London Film Critics Circle	Best Supporting Actress	The Souvenir	Nominated
2023	National Society of Film Critics	Best Actress	The Eternal Daughter	Nominated

== Miscellaneous awards ==
Organizations	Year	Category	Work	Result	Ref.
AACTA International Award	2011	Best Actress	We Need to Talk About Kevin	Nominated	
AARP Annual Movies for Grownups Awards	2015	Best Actress	A Bigger Splash	Nominated	
Evening Standard British Film Awards	2007	Best Actress	Michael Clayton	Nominated	
Evening Standard British Film Awards	2008	Best Actress	Julia	Won	
Evening Standard British Film Awards	2015	Best Actress	A Bigger Splash	Nominated	
Genie Awards	2000	Best Actress in a Leading Role	Possible Worlds	Nominated	
Fangoria Chainsaw Awards	2006	Best Supporting Actress	Constantine	Nominated	
Fangoria Chainsaw Awards	2013	Best Actress	Only Lovers Left Alive	Nominated	
Fangoria Chainsaw Awards	2019	Best Supporting Actress	Suspiria	Won	
Fright Meter Awards	2018	Best Supporting Actress	Suspiria	Won	
Gotham Independent Film Awards	2012	Best Ensemble Cast	Moonrise Kingdom	Nominated	
International Cinephile Society Award	2008	Best Actress	Julia	Won	
Jameson Dublin International Film Festival	2009	Best Female Performance	I Am Love	Won	
MTV Movie Award	2005	Best Villain	The Chronicles of Narnia: The Lion, the Witch and the Wardrobe	Nominated	
Italian National Syndicate of Film Journalists	2009	European Silver Ribbon Award	I Am Love	Won	
Satellite Awards	2001	Best Actress – Motion Picture Drama	The Deep End	Nominated	
Satellite Awards	2006	Best Actress – Motion Picture Drama	Stephanie Daley	Nominated	
Satellite Awards	2007	Best Supporting Actress – Motion Picture	Michael Clayton	Nominated	
Satellite Awards	2009	Best Actress – Motion Picture Drama	I Am Love	Nominated	
Satellite Awards	2014	Best Supporting Actress – Motion Picture	Snowpiercer	Nominated	
Satellite Awards	2021	Mary Pickford Award	—N/a	Won	
Satellite Awards	2025	Best Actress – Motion Picture Drama	The Room Next Door	Nominated	
Saturn Awards	2005	Best Actress	The Chronicles of Narnia: The Lion, the Witch and the Wardrobe	Nominated	
Saturn Awards	2008	Best Supporting Actress	The Curious Case of Benjamin Button	Won	
Saturn Awards	2017	Best Supporting Actress	Doctor Strange	Won	
Seattle International Film Festival	1992	Best Actress	Orlando	Won	
Thessaloniki International Film Festival	1992	Best Actress	Orlando	Won	
Village Voice Film Poll	2008	Best Actress	Julia	Won	

== Honorary awards ==
Organizations	Year	Award	Result	Ref.
Edinburgh Napier University	2006	Honorary degree for her services to performing arts	Honored	
Britannia Awards	2008	British Artist of the Year	Honored	
Telluride Film Festival	2011	Silver Medallion	Honored	
Museum of Modern Art	2013	Special Film Gala Tribute	Honored	
British Film Institute	2020	BFI Fellowship	Honored	
International Federation of Film Archives	2022	FIAF Award	Honored	
