= The Angelic Conversation (film) =

1985 film

- DVD cover
- Directed by: Derek Jarman
- Screenplay by: Derek Jarman
- Based on: Shakespeare's sonnets by William Shakespeare
- Produced by: James Mackay
- Starring: Paul Reynolds; Phillip Williamson
- Narrated by: Judi Dench
- Cinematography: Derek Jarman and James Mackay
- Edited by: Peter Cartwright; Derek Jarman; Cerith Wyn Evans
- Music by: Coil (with additional music by Benjamin Britten)
- Distributed by: British Film Institute
- Release date: 28 February 1985
- Running time: 81 minutes
- Country: United Kingdom
- Language: English

The Angelic Conversation is a 1985 arthouse drama film directed by Derek Jarman. Its tone is set by the juxtaposition of slow-moving photographic images and Shakespeare's sonnets read by Judi Dench. The film consists primarily of homoerotic images and opaque landscapes through which two men take a journey into their desires. The film is shot on Super-8, then transferred to videotape, and then to 35mm film.

In his only published prospectus of the film, Jarman himself described the work as "A SERIES OF SLOW-MOVING SEQUENCES THROUGH A LANDSCAPE SEEN FROM THE WINDOWS OF AN ELIZABETHAN HOUSE. TWO YOUNG MEN FIND AND LOSE EACH OTHER. THE FILM ENDS IN A GARDEN." He also characterized it as "a dream world" populated by magic and ritual, as well as threatening images that "remind you there is a price to be paid in order to gain this dream in the face of a world of violence."

== Plot ==
The Angelic Conversation does not have a traditional plot or narrative, but is instead structured as a montage of images, in which two young men, played by Paul Reynolds and Philip Williamson, wander separately through a bleak landscape, connect emotionally and physically, and then are alone again, this time in a garden, where each holds only his memory of the other. The two protagonists are not characters in the conventional sense; they have no names or dialogue, and no information is given about their identities. Jarman stated that "quite honestly it’s just people walking around. They aren't doing anything. And that's also one of the charms about the film. There's absolutely no, very little, residual narrative or anything in it. So they just are being the people in it, you know? They’re not being in a drama or anything."

The film opens with the first two lines of William Shakespeare's Sonnet 151, in white text on a black background: "Love is too young to know what conscience is, / Yet who knows not conscience is born of love." In the first sequence, in a muted golden light Williamson gazes contemplatively through a lattice window in an upper-floor room of a prodigy house (a large, showy Elizabethan or Jacobean house) built from local honey-colored ham stone, as Dench reads in voiceover the first of 14 of Shakespeare's sonnets placed in the soundtrack. The sonnets are, in this order: 57, 90, 43, 53, 148, 126, 29, 94, 30, 55, 27, 61, 56, and 104.

At the end of this sequence, extracts of which appear throughout the film, Williamson slowly turns his face toward the viewer. Then the film cuts to Reynolds, dressed in a vaguely Elizabethan costume, who holds a small circular mirror to reflect light into the camera; light-reflecting discs are a recurring motif in the film, which then proceeds to unfold as if it were Williamson's daydream, conjured by Reynolds. In this respect, Reynolds is like a contemporary incarnation of the sixteenth-century natural philosopher and occultist John Dee, a figure Jarman often referenced in his films and writings, who used showstones (polished discs or crystal stones that reflect light) to conjure and then converse with angels, who revealed to him truths about the natural world and how God would restore it to its state of pristine perfection. He called these sessions "angelic conversations."

The two men, dressed similarly in black jackets and pants, separately walk through desolate, rocky landscapes, often filled with smoke. At times Williamson carries a barrel on his back and Reynolds a log, burdens that evoke Christ carrying the cross during the Passion (in Jarman's film The Garden (1990), a gay male couple is portrayed as Christ). These scenes are interspersed with images of a rotating radar antenna, overturned and burning vehicles, and chainlink fences. Evoking a sense of menace, these motifs signify what the scholar Martin Frey described as the perilous status of gay men in 1980s England, where they were threatened by AIDS, social animus, and governmental repression under the administration of Margaret Thatcher. As Jarman observed, "Destruction hovers in the background of The Angelic Conversation; the radar, the surveillance, the feeling one is under psychic attack; of course we are under attack at the moment. In the background of The Angelic Conversation there is surveillance by Nobodaddy" ("Nobodaddy," a shortened form of "Nobody's Daddy," is the English artist and writer William Blake's name for a cruel, repressive god who fathers nothing creative).

Eventually each man appears to enter a dark underworld, which they occasionally illuminate with flares and torches. Then they emerge into the light. Williamson is shown on a rocky outcrop jutting into the sea, holding aloft a shell, and then submerging himself in the water, as if he were performing a ritual of ablution. Reynolds is shown with two other men, including a magician-like figure played by Christopher Hobbs, holding and kissing a golden orb.

In the following sequence, the two men are first seen together, serving a king. Naked except for the cloth that drapes his loins, he is covered with tattoos, including the face of a demon on his chest; the performer is Dave Baby, an artist and model then active in London's postpunk scene, who appears briefly in the "Witches' Song" segment of Jarman's short film, Broken English: Three Songs by Marianne Faithfull (1979). While Williamson holds two torches, Reynolds ritually and reverentially washes and kisses the king's body. Jarman stated that this scene was inspired in part by "The Wanderer," an Old English elegical poem about a wandering man exiled from his lord, kinsmen, and homeland, who laments his lost life. It specifically evokes a passage in which the wanderer dreams of the times he paid homage to his lord.

Following this sequence is what Jarman described as the film's center. In a primarily black and white sequence of mostly long and slowed-down takes, Williamson and Reynolds wrestle, their movements more dancelike than martial. Then in a primarily color sequence projected largely at real speed, they embrace, caress, and kiss, their images intercut with images of other men engaged in ritualistic actions evoking magic. As Jarman wrote in his diary, 'There had never been a good screen kiss in a gay film. I wanted to right that." The sequence ends with the rotating radar antenna, now seen through flowering branches.

In the film's final sequence, the two men have separated. Reynolds, holding two torches, walks along a road alone. Williamson, carrying a fan, ambles through the garden of the Elizabethan house and approaches a lily pond, which Jarman described as a wishing well in which he sees memory. The film's last shot shows Reynolds in the same garden, where he repeatedly draws a flowering branch to his face, breathing in the fragrance. This shot is intercut with images of Williamson swimming in the sea. The film freezes and ends on an image of Reynolds holding the flowering branch to his face as Dench reads the last word of the couplet that culminates Sonnet 104: "For fear of which, hear this, thou age unbred: / Ere you were born was beauty's summer dead."—the narrator's proclamation to future generations reading the poem that the beautiful man he adored died long before they were born, an acknowledgment of the ephemerality of beauty.

== Style ==
Jarman was both a filmmaker and painter. The fact that he made The Angelic Conversation by organically shooting and then manipulating footage, instead of following a screenplay, underscores his painterly approach to filmmaking. In addition, the technique he used to make the film produced a textured, grainy quality and a palette of varied tones, as if he were painting with light. These images have been described as reminiscent of Impressionist or Pointillist painting. In addition, the dark shadows and glowing flares in the underworld sequence have been compared to Jarman's own black and gold paintings of the 1980s. This effect also evokes photographs by nineteenth-century photographers like Julia Margaret Cameron and the later Pictorialist generation.

In certain sequences, Jarman altered the frame rate of the film to slow down time. For example, he could film on Super 8 at six frames per second, which enabled him to stretch a three-minute Super 8 cartridge about three times longer to 10 minutes. Then he could project the resulting 10-minute film onto a wall at a speed of three frames per second, stretching it to 20 minutes, and record it on videotape for editing. As the art historian Michael Charlesworth observed, "The result for the viewer is akin to watching a series of very rapidly flashed still photographs. They coalesce into a moving picture, but one never loses the effect of a series of individual moments. Time slows. Small on-camera movements take on enormous presence. A flickering candle-flame appears to have a paper-like texture, as it shows the circular cells that constitute 8-mm film."

== Cast ==
None of the characters in the film have names.

- Dave Baby
- Timothy Burke
- Simon Costin
- Christopher Hobbs
- Philip McDonald
- Toby Mott
- Steve Randall
- Robert Sharp
- Tony Wood
- Judi Dench (narrator)
- Paul Reynolds
- Phillip Williamson

== Production ==
=== Development ===
In 1983 Jarman began working on a retrospective of his paintings that opened at the Institute of Contemporary Arts (ICA) in London on February 3, 1984 and was accompanied by screenings of his films. So that the Super 8 films he made in the 1970s could be shown more easily, with his collaborator James Mackay he projected them onto a wall at the ICA and videotaped them. He then began to experiment with the aesthetic possibilities of this process. These experiments inspired him to make a nonnarrative film, initially titled Psychic Billy's Angelic Conversation, using this technique, without a screenplay or even a detailed scenario. This project, which he retitled The Angelic Conversation, developed organically over the next few months.

=== Casting ===
Jarman first cast Reynolds, whom he had often seen in London gay clubs and yearned to film: "I thought he had an amazing face, moody with great sadness, he seemed set apart. He was always immaculately dressed." Reynolds was not a professional actor, but a graduate student at the Institute of Archaeology, University of London. One evening at the club Heaven Jarman asked Reynolds if he could film him. Reynolds agreed (later, he played an archaeologist in Jarman's film The Last of England (1987); after receiving his PhD in 1991, he became an actual archaeologist). Then, when Jarman and Reynolds were out one evening, they saw Philip Williamson, who was not a professional actor either. Jarman invited him to appear in the film, and he, too, said yes (his only other film credit is Will You Dance with Me?, which Jarman filmed in September 1984, but which was lost until 2014). Describing the casting process somewhat differently, Mackay recalled that Jarman met Reynolds at the Bell in King's Cross and that Mackay himself introduced Williamson to Jarman.

Jarman's decision to include Williamson transformed the film into what he described as a love story. As he stated, when "we started the film, I had no idea that I was going to make it a love story! The initial attraction was mine for him [Reynolds]. The 'love affair' was purely cinematic." But while traveling in the south of England with Jarman, Reynolds and Williamson had a brief affair, which Jarman made the crux of the film.

=== Locations ===
Jarman filmed The Angelic Conversation in the summer of 1984. He selected locations that were personally significant to him. For example, the film opens with Williamson looking through the window of a room in Montacute House, an Elizabethan prodigy house in Somerset, and ends in its garden. This house is located near Curry Mallet, one of the homes where Jarman lived as a child. He also filmed Williamson in Dorset—in the caves of Winspit, where he had shot the short Super 8 film The Siren and the Sailor (1972) and scenes for Jubilee (1978) and at the nearby Dancing Ledge, where he had shot additional scenes for Jubilee and would shoot again for The Last of England (Dancing Ledge is also the title of a memoir that Jarman published in early 1984). He filmed Reynolds in the Isle of Grain, a peninsula located east of London in the estuary of the River Thames, which he described as "a very mysterious landscape, one of the oddest places." He filmed the wrestling and love scenes with Reynolds and Williamson at Phoenix House, his studio flat on Charing Cross Road in London, and he filmed other performers at the ICA.

=== Filming ===
Jarman filmed The Angelic Conversation with a Nizo Super 8 camera spontaneously and situationally, in a manner reminiscent of his Super 8 home movies of the 1970s (Mackay served as the second camera operator). This camera had a frame rate dial that enabled him to increase the number of frames filmed per second. He described in detail how he then manipulated his footage: "The film was generated on Super-8 and a VHS video camera linked to a U-matic deck. The Super-8 footage was transferred through that video camera by projection on a wall at about 3 frames per second. The resulting U-matic was time-coded by Research Recordings onto VHS video cassettes." He continued: "We did a preliminary edit, here in my flat, on VHS with a simple camera, home movie editor with two decks and a television set. We chopped it together. Then using the time-coded VHS we edited the U-matics and put them onto 1 inch tape. That tape became the master tape. This is all silent at this stage. And then the whole thing was transferred to 35 mm film."

=== Soundtrack ===
As Jarman was editing The Angelic Conversation in September 1984, he began to think about the soundtrack. He had previously collaborated with the group Psychic TV, which included John Balance (whose given name was Geoffrey Rushton) and Peter Christopherson, who were also romantic partners. By 1983 Balance and Christopher had fully formed a new group, Coil; in February 1984 they released an EP titled How to Destroy Angels. Jarman invited Coil to create the score for the film. The soundtrack also incorporates the Sea Interludes from Benjamin Britten's opera Peter Grimes, performed by the chorus and orchestra of the Royal Opera House Covent Garden, conducted by Colin Davis, as well as sound effects like a ticking clock, a rainstorm, chirping birds, and the sound of rowing through water.

In addition, the soundtrack includes Judi Dench reading 14 of Shakespeare's sonnets. Jarman had long been interested in making a film that incorporated the sonnets. However, the idea of having Dench read a selection for The Angelic Conversation did not occur to him until he began working on the soundtrack. He wanted a woman to read the sonnets so that viewers would not assume that one of the two protagonists was talking about the other. He was particularly pleased with her readings: "She did them in the morning quite quickly. … She's got a most beautiful voice." In addition, he remarked that "the voice became that of an observer, leaving the imagery autonomous. It also established the feminine in the film, which otherwise would have been lacking. It completed it."

Jarman periodically shared footage of the film with Balance and Christopherson. Then, as Christopherson recalled, "When the film was assembled, we all went to a studio in Camden to record the soundtrack. One or two 'set pieces' were from existing Coil albums, but most was improvised directly to picture, John and I constantly trying out new things on cutting-edge sampling equipment, and Derek bouncing around, turning sulfur-bright as always: 'Yes, that's good…well, perhaps not that…but what about the sound of rowing here? Yes, wonderful, marvelous!"

=== Funding ===
Jarman received funding for the film serendipitously. After he completed his feature film The Tempest (1979), he struggled to find funding for his next major projects, Caravaggio (1986) and Neutron (unrealized)—in part, he believed, because he had become identified as a gay filmmaker. Accordingly, he focused on making music videos for performers like Marianne Faithfull, Wang Chung, and Marc Almond, as well as short Super 8 films. But after he showed Peter Sainsbury, head of production at the British Film Institute (BFI), some of the footage he had filmed for The Angelic Conversation, Sainsbury became intrigued by the aesthetic potential of Jarman's innovative technique, and the BFI awarded him £50,000 to produce a short film. Jarman, however, took this opportunity to extend The Angelic Conversation to feature length.

== Reception ==
=== Premieres ===
The world premiere of The Angelic Conversation was on February 18, 1985 at the 35th Internationale Filmfestspiele Berlin (Berlin International Film Festival), where it was screened out of competition in the Info-Schau section and well received. It was then screened in multiple countries through the end of the year. It was presented at the Star Cinéma on May 18, 1985 during the Festival de Cannes (Cannes Film Festival) as part of a presentation of BFI films. It debuted in the United Kingdom as a late-night screening on June 21, 1985 at the cinema Camden Plaza during gay pride celebrations, with proceeds going to the Terrence Higgins Trust, an HIV charity founded in 1982 and named after the first person in the United Kingdom to die from an AIDS-related illness. It was first shown in the United States on June 24, 1985 at the Castro Theater, as part of the 9th San Francisco International Lesbian and Gay Film Festival. It also premiered in Australia at the 34th Melbourne International Film Festival that same month. In July it was presented at the 9th Cambridge Film Festival and in August at the 39th Edinburgh Film Festival.

Since 1985, the film has been screened repeatedly at film festivals and special events throughout the world. For example, in 2008, Christopherson (with David Tibet, Othon Mataragas and Ernesto Tomasini) performed a new live soundtrack to the film during a special screening at the Turin Lesbian and Gay Film Festival. And in 2026, a new 2K restoration was released, including a screening on September 3, 2026, at the Philosophical Research Society in Los Angeles presented by 7th House and Dirty Looks.

=== Reviews ===
The Angelic Conversation received relatively few reviews by critics for mainstream newspapers and magazines. In The Times (London) the critic Geoff Brown wrote: "Ultimately the film seems like an excellent short that spun out of control, yet there is ample evidence in its dream-like images of Jarman's singular poetic gift—a rare commodity in British cinema." A critic for Variety commented that the film was difficult and experimental in form and content and that although it "works indirectly and symbolically, with no overt grappling, it is a gay love story between two young men …. Much of the film is in slow motion, with a highly painterly, grainy quality, set against industrial wastelands and abstract landscapes." In the BFI's Monthly Film Bulletin, Stephen Jenkins praised the film: "Jarman has effectively fashioned a double-edged work. It functions both as a painter's film, with its figurative edges carefully and beautifully blurred, and as a kind of ironic comment on the British cinema's literary tradition."

In The Sunday Times (London), however, the film critic Iain Johnstone described the film as dull and pretentious and sarcastically proposed that the BFI take back the funding it had awarded Jarman to buy books for its library. The English film writer Tony Rayns, who generally supported Jarman's work, criticized the film as "a homosexual version of heterosexual kitsch." In a capsule review in the Los Angeles Times for a 1988 screening of the film at the American Film Institute's BritFest, the film critic Kevin Thomas wrote: "An attempt by Derek Jarman … to evoke homosexual longing through blurred, step-printed images of Calvin Klein-Bruce Weber-type young males in various locales accompanied, on occasion, by Judi Dench's eloquent reading of Shakespearean sonnets. At 20 minutes 'The Angelic Conversation' might just have seemed poetic; at 78, it's a pretentious bore."

In contrast to the limited number of reviews, The Angelic Conversation has been analyzed extensively in scholarly books and articles (see "Further reading" section).

== Home media ==
The Angelic Conversation was released on DVD by Zeitgeist Films in 2008 as disc 1 of Glitterbox: Derek Jarman × 4. This release includes interviews with Christopher Hobbs, James Mackay, and Jarman, as well a booklet that includes a short text by Christopherson about the soundtrack.

== Themes and analysis ==
Jarman regarded The Angelic Conversation as his favorite film out of the many films that he made. He once described it as "my journey of discovery through the summer of '84."

The film stands within the tradition of the gay poetic film, which includes Jean Cocteau's Orphic Trilogy, consisting of The Blood of a Poet (1932), Orpheus (1950), and Testament of Orpheus (1959); Kenneth Anger's Fireworks (1947); and Jean Genet's Un chant d'amour (1950). It also evokes elements of films by Anger that incorporate themes of ritual, magic, and the occult, such as Inauguration of the Pleasure Dome (1954), Invocation of My Demon Brother (1969), and Lucifer Rising (1972).

The film responds to the contemporary social and political context in which it was made—Margaret Thatcher's England. The overturned and burning vehicles reference the social unrest that plagued English cities in the 1980s, and the rotating radar antenna evokes the surveillance to which gay men were subjected to at that time, when police harassment and media intrustion into their private lives were frequent.

Jarman stated that with this film, he recontextualized Shakespeare's sonnets to reclaim a history for gay people. Of the 154 sonnets, among the most canonical poems in English, in 1 to 17 the male narrator advises a young man to marry and procreate, in 18 to 126 he celebrates his love for this man, and in 127 to 154 he addresses the so-called Dark Lady. All but one of the sonnets that Jarman selected are from the second group. He deployed the sonnets to portray gay desire in an unprecedented way: "I was exploring a landscape I had never seen on film: areas of psyche that hadn't been projected before. I have seen very few films on male love which are gentle, they usually have a violent subtext—the violence you have to traverse before you make peace with yourself." He also described the film itself as "gentle. There is that hovering, external violence, but at the tend of the film it's cauterised by the blossom, which obliterates the radar. The blossom takes over."

The film reflects Jarman's enduring interest in the Elizabethan era, the height of the English Renaissance. The sequences shot at Montacute House that frame its beginning and end reference Elizabethan culture, as does Jarman's decision to use Shakespeare's sonnets in the soundtrack. In addition, the film's title quotes the angel conversations that John Dee, a court advisor to Queen Elizabeth I and a natural philosopher who also studied alchemy, astrology, and other occult sciences, claimed to have. With the aid of a scryer (assistant) and a showstone, Dee recorded these conversations on how the world worked and how God would restore it to its state of pristine perfection after the apocalypse he believed was imminent.At the beginning of the film, Jarman portrays Reynolds as a Dee-like character, flashing light into the camera with a mirror as if to conjure Williamson's dream with him, just as Dee used a showstone to conjure his conversations with angels.

== Shakespeare's sonnets ==
The 14 sonnets the film features are:

Sonnet LVII

Being your slave, what should I do but tend
Upon the hours and times of your desire?

Sonnet XC

Then hate me when thou wilt, if ever, now,
Now, while the world is bent my deeds to cross,

Sonnet XLIII

When most I wink, then do mine eyes best see,
For all the day they view things unrespected;

Sonnet LIII

What is your substance, whereof are you made,
That millions of strange shadows on you tend?

Sonnet CXLVIII

O me, what eyes hath love put in my head,
Which have no correspondence with true sight!

Sonnet CXXVI

O thou, my lovely boy, who in thy power
Dost hold Time's fickle glass, his sickle hour,

Sonnet XXIX

When, in disgrace with fortune and men's eyes,
I all alone beweep my outcast state,

Sonnet XCIV

They that have power to hurt and will do none,
That do not do the thing they most do show

Sonnet XXX

When to the sessions of sweet silent thought
I summon up remembrance of things past,

Sonnet LV

Not marble nor the gilded monuments
Of princes shall outlive this powerful rhyme,

Sonnet XXVII

Weary with toil, I haste me to my bed,
The dear repose for limbs with travel tired

Sonnet LXI

Is it thy will, thy image should keep open
My heavy eyelids to the weary night?

Sonnet LVI

Sweet love, renew thy force; be it not said
Thy edge should blunter be than appetite,

Sonnet CIV

To me, fair friend, you never can be old,
For as you were when first your eye I ey'd
