= Nigel Terry =

English actor (1945–2015)

- Terry in 2003
- Born: Peter Nigel Terry; 15 August 1945; Bristol, England
- Died: 30 April 2015 (aged 69); Newquay, Cornwall, England
- Occupation: Actor
- Years active: 1967–2014

Peter Nigel Terry (15 August 1945 – 30 April 2015) was an English stage, film, and television actor, typically in historical and period roles. He played Prince John in Anthony Harvey's film The Lion in Winter (1968) and King Arthur in John Boorman's Excalibur (1981).

== Early life ==
Terry was born on 15 August 1945 in Bristol, the son of Frank Albert Terry OBE, DFC, a pilot in the Royal Air Force, and his wife, Doreen. The family soon moved to Truro, Cornwall, where his father worked as a probation officer. Terry attended Truro School in Truro, where he developed an interest in acting and became skilled at drawing and painting.

His parents encouraged him to go on the stage, and after working briefly in forestry and as a petrol pump attendant, he joined the National Youth Theatre. He enrolled at London's Central School of Speech and Drama in 1963, working both on stage and behind the scenes. He joined the Oxford Meadow Players in 1966, working initially as assistant stage manager.

== Career ==
=== Theatre ===
Terry worked mostly in theatre. After training with repertory companies like the Oxford Meadow Players and Bristol Old Vic, Terry appeared in many productions with the Royal Shakespeare Company, the Round House Theatre and the Royal Court Theatre. Among his roles was Daniel de Bosola in the 1989 Royal Shakespeare Company production of John Webster's The Duchess of Malfi. In the same year he played Pericles in David Thacker's production of Pericles, Prince of Tyre.

=== Films ===
Terry appeared in about 20 films, most notably as John in The Lion in Winter (1968) with Katharine Hepburn, Peter O'Toole and Anthony Hopkins; King Arthur in John Boorman's Excalibur (1981); and the title character in Derek Jarman's Caravaggio (1986). He worked with Jarman on four more films: The Last of England (1988), War Requiem (1989), Edward II (1991) and Blue (1993).

His last film role was in Troy in 2004, playing the Trojan high priest.

=== Television ===
An early television appearance was as the agoraphobic Harry Mandrake in the Randall and Hopkirk (Deceased) episode "Somebody Just Walked Over My Grave" (1970).

His main US and British television appearances include Covington Cross, a series set in medieval times. He also appeared in Casualty as Denny, as General Cobb in the Doctor Who episode "The Doctor's Daughter" and as Gabriel Piton in Highlander: The Series. He also played Sam Jacobs in a two-part Waking the Dead episode entitled "Anger Management". He appeared in a third-series Pie in the Sky episode, "Irish Stew", as Byron de Goris. He also appeared in an episode of Foyle's War.

== Personal life and death ==
In 1993, after 30 years of living in London, Terry moved back to Cornwall. He was a very private person. Terry died of emphysema in Newquay, Cornwall, on 30 April 2015, at the age of 69. In the absence of any surviving close family, his memorial service was organised by close friends Maggie Steed and David Horovitch in Truro on 19 May 2015, attended by fellow actors and friends.

== Selected filmography ==
Year	Title	Role	Notes
1968	The Lion in Winter	Prince John	
1975	Slade in Flame	Assistant Disc Jockey	Uncredited
1981	Excalibur	King Arthur	
1985	Sylvia	Aden Morris	
1985	Déjà Vu	Michael/Greg	
1986	Caravaggio	Caravaggio	
1986	On Wings of Fire	Zarathustra	
1987	The Last of England	Narrator	
1989	War Requiem	Abraham	
1991	Edward II	Mortimer	
1992	Christopher Columbus: The Discovery	Roldan	
1993	Blue	Narrator	
2001	The Emperor's New Clothes	Montholon	
2001	The Search for John Gissing	Alan Jardeen	
2002	FeardotCom	Turnbull	
2003	The Tulse Luper Suitcases	Sesame Esau	
2004	Troy	Archeptolemus	
2005	Red Mercury	Lindsey	

== Television ==
Year	Title	Role	Notes
1967	ITV Play of the Week	Philip	Episode: "The Man who Understood Women"
1967	Theatre 625	Generalov	Episode: "The Single Passion"
1968	Sherlock Holmes	Harold Latimer	Episode: "The Greek Interpreter"
1969	Thirty-Minute Theatre	Peter	Episode: "Remote Control"
1969	BBC Play of the Month	Jacques	Episode: "The Marquise"
1970	Randall and Hopkirk (Deceased)	Harry	Episode: "Somebody Just Walked Over My Grave"
1986	Screen Two	Railway Policeman	Episode: "Song of Experience"
1988	The Ruth Rendell Mysteries	Denys Villiers	Serial: "A Guilty Thing Surprised"
1990	South of the Border	Eddie	2 episodes
1991	The Bill	Bailey	Episode: "Furthers"
1991	The Orchid House	Master	Miniseries
1991	Zorro	Jorge Ventura	Episode: "A Woman Scorned"
1992	Spender	McDonna	Episode: "Fee"
1992	Covington Cross	Sir Thomas Grey	Miniseries
1993	Highlander: The Series	Gabriel Piton	Episode: "Eye of the Beholder"
1994	In Suspicious Circumstances	Lieutenant Colonel Frank Crozier	Episode: "To Encourage the Others"
1994	Wycliffe	Lawrence Vinter	Episode: "The Last Rites"
1995	Jackanory	Storyteller	Story: A Wizard of Earthsea
1995	Resort to Murder	Kepler	4 episodes
1996	Pie in the Sky	Byron de Goris/James Jackson	Episode: "Irish Stew"
1997	The Hunchback	King Louis XI	TV film
1998	Mortimer's Law	Peter Frampton	1 episode
1998	Far From the Madding Crowd	Mr. Boldwood	TV film
1999	Silent Witness	Jim Thorn	Episode: "Gone Tomorrow"
2000	Holby City	Nigel Turrall	Episode: "Moving On"
2002	Crime and Punishment	Svidrigailov	Miniseries
2003	The Vice	Ted Bascombe	Episode: "Untouchable"
2004	Cutting It	Dexter Berkowicz	1 episode
2004	Waking the Dead	Sam Jacobs	Episode: "Anger Management"
2004	Foyle's War	Hugh Jackson	Episode: "They Fought in the Fields"
2005	Sea of Souls	Professor Michael Holloway	3 episodes
2005	Spooks	Professor Stephen Curtis (uncredited)	Episode: "The Special"
2006	Blackbeard	Calico Billy	Miniseries
2007	The Time of Your Life	Jack	Miniseries
2007	Casualty	Denny Davidson	2 episodes
2008	Doctor Who	Cobb	Episode: "The Doctor's Daughter"
2009	Agatha Christie's Marple	Christian Gulbrandsen	Episode: "They Do It with Mirrors"
