= Spencer Leigh (actor) =

English actor

- Born: c. 1963 (age 61–62); Liverpool, England
- Occupation: Actor
- Years active: 1983–1992, 2012–present

Spencer Leigh (born c. 1963) is an English TV and film actor.

== Biography ==
=== Early life ===
Born and raised in Liverpool, Leigh attended the King David High School, Childwall, a Jewish secondary school which also accepted non-Jewish pupils. (Other notable alumni include actor Jason Isaacs and musician Guy Chambers).

=== Career ===
He became interested in the theatre and joined the Everyman and Playhouse Youth Theatre soon after it opened in Liverpool. Fellow theatre student David Morrissey and he were chosen by Yorkshire Television to play as two poverty-stricken kids in the drama miniseries One Summer in 1983.

Leigh has since appeared in various TV and film roles, including in several films directed by Derek Jarman, and in the premiere episode of the TV detective drama Inspector Morse, wherein he played as a university student involved in a murder investigation. In the 1980s, he was considered one of the "Brit Pack".

After appearing in the 1992 television series Between the Lines, it wouldn't be for another twenty years before he would partake in his next role, portraying Nunzio in the 2012 film Hitchcock.

=== Personal life ===
He moved to the United States in the early 1990s, where he worked with music video producer Jake Scott, then directing TV commercials.

Leigh also worked with Criterion on documentary material for the Merchant Ivory Collection.

== Filmography ==
Year	Film	Role	Notes
1983	One Summer	Icky Higson	TV series (all 5 episodes)
1986	Caravaggio	Jerusaleme	
1986	Smart Money	Leon	
1987	Inspector Morse	Ned Murdoch	TV series ("The Dead of Jericho")
1987	Prick Up Your Ears	Constable	
1987	First Sight	Colin	TV series ("Leaving Home")
1987	Aria	Young Man	(segment "Depuis le jour")
1987	Knights of God	Brother Wilson	TV series
1988	L'ispirazione	Unnamed Role	Short film by Derek Jarman
1988	The Last of England	Soldier and various other roles	
1988	Young Toscanini	Heckler	(known in Italian as Il giovane Toscanini)
1989	War Requiem	Soldier 1	
1989	Hannay	Vermilion Thorpe	TV series ("That Rough Music")
1989	Strapless	Hus	
1990	The Garden	Mary Magdalene / Adam	
1990	Casualty	Garry Salter	TV series (Series 5, "Street Life")
1990	Boon	Ian Goran	TV series ("Thicker Than Water")
1992	Between the Lines	Dave Potter	TV series ("Nothing Personal")
2012	Hitchcock	Nunzio	
