= Christopher Hobbs (production designer) =

British production designer (1941–2024)

Christopher Hobbs (15 June 1941 – 13 January 2024) was a British production designer and actor. He designed for several Derek Jarman films including Caravaggio, The Garden and Edward II. Hobbs was born in Chatham, Kent on 15 June 1941, and died on 13 January 2024, at the age of 82.

== Early life and education ==
Christopher John Hobbs was born on 15 June 1941 in Chatham, Kent, England, the son of Sheila Hobbs (née Hickman) and John Hobbs, an officer in the Royal Air Force who later became British air attaché in Washington, D.C. His father's RAF career meant that Hobbs spent part of his childhood in the United States, attending schools in Montgomery, Alabama, and Washington, D.C. He subsequently studied at George Washington University before returning to England, where he studied art at the Slade School of Fine Art in London.

Hobbs developed an interest in painting during childhood. He recalled beginning to draw at the age of eight, frequently copying paintings by the Old Masters. His parents encouraged him to pursue a broader education, believing that a career in painting would not provide financial security. After completing his university studies in the United States, he returned to England and undertook a three-year period of training with a picture restorer.

== Career ==
Following his training in picture restoration, Hobbs was recruited by a theatre director to create props and decorative objects for theatrical productions. He subsequently attempted to establish himself as a painter, but found it difficult to make a living from painting alone. His experience in theatre led to work with film director Ken Russell, for whom he created sculptures, paintings, props and sets for theatre and cinema.

His first film work was as a props designer on Russell's The Devils (1971), on which he also worked alongside Derek Jarman. This began a long professional association with Jarman, who subsequently employed Hobbs on a number of experimental films and feature productions. Hobbs contributed illustrations to Sebastiane (1976) and worked as costume designer on Jubilee (1978).

Hobbs became particularly associated with Jarman's Caravaggio (1986), for which he undertook production design, props and the creation of paintings reproducing the work of the Italian artist. The production was originally conceived on a larger scale, with filming intended to take place in Italian palaces, but financial limitations led Hobbs and Jarman to construct their own interpretation of Renaissance Italy in a London warehouse. Among the techniques employed was painting a concrete floor black and flooding it with water to create reflections resembling polished marble. A mask and shield designed by Hobbs for Caravaggio are held in the Victoria and Albert Museum's collection relating to the film.

Hobbs subsequently served as production designer on three further Jarman feature films: The Last of England (1987), The Garden (1990) and Edward II (1991). His other collaborations with Jarman included Garden of Luxor (1972) and Imagining October (1984). He also worked on the Pet Shop Boys' live tour in 1989, filmed by Jarman.

Hobbs continued his association with Ken Russell, working on Savage Messiah (1972), Tommy (1975), Gothic (1986) and Salome's Last Dance (1988). His production design for Gothic drew on the architectural setting of Wrotham Park in Hertfordshire, while his work on Salome's Last Dance helped create the film's elaborate Victorian setting.

He also worked with director Terence Davies on The Long Day Closes (1992), recreating the streets of Davies's childhood in Liverpool. Rather than reproducing the streets exactly, Hobbs constructed an exaggerated version based on the director's memories, incorporating distorted railings, uneven roads and deliberately weathered architectural details.

Other film and television credits included Dennis Potter's television drama Cold Lazarus (1996), Todd Haynes's Velvet Goldmine (1998) and Patricia Rozema's Mansfield Park (1999). His final major screen project was the BBC television serial Gormenghast (2000), for which he designed more than 100 sets. His work on the production earned him the Royal Television Society award for best production design.

== Other artistic and restoration work ==
Alongside his film and television career, Hobbs worked as a painter, sculptor, decorative artist and architectural restoration specialist. His commissions included murals for palaces in Oman, decorative work for historic buildings, garden features for a Spanish castle and mosaics for Westminster Cathedral in London. He also painted a decorative installation for the Victoria and Albert Museum in connection with an exhibition of Neoclassical art.

His restoration work included the Menagerie at Horton House, near Northampton, where he helped restore the deteriorating historic structure and its decorative interiors. He was also involved in the restoration of Plas Teg, a Jacobean mansion in Flintshire, where he served as custodian for a period. His other restoration work included advising on Uppark following the fire there in 1989.

In 2002, Hobbs purchased a farmhouse in the village of Empury in the Morvan region of Burgundy, France. He converted its large barn into an art studio and became involved in village life. He described the Morvan landscape as a major attraction and said that he had made Empury his principal residence. He moved to Burgundy permanently in 2005.

One of his commissions during this period was a large painting for the casino of the ocean liner Queen Mary 2. Commissioned by Cunard, the work depicted 24 figures dressed in evening clothes in a 1950s casino setting. The oil painting was executed on three aluminium panels, each measuring approximately three metres square. Four residents of Empury agreed to have their faces incorporated into the composition. Hobbs completed the work within three months.

Hobbs also created sculptures and decorative objects for private clients, including portraits and commissioned works for members of the British aristocracy. His work combined traditional painting and craftsmanship with theatrical and cinematic techniques.
