= Blue (1993 film) =

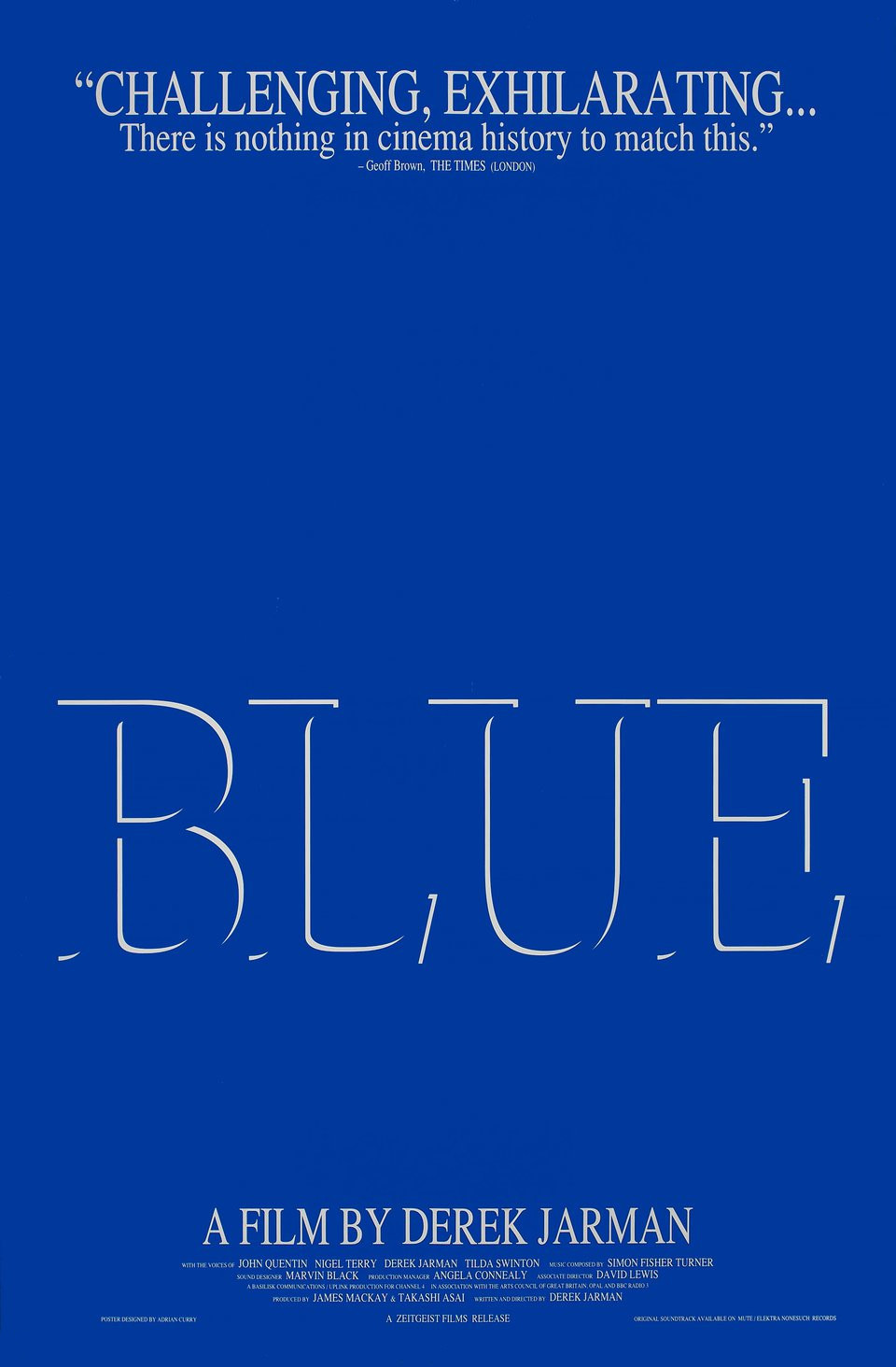
- Theatrical release poster
- Directed by: Derek Jarman
- Written by: Derek Jarman
- Produced by: James Mackay; Takashi Asai
- Narrated by: John Quentin; Nigel Terry; Derek Jarman; Tilda Swinton
- Music by: Simon Fisher Turner; John Balance; Momus; Peter Christopherson; Danny Hyde; Karol Szymanowski; Erik Satie; Brian Eno
- Production companies: Basilisk Communications; Uplink; Arts Council of Great Britain; Opal; BBC Radio 3
- Distributed by: Channel 4 Basilisk Communications
- Release dates: June 1993 (Venice Biennale); 19 September 1993 (UK)
- Running time: 79 minutes
- Countries: United Kingdom; Japan
- Language: English
- Budget: £90,000
- Box office: £4,000 (UK)

Blue is a 1993 experimental film directed by Derek Jarman. It is his final feature film, released four months before his death from AIDS-related complications. Such complications had already rendered him partially blind at the time of the film's release and he was only able to see in shades of blue.

The film was his last testament as a film-maker and consists of an unchanging entirely blue screen, to a soundtrack where Jarman's and some of his long-time collaborators' narration describes his life and vision. Critical reception for Blue has been positive.

== Background ==
Jarman had been thinking of making Blue since at least 1987. Jarman stated that this was "the first feature film to embrace the intellectual imperative of abstraction".

Jarman had contracted AIDS and by 1993 was severely physically and visually impaired. On 19 February 1994 at the age of 52, just months after the film's premiere, Jarman died of an AIDS-related illness.

An early idea for the film was to dedicate the work of French artist Yves Klein, known for his use of blue monochrome in his paintings. However, this was given up, as his preoccupation with AIDS became central to the work.

Jarman used notebooks, rather than scripts, treatments or storyboards (as is more traditionally used in film production), to plan the film.

== Production ==
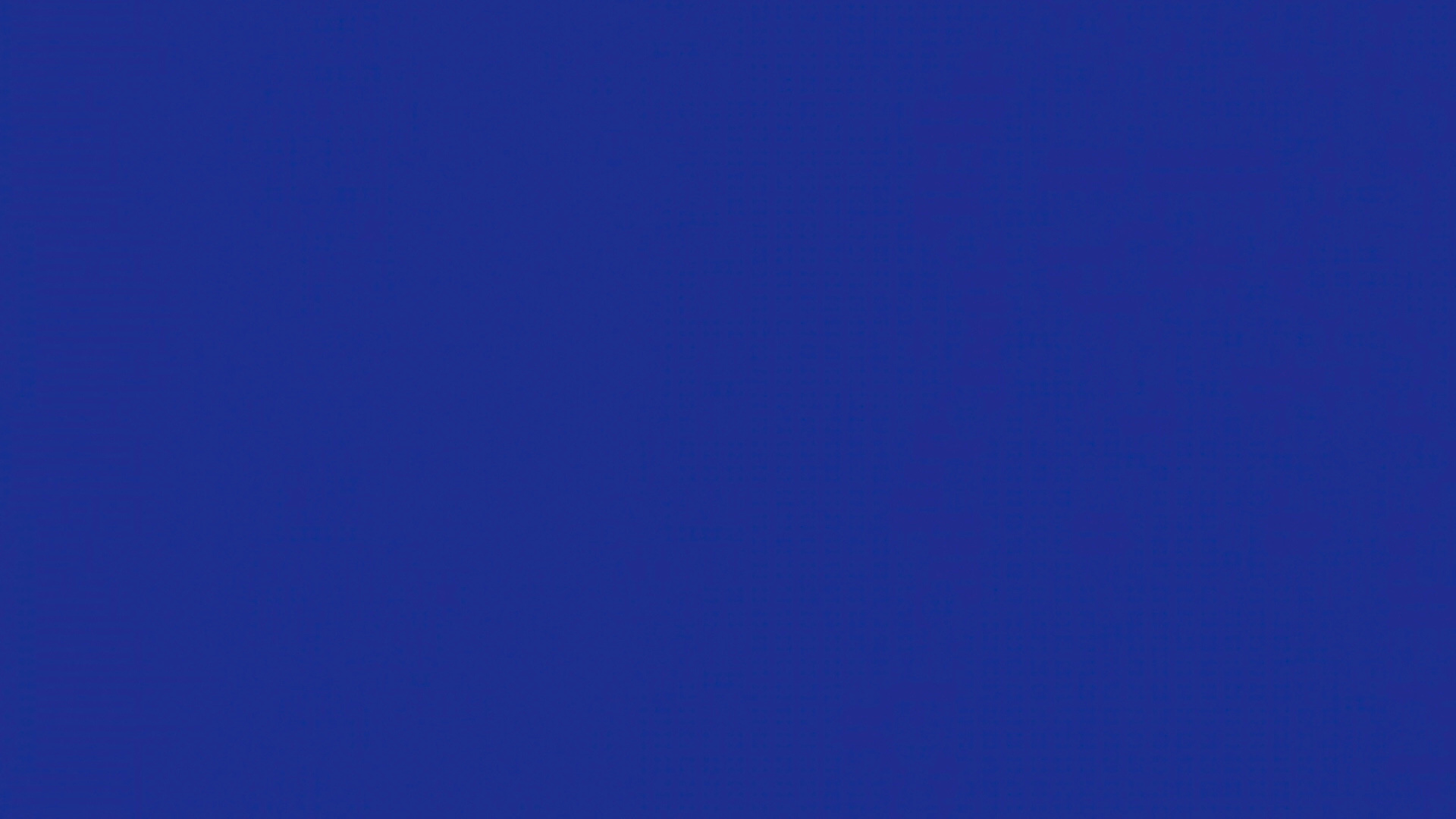
A frame from Blue

The image track for the film is the abstract colour blue, created in a film laboratory as a wavelength of light captured for the film's run time of 79 minutes on 35mm film stock.

Jarman had a long-standing interest both in abstraction and monochrome, across both his film and painting work.

== Structure and soundtrack ==
The film is split into two halves, with differing strands of narration.

The first story, intercut with the second, tells the adventures of Blue, as a character and color. Blue is described as getting into fights with other colours, "Yellowbelly scorches the earth with its accursed breath...", to adventures, "Marco Polio stumbles across the blue mountains...".

The other story features the day-to-day life of Derek Jarman, a gay man living in 1990s London, and the complications of living with AIDS, including thoughts of his health and how long he has left until he dies, the weakening of his body, and the eventual decline of his eyesight. Some of the events mentioned are realistic and true, such as visiting a café with friends, discussing the war in Sarajevo, and having difficulty with day-to-day life, such as putting clothes on backward. Others feel more dreamlike, such as when Jarman wonders what is beyond the sky and wondering what an astronaut may be like.

Throughout the film a set of names are repeated: "David. Howard. Graham. Terry. Paul." These names are all former lovers and friends of Jarman who had died of AIDS.

Intermittently throughout the film is the sound of Tibetan bells, traditionally used in Tibetan Buddhism to call deities or to dismiss them at the end of rituals.

== Cast ==
All narrators:

- John Quentin
- Nigel Terry
- Derek Jarman
- Tilda Swinton

== Release and reception ==
On its premiere, on 19 September 1993, Channel 4 and BBC Radio 3 collaborated on a simultaneous broadcast so viewers could enjoy either the film or the stereo soundtrack. Radio 3 listeners were also able to send away for a blue postcard ahead of the broadcast, to look at during the radio broadcast. Radio 3 subsequently broadcast the soundtrack separately as a radio play and it was later released as a CD. Blue has been released on DVD in Germany and Italy. On 23 July 2007, British distributor 'Artificial Eye' released a DVD tying Blue with Glitterbug, a collage of Jarman's Super-8 footage.

Cinematographer Christopher Doyle has called Blue one of his favourite films, calling it "one of the most intimate films I've ever seen." On review aggregator website Rotten Tomatoes, the film holds an approval rating of 100% based on 5 reviews.

In the 2022 Sight and Sound critic's poll of the greatest films of all time, Blue was tied for 225th place.

== See also ==
- List of avant-garde films of the 1990s
