= James Mackay (film producer) =

British film producer (born 1954)

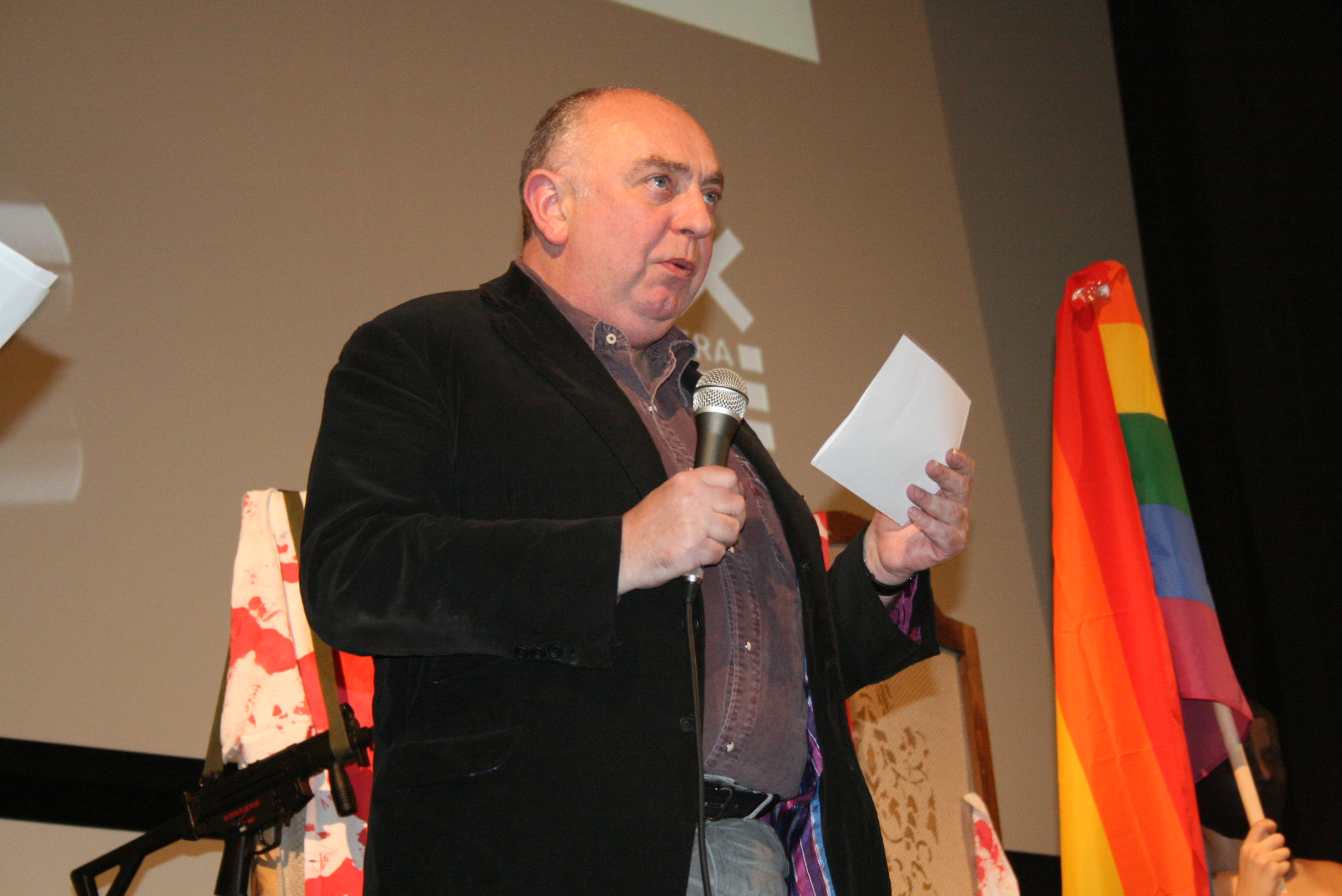
James Mackay at Mezipatra in 2009.

James Mackay (born 1954) is a British film producer.

He was born in Inverness, Scotland and after studies at North East London Polytechnic, he worked in the London Filmmaker's Co/op as cinema programmer. At the end of the 1970s, he compiled a series of film screenings called New British Avant -Garde films, for the Edinburgh International Film Festival, and he also programmed for the FORUM of the Berlin Film Festival.

In 1981, he established a production and distribution company Dark Picture, specializing in new film and video, and thus began his collaboration with Derek Jarman. He produced some of Derek Jarman's most important movies e.g. The Angelic Conversation (1985), The Garden (1990 film) or Blue. He has collaborated also with John Maybury, Hannah Collins, Davide Pepe and Bernard Rudden.

In 2009, James Mackay was a member of a main jury of the Czech queer film festival Mezipatra.

== Producer filmography ==
- In the Shadow of the Sun (1980)
- Sloane Square: A Room of One's Own (1981)
- T.G.: Psychic Rally in Heaven (1981)
- Pirate Tape (1983)
- What Can I Do with a Male Nude? (1985)
- The Angelic Conversation (1985)
- Caravaggio (1986)
- Aria (1987)
- L'ispirazione (1988)
- The Last of England (1988)
- The Garden (1990)
- The Gay Man's Guide to Safer Sex (1992)
- The Next Life (1993)
- Projections (1993)
- Blue (1993)
- Glitterbug (1994)
- Daybreak (2000)
- Parallel (2007)
- Derek (2008)
