= War Requiem (film) =

1989 British film of Britten's choral work

- U.S theatrical release poster
- Directed by: Derek Jarman
- Screenplay by: Derek Jarman
- Based on: War Requiem by Benjamin Britten
- Produced by: Don Boyd
- Starring: Laurence Olivier; Nathaniel Parker; Tilda Swinton; Sean Bean; Nigel Terry
- Cinematography: Richard Greatrex
- Edited by: Rick Elgood
- Music by: Benjamin Britten
- Distributed by: Anglo International Films
- Release date: 6 January 1989
- Running time: 92 minutes
- Country: United Kingdom
- Language: English

War Requiem is a 1989 film adaptation of Benjamin Britten's musical piece of the same name.

It was shot in 1988 by the British film director Derek Jarman with the 1963 recording as the soundtrack, produced by Don Boyd and financed by the BBC. Decca Records required that the 1963 recording be heard on its own, with no overlaid soundtrack or other sound effects. The film featured Nathaniel Parker as Wilfred Owen, and Laurence Olivier in his last acting appearance before his death in July 1989. The film is structured as the reminiscences of Olivier's character, the Old Soldier, and Olivier recites "Strange Meeting" in the film's prologue.

== Cast ==
- Laurence Olivier (Old Soldier)
- Nathaniel Parker (Wilfred Owen)
- Tilda Swinton (Nurse)
- Sean Bean (German Soldier)
- Nigel Terry (Abraham)
- Patricia Hayes (Mother)
- Owen Teale (Unknown Soldier)
- Jodie Graber (Young boy soldier)
- Spencer Leigh (Soldier 1)

== Filming ==
Shooting for the film took place at Darenth Park Hospital in Kent, beginning 17 October 1988 and lasting for 18 days. It was released on the following dates in English-speaking countries:

- United Kingdom, 6 January 1989
- Canada, 12 September 1989
- United States, 26 January 1990.

== Release ==
The film was released on VHS and Laserdisc in 1990, but because of its limited release, copies are quite rare. A US (Region 1/NTSC) DVD is available from Kino International. The film has been released on UK Region 2 DVD featuring a Making of War Requiem documentary and interviews with Swinton, Parker and Don Boyd (who also provides an audio commentary). A DVD has also been released in Japan. The film, classified "PG" on its UK release, was classified "12" on its 2008 home media release, with the comment "Contains infrequent strong documentary images of war horror".

The film is included in the Derek Jarman Collection Blu-ray box set, released by the BFI in 2019.
