= Simon Fisher Turner =

English musician (born 1954)

- Turner at the 2026 BFI London Film Festival

Background information
- Born: Simon John Fisher Turner; November 21, 1954 (age 71); Dover, Kent, England
- Genres: Indie pop; glam rock; experimental; ambient
- Occupation: Musician
- Instruments: Guitar; vocals

Simon John Fisher Turner (born November 21, 1954) is an English musician, songwriter, composer, producer and actor.

After portraying Ned East in the 1971 BBC TV adaptation of Tom Brown's Schooldays and roles in films such as The Big Sleep (1978), Turner rose to fame as a teenage star in Britain when his mentor, Jonathan King, released Turner's eponymous first album on UK Records in 1973. For a period of two years Turner was a member of The Gadget and also joined The The. He has used several names as a recording artist, including Simon Fisher Turner, The King of Luxembourg, Deux Filles and Simon Turner. He continues to record albums for Mute Records as Simon Fisher Turner.

Turner was also a member of The Portsmouth Sinfonia Orchestra, and plays clarinet on the orchestra's only live album recorded at The Albert Hall, London.

== Career ==
In the 1980s, Turner released several singles on the él record label as the King of Luxembourg, many of them having been given airplay by BBC Radio DJ John Peel. In 1990 he released a solo album on Creation Records.

Turner also recorded several film soundtracks for Derek Jarman, including Caravaggio (1986), The Last of England (1988), The Garden (1990), and Jarman's final film Blue (1993). He also composed the complete score for William Eggleston in the Real World (2005) and the David Lynch-produced film, Nadja (1994), as well as Mike Hodges' last two films, Croupier (1998) and I'll Sleep When I'm Dead (2003). Many of his soundtracks are released on CD, mainly on Mute Records, on which he issued three solo albums.

In 2002, Turner was a visiting professor at Braunschweig School of Art in Germany. In 2009, he joined Tilda Swinton on a new film essay shot in Berlin for The Invisible Frame (2009) directed by Cynthia Beatt. In the same year he produced Polly Scattergood's self-titled debut album, Polly Scattergood.

Turner completed music for sculptor, Alyson Shotz, at the Nasher Sculpture Centre, Dallas. In 2010 he composed the music for The Great White Silence, a film by Herbert Ponting. It was restored by the British Film Institute, and released on Blu-ray/DVD. The soundtrack is available from Soleilmoon Recordings.

In 2011, Turner released a triple CD, Soundtracks for Derek, on Optical Sound. It is music composed for an exhibition, "Super 8", by Jarman at the Julia Stoschek Foundation. Mute Records released an album made with the sounds supplied by Espen J. Jorgensen. Also in that year, "Music for Films you should have seen" was released by Optical Sound. This includes music for the only film Jean Genet made, Un Chant D'amour. Turner continued to make music for commercials for water, supermarkets and cancer research.

In 2012, Turner worked with Shiro Takatani, artistic director of dumb type in Kyoto, the BFI in the UK and prepared new sounds. He played concerts in Europe performing both Blue and The Great White Silence, live with the Elysian Quartet.

During 2013, Turner provided the score for The Epic of Everest, a film made in 1924 by Captain John Noel, restored by The British Film Institute and released on Blu-ray. A soundtrack album released on Mute Records won him an Ivor Novello Award.

Simon Turner lives with his wife and two children in London.

== Actor ==
=== Television ===
- Tom's Midnight Garden (3 episodes, 1968) - (as Tom)
- Tom Brown's Schooldays (1971 TV serial)
- The Intruder (1972) TV series
- The Long Chase (13 episodes, 1972)
- The Adventures of Black Beauty (1972)
- Tom's Midnight Garden (3 episodes, 1974) - (as Barty)
- Who Killed Lamb? (1974) (TV)
- Village Hall (1974) TV series
- Kim & Co. (1975) TV series
- Lillie (1978) TV serial
- Stay with Me Till Morning (1981, TV series)
- Neptune's Children (1985) TV series

=== Films ===
- The Big Sleep (1978)
- Caravaggio (1986)
- The Party: Nature Morte (1991)
- The 90 Days (Japan) (1992)
- Loaded (1994)
- Claire Dolan (1998)
- Croupier (1999)
- The End of the Affair (1999)
- Hana wo tsumu shôjo to mushi wo korosu shôjo (2000)

== Discography ==
=== As Simon Turner ===
==== Singles ====
- "Shoeshine Boy" / "17" (UK Records, 1972)
- "Baby (I Gotta Go)" / "Love Around" (UK Records, 1972)
- "Baby (I Gotta Go)" / "I Wanna Love My Life Away" (UK Records, 1972)
- "The Prettiest Star" / "Love Around" (UK Records, 1973)
- "California Revisited" / "Simon Talk" (UK Records, 1973)
- "She Was Just a Young Girl (No Way)" / "I'll Take Your Hand" (UK Records, 1974)
- "Sex Appeal" / "Little Lady" (UK Records, 1974)
- "I've Been a Bad Bad Boy" / "Little Lady" (UK Records, 1974)
- "New York" / "Hello I Am Your Heart" (1975)
- "Could It Really Be" (Ariola Records, 1977)

==== Albums ====
- Simon Turner (UK Records, 1973)
- Simon Turner (Creation Records, 1990)
- Sex Appeal (1992)
- The Many Moods of Simon Turner (1993)
- Revox (1993)

=== As Deux Filles ===
- Silence & Wisdom (1982)
- Double Happiness (1983)
- Space & Time (2016)
- Shadow Farming (2021)

=== As the King of Luxembourg ===
- Royal Bastard (1987)
- Sir (1988)
- Sex Appeal (1992)
- Sweets of Japan (Felicite Records) (2003)

=== As Loveletter ===
- Beethoven Chopin Kitchen Fraud (1999)

=== As Simon Fisher Turner ===
- The Bone of Desire (1985)
- Caravaggio Original Soundtrack (1986–1995)
- The Last of England Original Soundtrack (1987)
- Melancholia Soundtrack (1989)
- Edward II Original Soundtrack (1991)
- The Garden Original Soundtrack (1991)
- I've Heard the Ammonite Murmur (1992)
- Blue (1993)
- Live Blue Roma (The Archaeology of Sound) (1995)
- Nadja (1995)
- Shwarma (1996)
- Loaded Original Soundtrack (1996)
- Still, Moving, Light (1999)
- Oh Venus (1999)
- Eyes Open (1999)
- Travelcard (2000)
- Riviera Faithful (2002)
- Swift (2002)
- Lana Lara Lata (2007)
- Music From Films You Should Have Seen (2009)
- Soundtracks for Derek (2011)
- The Great White Silence Original Soundtrack (2011)
- Berlin Soundscape recording made during the shooting days of the film The Invisible Frame (2012)
- Soundescapes (2012) by SFT and Espen J jorgenson
- The Epic of Everest Original Soundtrack (2014)
- Giraffe (Editions Mego, 2017)
- Care (an album with Klara Lewis in Edition Mego, 2018)
- Instability of the Signal (2024)

=== Film music not released on CD (selection) ===
- Lava (2001)
- I'll Sleep When I'm Dead
- William Eggleston in the Real World
