= The Sun Rising (poem) =

Poem by John Donne

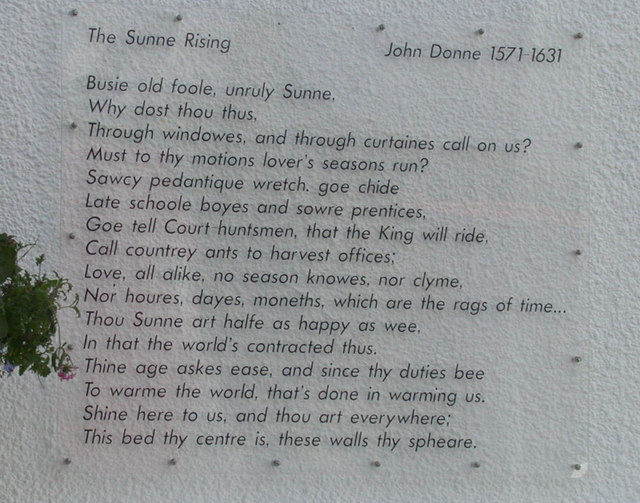
The poem incomplete

The Sun Rising (also known as The Sunne Rising) is a thirty-line poem (a great example of an inverted aubade) with three stanzas published in 1633 by the English poet John Donne. The meter is irregular, ranging from two to six stresses per line in no fixed pattern. The longest lines are at the end of the three stanzas and the rhyme never varies—each stanza runs ABBACDCDEE. Donne's poems were known to be metaphysical with jagged rhythms, dramatic monologues, playful intelligence, and startling images. The poem personifies the sun.

== Content ==
Stanza one begins with the speaker in bed with his lover, complaining about sun's beaming rays. Donne uses expressions such as, "Busy old fool" (line 1) and "Saucy Pedantic Wretch" [perfectionist] (line 5) to describe his annoyance with it. The speaker of the poem questions the sun's motives and yearns for the sun to go away so that he and his lover can stay in bed.

Donne is tapping into human emotion in personifying the sun, and he is exhibiting how beings behave when they are in love with one another. The speaker in the poem believes that, for him and his lover, time is the enemy. He asks, "Must to thy motions lovers' seasons run?" (line 4) or, in other words, 'why must lovers be controlled by the sun?'. The speaker then tells the sun to bother someone else, "go chide late schoolboys and sour prentices, Go tell court huntsmen that the king will ride..." (lines 5-7), and that love knows no season, climate, hour, day, nor month.

In Stanza two, the speaker is saying how the sun believes its beams are strong but he could "eclipse" and "cloud them in a wink" (line 13). Although he can shield his eyes from the sun, he does not want to do that because it means he would be also shielding his eyes from his lover. He says, "But that I would not lose her sight so long" (line 14). The speaker proceeds to reprimand the sun and tells it to set, come back the next day, and tell him "whether both th' Indias of spice and mine be where thou lefst them, or lie here with me" (lines 16-18). He wants the sun to tell him if all the kings, queens, riches and gold of the world are still out there or lying in bed next to him. Towards the end of the stanza the speaker confirms, "Ask for those kings whom thou saw'st yesterday, and thou shalt hear, All here in one bed lay" (lines 19-20), that his lover is above all kings and beside him in bed are all the riches and gold that he could ever want.

Within the last stanza the speaker attempts to settle his anger in praising his lover. His lover is his world and when they are in bed together they are in their own microcosm of bliss. Stating that nothing else is half as important as his lover, the speaker insists "Thine age asks ease, and since thy duties be to warm the world, that's done in warming us. Shine here to us, and thou art everywhere; this bed thy center is, these walls thy sphere" (lines 27-30). Which translates to his worrying about the sun's age and implying that all a sun is good for is warming up the world and its lovers, once it does that then its job is done. His lover is his whole world, and since the sun is shining on the bed composed of these two, then it is also shining on the entire world.

Some commentators draw connections between the poem and the Heliocentric theory. Author Carol Rumens wrote about this connection stating, "Donne must have been well aware of these developments [Copernican Heliocentric theory] when he wrote The Sun Rising. Perhaps it is even reflected in that little unexpected epithet, "unruly" – suggesting the sun itself had challenged the Roman [Catholic Church’s] inquisition," Donne could have also been challenging the inquisition trial and condemnation of Galileo Galilei as a suspected heretic, and the incompatibility of science and religion. The time period and its context, thirty years prior to Donne’s birth, acted as a source of inspiration for John Donne’s writing of The Sun Rising, and perhaps is a critique of the Roman inquisition and counter-reformation movement. The developments in science such as the Heliocentric theory and its relation to Donne’s awareness of this is in his writing of the poem.

== Criticism ==
Some critics call Donne’s words in The Sun Rising ineffective because it lacks logic. Dr. Eric Otto argues that “he is still unsuccessful at convincing critical readers that internal love can symbolically replace the physical world if logic is subordinated to language.” In addition, it may be considered to be unsuccessful in convincing the reader of the power of love. Otto claims that “upon condensing the world around his lover and himself, he calls back those objects that he initially excluded."
