= The Garden (1990 film) =

- Directed by: Derek Jarman
- Written by: Derek Jarman
- Produced by: James Mackay
- Starring: Tilda Swinton; Johnny Mills; Kevin Collins; Spencer Leigh
- Narrated by: Michael Gough
- Cinematography: Derek Jarman; Christopher Hughes; Richard Heslop
- Edited by: Derek Jarman; Peter Cartwright; Kevin Collins
- Music by: Simon Fisher Turner
- Production company: Basilisk Communications
- Distributed by: Artificial Eye
- Release date: 1990
- Running time: 95 minutes
- Country: United Kingdom
- Language: English
- Budget: GBP£380,000

The Garden is a 1990 British arthouse film directed by Derek Jarman and produced by James Mackay for Basilisk Communications, in association with Channel 4, British Screen, and ZDF. The film is loosely based on the story of Christ's crucifixion, except the figure of Christ is replaced with a gay male couple. The film has been seen as an allegory of the suffering gays were going through during the AIDS crisis and their ostracism by most of society. The film was entered into the 17th Moscow International Film Festival.

== Overview ==
Lacking almost any dialogue, the film is shown as Jarman's own musings, which are tempered by the reality of his own mortality— when HIV-positive Jarman made the film he was facing death from AIDS. Jarman reads an elegy to lost friends at the film's end.

The film follows a loving gay couple whose idealistic existence is interrupted when they are arrested, humiliated, tortured and killed. In between this are nonlinear images of religious iconography — a Madonna (Tilda Swinton) who is overexposed and harassed by paparazzi in balaclavas; a trans woman who, to the background soundtrack of a fox hunt is similarly humiliated and shamed by paparazzi and cisgender women; Jesus, who watches the world pass him by; a Judas who is hanged and used as a tool to advertise credit cards; and water dropping from an image of Christ on the crucifix.

Other images include the Twelve Apostles as 12 women in babushkas, sitting at a table by the seaside as they run their fingers around the edges of wine glasses to create an ominous hum.

The film addresses what it meant to be viewed as queer in the 20th century, highlighting Section 28, which Jarman opposed from the start. The film is augmented with unusually tinted shots of beaches and bizarre changes between classical, Cypriot and other types of music and sound.

== Cast ==
- Tilda Swinton as Madonna
- Johnny Mills as Lover
- Philip MacDonald as Joseph
- Pete Lee-Wilson as Devil
- Spencer Leigh as Mary Magdalene / Adam
- Jody Graber as Young Boy
- Roger Cook as Christ
- Kevin Collins as Lover
- Jack Birkett as Pontius (as Orlando)

Other cast members; Dawn Archibald, Milo Bell, Vernon Dobtcheff, Michael Gough, Mirabelle La Manchega and Jessica Martin.

== Production ==
The film has a soundtrack by Simon Fisher-Turner and production design by Derek Brown.

== Home media ==
The Garden is available on DVD and Blu-ray.

== Reception ==
On Rotten Tomatoes, The Garden has a 100% approval rating, based on six reviews, with an average rating of 8.75/10.

Janet Maslin of The New York Times in 1991, thought that the film was an "assemblage of turbulent images" and "is a peculiar blend of reflectiveness and fury". It "has a burning, kaleidoscopic energy" and "genuineness and pathos of Mr. Jarman's own situation".

Time Out Magazine wrote, "Jarman contemplates his own mortality (he is HIV-positive), and imagines that the end of the world is nigh. Touching, intense, sometimes unexpectedly amusing, sometimes agonising, and always achingly sincere."

Pat Brown wrote in Slant Magazine that "the film's lo-fi, Super 8 images, through the use of color filters and compositing effects, evoke a trajectory of paradise lost and innocence persecuted." Brown went on to say that "despite being guided by a dream logic that's nightmarish more often than not, the film isn’t oppressive."
