= The Last of England (film) =

- Directed by: Derek Jarman
- Written by: Derek Jarman
- Produced by: James Mackay; Don Boyd
- Starring: Tilda Swinton; Spencer Leigh; Spring; Nigel Terry
- Cinematography: Derek Jarman, Christopher Hughes, Richard Heslop, Cerith Wyn Evans
- Edited by: Derek Jarman, Peter Cartwright, Angus Cook
- Music by: Simon Fisher Turner; Andy Gill; Marianne Faithfull; Mayo Thompson; Diamanda Galás; Barry Adamson
- Distributed by: Blue Dolphin Film Distributors
- Release dates: August 1987 (Edinburgh International Film Festival); 14 February 1988 (Berlin International Film Festival)
- Running time: 91 minutes
- Country: United Kingdom
- Language: English
- Budget: GBP£276,000

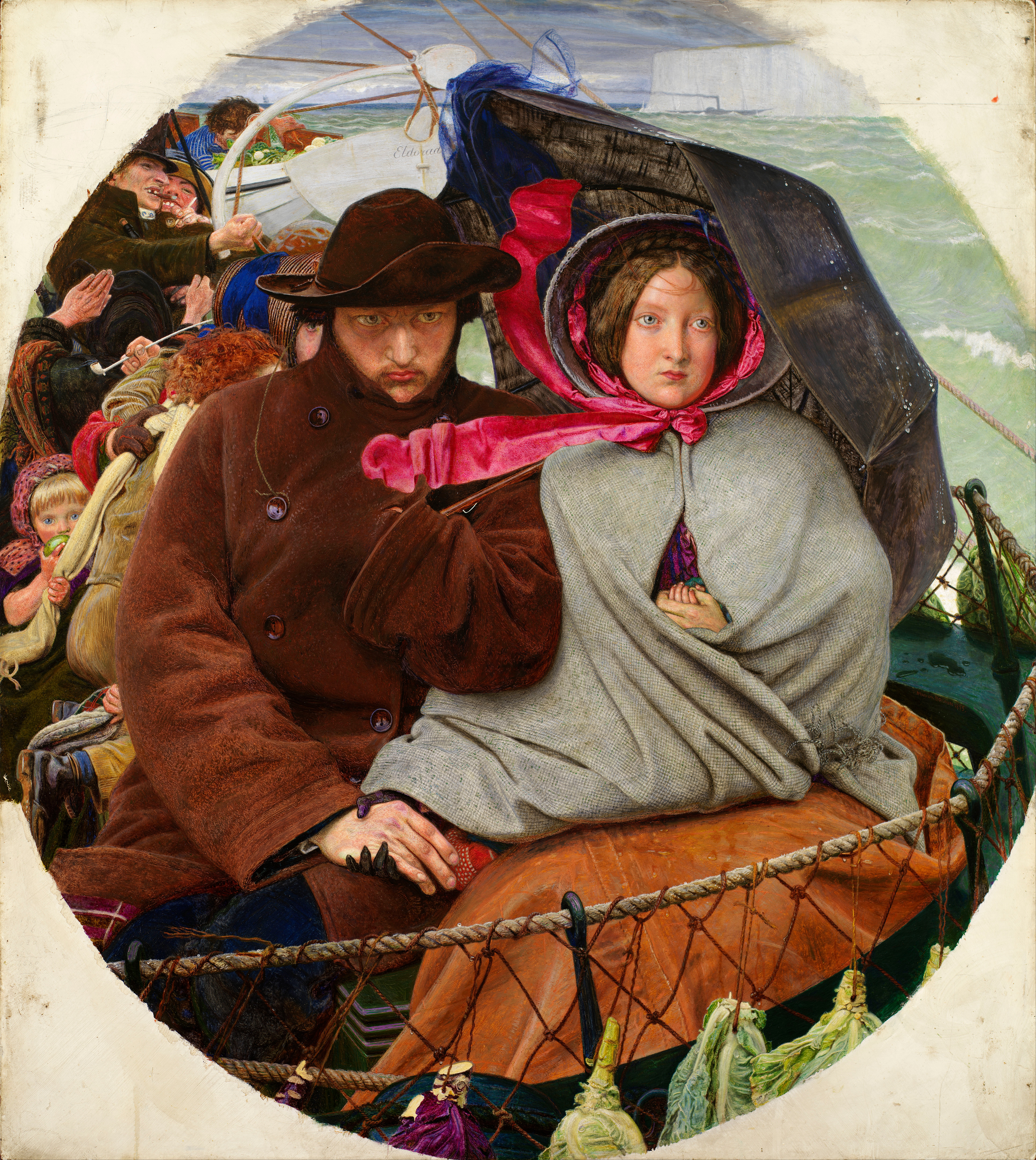
The Last of England, the painting from which the film derives its name

The Last of England is a 1987 British arthouse film directed by Derek Jarman and starring Tilda Swinton.

It is a poetic depiction of what Jarman felt was the loss of traditional English culture in the 1980s and his anger about Thatcher's England, including the formation of Section 28 of the Local Government Act. It is named after The Last of England, a painting by Ford Madox Brown.

Jarman wrote a book, with the same title, to accompany the film.

== Cast ==
- Tilda Swinton as The Maid
- Spencer Leigh as Soldier / Various roles
- 'Spring' Mark Adley as Spring / Various roles
- Gerrard McArthur as Various roles
- Jonny Phillips (credited as Jonathan Phillips) as Various roles
- Gay Gaynor as Various roles
- Matthew Hawkins as Junkyard Guy
- Nigel Terry as Narrator (voice)

== Production ==
=== Development and conception ===
Jarman conceived The Last of England as a film “about England” rather than a conventional narrative, framing it as a response to what he saw as cultural decay, political repression, and institutional control in contemporary Britain.

He described the film as having no narrative, although it contains a silent love story expressed through images rather than dialogue. Jarman rejected dialogue-driven cinema, arguing that meaning arises from the act of filming itself rather than from scripts or spoken language.

Jarman further characterised the project as a form of resistance, describing the act of making the film as “war,” and insisting that even failure would represent a victory against institutional constraints.

=== Casting and performance ===
There was no formal casting process for The Last of England. Jarman described the performances as emerging spontaneously and stated that he did not worry if performers failed to appear, continuing filming with whoever was present.

One performer, Spring, left partway through production after deciding to remain in the United States. Jarman subsequently contacted Spencer Leigh, who had appeared as Gerusalemme in Caravaggio (1986), and continued filming the second half of the film, which he described as more structured.

Jarman gave minimal direction to performers, stating that most scenes “directed themselves,” and embraced improvisation as a central method.

=== Filming ===
The film was shot primarily on Super 8, which Jarman described as a “free” format that allowed spontaneity and independence from institutional and financial control, in contrast to 35mm filmmaking.

Filming took place across locations associated with industrial decline and redevelopment, particularly in London’s docklands. Jarman filmed in Rotherhithe, near his former studio at Butler’s Wharf, and along the Thames from Bankside to Tower Bridge, documenting the demolition of warehouses, historic streets, and architectural features in favour of concrete redevelopment and luxury housing.

Filming proceeded in a largely improvised manner. Jarman noted that cameramen sometimes wandered off with actors, filming independently, and that he accepted whatever material emerged. A more structured shoot took place over one week in November at the Royal Victoria Docks, within which improvisation continued.

Additional locations included Millennium Wharf, the old Spillers buildings, Beckton’s industrial ruins, and Liverpool, where 1960s housing developments were described by Jarman as hostile to residents. He linked these landscapes to earlier images of militarised domestic spaces at RAF Abingdon and RAF Lossiemouth, creating visual continuity between urban desolation and post-war military architecture.

At Millennium Wharf, four cameras were used, operated by Cerith Wyn Evans, Richard Heslop, Chris Hughes, and Jarman himself. The shoot included lighting, catering, and a costume and props department run by Christopher Hobbs and Sandy Powell, both of whom had worked with Jarman on Caravaggio. Producer James MacKay coordinated the production, which Jarman described as loosely organised and responsive rather than pre-planned.

One of the film's most famous scenes is of Tilda Swinton as a bride mourning her executed husband. The scene was shot near the director's home on the beach of Dungeness, Kent.

=== Archival and family footage ===
The Last of England incorporates extensive family home movies dating back to the late 1920s, filmed by Jarman’s grandfather, Harry Jarman, depicting holidays in Bexhill-on-Sea, domestic gatherings, and pre-war family life.

Additional colour footage was shot by Jarman’s father, an RAF officer and photographer, including wartime material and post-war scenes at RAF Abingdon in 1948, when Jarman was six years old.

=== Post-production ===
Jarman deliberately retained scratches, dust, and out-of-focus images, describing these imperfections as essential to the film’s form. He compared this aesthetic to the deliberate flaws introduced by Japanese master potters to disrupt formal perfection.

== Soundtrack ==
Although the film contains no spoken dialogue, it is not silent. The soundtrack was composed by Simon Fisher Turner and structured around the Violin Sonatas of Johann Sebastian Bach.

The film includes four written voice-over texts by Jarman, delivered by Nigel Terry in a deliberately flat broadcast-style monotone. Jarman described the soundtrack as a “palimpsest,” layering music, voice, and sound.

== Themes ==
Themes of national decline, institutional violence, memory, and resistance recur throughout The Last of England. Jarman employed biblical and apocalyptic imagery to articulate his vision of England as a culture in crisis.

Despite its bleak imagery, Jarman rejected the label of pessimism, arguing that the act of making the film itself represented optimism through defiance and engagement.

== Release ==
The Last of England opened at the Prince Charles Cinema, off Leicester Square, but closed within a week.

The film was screened out of competition in the Forum section of the 38th Berlin International Film Festival, where all three screenings were reportedly full. It received the Teddy Award and the annual award of the Confédération Internationale des Cinémas d’Art et d’Essai, recognising its artistic quality and originality.

== Reception ==
Critical response to The Last of England was sharply divided.

Trevor Johnston, writing in The List, described the film as “a piece of dynamic cinematic poetry.” Ian Bell wrote in The Scotsman: “I suspect and I hope that this is a great film.” A critic for The Village Voice described the film as “wrenchingly beautiful” and praised it as one of the few commanding works of personal cinema in the late 1980s.

Other critics were less favourable. William Russell, in the Glasgow Herald, dismissed the film as “the biggest ragbag of secondhand, exhausted images ever collected together in one film.” Writing in The Monthly Film Bulletin, Steve Jenkins argued that the film added little to ideas Jarman had already explored more succinctly in earlier work. The New York Times described it as “the longest and gloomiest rock video ever made.”

Its screening at the New York Film Festival had mass walkouts.

On Rotten Tomatoes, the film holds an approval rating of 60%, based on ten reviews.

== Awards ==
Derek Jarman received the 1988 Teddy Award at the 38th Berlin International Film Festival for the film. And Tilda Swinton received the jury prize for her performance.

== Soundtrack album ==
Two versions of the soundtrack album were released on the Mute Records label. The LP has one side ("Bombers") by Simon Turner, and the other ("Diplomat") by a variety of performers, including Mayo Thompson with Albert Oehlen and Tilda Swinton; Andy Gill with Dean Garcia, Barry Adamson and Martin McCarrick, Brian Gulland and Diamanda Galas. The CD version includes all of this material and a third section, "Dead to the World", primarily by Turner.
