= Derek Jarman =

British film director and artist (1942–1994)

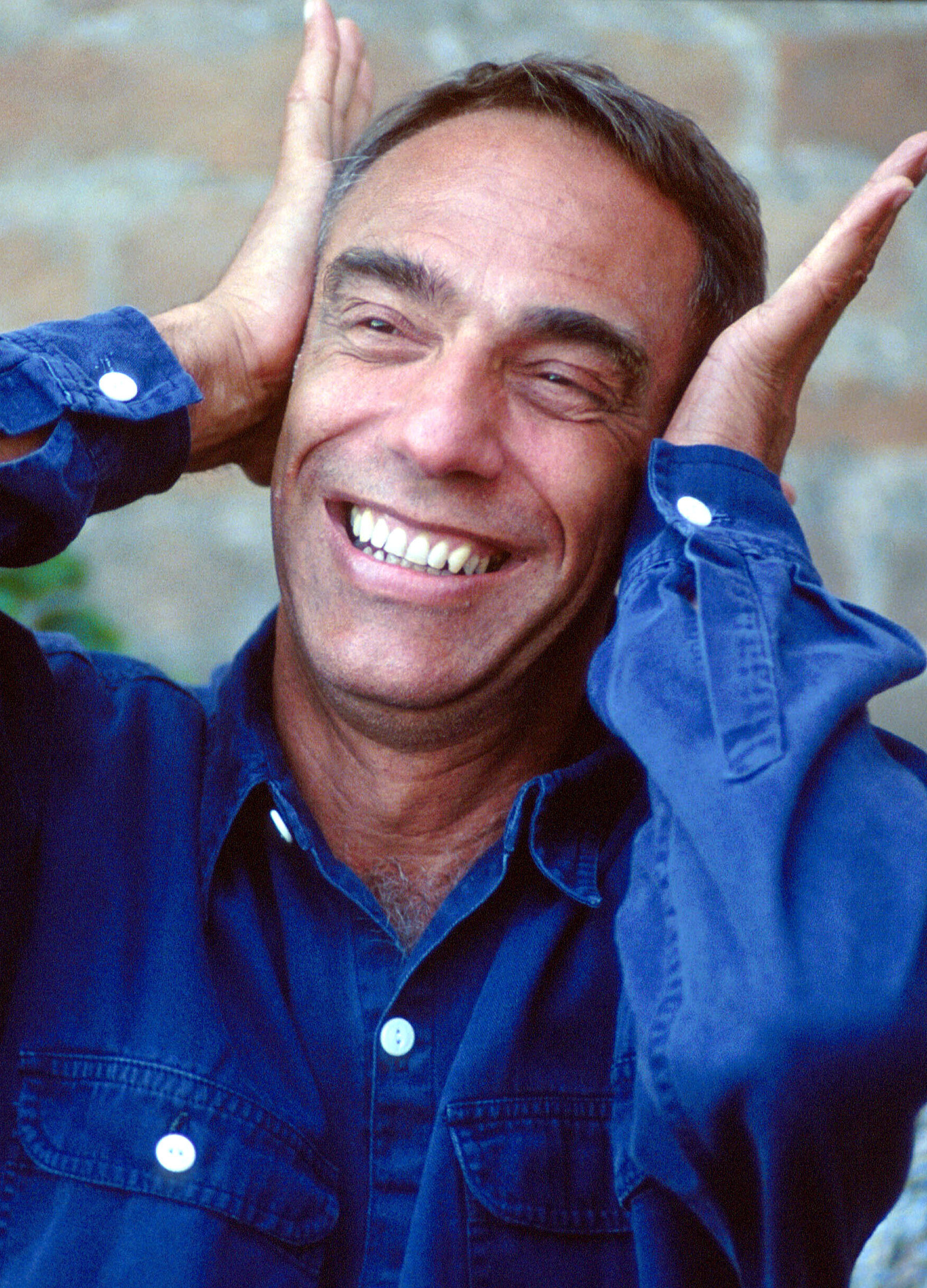
- Jarman during the 1991 Venice Film Festival
- Born: 31 January 1942; Northwood, Middlesex, England
- Died: 19 February 1994 (aged 52); St Bartholomew's Hospital, London, England
- Resting place: St Clement Churchyard, Old Romney, Kent
- Education: King's College London (BA); University College London (GrDip)
- Occupations: Film director; gay rights activist; gardener; set designer
- Years active: 1970–1994
- Notable work: Sebastiane (1976); Jubilee (1977); The Tempest (1979); Caravaggio (1986); The Last of England (1988); War Requiem (1989); Edward II (1991); Wittgenstein (1993); Blue (1993)
- Style: New Queer Cinema
- Partner: Keith Collins (1987–1994, his death)

Michael Derek Elworthy Jarman (31 January 1942 – 19 February 1994) was an English artist, film maker, stage designer, writer, gardener, and gay rights activist, regarded as one of the most influential figures associated with the new queer cinema. Trained originally as a painter, he moved into stage and production design in the late 1960s, including work on Ken Russell's controversial historical 1971 film The Devils, before turning to filmmaking as a director.

Jarman made his directorial debut with Sebastiane (1976), a Latin-language film depicting the martyrdom of Saint Sebastian through overt homoerotic imagery. The film established many of the characteristics of his work: an openly queer perspective, historical and literary source material treated anachronistically, and a willingness to court controversy. He went on to direct a body of unconventional films including the punk-inflected Jubilee (1978), the stylised biographical drama Caravaggio (1986), and the politically charged adaptation Edward II (1991).

Consistently working outside mainstream British film production, Jarman often struggled to secure financing and developed a distinctive low-budget, experimental practice, frequently using Super 8 film and video. Diagnosed with HIV in 1986, Jarman became one of the first public figures in Britain to speak openly about living with the disease. Throughout his career, Jarman was outspoken about homosexuality, his public fight for gay rights, and his personal struggle with HIV. His final feature film, Blue (1993), consisting of an unchanging blue screen accompanied by a layered soundtrack, was released four months before his death from an AIDS-related illness.

== Early life ==
Jarman was born at the Royal Victoria Nursing Home in Northwood, Middlesex, England, the son of Elizabeth Evelyn (née Puttock) (Note: Elizabeth Puttock's mother, Moselle, a daughter of Isaac Frederic Reuben, had Jewish ancestry) and Lancelot Elworthy Jarman. His father was a Royal Air Force officer, born in New Zealand. He rose to the rank of air commodore, and his last post before retiring in 1958 was as AOA of RAF Coastal Command. In Jarman's early years, the family was itinerant.

After a prep school education at Hordle House School, Jarman went on to board at Canford School in Dorset, an experience he found stifling. Under the guidance of the school's art master, Robin Noscoe, Jarman developed a lasting interest in painting, which he later characterised as a form of "self-defence". Although he had been offered a place with the Slade School of Fine Art at University College London, Jarman deferred entry after agreeing with his father that he would first pursue an academic degree. He studied English, History and the History of Art at King's College London between 1960 and 1963. This was followed by four years at the Slade.

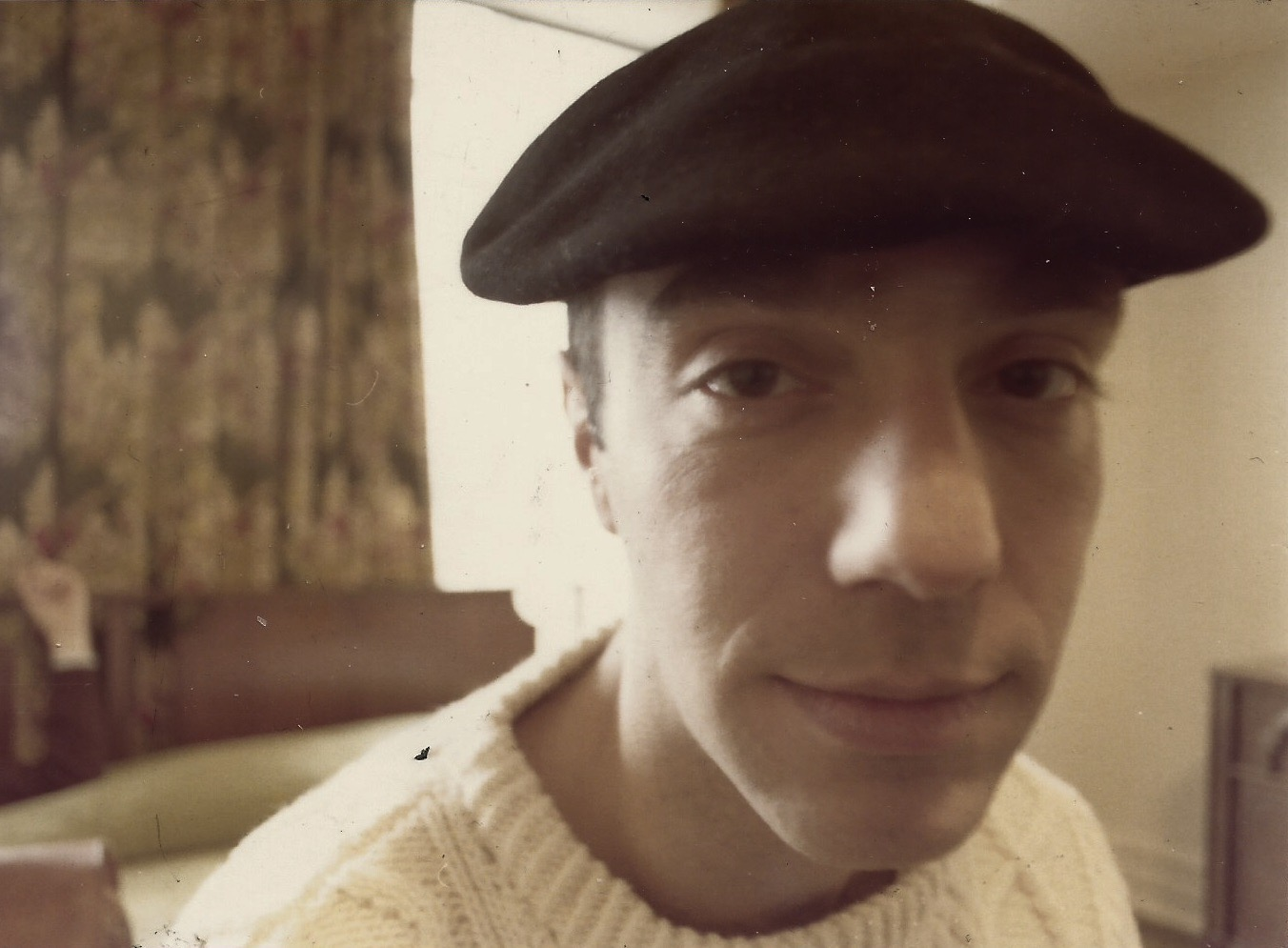
Jarman photographed in 1976 by former roommate and fellow artist Keith Milow

From 1966 to 1969, Jarman rented a two-room flat on the top floor of 60 Liverpool Road, London, sharing rooms during the last year with fellow artist Keith Milow. In August 1969, he moved to Upper Ground, opposite Blackfriars Bridge, the first of a series of warehouses in the London Docklands. In his own words:

"an exhilarating change after seven years in cramped Georgian terrace houses and basements [..] the warehouse allowed me to slip quietly away from the 'scene' which for five years had been the centre of my life – and had now exhausted itself – and establish my own idiosyncratic mode of living".

In the 1970s, Jarman had a studio at Butler's Wharf, a riverside complex that housed a number of artists and designers. Among them was the sculptor and performance artist Andrew Logan, whose studio hosted the Alternative Miss World contest. Jarman took part in the event and, appearing as Miss Crêpe Suzette, won the 1975 contest before a judging panel that included the painter David Hockney.

== Career ==
=== The Devils and early Super 8 films ===
Jarman began his career as a designer for the stage. His first major professional commission was designing sets and costumes for Jazz Calendar (1968), a ballet choreographed by Frederick Ashton, whose cast included Rudolf Nureyev. A chance meeting brought Jarman to the attention of the filmmaker Ken Russell, who invited him to design the sets for The Devils (1971). The production design included the enormous white-brick town of Loudon, constructed on the back-lot of Pinewood studios, which Jarman described as the studio's largest set since Cleopatra (1963). Despite the film's hostile critical reception, many reviewers praised Jarman's work; a scathing review in Time Out nevertheless pointed out "Jarman's sets ... still look terrific". Jarman would go on to collaborate again with Russell on Savage Messiah (1972)

During this period, Jarman began making films after being lent a camera by a friend. His earliest works were experimental Super 8 short films, made largely with friends. These films explored recurring interests in ritual and magic, documented aspects of gay subculture, and experimented formally. One of the first of these films was Studio Bankside, an experimental documentation of Jarman's warehouse studio and the community that inhabited it. At the space, Jarman also hosted informal film screenings and parties, at which feature films, underground cinema, and Super 8 works — including his own — were shown.

=== Feature films of the 1970s ===
Jarman made his mainstream narrative filmmaking debut with Sebastiane (1976), about the martyrdom of Saint Sebastian. This was one of the first British films to feature positive images of gay sexuality; its dialogue was entirely in Latin. Music for the film was composed by Brian Eno. Sebastiane premiered at the Locarno Film Festival and subsequently opened at the Gate Cinema in London, where it enjoyed a well-attended run.

Inspired by meeting the punk icon Jordan, Jarman's next film was Jubilee (1978), in which Queen Elizabeth I of England is seen to be transported forward in time to a desolate and brutal wasteland ruled by her twentieth-century namesake. Jubilee has been described as "Britain's only decent punk film", and featured punk groups and figures such as Jayne County of Wayne County & the Electric Chairs, Toyah Willcox, Adam and the Ants and The Slits.

This was followed in 1979 by an adaptation of Shakespeare's The Tempest. The film was shot largely inside Stoneleigh Abbey in Warwickshire, and Jarman made changes to Shakespeare's text. The then 75-year-old singer Elisabeth Welch (credited only as "A Goddess") appears, performing her signature song "Stormy Weather".

=== Experimental films and music videos ===
Jarman's next major project was a film on the life of the Italian painter Caravaggio, a screenplay he first began writing in 1978. The project proved difficult to finance, and its development extended over several years. In the intervening period, Jarman continued to produce short and medium-length films, including Imagining October (1984), which drew parallels he perceived between Stalin's Russia and Thatcher's Britain. The film ran for eight weeks as an installation at Tate Britain. During this period Jarman met James Mackay, who became a key collaborator and producer on his subsequent work.

At the same time, Jarman began making music videos, approaching the form in a characteristically idiosyncratic way. His first was Broken English: Three Songs by Marianne Faithfull, which comprised visual interpretations of "Witch's Song", "The Ballad of Lucy Jordan" and the title track "Broken English". At a time when music videos were still relatively uncommon, the production of a single twelve-minute work spanning three songs was highly unusual. Jarman would go on to make music videos for artists including the Smiths and Pet Shop Boys.

Frustrated by the formality of 35mm film production and by the prolonged periods of inactivity associated with institutional funding — the production of Caravaggio would ultimately span eight years — Jarman and Mackay produced the feature The Angelic Conversation (1985) as a means of circumventing conventional production methods. The film was shot on Super 8 and video formats and later blown up to 35mm for exhibition. Its imagery is accompanied by the voice of Judi Dench reciting Shakespeare's sonnets. The film featured Toby Mott and other members of the Grey Organisation, a radical artist collective.

=== Caravaggio and controversy ===
Released in 1986, Caravaggio involved Channel 4 in funding and distribution; it was funded via the British Film Institute, for whom Colin MacCabe acted as executive producer. It marked Jarman's return to the narrative period film, though the work retained the experimentation and anachronism characteristic of his earlier features.

The film includes gay sexuality, employs narrative ambiguity, and recreates works by Caravaggio as staged tableaux. It was entered in the 36th Berlin International Film Festival, where it won a Silver Bear for an outstanding single achievement (visual conception), awarded to Gabriel Beristain. Caravaggio also marked the beginning of Jarman's collaboration with Tilda Swinton.

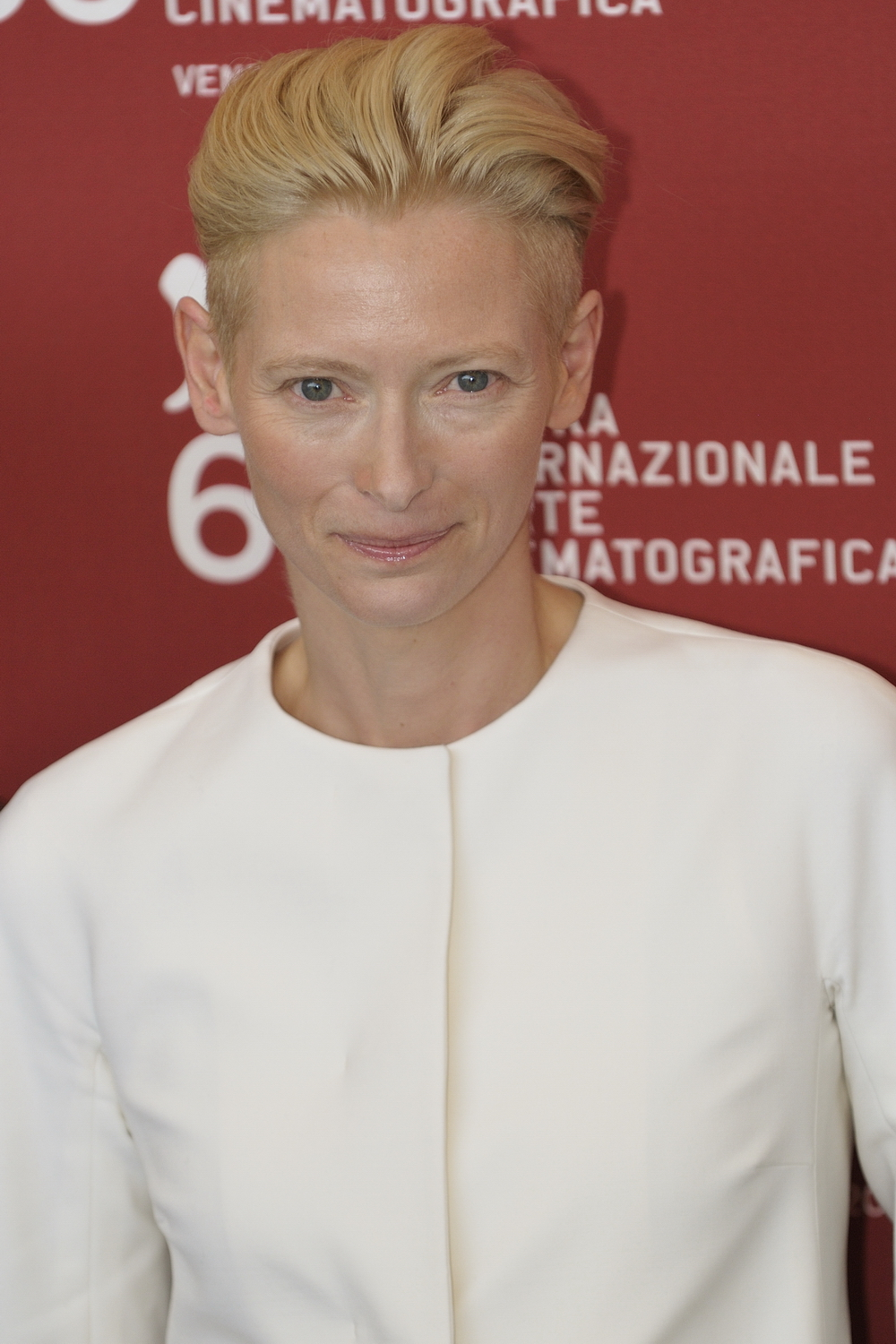
Jarman collaborator Tilda Swinton at the 2009 Venice International Film Festival

At the end of 1985, the critic Michael O'Pray had organised a touring retrospective of Jarman's work entitled Of Angels and Apocalypse. Shortly afterwards, Jarman's three feature films to date were broadcast on Channel 4 as part of a season presented by David Robinson. The screenings generated controversy. Mary Whitehouse petitioned the Director of Public Prosecutions to bring charges against the Independent Broadcasting Authority (IBA) for permitting the broadcasts, while Jubilee and Sebastiane were repeatedly cited in relation to the so-called "video nasties" bill. Winston Churchill wrote to The Times criticising the IBA, and the film director Michael Winner accused Jarman of making pornography.

=== HIV and further features ===
In December 1986, Jarman learned that he was HIV positive. Against medical advice, he informed friends of his diagnosis and soon afterwards publicly disclosed his HIV status, becoming one of the first public figures in Britain to do so. From this point he adopted a more outspoken role in addressing the impact of the AIDS epidemic on the gay community. Already angered by what he regarded as the inadequacy of the government's response to the crisis, Jarman became increasingly involved in gay rights activism following the Thatcher government's proposed Clause 28, which sought to prohibit the "promotion" of homosexuality in schools. Passed into law in 1988 as Section 28, the legislation became a catalyst for a period of political engagement by Jarman.

Jarman's next feature, The Last of England (1987), was, among other things, an angry film. As with The Angelic Conversation — but on a larger and more ambitious scale — the film was made without a script and shot primarily on Super 8 film. The Last of England told the death of a country, ravaged by its own internal decay and the economic restructuring of Thatcher's government.

In 1989, Jarman's film War Requiem, produced by Don Boyd, brought Laurence Olivier out of retirement for what would be Olivier's last screen performance. The film uses Benjamin Britten's eponymous anti-war requiem as its soundtrack and juxtaposes violent footage of war with the mass for the dead and the passionate humanist poetry of Wilfred Owen.

=== Final films ===
Jarman's next feature, The Garden (1990), was shot largely around his garden on the shingle beach at Dungeness. Loosely structured around the Passion of Jesus, the film was conceived as a collaborative project and shot on a mixture of 16mm and Super 8 film. During production Jarman became seriously ill; the film was largely edited without his direct involvement. The Garden was entered into the 17th Moscow International Film Festival, which Jarman described as "the first official performance of a gay movie in the Soviet Union".

This was followed by an adaptation of Christopher Marlowe's play Edward II, which recounts the reign of the English king and the political crisis that follows his relationship with his favourite, Piers Gaveston. Jarman emphasised the play's queer dimensions, explicitly depicting Edward and Gaveston as lovers and framing the conspiracy against them as the actions of a hostile and homophobic establishment. Produced by Working Title and the BBC for the latter's Screen Two series, Edward II (1991) was made on the largest budget of Jarman's career to that point. The film features a performance of "Ev'ry Time We Say Goodbye" by Annie Lennox. The previous year, Jarman had been slated to direct the song's music video as part of the Red Hot + Blue project, but was too ill to film; as a tribute, the video features family film footage of Jarman's childhood.

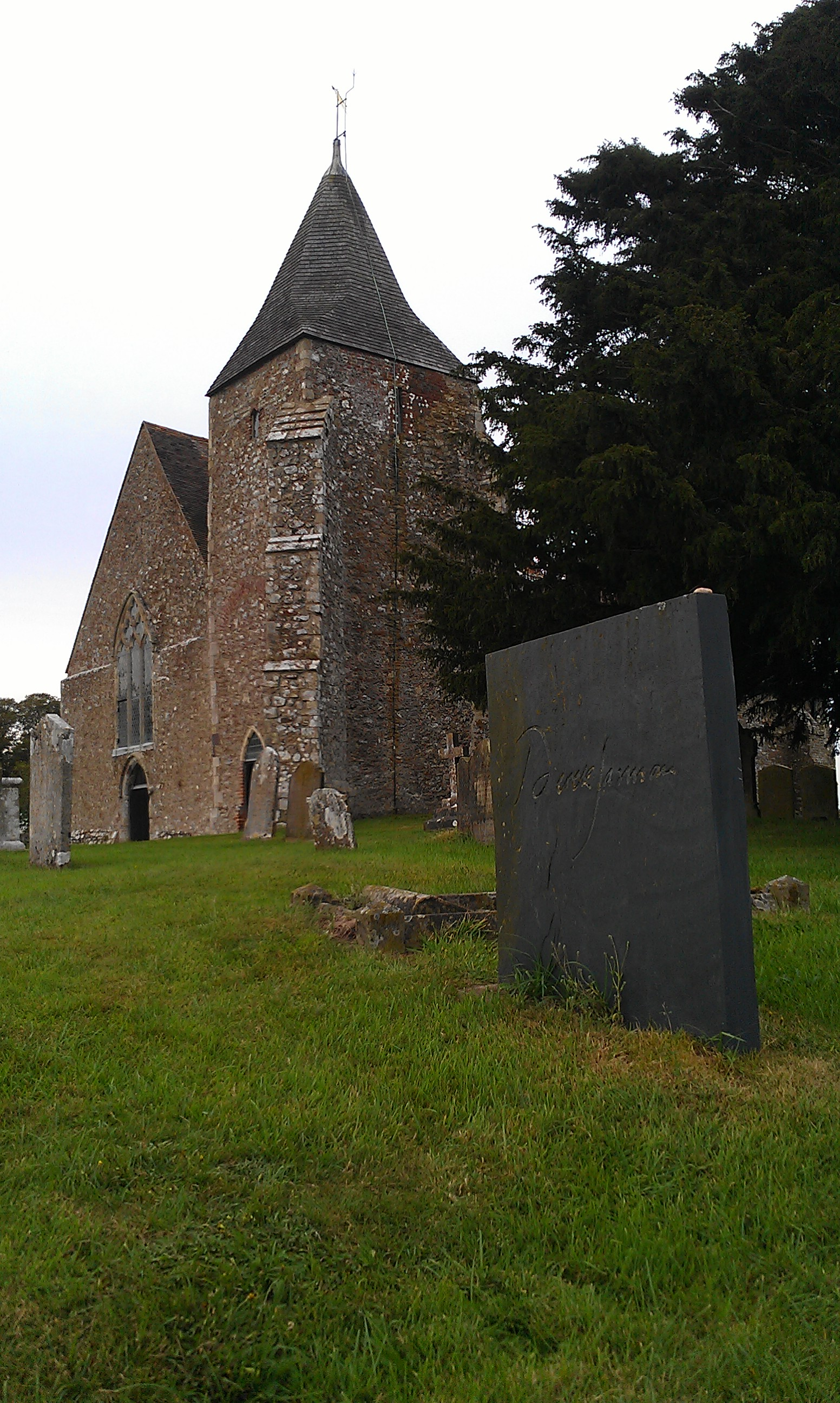
Jarman's headstone in the graveyard of St Clement's Church, Old Romney

Jarman's next film, Wittgenstein (1993), was commissioned as part of a series of films on the lives and ideas of philosophers, produced by Tariq Ali for Channel 4. The original screenplay based on the life of the philosopher Ludwig Wittgenstein, written by the literary critic Terry Eagleton, was extensively rewritten by Jarman during pre-production and filming, resulting in a radical shift in tone and structure, although much of Eagleton's dialogue was retained. Rather than unfolding in a naturalistic setting, the film is staged against a black backdrop, with actors and symbolic props arranged in an abstract, theatrical space, reflecting a consciously Brechtian approach.

By the time of his 1993 film Blue, Jarman was losing his sight and dying of AIDS-related complications. Blue consists of a single shot of International Klein Blue filling the screen, as background to a soundtrack composed by Simon Fisher Turner, and featuring original music by Coil and other artists, in which Jarman describes his life and vision. When it was shown on British television, Channel 4 carried the image whilst the soundtrack was broadcast simultaneously on BBC Radio 3. Blue was unveiled at the 1993 Venice Biennale with Jarman in attendance and subsequently entered the collections of the Walker Art Institute; Centre Georges Pompidou, MoMA and Tate. His final work as a film-maker was the film Glitterbug, made for the Arena slot on BBC Two, and broadcast shortly after Jarman's death.

=== Painting ===
Jarman studied painting at the Slade from 1963 to 1967. Within two terms, although still producing semi-abstract paintings, he was increasingly drawn to projects that mixed disciplines, foreshadowing the multimedia practice that would later encompass collage, found objects, scrapbooks, film and design.

In 1966 a selection of his student work was exhibited at the Rimmell Gallery, and in 1967 he was included in the Young Contemporaries exhibition at the Tate, where he won the Peter Stuyvesant Foundation Prize. During this period he worked primarily in oil painting as well as mixed-media assemblage. In February 1969, Jarman had his first solo exhibition at the Lisson Gallery, showing fourteen landscapes, ballet designs and, in the basement space, what was described as an "environmental and additive sculpture".

Although increasingly known for his filmmaking, Jarman continued to paint throughout his career. In 1986 he was shortlisted for the Turner Prize. Between 1986 and 1987 he produced a large number of small paintings embedding pieces of glass and found objects into thick black tar. In 1989, at the Third Eye Centre in Glasgow, he created an installation featuring a bed surrounded by barbed wire and pasted with homophobic newspaper headlines, with two apparently naked men asleep within it.

In 1991, with the assistance of Peter Fillingham and Karl Lydon, Jarman produced an installation for an exhibition at the Design Museum exploring the relationship between designers and consumers. The work recreated the garden at Prospect Cottage against a large photographic backdrop of its Dungeness setting.

In February 1992 the Kelvingrove Art Gallery and Museum in Glasgow mounted an exhibition of his assemblages and recent landscapes titled At Your Own Risk, which included AIDS-related works incorporating condoms, pill boxes and crucifixes. The same year he produced the Queer series, exhibited at the Manchester Art Gallery, characterised by thick paint surfaces incised with politically charged words and phrases.

In his final years, despite severe deterioration of his eyesight due to AIDS-related illness, Jarman continued to paint with assistance from Piers Clemmet and Karl Lydon in the studio of Richard Salmon. Late exhibitions included Queer at Manchester City Art Gallery (1992) and Evil Queen: The Last Paintings at the Whitworth Art Gallery in 1994.

=== Writing ===
Jarman's early written works included the story Through the Billboard Promised Land Without Ever Stopping, a picaresque adventure following a blind protagonist known as King and his valet John on a journey across a mythical America. Written in 1971, the story was not published until 2022. In 1972, Jarman published A Finger in the Fishes Mouth, a collection of poetry written in his early twenties. It is thought that Jarman destroyed the majority of copies; the collection was not widely accessible until a facsimile edition was published by Sparrow Press in 2014.

Jarman's first widely circulated book was Dancing Ledge (1984), an autobiographical work which recounts his life up to the age of forty and reflects on gay life in London from the 1960s to the 1980s. It was written at the suggestion of Nicholas Ward-Jackson, as a way to sustain Jarman's energy through the difficult pre-production of Caravaggio. Although the book uses a diary dated format, its entries were written and compiled retrospectively. Its cover featured a mask of Jarman's face made by his frequent collaborator Christopher Hobbs.

To accompany the release of his long-awaited Caravaggio, Jarman published a book combining the film's script with diary elements and more than a hundred commissioned photographs by Gerald Incandela, Derek Jarman's Caravaggio (1986). He subsequently published books to accompany the majority of his feature films, including War Requiem (1989), Queer Edward II (1991), Wittgenstein (1993) and Blue (1993). His 1987 book The Last of England – later retitled Kicking the Pricks – also included reflections on The Angelic Conversation and Imagining October.

In 1991, Jarman published the diary Modern Nature. Combining observations of his home and garden in Dungeness with reflections on his personal life, filmmaking and experience of living with HIV, it would become Jarman's best-known book. The book's title was suggested by a conversation with the artist Maggi Hambling.

Written partly in response to a public controversy following a review of Edward II by Evening Standard critic Alexander Walker, At Your Own Risk (1992) addressed the pressures Jarman had experienced as a gay man and the homophobia of contemporary British society. It was followed by Chroma (1994), a book on colour, and Derek Jarman's Garden (1995), which featured photographs by Howard Sooley and was published posthumously. Jarman's final journals, covering the period 1991 to 1994, were published in 2000 as Smiling in Slow Motion.

=== Stage design ===
Jarman worked as a stage designer throughout his career. In 1968 his designs for Jazz Calendar attracted the attention of John Gielgud, who invited him to design a production of Don Giovanni. While Jazz Calendar was widely praised, the subsequent Don Giovanni production received a comparatively poor critical response.

In 1982 Jarman collaborated again with Ken Russell on a production of Igor Stravinsky’s The Rake's Progress for the Teatro Comunale in Florence. In 1988 he directed Sylvano Bussotti’s opera L'Ispirazione, first staged in Florence. Jarman also directed the 1989 concert tour by Pet Shop Boys, a theatrical production incorporating costume and specially shot films to accompany individual songs.

== Last years and death ==
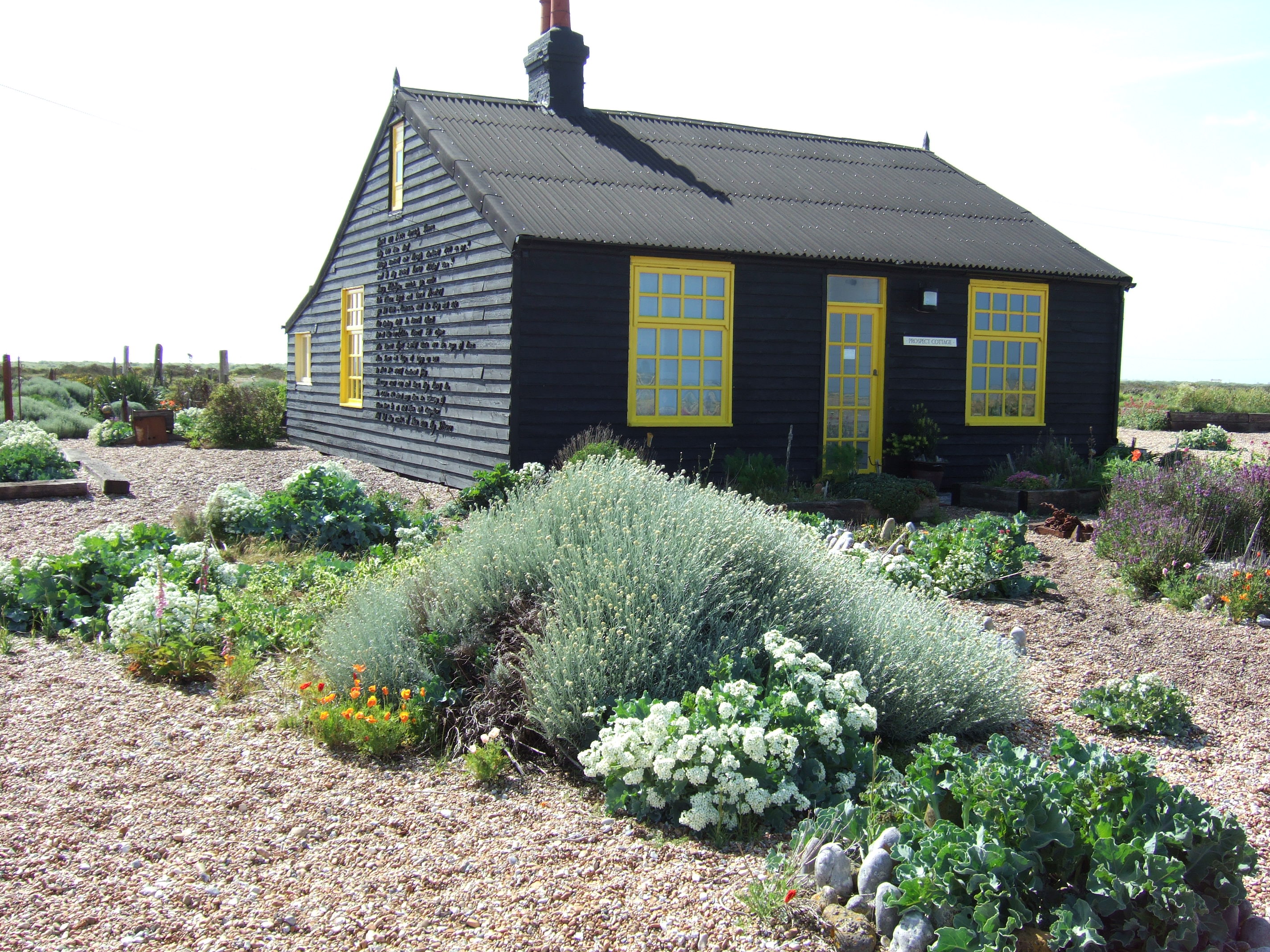
Jarman's garden at Prospect Cottage, Dungeness, May 2007

On 22 December 1986, Jarman was diagnosed as HIV positive and discussed his condition in public. His illness prompted him to move to Prospect Cottage, Dungeness, in Kent, near the nuclear power station. In 1994, he died of an AIDS-related illness in London, aged 52. He was an atheist.

In the later years of his life Jarman created a distinctive shingle garden at Prospect Cottage in Dungeness, Kent, in the shadow of Dungeness nuclear power station. The timber cottage, weatherproofed with tar, bears painted text from John Donne’s 1633 poem The Sun Rising. The garden was composed of flotsam gathered from the beach and salt-tolerant plants arranged against the shingle landscape, and has since been the subject of several books.

In his last years, Jarman was emotionally and practically supported by the companionship of Keith Collins (1963–2018), a young man whom he had met in 1987. While they were not sexually involved (Collins had his own partner), the relationship became essential for both of them. Jarman left Prospect Cottage to Collins. Jarman is buried in the graveyard at St Clement's Church, Old Romney, Kent.

== Legacy ==
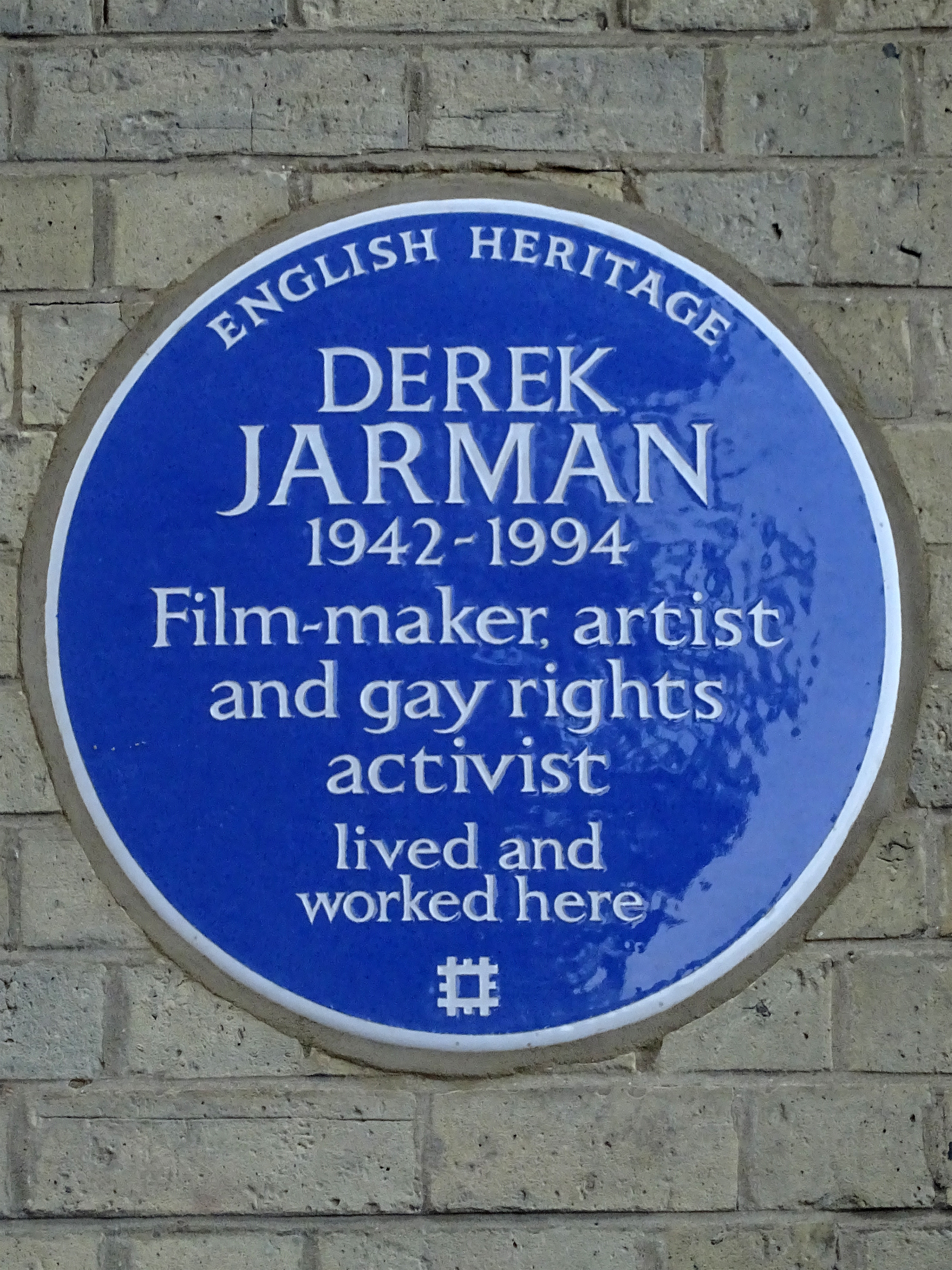
Blue plaque at Butler's Wharf

A blue plaque commemorating Jarman was unveiled at Butler's Wharf in London on 19 February 2019, the 25th anniversary of his death.

=== Retrospectives and exhibitions ===
In 2014 the British Film Institute mounted Queer Pagan Punk, the largest retrospective of Jarman's films ever presented in the United Kingdom, marking the twentieth anniversary of his death.

From 15 November 2019 to 23 February 2020, the Irish Museum of Modern Art presented Derek Jarman: Protest!, a major retrospective exhibition curated by Seán Kissane. In 2021 the exhibition was re-presented at Manchester Art Gallery, curated by Fiona Corridan and Jon Savage.

In 2020 the Garden Museum in London staged Derek Jarman: My Garden's Boundaries Are the Horizon, which recreated elements of the garden at Prospect Cottage and displayed objects from Jarman's estate.

=== Prospect Cottage ===
In 2020 a public campaign led by Art Fund raised £3.5 million in ten weeks to secure Prospect Cottage for the nation. The campaign enabled Art Fund to purchase the property from the Keith Collins Will Trust and to establish a permanent public programme, as well as funding conservation of the building, its contents and its garden. Prior to the appeal, the cottage had been at risk of private sale and dispersal. Artist Tacita Dean was instrumental in this campaign and served as a creative face for the campaign.

=== Film and stage responses ===
Jarman's life and work have been the subject of several documentary and artistic responses. The Last Paintings of Derek Jarman (1995), directed by Mark Jordan for Granada Television, documented the making of his final works and coincided with the exhibition Evil Queen at the Whitworth Art Gallery in Manchester.

Director Andy Kimpton-Nye made two films addressing Jarman's work: Derek Jarman: Life as Art (2004), a documentary featuring interviews with collaborators including Tilda Swinton and Simon Fisher Turner, and The Gospel According to St Derek (2014), which examined his filmmaking practice and cultural legacy.

In 2008 artist filmmaker Isaac Julien released Derek, a biographical film created in collaboration with Tilda Swinton. The film draws extensively on archival footage and incorporates material from a day-long interview Jarman gave to Colin McCabe.

Other screen works include Red Duckies (2006), directed by Luke Seomore and Joseph Bull and commissioned by Dazed & Confused for World AIDS Day, and Delphinium: A Childhood Portrait of Derek Jarman (2009), directed by Matthew Mishory, which combines narrative and documentary elements in portraying Jarman's early life. Delphinium screened at international film festivals and is held in the BFI National Archive.

Saintmaking: Derek Jarman and the Sisters of Perpetual Indulgence (2021): a documentary by Marco Alessi, was commissioned by The Guardian to commemorate the 30th anniversary of Jarman's canonisation into the first British living gay saint by the group of queer activist nuns, the Sisters of Perpetual Indulgence.

Jarman's final film Blue has also been reinterpreted for the stage. Blue Now (2023), directed by Neil Bartlett with music by Simon Fisher Turner, presented a live performance adaptation that toured venues in the United Kingdom.

In the 2026 Elsinore, a biographical drama film about the last months of British actor Ian Charleson's life, Jarman, played by David Dawson, was depicted as a friend of Charleson's after Jarman gave Charleson his first film role, in Jubilee.

=== Musical tributes ===
After his death, the band Chumbawamba released "Song for Derek Jarman" in his honour. Andi Sexgang released the CD Last of England as a Jarman tribute. The ambient experimental album The Garden Is Full of Metal by Robin Rimbaud included Jarman speech samples.

Manic Street Preachers' bassist Nicky Wire recorded a track titled "Derek Jarman's Garden" as a b-side to his single "Break My Heart Slowly" (2006). On his album In the Mist, released in 2011, ambient composer Harold Budd features a song titled "The Art of Mirrors (after Derek Jarman)".

Coil, which in 1985 contributed a soundtrack for Jarman's The Angelic Conversation released the 7" single "Themes for Derek Jarman's Blue" in 1993. In 2004, Coil's Peter Christopherson performed his score for the Jarman short The Art of Mirrors as a tribute to Jarman live at L'étrange Festival in Paris. In 2015, record label Black Mass Rising released a recording of the performance. In 2018, composer Gregory Spears created a work for chorus and string quartet, titled "The Tower and the Garden", commissioned by conductors Donald Nally, Mark Shapiro, Robert Geary and Carmen-Helena Téllez, setting a poem by Keith Garebian from his collection Blue: The Derek Jarman Poems (2008).

The French musician and composer Romain Frequency released his first album Research on a nameless colour in 2020 as a tribute to Jarman's final collection of Essays "Chroma" released in 1994, the year he died and written while struggling with illness (facing the irony of an artist going blind). The songs are devoted to an unexisting colour and their attendant emotion as a transposition of a certain contemplative state into sound. The album received a positive response from the press.

== Filmography ==
=== Feature films ===
Year	Title	Notes
1976	Sebastiane	
1978	Jubilee	
1979	The Tempest	
1985	The Angelic Conversation	
1986	Caravaggio	Awarded Silver Bear at Berlin International Film Festival
1987	The Last of England	
1989	War Requiem	
1990	The Garden	
1991	Edward II	
1993	Wittgenstein	
1993	Blue	

=== Short films ===
Year	Title	Notes	Ref.
1971	Studio Bankside		
1971	Electric Fairy		
1971	A Journey to Avebury		
1972	Garden of Luxor		
1972	Burning the Pyramids		
1972	Miss Gaby		
1972	Andrew Logan Kisses the Glitterati		
1972	At Low Tide		
1972	Tarot (aka the Magician)		
1973	Art of Mirrors		
1973	Sulphur		
1973	Stolen Apples for Karen Blixen		
1973	Ashden's Walk on Møn		
1973	Miss World		
1974	The Devils at the Elgin (aka Reworking the Devils)		
1974	Fire Island		
1974	Duggie Fields		
1974	In the Shadow of the Sun	Throbbing Gristle was commissioned to provide a new soundtrack for this 54-minute film in 1981	
1975	Ulla's Fete (aka Ulla's Chandelier)		
1975	Picnic at Ray's		
1975	Sebastiane Wrap		
1975	The Making of Sebastiane		
1976	Sea of Storms		
1976	Sloane Square	Blown up to 16mm in 1981 & retitled Sloane Square, A Room of One’s Own	
1976	Gerald's Film		
1976	Art and the Pose		
1976	Houston Texas		
1977	Jordan's Dance	Sections of this film appear in Jubilee	
1977	Every Woman for Herself and All for Art		
1978	The Pantheon		
1981	T.G.: Psychic Rally in Heaven		
1981	Jordan's Wedding		
1982	Waiting for Waiting for Godot		
1982	Pontormo and Punks at Santa Croce		
1983	B2 Tape		
1983	The Dream Machine	Consists of multiple short vignettes of previous works: Witches Song (1979); Broken English (1979); Ballad Of Lucy Jordan (1979); Pirate Tape (1983); T.G.: Psychic Rally In Heaven (1981).	
1984	Imagining October		
1987	Pirate Tape	William S. Burroughs film	
1987	Aria	Segment: Depuis le Jour	
1988	L'Ispirazione		
1993	Coil: Egyptian Basses		
1994	Glitterbug	One-hour compilation film of various Super-8 shorts with music by Brian Eno	
2014	Will You Dance With Me?	Filmed in 1984 but released posthumously	

=== Music videos ===
Year	Song	Band	Notes	Ref.
1977	The Sex Pistols Number One	The Sex Pistols		
1979	"Broken English", "Witches' Song", and "The Ballad of Lucy Jordan"	Marianne Faithfull		
1981	"TG Psychic Rally in Heaven"	Throbbing Gristle		
1983	"Dance With Me"	The Lords of the New Church		
1983	"Willow Weep for Me"	Carmel		
1983	"Dance Hall Days" (first version)	Wang Chung		
1984	"Catalan"	Psychic TV: Jordi Valls		
1984	"Touch The Radio Dance"	Language	Shown at the Museum of Modern Art, New York City	
1984	Billy Hyena	Wide Boy Awake		
1984	"What Presence?!"	Orange Juice		
1984	"Tenderness Is a Weakness"	Marc Almond		
1985	"Windswept"	Bryan Ferry		
1986	The Queen Is Dead	The Smiths	A short film incorporating the Smiths songs "The Queen Is Dead", "Panic", and "There Is a Light That Never Goes Out" The "Panic" sequence from The Queen Is Dead was edited to form the video for that single	
1986	"Ask"	The Smiths		
1986	"1969" and "Whistling in the Dark"	Easterhouse		
1986	"Avatar"	Matt Fretton		
1987	"Out of Hand"	The Mighty Lemon Drops		
1987	"I Cry Too" and "In The Pouring Rain"	Bob Geldof		
1987	"It's a Sin"	Pet Shop Boys		
1987	"Rent"	Pet Shop Boys		
1993	Projections	Pet Shop Boys	Several concert projections (released as Projections)	
1995	"Violence"	Pet Shop Boys		
1993	"The Next Life"	Suede		
1993	"Memorial Tribute"	Patti Smith		

=== As actor ===
- Ostia (as Pier Paolo Pasolini, 1987, dir. Julian Cole)
- Prick Up Your Ears (as Patrick Procktor, uncredited, 1987, dir. Stephen Frears)
- Dead Cat (as Medicine Man, 1989, dir. David Lewis)
- The Clearing (1994, dir. Alexis Bisticas)

== Scenic design ==
=== Ballet ===
- Jazz Calendar (Royal Opera House, London, 1968, choreo. Frederick Ashton)
- Throughway (Jeannetta Cochrane Theatre, London, 1968, choreo. Stere Popescu)
- Silver Apples of the Moon (New Theatre, Oxford, 1973, choreo. Tim Spain)
- One (London Contemporary Dance Theatre on tour, 1980, choreo. Tom Jobe)

=== Film ===
- The Devils (1971, dir. Ken Russell)
- Savage Messiah (1972, dir. Ken Russell)

=== Opera ===
- Don Giovanni (Coliseum, London, 1968, dir. John Gielgud)
- The Rake's Progress (Teatro della Pergola, Florence, 1982, dir. Ken Russell)

=== Theatre ===
- Poet of the Anemones (Royal Court Theatre Upstairs, London, 1969, dir. Nicholas Wright)
- The Secret of the Universe (ICA, London, 1980, dir. Ian Kellgren) [with Steven Meaha]
- Waiting for Godot (Queens Theatre, London, 1991, dir. Les Blair)
- The Maids (Edinburgh Festival, 1992 & Heaven, London, 1993, dir. Christopher Payton)

== Bibliography ==
=== Nonfiction ===
- Dancing Ledge (1984)
- The Last of England (1987; reissued 1996 as Kicking the Pricks)
- Modern Nature: Journals, 1989–1990 (1991)
- At Your Own Risk: A Saint's Testament (1992)
- Chroma: A Book of Colour – June '93 (1994)
- Derek Jarman's Garden (1995)
- Smiling in Slow Motion: Journals, 1991–1994 (2000)
- Derek Jarman's Sketchbooks (2013)

=== Screenplays ===
- Derek Jarman's Caravaggio (1986)
- War Requiem (1989)
- Queer Edward II (1991)
- Wittgenstein: The Terry Eagleton Script (1993)
- Blue: Text of a Film by Derek Jarman (1993)
- Up in the Air: Collected Film Scripts (1995)
- The Assassination of Pier Paolo Pasolini in the Garden of Earthly Delights (2025; written 1984)

=== Poetry ===
- A Finger in the Fishes Mouth (1972; reissued 2014, 2024)

=== Fiction ===
- Through The Billboard Promised Land Without Ever Stopping (2022; written 1971)

== See also ==
- LGBT culture in London
