= List of child music prodigies =

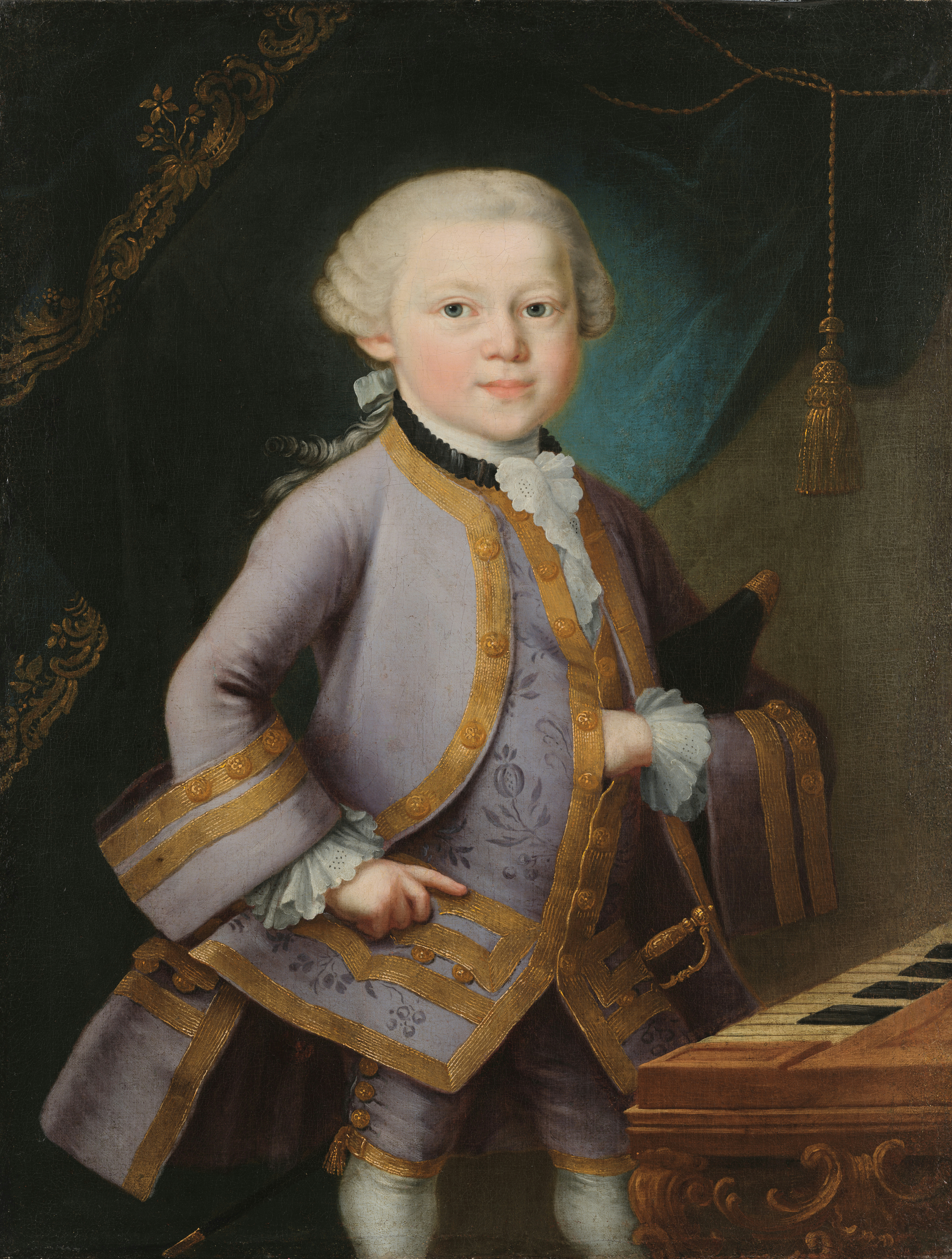
Wolfgang Amadeus Mozart in 1763, aged seven

A child prodigy is defined in psychology research literature as a person under the age of ten who produces meaningful output in some domain to the level of an adult expert performer. This is a list of young children (under around age 10) who displayed a talent in music deemed to make them competitive with skilled adult musicians. The list is sorted by instrument.

== Classical ==
=== Piano ===
| Name | Born | Instrument | Debut (Note: The age at which the musician had their first public performance.) | Notes |
|---|---|---|---|---|
| Charles-Valentin Alkan | 1813 | Piano | 5 | Entered Paris Conservatoire at age 5, youngest ever admission. |
| Martha Argerich | 1941 | Piano | 4 | Orchestral debut at age eight |
| Pepito Arriola | 1896 | Piano | 3 | Performed the Beethoven C Minor Concerto at the Royal Albert Hall aged 9 with the LSO and Frederic Hymen Cowen. |
| Kit Armstrong | 1992 | Piano | 5 | Concerto debut at eight; Morton Gould Young Composer Award for five consecutive years |
| Claudio Arrau | 1903 | Piano | 5 | Could read notes before letters |
| Daniel Barenboim | 1942 | Piano | 7 | |
| Emily Bear | 2001 | Piano | 5 | Composed and released her first piano album at age five |
| Vincenzo Bellini | 1801 | Piano | 5 | Began studying music theory at two, the piano at three, and by the age of five could apparently play well |
| Ethan Bortnick | 2000 | Composer, pianist | 5 | Ethan began playing a keyboard at the age of three and was composing music by the age of five. |
| Lili Boulanger | 1893 | Piano, violin, cello, harp | 6 | Attended Louis Vierne's organ classes at the Paris Conservatoire at age six |
| Kevin Chen | 2005 | Piano | 8 | Orchestral debut at age 8. Youngest student on record to have ever complete the Royal Conservatory exams. |
| Frédéric Chopin | 1810 | Piano | 7 | Wrote his first composition, a polonaise, which is still studied and performed today. |
| Augusta Cottlow | 1878 | Piano | 6 | Aged 10 performed a recital which included Haydn C major fantasie; Beethoven G major rondo, op.15; Beethoven G major sonata, op.14, No.2; Chopin E flat nocturne, op.9, No.2; Chopin A minor waltz, op.34, No.2, and Les Charmes de Paris by Moscheles. |
| William Crotch | 1775 | Organ, fortepiano | 3 | At age 3 he played the organ of the Chapel Royal in St James's Palace. |
| Solomon Cutner | 1902 | Piano | 8 | Performed at Queen's Hall London, June 1911, when he played Mozart's Concerto No.15 in B flat, K.450, as well as the central movement of the Tchaikovsky first concerto, and finally the Polacca by Alice Verne-Bredt. |
| Georges Cziffra | 1921 | Piano | 9 | Entered the Franz Liszt Academy at age nine, after some four years performing in a traveling circus |
| Carl Filtsch | 1830 | Piano | 6 | Composed concerto at thirteen; died at age fourteen |
| Nelson Freire | 1944 | Piano | 5 | He made his first public appearance at the age of five playing Mozart's Sonata K. 331. |
| Charly García | 1951 | Piano | 5 | Gave his first public recital at age five, became a music professor at age twelve. |
| Gary Graffman | 1928 | Piano | 7 | Entered the Curtis Institute of Music at the age of 7. |
| Elsie Hall | 1877 | Piano | 6 | Prize winner, New South Wales 1883. "The Antipodean Phenomenon", Europe 1880s. |
| Clara Haskil | 1895 | Piano | 5 | Gave her first concert in Vienna in 1902. |
| Otto Hegner | 1876 | Piano | 8 | Caused a sensation in London in 1888. |
| Cory Henry | 1987 | Piano, organ | 6 | Began playing both the piano and the B3 organ at two years old; played a recital at the Apollo Theater when he was six. |
| Josef Hofmann | 1876 | Piano | 10 | |
| Ernest Hutcheson | 1871 | Piano, composer | 5 | Gave his first public recitals aged five; entered the Leipzig Conservatory at the age of fourteen. |
| Maryla Jonas | 1911 | Piano | 9 | Made her debut with the Warsaw Philharmonic in 1920. |
| Evgeny Kissin | 1971 | Piano | 10 | Entered music school at age six |
| Raoul Koczalski | 1884 | Piano | 4 | Debut in St. Petersburg; noted Chopin exponent. |
| Lang Lang | 1982 | Piano | 5 | Began playing piano at age 3. Won the Xinghai National Piano Competition, International Competition for Young Pianists, International Tchaikovsky Competition for Young Musicians, and played for General Secretary of the Chinese Communist Party Jiang Zemin. Later accepted to the Curtis Institute at age 14. |
| Alicia de Larrocha | 1923 | Piano | 5 | She gave her first public performance at the age of five at the International Exposition in Barcelona. |
| Franz Liszt | 1811 | Piano | 9 | Performed first major concert at age eleven |
| Michele Levin | 1945 | Piano, composer | | Accepted into the Curtis Institute at the age of 10, where she made her debut with the Philadelphia Orchestra. |
| Maria Anna Mozart | 1751 | Harpsichord, fortepiano | 7 | Performed all over Europe with her father Leopold and brother Wolfgang Amadeus Mozart. Her career was thwarted by the gender roles of her time, and her domineering father demanded she marry. |
| Wolfgang Amadeus Mozart | 1756 | Piano, violin, composition | 4 | One of the most prolific composers of the Classical Era. Performed all over Europe with his father Leopold and sister Nannerl |
| Elisey Mysin | 2010 | Piano | 8 | At the age of eight, without a score, he performed Mozart's Concerto No. 3 in D major in Naberezhnye Chelny, Russia |
| Arthur Napoleon | 1844 | Piano | 4 | At the age of four, appeared at the Philharmonic Society of Oporto. Appeared in Paris in 1853, where Hector Berlioz noted his success in the Journal des Débats. |
| Pillar Osorio | 1905 | Piano | 3 | Performed, aged 3, in Leipzig. Step-sister to Pepito Arriola. |
| Daniel Pollack | 1935 | Piano | 9 | Made his debut with the New York Philharmonic at the age of nine, performing the Chopin Piano Concerto No. 1. |
| Iris de Cairos Rego | 1894 | Composer, pianist | 3 | Starting composing and playing aged 3. |
| Sugar Chile Robinson | 1938 | Jazz | 7 | At age 7, Sugar Chile played to large audiences along stars such as Lionel Hampton. |
| Camille Saint-Saëns | 1835 | Piano | 5 | Gave his first public recital at age five |
| Ernest Schelling | 1876 | Piano, composer | 4 | Debut at the Academy of Music in Philadelphia, Pennsylvania. |
| Ruth Slenczynska | 1925 | Piano | 6 | She played her debut in Berlin at age six and made her debut in Paris with a full orchestra at seven years of age. |
| Bruno Steindel | 1890 | Piano | 7 | London debut at Crystal Palace concerts, October 9, 1897 |
| Harriet Stubbs | 1988 | Piano | 4 | Began playing piano at age 3, performing publicly at 4. At age 5, she became the youngest student ever awarded a full scholarship to the prestigious Guildhall School of Music and Drama in London, completing Grade 8 with distinction by age 7. Harriet made her concerto debut at 9, performing her own cadenzas. By age 13, she was named one of three top instrumentalists on ITV's "Britain's Brilliant Prodigies" and performed in the feature film "Harry Potter and the Prisoner of Azkaban." |
| Vera Timanova | 1855 | Piano | 9 | At 11 began studying with Anton Rubinstein, and later with K. Tausig in Berlin. |
| Geoffrey Tozer | 1954 | Piano | 8 | Aged eight, Tozer performed Bach's Concerto No. 5 in F minor with the Victorian Symphony Orchestra, Australia |
| Yuja Wang | 1987 | Piano | 7 | Began learning piano at the age of 6, studying at the Curtis Institute from the age of 15. |

=== Strings ===
| Name | Born | Instrument | Debut | Notes |
|---|---|---|---|---|
| Sarah Chang | 1980 | violin | | Accepted to the Juilliard School at the age of 5, also studying privately with Issac Stern and Dorothy DeLay. Before she was 10, she had performed with the New York Philharmonic and the Philadelphia Orchestra. |
| Chloe Chua | 2007 | violin | | Won first prize in the Junior division of the 2018 Yehudi Menuhin International Competition for Young Violinists alongside Australian Christian Li. |
| Himari Yoshimura | 2011 | violin | | Described as a once-in-a-generation talent. In 21st century, only child prodigy (so far) to have performed with the Berliner Philharmoniker at age 13. |
| Mischa Elman | 1891 | violin | | |
| Ginette Neveu | 1919 | violin | | |
| Jean Gérardy | 1877 | cello | | |
| Ida Haendel | 1928 | violin | | |
| Jascha Heifetz | 1901 | violin | | |
| Bronisław Huberman | 1882 | violin | | |
| Dylana Jenson | 1961 | violin | | |
| Joseph Joachim | 1831 | violin | | |
| Clara-Jumi Kang | 1987 | violin | | |
| Christian Li | 2007 | violin | | Won first prize in the Junior division of the 2018 Yehudi Menuhin International Competition for Young Violinists alongside Singaporean Chloe Chua. |
| Yo-Yo Ma | 1955 | cello | 5 | Performed for presidents Dwight D. Eisenhower and John F. Kennedy at the age of 7, and was introduced by Leonard Bernstein on late night television. |
| Yehudi Menuhin | 1916 | violin | | |
| Midori | 1971 | violin | | |
| Niccolò Paganini | 1782 | violin | | |
| Thelma Reiss | 1906 | cello | | |
| Vadim Repin | 1971 | violin | | |
| Isabella Rudkin | c.1821/3 | harp | | |
| János Starker | 1924 | cello | | |
| Joseph Szigeti | 1892 | violin | | |
| Maxim Vengerov | 1974 | violin | | |
| Florizel von Reuter | 1890 | violin | | |

=== Composing ===
| Name | Born | Talent | Age of first composition | Notes |
|---|---|---|---|---|
| Kit Armstrong | 1992 | Piano | 5 | Composed seriously from the age of 6. First symphony at age 10. |
| Juan Crisóstomo Arriaga | 1806 | Composer | 9 | Wrote opera Los esclavos felices at age 14 and over 100 works before he died at age 19. Was praised as a student of Cherubini. |
| Samuel Barber | 1910 | Composer, conductor | 7 | Attempted an opera at age ten; attended the Curtis Institute of Music at age fourteen |
| Ferruccio Busoni | 1866 | Pianist, composer, conductor, editor, writer, and educator | 7 | Started composing prolifically at age 7. Composed his Concerto for Piano and String Quartet at age 11. |
| Frédéric Chopin | 1810 | Composer | 7 | Began concerts and polonaises at age seven; attained notability by age fifteen |
| Pio Cianchettini | 1799 | Composer, pianist | 6 | Composed prolifically for the piano, performing a concerto of own composition in London in 1809 when he was 10. Edited Beethoven’s works for British publishers. |
| Max Darewski | 1894 | Composer, pianist, conductor | 5 | Composed the waltz Le Rêve, aged 5. Conducted the massed bands numbering five thousand at Crystal Palace, aged 9. |
| Alma Deutscher | 2005 | Composer, pianist, violinist | 5 | Composed first piano sonata at age six, first violin concerto at age nine, and first full-length opera, Cinderella, at age ten. |
| George Enescu | 1881 | Composer | 5 | First compositions around age 5 and wrote large scale work, including four study symphonies in his youth. |
| Morton Gould | 1913 | Composer, conductor, pianist | 6 | |
| Jay Greenberg | 1991 | Composer | 6 | Entered the Juilliard school's pre-college at age 10; first symphony at age 11 |
| Evgeny Kissin | 1971 | Pianist, composer | 6 | Started composing significant output at age 7 including early work, Petrushka. |
| Erich Wolfgang Korngold | 1897 | Composer, conductor | 7 | Started composing at age 7. Wrote cantata and first ballet, ‘Der Schneemann’ at age 11. Piano sonata no.2 played by Artur Schnabel at 13; opera at 17. |
| Franz Liszt | 1811 | Composer, pianist, conductor, teacher | 9 | Was the only child composer to write for a set of Diabelli variations at age 11, and composed opera, Don Sanche, at age 13. |
| André Mathieu | 1929 | Composer, pianist | 4 | Wrote etudes and other works at age 4; piano concertino at age 7 performed with orchestra. |
| Felix Mendelssohn | 1809 | Composer, conductor | 11 | Composed 13 string symphonies from ages 12–14 and opera in his preteens. Also composed masterpieces like his A Midsummer Night’s Dream Overture and Octet in his later teens. |
| Gian Carlo Menotti | 1911 | Composer, librettist, playwright, director | 7 | Started composing at 7; composed first opera at age eleven |
| Wolfgang Amadeus Mozart | 1756 | Composer | 4 | Wrote 25 symphonies, 8-9 operas and various concerti, vocal, and solo work before adulthood. At age 4 (or 5,) his first compositions were Andante (K. 1a) and Allegro. (K. 1b) |
| Émile Naoumoff | 1962 | Pianist, composer | 6 | Began studying with Nadia Boulanger in Paris at the age of 8. His first piano concerto was conducted under Yehudi Menuhin with the composer at the piano when he was aged 10. |
| Dika Newlin | 1923 | Composer | 8 | At the age of 8, she wrote a symphonic piece, Cradle Song, that was added to the repertoire of Cincinnati orchestra conductor Vladimir Bakaleinikoff and performed three years later by the Cincinnati Symphony Orchestra. |
| Frederick Ouseley | 1825 | Composer, organist, musicologist and priest | 3 | Wrote first composition age the age of 3 years and 3 months, possibly the youngest to ever compose a cohesive musical work. Wrote 2 operas by age 8, including L'Isola disabitata. Composed nearly 300 pieces by age 16. |
| Alex Prior | 1992 | Composer, conductor | 8 | By his early teens had written symphonies, concertos, two ballets, two operas, and a requiem for the children of Beslan. |
| Sergei Prokofiev | 1891 | Composer, pianist, and conductor | 5 | Composed first piano piece at age 5. First operetta, The Giant, composed at age 9 along with several other short operas. |
| Sergei Rachmaninoff | 1873 | Composer, pianist | 11 | First pieces from age 11+ show remarkable craft; Piano Concerto No.1, composed from age 17-18. |
| Nino Rota | 1911 | Composer | 8 | First piano composition at age eight; attended Milan Conservatory at age 13; first oratorio performed publicly at age eleven and composed opera, Il Principe Porcaro, at age 13 |
| Camille Saint-Saëns | 1835 | Composer, organist, conductor, and pianist | 3 | Wrote first pieces at age 3. |
| Clara Schumann | 1819 | Pianist, composer, piano teacher | | Composed Four Polonaises at age 10, piano sonata at age 13, and premiered her Piano Concerto. |
| Julian Scriabin | 1908 | | | Composed 4 preludes in the style of his father before he died at the age of 11. |
| Richard Strauss | 1864 | Composer, conductor | 6 | Composed his first song Weihnachtslied aged 6. Composed Winterreise and other songs aged 7. His first orchestral composition, an overture to the singspiel Hochlands Treue was composed in 1872/73. |

=== Conducting ===
| Name | Born | Talent | Debut | Notes |
|---|---|---|---|---|
| Ferruccio Burco | 1939 | Conductor | 8 | Made his United States debut conducting a professional orchestra in Carnegie Hall. |
| Willy Ferrero | 1906 | Conductor, composer | 4 | First conducting appearance in Paris at the age of four, attended by Jules Massenet. At the age of seven, conducted an orchestra of 150 instruments at the Augusteum in Rome, an auditorium seating 5,000. |
| Lorin Maazel | 1930 | Conductor | 8 | Began conducting at age 7, studying under Vladimir Bakaleinikov and made debut at age 8. He conducted the National High School Orchestra at Interlochen Center for the Arts and subsequently the New York World's Fair. |
