= Mark Warman =

British composer

- Born: August 5, 1961 (age 64); Kingston upon Thames, England
- Genres: Musical theatre, film and TV scores
- Occupations: Conductor, musical director, composer, orchestrator, educator
- Instrument: Keyboards
- Years active: 1983–present
- Award: Hon ARAM (2012)

Mark Warman (born 5 August 1961) is a British conductor, musical director, composer, orchestrator, and educator. He has worked in London's West End on musical productions, orchestrated and conducted albums, and TV and film scores.

== Early life ==
Warman was born in Kingston upon Thames, and attended the Tiffin School. He studied music at King's College, Cambridge, where he sang in its Chapel Choir and eventually became the musical director of the Footlights Revue in 1983.

== Musical director ==
At the age of 23, Warman began his West End career as musical director of The Secret Diary of Adrian Mole Aged 13 3/4, which ran for 16 months at the Wyndham's Theatre. For EMI, he conducted an orchestral version of the score by Ken Howard and Alan Blaikley at Abbey Road Studios.

Warman served as the musical director, Conductor, or Arranger for over 100 shows in the West End and abroad.

== Work With Stephen Sondheim ==
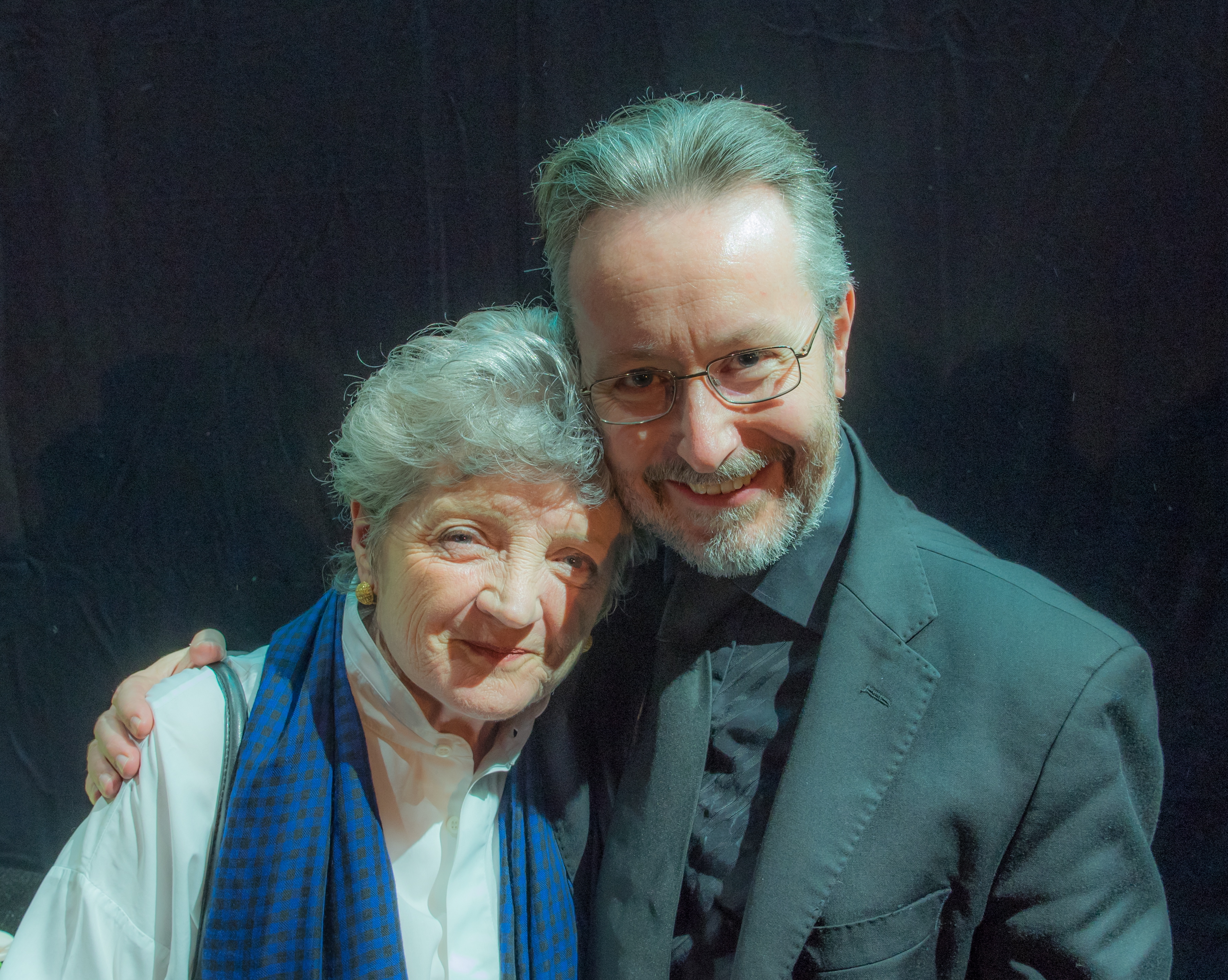
Mark Warman and Julia McKenzie together at the Stephen Sondheim Competition.

Over the course of his career, Warman has worked with Stephen Sondheim multiple times. In 1998, Warman was the musical director for the first UK production of Sondheim's Saturday Night at the Bridewell Theatre in London. He continued his work with Sondheim as the musical director for Evening Primrose as part of the 'Discover the Lost Musicals' series in London in 2005. His other collaborations with Sondheim include Into The Woods at the Donmar Warehouse in London, Sweeney Todd for Holland Park Opera Company in the UK and Pacific Overtures at the Donmar Warehouse, which went on to win the 2004 Olivier for Outstanding Musical Production. Sondheim is often a guest at the Royal Academy of Music, where Warman currently continues to lead as its Principal Tutor. In 2016, Warman was a judge for the Stephen Sondheim Society Student Prize of the Year competition, where he, Julia McKenzie, and a panel of judges selected the best up-and-coming musical theatre graduate of the year.

== Work With Carl Davis ==
Warman has also had a long working career with American conductor and musician Carl Davis. Together, they have orchestrated several scores for TV series and movies, including the 1995 series of Pride and Prejudice starring Colin Firth, the 1995 documentary film Anne Frank Remembered, starring Glenn Close and Kenneth Branagh, the series The Queen's Nose (1995–2000), the 1995 series Oliver's Travels, The Thatcher Years, and A Dance To The Music Of Time.

== Other film, TV and stage orchestrations ==
=== Film and TV ===
Warman has worked on many scores over his career. He has orchestrated and written for both film and television, mostly with the BBC. In 1986, he started working on the TV series of Mr Pye, followed shortly by A Penny For Your Dreams in 1987. Between 1987 and 1989, Warman worked on Foreign Bodies, another TV series on the BBC. In the 1990s, he worked on Mr. Abbott’s Broadway a BBC Omnibus production and the TV score of The Black And Blue Lamp.

Warman also worked on both the film scores of Vox Lux - a film by Brady Corbet, starring Natalie Portman and The Childhood Of A Leader - a film score with the music originally written by his long-time friend Scott Walker.

=== Stage orchestrations ===
Warman has also orchestrated many West End musicals over his career. Some of these include Nine and Into the Woods at the Donmar Warehouse, Moll Flanders at the Lyric Theatre, Hammersmith, Hard Times at the Theatre Royal in Haymarket, Metropolis at the Piccadilly Theatre, London and The Secret Diary of Adrian Mole at the Wyndham's Theatre in London.

He has also composed and orchestrated many incidental music scores for the theatre, including School For Scandal; Henry VIII and The Rivals for the Chichester Festival Theatre; and Three Hours After Marriage for the Royal Shakespeare Company. In 2019, he composed the score for Alan Ayckbourn's play The Boy Who Fell Into a Book (Stephen Joseph Theatre).

== Lost Musicals (1990 - 2013) ==
Ian Marshall Fisher, artistic director of Lost Musicals, invited Warman to be musical director for his inaugural 1990 season of three musicals: Fanny, Allegro and Trouble in Tahiti. Warman went on to musically direct a further 15 shows in this project: Greenwillow (1991), DuBarry Was a Lady (1993), Music in the Air (1993), Red, Hot and Blue (1994), Love Life (1995), Of Thee I Sing (1996), Gentlemen Prefer Blondes (1997), As Thousands Cheer (1998), I'd Rather Be Right (1999), Evening Primrose (2005), Nymph Errant (2006), Park Avenue (2008), Darling of the Day (2010), Flahooley (2012) and Around The World (2013), which was presented in London and New York. In 2001, a revival of DuBarry Was a Lady, with Warman conducting the BBC Concert Orchestra, was broadcast on BBC Radio 3.

== Scott Walker ==
Warman began working with the avant-garde musician Scott Walker on his album, The Drift in 2003. He remained as Walker's musical director, conductor, keyboardist, and orchestrator of albums, ballets and film scores until Walker's death in 2019. Brady Corbet's debut film The Childhood Of A Leader was chosen to close the 2017 International Film Festival Rotterdam with a live performance of Walker's score, performed by a 75-piece orchestra conducted by Warman.

== Royal Academy of Music ==
In 2003, Warman was invited by Mary Hammond, then Head of Musical Theatre at the Royal Academy of Music, to create a one-year postgraduate course in Musical Direction which he continues to lead as its Principal Tutor. He was awarded an Hon ARAM in 2012.

== Discography ==
- The Secret Diary of Adrian Mole - 1984 Original London Cast - Orchestrator, Conductor
- The Six Wives Of Henry VIII - 1988 Studio Cast
- Metropolis - 1989 Original London Cast - Music Director
- Children of Eden - 1993 Original London Cast - Keyboards
- A Year in Provence - 1993 Original Soundtrack - Keyboards, Arranger
- Moll Flanders - 1993 Original London Cast - Orchestrator, Producer
- Pride And Prejudice - 1995 Original Soundtrack - Orchestrator, Producer
- Circle Of Life - 1996 The Kings Singers - Orchestrator
- The Fields of Ambrosia - 1996 Original London Cast - Conductor
- Beauty And The Beast - 1997 Original London Cast - Keyboards
- Saturday Night - 1998 Original London Cast - Vocal Arrangements, Music Supervisor
- Hard Times - 2000 Original London Cast - Orchestrator, Producer
- DuBarry Was a Lady - 2001 Concert Cast - Music Director
- Here's To The Ladies - 2002 Christine Andreas - Conductor
- The Drift - 2006 Scott Walker - Orchestrator, Conductor
- Voices Of The Valley - 2006 Fron Male Voice Choir / Czech Film Orchestra - Conductor
- Charles Dickens' Hard Times -The Musical - 2008 Original London Cast - Recording Producer, Orchestrator
- And Who Shall Go To The Ball? - 2007 Scott Walker - Orchestrator, Conductor
- Chess In Concert - 2008 Concert Cast - Music Director
- From the Valleys: The Best of the Welsh Choirs - 2008 - Conductor
- Carl's War - 2010 Czech National Symphony Orchestra - Orchestrator
- Unburied Treasures: A Musical Revue - 2010 Original Cast - Producer
- Carl Davis: Heroines in Music - 2011 Carl Davis - Orchestrator
- Bish Bosch - 2012 Scott Walker - Orchestrator, Conductor
- Soused - 2014 Scott Walker - Orchestrator, Conductor
- The Childhood Of A Leader - 2016 Original Soundtrack - Orchestrator, Conductor
- Mary Poppins Returns - 2018 Original Soundtrack - Keyboards
- Vox Lux - 2018 Original Soundtrack - Orchestrator, Conductor
- Minus - 2018 Daniel Blumberg - Choir Director

== Personal life ==
Warman lives in London. He represents himself and still continues to record albums for shows, groups, and solo artists.
