= Alternative Hits =

Compilation album by Chelsea
- Released: September 1980
- Genre: Punk rock
- Label: Step-Forward, I.R.S.

Chelsea chronology
Chelsea (1979)	Alternative Hits (1980)	Evacuate (1982)

Professional ratings
Review scores
Source	Rating
AllMusic	4/5 stars

Alternative Hits is an album by British punk rock band Chelsea. Since all the album's tracks had been previously released as singles except "Come On". Alternative Hits is regarded as a compilation album. Songs include a version of the Seeds' "No Escape", and "Urban Kids", which was co-written by Chelsea frontman Gene October and Alternative TV.

Alternative TV's "Urban Kids".

Originally released in 1980 by Step-Forward Records, and retitled as No Escape in the U.S. by I.R.S. Records, it was reissued in 2008 by Captain Oi!.

== Track listing ==
1. "No Escape" (Buck Reeder, Jimmy Lawrence, Sky Saxon) - 2:22
2. "Urban Kids" (Alex Fergusson, Dave Martin, Gene October, Mark Perry) - 2:56
3. "No Flowers" (Dave Martin, Gene October) - 2:49
4. "Right to Work" (Gene October) - 3:04
5. "Look at the Outside" (Chris Bashford, James Stevenson) - 3:26
6. "What Would You Do" (Dave Martin) - 1:56
7. "No One's Coming Outside" (Dave Martin) - 3:18
8. "The Loner" (Gene October) - 2:58
9. "Don't Get Me Wrong" (James Stevenson) - 2:37
10. "Decide" (Gene October) - 3:03
11. "Come On" (Chris Bashford, Dave Martin) - 2:16

Bonus tracks on 2008 reissue CD:

1. "High Rise Living" (Martin Stacey) - 3:55
2. "No Admission" (Gene October) - 3:01

== Personnel ==
Chelsea

- Gene October - vocals
- Dave Martin (tracks: 2 to 4, 6 to 8, 10 to 12), James Stevenson - guitar
- Brian James - lead guitar on "No Escape"
- Geoff Myles (tracks: 1 to 4, 6 to 12), Henry Daze (tracks: 5, 9, 13, 14) - bass
- Carey Fortune (tracks: 5, 9, 13, 14), Chris Bashford (tracks: 1, 4, 6 to 8, 10 to 12), Steve J. Jones (tracks: 2, 3) - drums
