= Chelsea (album) =

Studio album by Chelsea
- Released: 29 June 1979
- Studio: Surrey Sound Studios, Leatherhead, Surrey; Sound Suite, Camden, London
- Genre: Punk rock
- Label: Step-Forward
- Producer: Chelsea, Wally Brill

Chelsea chronology
Chelsea (1979)	Alternative Hits (1980)

Professional ratings
Review scores
Source	Rating
AllMusic	3/5 stars

Chelsea is the self-titled debut album by British punk rock band Chelsea. It was recorded during two weeks in early January 1979 and released by Step-Forward Records on 29 June 1979.
In 2008, it was reissued by Captain Oi! with several bonus tracks not included on the original release.

== Track listing ==
1. "I'm on Fire" (Geoff Myles) - 3:43
2. "Decide" (Gene October) - 3:02
3. "Free the Fighters" (Dave Martin) - 3:08
4. "Your Toy" (James Stevenson) - 2:56
5. "Fools and Soldiers" (Martin) - 3:23
6. "All the Downs" (Martin) - 2:34
7. "Government" (October) - 5:30
8. "Twelve Men" (Martin, Stevenson) - 2:42
9. "Many Rivers" (Jimmy Cliff) - 4:33
10. "Trouble Is the Day" (Martin) - 3:54

Bonus tracks included on reissue CD:

1. "Urban Kids" (Demo) - 2:38
2. "No Escape" (Sky Saxon) (Demo) - 2:32
3. "Twelve Men" (Demo) - 2:40
4. "All the Downs" (Demo) - 2:39

== Personnel ==
Chelsea

- Gene October — lead vocals
- James Stevenson — lead guitar, backing vocals
- Dave Martin — rhythm guitar, backing vocals
- Geoff Myles — bass
- Chris Bashford — drums, backing vocals

with:

- Robin — keyboards

Technical

- Alvin Clark, Martin Moss, Nick Smith, Nigel Gray, Pete Hammond — engineer
- Tony MacLean — cover photography
