= Gene Loves Jezebel =

British rock band

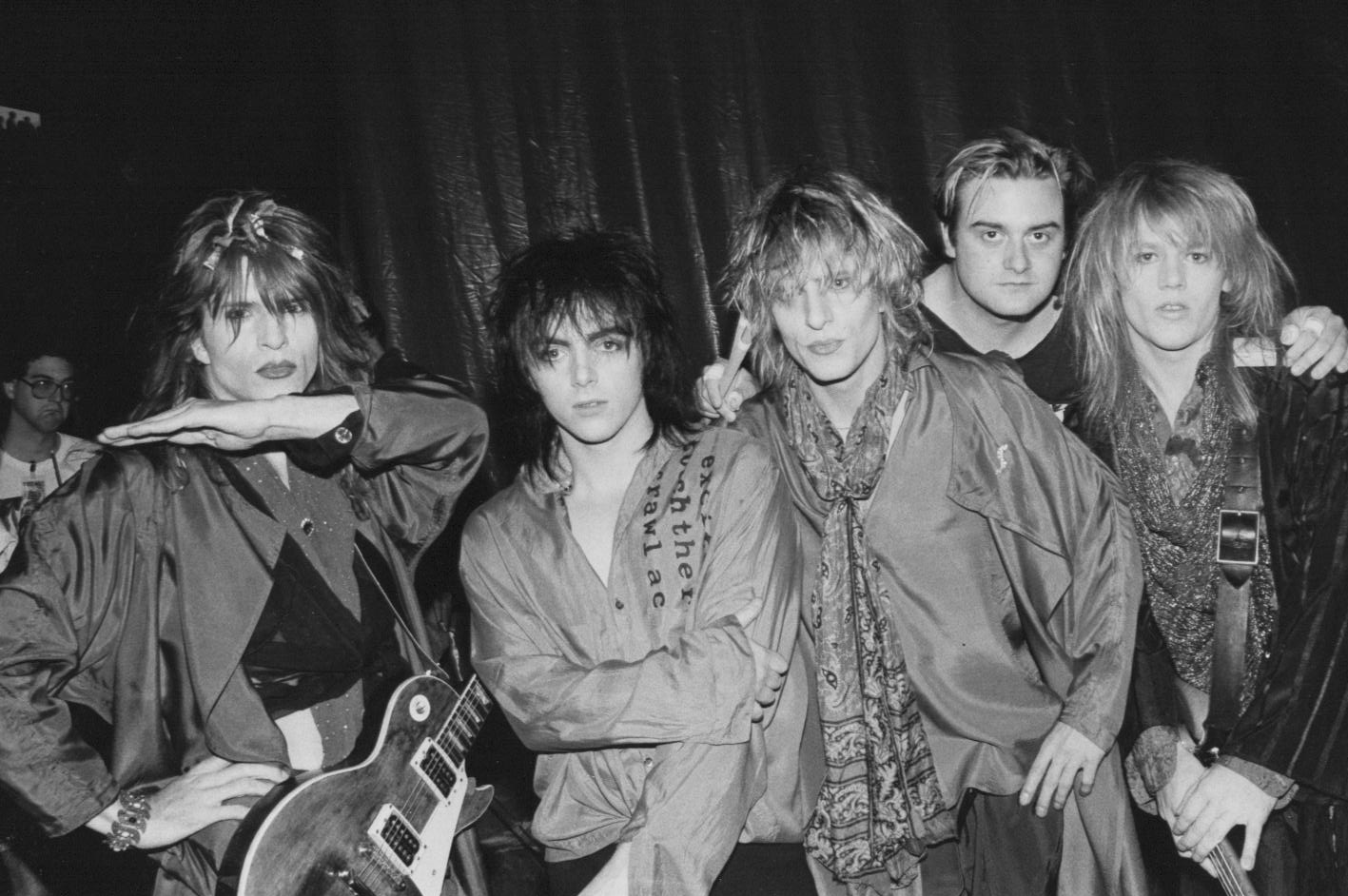
- Gene Loves Jezebel (1988)

Background information
- Origin: London, England
- Genres: Gothic rock; post-punk; new wave; alternative rock; hard rock; glam metal
- Years active: 1980–present
- Label: Blessmomma Records/Track. Plastichead/Westworld Recordings
- Members: Jay Aston's Gene Loves Jezebel; Jay Aston; James Stevenson; Peter Rizzo; Robert Adam; Chris Bell; Michael Aston's Gene Loves Jezebel; Michael Aston; Michael Ciravolo; Pando Switch; Stephen Jude Mills
- Past members: James Chater; Steve Radmall; Richard Hawkins; John Murphy; Joel Patterson; Francois Perez; Ian Hudson; Julianne Regan; Albi DeLuca; Jean-Marc Lederman; Stephen Marshall; Dirk Doucette; Marcus Gilvear; Chad MacDonald; Nick Rozz; Troy Patrick Farrell

Gene Loves Jezebel are a British rock band formed in the early 1980s by twin brothers Michael Aston and Jay Aston. Initially associated with gothic rock and post-punk, their 1983 debut album Promise reached no.8 on the UK Indie Chart. The band's popularity peaked a few years later with their 1986 album Discover reaching the top 40 on the UK Albums Chart and five singles entering the UK Singles Chart in 1986-1987, including "Heartache", "Desire (Come and Get It)" and "The Motion of Love", and also gaining success in the US. The Aston brothers later parted ways and formed two different band versions of Gene Loves Jezebel.

== Early years: 1980–1989 ==
Originally named Slavaryan by Michael, Gene Loves Jezebel was formed in 1981 by the Aston brothers, with drummer James Chater, bassist Steve Radwell, and guitarist Ian Hudson. However, essentially Gene (Michael Aston) and Jezebel (Jay Aston) were a duo with frequently changing back up players. Other early members included bassist Stephen Marshall, drummers Richard Hawkins and John Murphy, bassist Stephen Davis, and drummer Steve Snowy Evans.

The Astons grew up in Cornelly, and Michael later in Porthcawl, in Wales, and moved to London in 1981. With a new home, and shortly afterwards, the new name, the trio with bassist Julianne Regan and drummer James Chater (later replaced by John Murphy (the Associates) and then Richard Hawkins) played several live shows and were signed by Situation Two.

Gene Loves Jezebel underwent numerous lineup changes between 1981 and 1985. In May 1982, Situation Two released Gene Loves Jezebel's demo and single, "Shaving My Neck". Regan exited within a year to form All About Eve. This left Ian Hudson briefly playing bass and Albie DeLuca as the guitar player until Stephen Marshall joined. "Desire", was the bands most successful single, with Michael producing and writing the crucial chorus and come and get it refrains.

In 1983, Albi Deluca moved to guitar and Ian Hudson to bass, the band released two more singles, "Screaming (For Emmalene)" and "Bruises", and then their first album, Promise, which peaked at number 8 in the UK Indie Chart. In 1984, the group recorded a John Peel radio session for the BBC and toured the UK with fellow Welsh artist John Cale. and recorded in New York with Cale. The second Album, Stephen Marshall was hired as bass guitar and John Murphy played drums with Richard Hawkins appearing on a few tunes too.

The band's second album, Immigrant, was released in mid-1985. However, at the start of a long American tour for Immigrant, founding member Ian Hudson had a nervous breakdown and was replaced by former Chelsea and Generation X guitarist James Stevenson (who later also played rhythm guitar on tour with the Cult).

During 1986, the group moved to Situation Two's parent company, Beggar's Banquet Records, and distribution rights in the U.S. were given to Geffen Records. The subsequent promotion increased pop-chart success for the group. The single "Sweetest Thing" briefly hit the top 75 in the U.K., and the album Discover reached number 32 in the UK Albums Chart. At this time, the group also found heavy rotation on college and counterculture radio stations across America. The band had slowly turned their attention to dance music. The singles "Desire" and "Heartache" reached #6 and #72, respectively, on Los Angeles' new wave station, KROQ-FM. Later that year, former Spear of Destiny and Thompson Twins member Chris Bell became the band's fifth drummer.

Gene Loves Jezebel's fourth album, The House of Dolls, was released in 1987 and yielded the singles "20 Killer Hurts" and "The Motion of Love". "The Motion of Love", was the band's first appearance on the US Billboard Hot 100. It was also a top 50 hit in the UK.

== Split and brief reunion: 1990–1997 ==
Fighting between brothers Jay and Michael Aston led to the band breaking up. While Michael Aston went solo, the rest of the band continued as Gene Loves Jezebel. Gene Loves Jezebel recorded two albums without Michael, Kiss of Life (1990) and Heavenly Bodies (1992). The band's label Savage Records went bust shortly after the release of Heavenly Bodies while the band were on tour in the USA forcing the band to briefly split. In 1993, the brothers reformed the band with a new lineup; Francois Perez replaced James Stevenson and drummer Robert Adam was retained. James Stevenson was asked to join The Cult on their world tour as rhythm guitarist.

While Jay Aston performed occasional acoustic shows under his own name, Michael Aston formed a new band called the Immigrants (renamed Edith Grove in 1994) and later released a primarily acoustic solo album, Why Me, Why This, Why Now. The brothers began working together again that same year and recorded two songs with Stevenson, Bell, and Rizzo for a compilation album, The Best Of, released in September 1995. Jay Aston also recorded a solo album, Unpopular Songs, produced by Stevenson.

The brothers reconciled in the mid-1990s, wrote some new songs together, and shared a house in Los Angeles. They initially used Michael Aston's band from the Why Me album era. In 1997, the band embarked on the Pre-Raphaelite Brothers tour, in which Gene Loves Jezebel material and songs from the brothers' solo careers would be performed.

== Two Genes Loving Jezebel: 1997–present ==
Michael Aston Performing live at whiskey a go go (05/15/2026)

After the Pre-Raphaelite Brothers tour, Jay Aston refused to work with his brother unless Stevenson and Rizzo were brought back. Michael Aston agreed, and the album VII was recorded in England. A reunion tour was undertaken in the U.S. during which a rift developed between the brothers. Michael Aston, who missed the final dates of the tour, launched his own band, also called Gene Loves Jezebel, with musicians from the Pre-Raphaelite tour. His vocals were removed from the VII album, which was released without any contribution from him. Later, the full album with Michael's vocals included was released as The Doghouse Sessions. In October 1997, Jay Aston, Rizzo, and Stevenson sued Michael Aston over rights to the name Gene Loves Jezebel and, after a protracted court battle, eventually dropped the lawsuit.

Michael Aston leads the US version of the band and has toured both the US and the UK, supporting releases such as Love Lies Bleeding (1999), Giving Up the Ghost (2001) and Exploding Girls (2003). Jay Aston leads the UK version of the band, also featuring James Stevenson and Pete Rizzo, and has toured both the US and the UK extensively as well to support releases such as Accept No Substitute (2002), The Thornfield Sessions (2003), The Anthology, Vols. 1-2 (2006) and Dance Underwater (2017) and Love Death Sorrow (2023)

On 15 February 2008, a lawsuit was filed by Michael Aston in California's Central District Court, against "Chris Bell, James Stevenson, Jay Aston, John Aston, Libertalia Entertainment and others" for trademark infringement. In a posting on their Myspace page on 25 September 2009, Jay Aston's Gene Loves Jezebel announced that an agreement had been reached with Michael Aston regarding the use of the name Gene Loves Jezebel: Jay Aston's band is now known as "Gene Loves Jezebel" in the UK and "Jay Aston's Gene Loves Jezebel" within the US; Michael Aston's band is now known as "Gene Loves Jezebel" in the US and "Michael Aston's Gene Loves Jezebel" in the UK. The settlement agreement was posted on Michael Aston's Gene Loves Jezebel website.

Jay Aston, along with Julianne Regan, contributed vocals on a cover of the Rolling Stones' "Moonlight Mile" that appeared on the 2010 album Small Distortions by the Belgian music project La Femme Verte (assembled by ex-Kid Montana member Jean-Marc Lederman).

In 2011, Michael Aston contributed vocals to a new version of "Desire", titled "Desire (Come and Get It)", by guitarist and producer Gabe Treiyer's electronic music project Electronic Fair, which became number one on the Electronic Dance Music (EDM) Chart in Argentina.

On 16 November 2011, Jay Aston and James Stevenson appeared on stage at the Brixton Academy in London with the Smashing Pumpkins to perform the song "Stephen" from the Immigrant album.

In December 2016, Jay Aston's Gene Loves Jezebel announced that they were recording a new album via a Pledge Music campaign. The album, entitled Dance Underwater, was completed in April 2017 and was released on 30 June 2017 via Westworld Recordings/Plastichead.

In September 2018, Jay Aston, James Stevenson, and Peter Rizzo were named as defendants in a lawsuit brought by Michael Aston for infringement of his trademark at the end of Jay Aston's Gene Loves Jezebel's first US tour in ten years. Jay Aston's band argued that they had complied with the agreement with Michael Aston to the best of their ability. At the hearing on 7 January 2019 in Santa Ana, California, before the judge The Hon James Selna, the judge found in favor of the defendants on all of the five counts that Michael Aston had brought and ordered him to pay the defendants' legal fees. Case 8:808-cv-00181-JVS (RNBX)

On 1 December 2023, Jay Aston's Gene Loves Jezebel released their tenth studio album, Love Death Sorrow, on Cleopatra Records to critical acclaim. In his review of Love Death Sorrow for Goldmine Magazine, Dave Thompson wrote “It not only sounds like a classic Jezzies(short for Gene Loves Jezebel) album, it feels like one as well — at the same time as dodging any accusation of treading water or restating old ground. The band have already lived through their glory days. Now they're celebrating their most glorious." Thomson also praised the guitar work of James Stevenson saying "Stevenson is playing some of the most grandiosely incisive guitar of his life right now." James Stevenson left the band in the summer of 2025.

== In popular culture ==
The 2017 album Goths by The Mountain Goats contains the song "Abandoned Flesh," which chronicles the history of Gene Loves Jezebel, including a reference to this Wikipedia page.

Their song 'Cow', features in 27 Dresses (2008).

== Discography ==
=== Albums ===
Year	Title	UK	UKI	US
1983	Promise	-	8	-
1985	Immigrant	-	-	-
1986	Discover	32	-	155
1987	The House of Dolls	81	-	108
1990	Kiss of Life²	-	-	123
1993	Heavenly Bodies²	-	-	-
1999	VII²	-	-	-
1999	Love Lies Bleeding¹	-	-	-
2001	Giving Up the Ghost¹	-	-	-
2003	Exploding Girls¹	-	-	-
2017	Dance Underwater²	-	-	-
2023	Love Death Sorrow²	-	-	-

=== Singles ===
Year	Title	UK	UKI	US	Alt
1982	"Shaving My Neck"	-	-	-	-
1983	"Screaming For Emmalene / So Young"	-	18	-	-
1983	"Bruises"	-	7	-	-
1984	"Influenza (relapse)"	-	11	-	-
1984	"Shame (Whole Heart Howl)"	-	14	-	-
1985	"The Cow"	-	9	-	-
1985	"Desire"	-	4	-	-
1986	"Sweetest Thing"	75	-	-	-
1986	"Heartache"	71	-	-	-
1986	"Desire (Come and Get It)"	95	-	-	-
1987	"The Motion of Love"	56	-	-	-
1987	"Gorgeous"	68	-	-	-
1988	"Every Door" (withdrawn)	-	-	-	-
1988	"The Motion of Love"	-	-	87	-
1990	"Jealous"²	-	-	68	1
1990	"Tangled Up in You"²	-	-	-	-
1993	"Josephina"²	-	-	-	18
1999	Survive This EP (promo only)¹	-	-	-	-
2017	"Summertime"²	-	-	-	-

¹ Michael Aston's Gene Loves Jezebel
² Jay Aston's Gene Loves Jezebel
