= My Face =

My Face may refer to:

- "My Face", a 1980 single by Henry Badowski
- "My Face", a 1980 single by John Foxx
- My Face, a 2001 album by Haddaway
