= Promise (Gene Loves Jezebel album) =

Studio album by Gene Loves Jezebel
- Released: 1983
- Recorded: 1982–1983
- Genre: Post-punk; gothic rock
- Length: 37:13
- Label: Situation Two (UK); Geffen (U.S.)
- Producer: John Brand

Gene Loves Jezebel chronology
Promise (1983)	Immigrant (1985)

Singles from Promise
- 1. "Screaming for Emmalene / So Young" Released: 1983; 2. "Bruises" Released: 1983; 3. "Influenza (Relapse)" Released: 1984

Professional ratings
Review scores
Source	Rating
AllMusic	3/5 stars
The Encyclopedia of Popular Music	3/5 stars

Promise is the debut album by British gothic rock band Gene Loves Jezebel. Released in 1983 by Situation Two, it peaked at No. 8 on the UK Indie Chart.

== Critical reception ==
Trouser Press wrote that "the songs have a decidedly sexual air, but it’s the sheer din — roughly produced but convincing — that makes Promise worth repeated listenings."

== Track listing ==
All tracks are written by John Aston and Michael Aston, except where noted

Side A
No.	Title	Writer(s)	Length
1.	"Upstairs"	J. Aston; M. Aston; Ian C. Hudson	3:18
2.	"Bruises"		3:38
3.	"Pop Tarantula"		3:10
4.	"Screaming for Emmalene"		2:58
5.	"Scheming"		6:26

Side B
No.	Title	Writer(s)	Length
1.	"Bread from Heaven"	J. Aston; M. Aston; Hudson	4:12
2.	"Influenza"	J. Aston; Hudson	3:42
3.	"Shower Me with Brittle Punches"	J. Aston; M. Aston; Hudson	2:50
4.	"Wraps and Arms"		4:00
5.	"Psychological Problems"	J. Aston; M. Aston; Hudson	3:45

Special Edition bonus disc
No.	Title	Writer(s)	Length
1.	"Shame" (Original Version)	J. Aston; M. Aston; Hudson	3:25
2.	"Influenza" (Relapse)	J. Aston; Hudson	3:48
3.	"Stephen" (Original Version)	Richard Hawkins; Steve Marshall	4:49
4.	"Walking in the Park"	J. Aston; M. Aston; Hudson	4:06
5.	"Wraps and Arms" (Version Two)		4:00
6.	"Bruises" (Extended Single Version)		4:49
7.	"Punch Drunk"		2:23
8.	"Brando (Bruises)" (Extended Version)		4:58
9.	"Scheming" (Original Version)		3:33
10.	"Screaming for Emmalene" (Single Version)		3:55
11.	"So Young (Heave Hard Heave Ho)"		3:24
12.	"No Voodoo Dollies"		3:02
13.	"Shaving My Neck"		2:55
14.	"Sun and Insanity"	J. Aston; M. Aston; Hudson	3:37
15.	"Machismo"		3:22
16.	"Glad to Be Alive"		5:38

== Personnel ==
- Jay Aston - lead vocals, backing vocals, guitars
- Michael Aston - lead vocals
- Ian C. Hudson - guitars, bass
- Albie DeLuca - guitars
- Julianne Regan - bass, backing vocals, piano
- Steve Marshall - bass

with:

- Steve Goulding - drums, percussion
- Richard Hawkins - drums, percussion
- John "Johnny Genius" Murphy - drums, percussion
- Graeme Pleeth - keyboards

Technical

- John Brand - producer, engineer
- Louis Austin - engineer, mixing
- John Madden, Nick Smith, Robin Springall - engineer
