= Dance Underwater =

Studio album by Gene Loves Jezebel
- Released: 30 June 2017
- Genre: Alternative rock
- Length: 40:55
- Label: Westworld
- Producer: Peter Walsh

Gene Loves Jezebel chronology
The Thornfield Sessions (2003)	Dance Underwater (2017)

Singles from Dance Underwater
- 1. "Summertime" Released: 2 June 2017

Dance Underwater is a 2017 studio album by the Welsh gothic rock band Jay Aston's Gene Loves Jezebel. It was released on 30 June 2017 on CD and digital download, and on 29 September it was available on vinyl. It is Jay Aston's first studio album under the Gene Loves Jezebel name since The Thornfield Sessions in 2003.

== Background ==
After the splitting of the original Gene Loves Jezebel, Jay Aston came close to walking away from music. His version of the band had only released the semi-acoustic The Thornfield Sessions in 2003, while his brother's, Michael, version had released three albums between 1999 and 2003.

In 2010, Aston received a call asking if he wanted to sing on a Rolling Stones tribute album – this sparked the musician's interest once again. Soon, Aston was performing solo shows and even released an album with bassist Pete Rizzo, but it would take until 2017 for the two to work on another Gene Loves Jezebel album. For Dance Underwater they enlisted Peter Walsh as producer, who also worked on Gene Loves Jezebel's House of Dolls and Heavenly Bodies albums, and one of their most popular songs, "Desire" from 1986.

The album was funded through PledgeMusic, and by the end of the fundraiser, they managed to reach over 25% of the original goal. On 27 April, the first single, "Summertime", was released, and two months later, on 30 June, the album was released on CD and digital formats; vinyl would come on 29 September.

== Reception ==
Professional ratings
Review scores
Source	Rating
New Noise	3/5 stars
The Rockpit	Favourable
Cryptic Rock	5/5 stars
Classic Rock	2.5/5 stars

Dance Underwater received mixed reviews. New Noise Magazine felt "Charmed Life (Never Give In)" was too autotuned, but found the rest of the album to have the same "mix of goth, rock, and pop" the band is known for from the 1980s. The reviewer felt there was no desire to reinvent the music.

Meanwhile, Mark Rockpit from The Rockpit found the album to be a "great return to form [by] evoking the moods and beats of thirty years ago." He found the songs to contain "velvety rhythms", "other-worldly vibes", and "beautiful honesty". Rockpit finished his review by stating that "I Don't Wanna Dance Underwater" is the best song on the best album he's heard all year. He applauded the band for continuing to make music with the same depth and richness as they did thirty years prior.

Alfie Vera Mella from Cryptic Rock also found the album worthy of high praise, giving it five stars for its "sentimental ballads" and "funky grooves", a contrast to Dom Lawson of Classic Rock who found it all to be too "polished and polite".

== Track listing ==
No.	Title	Length
1.	"Charmed Life (Never Give In)"	4:26
2.	"Summertime"	3:29
3.	"How Do You Say Goodbye (To Someone You Love)"	5:00
4.	"Izitme"	4:32
5.	"Ain't It Enough"	3:21
6.	"Cry 4 U"	3:16
7.	"Flying"	5:11
8.	"World Gone Crazy"	4:09
9.	"Chase the Sun"	2:58
10.	"I Don't Wanna Dance Underwater"	4:33
Total length:		40:55

== Personnel ==
Band members

- Jay Aston – lead vocals, guitar
- James Stevenson – guitar
- Peter Rizzo – bass guitar
- Chris Bell – drums

Production

- Peter Walsh – producer
