= The Tempest (1979 film) =

1979 British drama film

- Theatrical release poster
- Directed by: Derek Jarman
- Screenplay by: Derek Jarman
- Based on: The Tempest by William Shakespeare
- Produced by: Guy Ford; Mordecai Schreiber
- Starring: Heathcote Williams; Toyah Willcox; Karl Johnson; Peter Bull; Richard Warwick
- Cinematography: Peter Middleton
- Edited by: Lesley Walker
- Music by: Brian Hodgson; John Lewis; Stephen Pruslin
- Release date: 13 September 1979
- Running time: 92 minutes
- Country: United Kingdom
- Language: English
- Budget: $350,000

The Tempest is a 1979 film adaptation of William Shakespeare's play of the same name. Directed by Derek Jarman, produced by Don Boyd, with Heathcote Williams as Prospero, it also stars Toyah Willcox, Jack Birkett, Karl Johnson and Helen Wellington-Lloyd from Jarman's previous feature, Jubilee (1977).

== Plot ==
The magician Prospero tosses and turns in his sleep while a violent storm tosses a ship on the ocean. Prospero awakens with a start as lightning strikes the ship, and summons his servant, the spirit Ariel. Ariel tells Prospero the details of the storm, which was an illusion he created at Prospero's command to lead the King of Naples (Alonso) and his crew to the island and trap them there.

Prospero's daughter, Miranda, wakes up and joins her father in his study and they discuss their pasts. Caliban, Prospero's other servant, interrupts their conversation, and Prospero stomps on his fingers and threatens to punish him. Caliban explains that he is the rightful owner of the island, and that Prospero enslaved him after he taught Prospero how to survive on the island.

Miranda goes back to sleep, and Ariel announces that the ship is safely hidden. He tells Prospero that the King and his son, Ferdinand, have been separated by the wreck. Prospero instructs Ariel to bring Ferdinand into the house. Ariel goes to Ferdinand, who has emerged naked from the sea, and lures him towards the house with a song. Ferdinand enters the building and goes to sleep by the fireplace. Prospero, Ariel, and Miranda find him sleeping and Prospero promises Ariel his freedom in two days' time for bringing him to the house. Prospero accuses Ferdinand of being a spy, and Miranda vouches for his innocence. Prospero gives Ferdinand clothing and permission to sleep in Caliban's quarters, promising to put him to work after he has rested, and shackles his ankles.

Miranda asks Prospero about their past, and he reveals that he was once Duke of Milan, but turned his governing duties over to Antonio so that he could study magic. He explains that Antonio overthrew Prospero and, with an order from Alonso, Prospero and Miranda were exiled to the island. Prospero shows Miranda a vision of their past in the crystal of his sceptre, and reveals that the storm was created so that he could exact revenge upon Alonso and Antonio.

Meanwhile, Alonso and the other shipwreck survivors find and enter Prospero's house. Following the sound of music, they wander into an empty ballroom. They are attacked by imps who hiss and bite at them. Ariel appears and reminds them of how they wronged Prospero in the past, and they become frozen in stasis and covered in cobwebs.

Prospero sees Miranda and Ferdinand share a kiss, as the two have decided to marry, and announces that Ferdinand's forced labour was a trial to prove himself worthy of marrying Miranda. Prospero permits their union and frees Ferdinand from servitude.

Prospero and Ariel use their magic to create an elaborate masque around the frozen Alonso and the others. Sailors dance around the room frantically, and Miranda and Ferdinand appear in wedding attire. Prospero awakens Alonso and the others from stasis, reuniting Ferdinand with his father, and forgives the others for their past betrayals. The Goddess appears and sings a rendition of "Stormy Weather" while everyone looks on.

The film ends with Prospero and Ariel alone in the study. Ariel sings Prospero to sleep, and then runs away. Prospero directly addresses the viewer through voice over narration, announcing that "these revels now have ended", and the credits roll.

== Cast ==
- Peter Bull as Alonso (King of Naples)
- David Meyer as Ferdinand
- Neil Cunningham as Sebastian
- Heathcote Williams as Prospero
- Kate Temple as young Miranda
- Toyah Willcox as Miranda
- Richard Warwick as Antonio
- Karl Johnson as Ariel
- Jack Birkett as Caliban
- Christopher Biggins as Stephano
- Peter Turner as Trinculo
- Ken Campbell as Gonzalo
- Elisabeth Welch as A Goddess

The film features cameos by Claire Davenport as Sycorax, Kate Temple as Young Miranda, and Helen Wellington-Lloyd and Angela Wittingham as The Spirits.

== Production ==
=== Development ===
Jarman had been working on adapting The Tempest for several years before filming began, working on an adaptation for the stage before settling on a film adaptation. He was attracted to Shakespeare's original play due to the themes of forgiveness he saw throughout the text. He was concerned with creating a film that struck a balance between aspects of theater and aspects of film, and reworked the text so that his version would not be a straightforward adaptation of the play. Jarman stated in his production notes that "I hope to capture something of the mystery and atmosphere of the original without descending to theatrics. There are films where magic works."

The movie was part of a slate of films worth £3 million in all produced by Don Boyd.

=== Style ===
The film was shot inside Stoneleigh Abbey, Warwickshire. Jarman chose the location due to budget constraints, as the abbey created the atmosphere he wanted without needing access to an expansive or exotic set.

The costuming draws on the styles of multiple eras, meant to serve as "a chronology of 350 years of the play's existence, like the patina on old bronze." The combination of styles is made to reference the production history of the play as well as draw on modern aesthetics familiar to 20th century audiences.

In his production notes, Jarman states that he took stylistic inspiration from films such as Rosemary's Baby (1968) and films produced by Hammer Film Productions.

Jarman utilizes blue filters and voice-over narration, including the sounds of heavy breathing, to emphasize the film's dream framing device.

=== Text ===
A large amount of Shakespeare's original text is cut from this adaptation, with Jarman restructuring and reordering the lines he kept for the screenplay. Toyah Willcox, who played Miranda, said: "Derek cut out the boring bits, which I'm very grateful for, because Shakespeare doesn't half gabble on."

Jarman employs cut-up technique in this restructuring, most notably moving the masque sequence from act 4 of Shakespeare's text to the end of the film, and spreading out expositional dialogue over the course of the film, instead of limiting it to the early scenes as the play does.

== Release ==
=== Critical response ===
The film was well received by most of the prominent film critics on its release in Britain. It holds an 80% rating on Rotten Tomatoes, based on an aggregate of 5 reviews. Vincent Canby of The New York Times gave the film a negative review, calling it "sand in spinach" and "a fingernail scratched along a blackboard".

The film garnered criticism from scholars such as Kate Chedgzoy and Colin MacCabe for Jarman's choice to forgo the common post-colonial interpretation of the play by casting the roles of Caliban and Sycorax with white actors. Jarman responded in interviews, stating that he believed that following the common interpretation would "load the whole film one way, make it more specific than general."

=== Home media ===
The film was released in 2008 by Kino International as part of The Derek Jarman Collection, a four DVD box set. The set features Jarman's Sebastiane (1976) and War Requiem (1989), as well as Isaac Julien's 2008 documentary Derek.

== See also ==
- List of William Shakespeare film adaptations
