= Evacuate (album) =

Studio album by Chelsea
- Released: 1982
- Recorded: January 1982
- Studio: Matrix Studios, London
- Genre: Punk rock
- Label: Step Forward
- Producer: Harry T. Murlowski

Chelsea chronology
Alternative Hits (1980)	Evacuate (1982)	Original Sinners (1985)

Professional ratings
Review scores
Source	Rating
AllMusic	3/5 stars

Evacuate is the second studio album released by British punk rock band Chelsea. Originally released in 1982 by Step Forward Records, it was reissued in 2008 by Captain Oi! Records.

The cover features former drummer of The Meteors Mark Robertson although he didn't actually play on the recording.

== Track listing ==
1. "Evacuate" - (Nic Austin) - 3:46
2. "How Do You Know" - (Gene October, Stephen Corfield) - 3:24
3. "Cover Up" - (Austin) - 3:06
4. "Looks Right" - (Austin) - 3:17
5. "Tribal Song" - (October) - 5:44
6. "War Across the Nation" - (Austin) - 3:11
7. "Forty People" - (October, Austin) - 2:59
8. "Running Free" - (Paul Lincoln) - 2:54
9. "Last Drink" - (Austin) - 2:53
10. "Only Thinking" - (October, Austin) - 4:56

Bonus Tracks:

11. "Rockin' Horse" - 4:01
12. "Years Away" - 3:23
13. "Freemans" - 3:13
14. "ID Parade" - 3:01
15. "How Do You Know" (single version) - 3:15
16. "New Era" - 3:50
17. "War Across the Nation" (single version) - 3:03
18. "Stand Out" - 3:33
