= Aleksander Kolkowski =

British musician and composer (born 1959)

- Born: 1959 (age 66–67)
- Origin: London, England
- Genres: Historical, contemporary, experimental
- Occupations: Composer, musician
- Instruments: Violin, viola, phonograph, gramophone
- Years active: 1980–present

Aleksander Kolkowski (born 1959 in London) is a British musician and composer whose work combines instruments and machines from the pioneering era of sound recording and reproduction (Stroh violins, wind-up Gramophones, shellac discs and wax-phonograph cylinders) to make live mechanical-acoustic music. He lives and works in London, England.

== About ==
Kolkowski studied music at the University of London, Goldsmiths College, violin with Clarence Myerscough at the Royal Academy of Music. Taught by John Tilbury, Hugh Davies and in 1982 participated in seminars and performances directed by John Cage. In the late 1970s, Kolkowski played on the then burgeoning punk rock scene in London, featuring on the records of Henry Badowski, an early member of The Damned, a British multi-instrumentalist, songwriter, and composer, who was a member of several punk rock bands in the 1970s. Kolkowski played violins on Badowski's post punk album, Life Is a Grand..., alongside sometime Generation X (band) guitarist, James Stevenson (musician) and Dave Berk, drummer with Johnny Moped, an early Stiff Records punk rock band from the late 70s' first wave of punk in England.

Over the past 25 years he has worked internationally as an improvising violinist, interpreter, solo performer and composer for dance, theatre and film (Sasha Waltz, Performance artist Rose English, Corinna Harfouch and Butoh dancer Anzu Furukawa amongst others). He created several mixed-media projects in the UK and in Germany together with artists, film-makers and choreographers. From 1996 to 2003 he was resident in Berlin.

His latest work combines instruments and machines from the pioneering era of sound recording and reproduction (Stroh instruments, wind-up Gramophones, shellac discs and wax-cylinder Phonographs) to make live mechanical-acoustic music. Since 1999, he has actively explored the potential of pre-electronic sound reproduction technology in live performance. This work has been shown in Germany, Holland, Poland, Italy, Austria and the US, and featured on WDR and Deutschlandradio radio stations.

In 2002 he founded Recording Angels, a series that examines our relationships to recorded sound using antiquated home-recording devices such as Phonographs and acetate record cutters in performances and installations. Projects include "Voices and Etchings" for 6 singers and Gramophones (Staatsbankberlin, 2003) and "Mechanical Landscape with Bird" (MaerzMusik, Berlin 2004), featuring live singing canaries, wax cylinder Phonograph recordings and a rotating horned string quartet. Collaborations with artists include: Martin Riches, Apartment House, Kairos Quartett, Ute Wassermann, Anna Clementi, Aki Takase, Tony Buck, Hayley Newman, Phil Minton, Tristan Honsinger, Tony Oxley, Evan Parker, Sainkho Namchylak, Louis Moholo, Jon Rose, Matt Wand, Richard Barrett, Phill Niblock, Christian Wolff, Claus van Bebber, Boris Hegenbart, and many, many others.

Since 2013 Kolkowski is a collaborator in The X-Ray Audio Project by The Real Tuesday Weld frontman Stephen Coates. In 2015 Kolkowski was selected for a residency with the British Library Sound Archive.

== Selection of works with gramophones and phonographs (2003–2007) ==
- "The Saragossa Manuscript" (2007)

Composition of a live score for the classic polish baroque fantasy movie by Wojciech Has, British Film Institute, London

- "Recordette" (2007)

Installation-workshop for Transmediale 07, Berlin and Edition Edison. Academy of Arts, Berlin

- "What hath God wrought?” (2006)

Stroh String Quartet composition. Kettle's Yard, New Music Commission. Performed by Apartment House String Quartet, Kettle's Yard, Cambridge, UK BBC Radio 3 live recording and performance May/June 2007

- "Horn Driver" (2006)

Duo performance with Boris Hegenbart [#/TAU] Mechanical-acoustic music from a Stroh violin, Gramophone and Phonograph electronically manipulated and played back through the very same horns of the antique instrument and machines.

- "Figs fly tiny" – for Glyn Perrin (2005)

Solo performance with Stroh cello, 2 musical saws, CD players, speakerdrivers and custom built electronics. Festival Experimentelle Musik Munich

- Recording Angels: "Cheep Imitation" (2004)

for Stroh violin, Serinette (bird organ), Gramophone, Phonograph with specially made recordings of birdsong on wax cylinders and 78 rpm acetate records – A collaboration with sound artist Martin Riches. Commissioned by Stare über Berlin Birdsong symposium and new music festival, Berlin. Seltsame Music, Festival, Klangforum Krems, Austria, Festival Experimentelle Musik Munich, and Festival of Exiles, Berlin

- "Discography" (2004)

Schools project with artists Hayley Newman & Matt Wand. Field recordings, record cutting and cover art with pupils aged 11–13 years. Ikon Gallery, Birmingham

- "Lac" (2004)

Collaboration with sound-artist and record producer Matt Wand (Hot Air). Record cutting and Phonograph recordings of electronic music, Futursonic Festival, Manchester

- Recording Angels: "Mechanical Landscape with Bird" (2004)

for 8 singing canaries, Serinette (bird-organ), 2 Phonographs and a rotating string quartet with horned instruments. Commissioned by Maerz Musik – Festival für aktuelle Musik, Sophiensæle, Berlin

- "Portrait in Shellac" (2001–2004) – Solos for Stroh violin, 3 Gramophones, Phonograph, self-recorded acetate records and wax cylinders, sound-effects records.

Festival Experimentelle Musik, Munich

- Recording Angels- "Quattro Ex Machina Part 1" (2002) and Part 3 (2003)

For flute, trombone, 2 Stroh violins and 4 Gramophones with self-recorded acetate discs.

- Phonograph Arcade (2003)

Installation work with self-recorded Wax cylinders and Phonograph with attached earpieces. Outer Ear Festival of Sound, Chicago

- "Fürstinnen" (2003)

Theatre music and Gramophone/horn installation for Female Line. Sophiensæle, Berlin

- “Der Ring des Nibelungen” (2003)

Richard Wagner – Historic recordings on 78 rpm and wax cylinders. Concert series with original archive recordings, historic Gramophones and Phonographs. Deutsches Musikarchiv and Staatsbankberlin, Berlin

- Claus van Bebber and Aleks Kolkowski – Turntable concerts with vinyl and shellac (2003)

Electric and acoustic reproduction. Podewil and Staatsbankberlin, Berlin

- Recording Angels – "Voices and Etchings" (2003 )

Concert and live Phonograph recordings with Anna Clementi and Phil Minton – vocals. Quattro Ex Machina Part 2 for 4 singers, acetate disc recordings. Staatsbankberlin, Berlin, Seltsame Musik Festival, Munich and Kontraste, Krems/Austria

- Wireless – "Music for a Room" (2003)

A musical séance for Stroh violin, violinophone, tuba, Gramophones and Phonographs. Konzerthaus Berlin
