= Evacuees =

Evacuees may refer to:

- People who have undergone evacuation
- The Evacuees, a 1975 BBC Play for Today by Jack Rosenthal
