= Evac =

Evac may refer to:

- Evacuation (disambiguation)
- Evac (Transformers), fictional character
- Ethylene-Vinyl Acetate Copolymer
