= Life Is a Grand... =

Studio album by Henry Badowski
- Released: June 1981
- Studio: Matrix Studio, London
- Length: 38:31
- Label: A&M
- Producer: Henry Badowski; Wally Brill

Life Is a Grand... is the only full-length release from multi-instrumentalist, songwriter and composer Henry Badowski.

== Track listing ==
All tracks composed by Badowski, except where indicated.

1. "My Face" 3:20
2. "Henry's in Love" 3:09
3. "Swimming With The Fish in the Sea" 4:46
4. "The Inside Out" 3:27
5. "Life Is a Grand" 3:44
6. "Silver Trees" 3:34
7. "This Was Meant To Be" 3:50
8. "Anywhere Else" (Badowski, James Stevenson) 3:54
9. "Baby, Sign Here With Me" 3:50
10. "Rampant" 4:09

== Personnel ==
- Henry Badowski - voice, saxophones, bass, keyboards, percussion
- James Stevenson - guitar, bass
- Aleksander Kolkowski - violins
- Dave Berk - drums (uncredited)

Technical

- Simon Smart, Wally Brill - engineer
- Michael Ross - art direction, design
- Andrew Douglas - photography
