= James Stevenson (musician) =

British guitarist

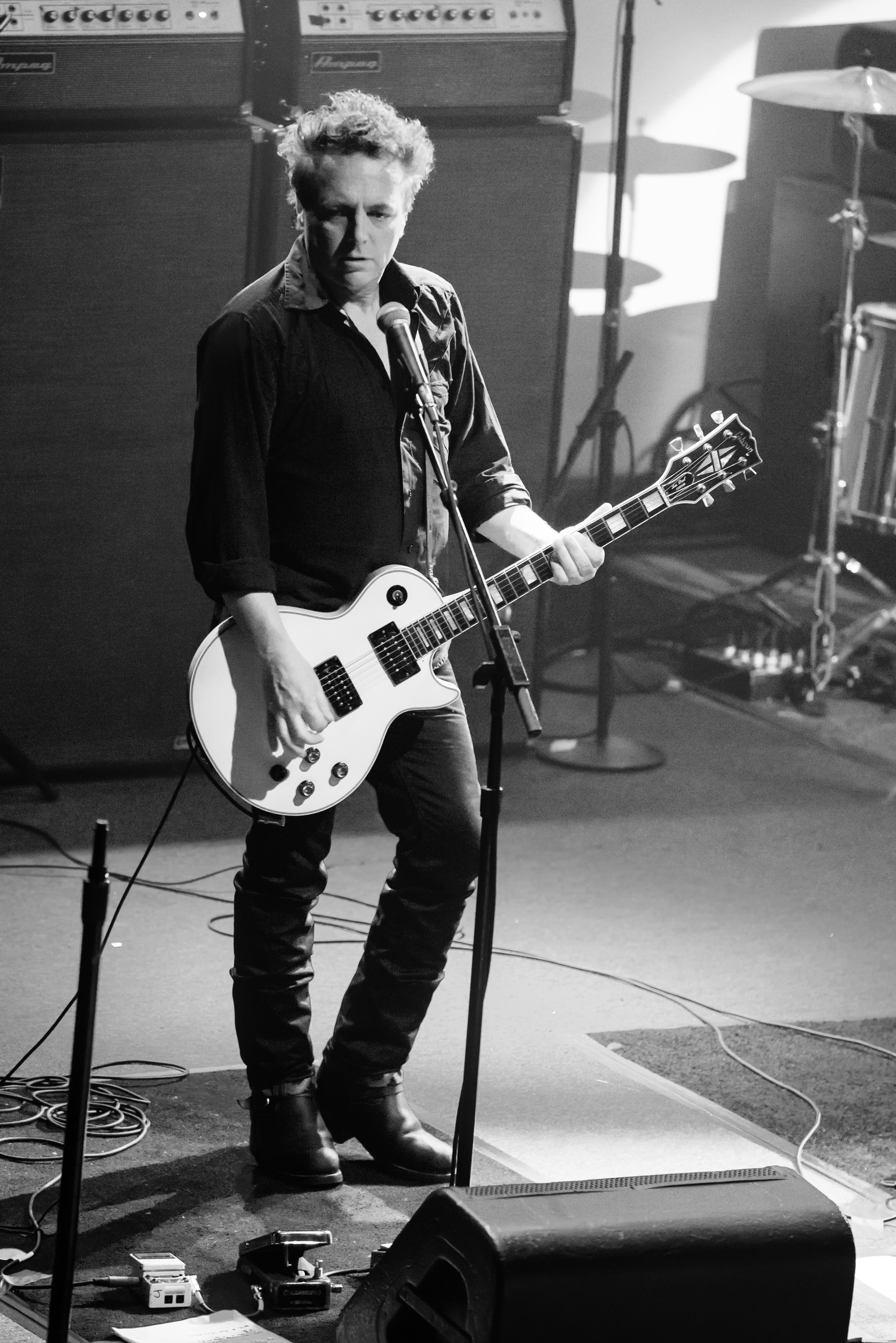

Background information
- Genres: Rock; punk rock; post-punk; new wave
- Occupations: Musician; songwriter
- Instrument: Guitar
- Years active: 1977–present
- Member of: Gene Loves Jezebel; The Alarm; Holy Holy; The International Swingers
- Formerly of: Gen X; The Cult; Chelsea
- Website: www.jamesstevenson.info

James Stevenson is an English guitarist who has performed with the Alarm, Gene Loves Jezebel, Gen X, the Cult, Holy Holy, the International Swingers and Chelsea.

== Career ==
Stevenson started his career with the London-based punk band Chelsea in 1977, while he was still at school studying for A Level exams. He contributed to their early singles and also the first album Chelsea and second Alternative Hits. He was asked to join early punk rock group, Gen X, featuring Billy Idol as its lead guitarist in 1980/1981. After Gen X broke up in early 1981 he worked with Kim Wilde, contributing to her first album, Kim Wilde, and second album, Select, and performing in all of Wilde's early videos including "Kids in America". Stevenson then formed Hot Club with former Sex Pistols bassist Glen Matlock. They released two singles on RAK Records.

In 1983, he toured as a member of Fischer Z singer John Watts' band in support of Watts' album The Iceberg Model. In 1985, he was briefly in a band formed with Glen Matlock and Gary Holton called the Gang Show. Later that year, he was asked to join post-punk band Gene Loves Jezebel when their guitarist left suddenly at the beginning of their first U.S. tour. Stevenson performed on the band's albums Discover, House of Dolls, Kiss of Life, Heavenly Bodies, VII, The Thornfield Sessions, Dance Underwater (2017) and Love Death Sorrow (2023). He produced Gene Loves Jezebel singer Jay Aston's solo album Unpopular Songs, Beki Bondage's solo album Cold Turkey and Gene October's solo album Life and Struggle, among others.

During 1994 and 1995, he provided additional guitar playing for the Cult during their world tour. He also contributed guitar to the song "Brand New You're Retro" by Tricky from his Maxinquaye album. He has contributed as a session guitarist on numerous recordings including artists as diverse as Scott Walker (the Drift and Bish Bosch), Henry Badowski (who he was at Chiswick Community School with), Charlie Harper of the UK Subs, Duncan "Kid" Reid of The Boys, Jimmy Nail, Helen Terry, Annabel Lamb, Louise, Jonathan Perkins and the Hothouse Flowers among others, and has composed music for TV and film.

In 1998, seven years after Mike Peters left the Alarm, he called upon Stevenson to back his solo projects, and the latter has been a permanent fixture in Peters' subsequent musical incarnations, resulting in minor chart success, first under the guise of the Poppyfields with the top 30 hit "45 RPM" in February 2004, and as the Alarm MMVI with the No. 24 single "Superchannel" in February 2006 (from the album Under Attack). He has played on all Alarm albums recorded since 2000 including In the Poppyfields, Under Attack, Counter Attack, Direct Action, Guerilla Tactics, Blood Red, Viral Black, Equals, Sigma, War and Forwards

Stevenson still plays with the Alarm and Gene Loves Jezebel (Jay Aston's version). He also rejoined Chelsea, performing on their Faster, Cheaper and Better Looking (2006), Saturday Night Sunday Morning (2015) and Mission Impossible (2017) albums. He also plays in Matlock's band the Philistines, and has contributed to Matlock's Open Mind and Born Running albums. He sometimes turns up in New York singer/songwriter Willie Nile's band when they play in the UK.

In 2011, Stevenson and Matlock formed supergroup the International Swingers with vocalist Gary Twinn and drummer Clem Burke. Via PledgeMusic, the band raised the money to record their first full-length album, The International Swingers (mixed by Peter Walsh), which was released in 2015.

In January 2013, Stevenson released a three-track CD, "The Shape of Things to Come", via his own website. An album, Everything's Getting Closer to Being Over, followed in March 2014. The album, produced by Peter Walsh, featured Matlock, Steve Norman, Barriemore Barlow, Geoff Dugmore and others.

Stevenson rejoined the Cult as second guitarist for their "Electric 13" world tour throughout North America, Europe and Australia in summer 2013 and continued to tour with them in 2014.

Since 2014, Stevenson has been playing in the band Holy Holy, performing the music of David Bowie, alongside Mick Woodmansey, Tony Visconti and Glenn Gregory, among others. A recording of their London gig in September 2014 was released by Maniac Squat Records in 2015 as a live album, The Man Who Sold the World Live in London.

In the spring of 2017, Gene Loves Jezebel (Jay Aston's version) released their first studio album in 14 years on Westworld Recordings, Dance Underwater. He also contributed to the 2018 Daphne Guinness album Daphne and the Golden Chord, and her 2020 album Revelations, both produced by Tony Visconti.

Recently he has adopted a multi-instrumentalist role in the Alarm playing guitar, bass guitar, bass pedals and a bass/six string double-neck guitar made for him by Gordon-Smith Guitars.

On 9 July 2021, Stevenson released his second solo album The Other Side of the World, dedicated to his younger brother David and his fight against the terminal illness Pick's disease. It was recorded remotely during lockdown and again produced by Peter Walsh. As well as all guitars and lead vocals, Stevenson played all bass guitars too. Guest musicians include Harriet Stubbs, Jessica Lee Morgan, Steve Barnard and Terry Edwards, among others.

In his review of Love Death Sorrow for Goldmine Magazine, Dave Thompson wrote "guitarist Stevenson is simply blazing. Indeed, anyone who thought his recent (2021) solo album The Other Side of the World was the cat’s pajamas has just been introduced to its dressing gown. In terms of (re-)establishing Stevenson’s credentials as the hottest guitarist to emerge from the new wave (he was first sighted in Chelsea, in the first wave of punk), Stevenson is playing some of the most grandiosely incisive guitar of his life right now."

== Personal life ==
His father was the writer John Stevenson. James has been married twice. His second wife was Westworld singer Elizabeth Westwood.

== Discography ==
=== Solo albums ===
- Everything's Getting Closer to Being Over (2014)
- The Other Side of the World (2021)

=== Gene Loves Jezebel ===
- Discover (1986)
- The House of Dolls (1987)
- Kiss of Life (1990)
- Heavenly Bodies (1993)
- Discover (1995)
- In the Afterglow (live) (1995)
- VII (1999)
- The Thornfield Sessions (2003)
- Dance Underwater (2017)
- Love Death Sorrow (2023)

=== Jay Aston ===
- Unpopular Songs (1998)
