= Helen Wellington-Lloyd =

British actress

Helen Wellington-Lloyd, also called Helen of Troy, is an actress originally from South Africa.

She is most notable for being a follower of punk band Sex Pistols in the late 1970s, attending most of their shows until their breakup. She was also one-time lover and later protégée of Malcolm McLaren. Wellington-Lloyd originated the first Sex Pistols "blackmail" typography for flyers and gig posters on the floor of her flat.

She appeared in Derek Jarman's film Jubilee (1977) and The Great Rock 'n' Roll Swindle, by Julien Temple (1980).

Little is known of her whereabouts since the release of The Swindle, except that on 20 September 2001, she auctioned her extensive collection of Sex Pistols memorabilia at Sotheby's in West Kensington, London.

== Portrayals ==
Wellington-Lloyd was portrayed by Francesca Mills in the 2022 miniseries Pistol.

== Filmography ==
- Jubilee (1977)
- Punk Can Take It (1979)
- The Tempest (1979)
- The Great Rock 'n' Roll Swindle (as Helen of Troy) (1980)
