= Zerco =

Moorish jester

Zerco or Zercon was a Moorish dwarf and the jester of the Hunnic king Bleda.

== Quote ==
"On the occasion of the banquet he made his appearance, and threw all except Attila into fits of unquenchable laughter by his appearance, his dress, his voice, and his words, which were a confused jumble of Latin, Hunnic, and Gothic." – Priscus

== In popular culture ==
- Zercon is the protagonist of SDSS1416+13B (Zercon, A Flagpole Sitter), a composition by singer-songwriter Scott Walker. The 21-minute song appears on his 2012 album Bish Bosch, and follows the jester's attempts to escape the cruelty of Attila's court by ascending through history, eventually becoming the titular brown dwarf star and freezing to death.
- Zerco appears in Slave of the Huns by Géza Gárdonyi.
- Zercon is portrayed by Mick Walter in the BBC docudrama series Heroes and Villains.
