= Jack Birkett =

British dancer, mime artist, actor and singer

- in Jubilee (1978)
- Born: 11 June 1934; Leeds, England
- Died: 10 May 2010 (aged 75); London, England
- Other names: Orlando; The Incredible Orlando
- Years active: 1951–1990s

Jack Birkett (11 June 1934 – 10 May 2010) was a British dancer, mime artist, actor and singer, best known for his work on stage as a member of Lindsay Kemp's theatre company, and in the films of Derek Jarman. He was often billed as Orlando or The Incredible Orlando. Most of his best-known work was done when he was totally blind.

== Life and career ==
Birkett was born in Leeds, England. His mother came from a Romani family; his father left home when he was six. He attended Coldcotes School in Gipton until the age of 14, developing a passion for ballet. He worked as an art model for David Hockney and others before finding work at the Grand Theatre in Leeds in 1950 as a stage hand and lighting technician. Soon afterwards, he moved to London, working as a dancer and singer in touring shows and musicals, including the UK tour of Oklahoma! in 1952.

=== With Kemp ===
In 1956, Birkett met Lindsay Kemp, when they were both doing ballet classes with Marie Rambert at the Mercury Theatre, Notting Hill Gate. According to Kemp,

"We were always scraping a living in those early days, often working as stage hands, cooks and cleaners. Sometimes we hitchhiked from venue to venue, carrying our costumes and props."

Both Kemp and Birkett were flamboyant homosexuals. Kemp later wrote:

"Jack was Judy to my Mr Punch, Harlequin to my Pierrot, Titania to my Puck, Herodias to my Salomé, Queen of Hearts to my Lewis Carroll. We shared flats, dressing rooms, boyfriends, bills, good times and bad times, success and failure; a couple of extravagant young dreamers, a couple of aching elders, always entertainers."

He made his West End theatre debut in Bye Bye Birdie in 1961, and also worked with Kemp's company from the early 1960s, taking part in the first Lindsay Kemp Dance Mime Company performances in 1965 that culminated in Illuminations. When working with Kemp in Italy in 1966, he began to lose his sight, attempting a variety of cures ranging from surgery to bee-stings. He nevertheless became entirely blind, but responded by growing more extreme in his performances and his persona. He played the part of Blackbird in Kemp's production of Flowers, based on Jean Genet's Our Lady of the Flowers, which briefly transferred from London to Broadway in 1974, and he continued to tour worldwide with Kemp until the late 1980s.

Described as "a muscular blind man with a completely shaven head", in performances of Turquoise Pantomime:

"Birkett would be led quietly on stage, dressed in black fishnet stockings and a pink waspie. Suddenly he would belt out I Want A Man while a restrained Kemp would occupy himself pulling invisible wires from his ears and wiping non-existent dogshit from his satin shoes."

=== Film and television work ===
Birkett also made a number of TV and film appearances, notably in the work of Derek Jarman. These included portrayals of Borgia Ginz in Jarman's Jubilee (1978), Caliban in Jarman's version of The Tempest (1979) and Thersites in Jonathan Miller's Troilus and Cressida (1981)—part of the BBC Television Shakespeare series, in which Birkett delivered his lines in the manner of a drag queen. He also played the Pope in Jarman's Caravaggio (1986), and Pontius in The Garden (1990). He also appeared in the Spanish films El vent de l'illa (1988) and El niño de la luna (1989).

== Retirement ==
Birkett later retired from performing, living in Barcelona and finally in London. He studied shiatsu. He was supported by long-time partner Nyako Nakar, a Spanish writer and artist. He died in London in 2010 at the age of 75.

== Filmography ==
Year	Title	Role	Notes
1969	Pierrot in Turquoise (aka The Looking Glass Murders)	Harlequin	Filmed by Scottish Television and broadcast in July 1970.
1978	Jubilee	Borgia Ginz	
1979	The Tempest	Caliban, a savage and deformed slave	
1985	The Bride	Blind Man	
1986	Caravaggio	The Pope	
1988	El vent de l'illa		
1989	Moon Child	Inválido	
1990	The Garden	Pontius	Final film role.
