= The House of Dolls (album) =

Studio album by Gene Loves Jezebel
- Released: 1987
- Genre: Rock
- Label: Beggars Banquet, Geffen
- Producer: Peter Walsh, Jimmy Iovine, Chas Sandford

Gene Loves Jezebel chronology
Discover (1986)	The House of Dolls (1987)	Kiss of Life (1990)

Singles from The House of Dolls
- 1. "The Motion of Love" Released: 1987; 2. "Gorgeous" Released: 1987; 3. "Every Door" Released: 1988

The House of Dolls is the fourth album by the British band Gene Loves Jezebel, released in 1987. It was the last Gene Loves Jezebel album the Aston brothers recorded together. The first single was "Motion of Love". The band supported the album with a North American tour that included shows with Flesh for Lulu. It peaked at No. 108 on the Billboard 200 and No. 81 on the UK Albums Chart. "Twenty Killer Hurts" appeared in an episode of Miami Vice.

== Production ==
The album was produced primarily by Peter Walsh. After the difficult sessions for their previous album, Gene Loves Jezebel focused on writing pop songs for The House of Dolls. The Dolls sessions were also strained, due to the relationship between the Aston brothers, with disagreements over vocals and songs. The band did not enjoy working with Iovine, who they thought was inattentive and expensive; they claimed that it took six weeks to record two tracks with him.

== Critical reception ==
Professional ratings
Review scores
Source	Rating
AllMusic	4/5 stars
Alternative Rock	7/10
The Encyclopedia of Popular Music	2/5 stars
The Great Indie Discography	5/10
Los Angeles Times	2.5/4 stars
Tamworth Herald	5/5 stars
Telegraph & Argus	3/5 stars

The Los Angeles Times said that "Gene Loves Jezebel has combined its pseudo-mystical post-punk beginnings, a tad of the ol' glam rock, a guitar sound partially copped from U2 and a solid backbeat to create a bridge between New Romanticism and New Metal." The Washington Post noted that "in planing the edges of their sounds, Gene has lost some of its atmospheric depth", but stated that The House of Dolls is the band's "most consistent" album. The Whig-Standard called the band "a group of heavy rock-popsters in the vein of Bon Jovi."

The Sun Sentinel considered the album to be "a bit on the shrieky preachy side". The Tamworth Herald praised the opening two tracks, opining that the choruses "deserve to slaughter the charts." The Morning Call panned the vocals, which often turned to "screams, whoops and hollering".

The Trouser Press Record Guide noted the "clearly articulated and tuneful arena guitar rock".

== Track listing ==
No.	Title	Length
1.	"Gorgeous"
2.	"The Motion of Love"
3.	"Set Me Free"
4.	"Suspicion"
5.	"Every Door"
6.	"Twenty Killer Hurts"
7.	"Treasure"
8.	"Message"
9.	"Drowning Crazy"
10.	"Up There"
