= The Drift =

Studio album by Scott Walker
- Released: 8 May 2006
- Recorded: June 2004 – November 2005
- Studios: Metropolis Studios, Chiswick, London, and AIR Studios, Hampstead, London
- Genres: Avant-garde; experimental; gothic rock
- Length: 68:48
- Label: 4AD
- Producers: Scott Walker, Peter Walsh

Scott Walker chronology
| 5 Easy Pieces (2003) | The Drift (2006) | And Who Shall Go to the Ball? And What Shall Go to the Ball? (2007) |

The Drift is the thirteenth solo studio album by American singer-songwriter Scott Walker, released on 8 May 2006 on 4AD. Apart from composing the soundtrack to the film Pola X, the album was Walker's first studio album in eleven years and only his third studio album since the final disbanding of The Walker Brothers in 1978. Walker composed the songs for the album slowly over the decade after the release of 1995's Tilt, beginning with "Cue" (the longest song to complete), up until the album's recording. An early version of "Psoriatic" was premiered at the Meltdown festival on 17 June 2000 under the title "Thimble Rigging".

The album was recorded over a period of 17 months at Metropolis Studios in Chiswick, London, with orchestra recorded in one day at George Martin's AIR Studios in Hampstead, London. Receiving mostly positive reviews from critics before its release, the album was released as an LP and CD in May 2006. The artwork for the album was designed by Vaughan Oliver at v23 with assistance from Chris Bigg and photography by Marc Atkins.

== Overview ==
Walker's first album composed entirely of new material since 1995's Tilt, The Drift forms the second installment of what Walker later called "kind of a trilogy" that concluded with 2012's Bish Bosch. In the years between Tilt and The Drift, Walker's released output comprised a few instrumental tracks on the soundtrack to the film Pola X, a cover of Bob Dylan's "I Threw It All Away" on the To Have and to Hold soundtrack, and "Only Myself to Blame" from The World Is Not Enough soundtrack, as well as a few compilations of previously released material, including the retrospective box set 5 Easy Pieces.

The Drift has been cited by many critics and fans alike as a disturbing and complex album that departs from Scott Walker's previous albums while still remaining true to his experimental roots. French singer Vanessa Contenay-Quinones appears as the voice of Clara Petacci on "Clara".

The sound and subject matter for the album is unrelentingly dark and unsettling, often juxtaposing quiet sections with sudden loud noise to induce discomfort in the listener. Subjects include torture, disease, 9/11, Elvis Presley and his stillborn twin brother Jesse Garon Presley, the death and subsequent public hanging of Benito Mussolini and his mistress Clara Petacci, and the Srebrenica massacre.

In a bonus interview for the documentary Scott Walker: 30 Century Man, Walker states the album has commonalities with conceptual art as well as poetry.

Professional ratings
Aggregate scores
| Source | Rating |
|---|---|
| Metacritic | 85/100 |
Review scores
| Source | Rating |
| AllMusic | 4.5/5 stars |
| Alternative Press | 5/5 |
| The Guardian | 5/5 stars |
| The Independent | 3/5 stars |
| Mojo | 4/5 stars |
| MusicOMH | 5/5 stars |
| The Observer | 5/5 stars |
| Pitchfork | 9.0/10 |
| Playlouder | 4.5/5 stars |
| The Times | 3/5 stars |

== Track listing ==
All tracks are written by Scott Walker, except "Psoriatic" (Scott Walker/Bob Carleton).

| No. | Title | Length |
|---|---|---|
| 1. | "Cossacks Are" | 4:32 |
| 2. | "Clara" | 12:43 |
| 3. | "Jesse" | 6:28 |
| 4. | "Jolson and Jones" | 7:45 |
| 5. | "Cue" | 10:27 |
| 6. | "Hand Me Ups" | 5:49 |
| 7. | "Buzzers" | 6:39 |
| 8. | "Psoriatic" | 5:51 |
| 9. | "The Escape" | 5:18 |
| 10. | "A Lover Loves" | 3:11 |

== Personnel ==
- Scott Walker – vocals, guitar, harmonica, saxophone, sound treatment
- Hugh Burns – guitar
- Ian Thomas – drums
- Mark Warman – keyboards, orchestration, conducting, percussion, woodwinds, sound treatment
- Philip Sheppard – orchestration, conducting, cello
- Alasdair Malloy – percussion, drums
- John Giblin – bass
- Steve Pearce – bass
- Peter Walsh – sound treatment, sitar guitar, percussion
- Andrew Cronshaw – woodwinds, concertina
- James Stevenson – guitar
- Brian Gascoigne – keyboards, sound treatment
- Thomas Bowes – violin
- Vanessa Contenay-Quinones – vocals
- Beverly Foster – voice
- Pete Long – saxophone
- Rohan Onraet – percussion
- Lucy Painter – vocals
- Rebecca Painter – vocals
- Ralph Warman – vocals
- Derek Watkins – flugelhorn

| Session 1 | Violin I | Violin II | Cello | Bass |
|---|---|---|---|---|
| | Janice Graham; Paul Willey | Steve Morris; Simon Smith | Alistair Blayden; Nick Roberts | Neil Tarlton; Chris West |
| | Julian Tear; Ofer Falk | Deborah Widdup; Alison Kelly | Jane Fenton; Andrew Fuller | Matthew Corman; Clare Tyack |
| | Sophie Barber; Ben Buckton | Clive Dobbins; Amanda Smith | John Tunnell; Tamsy Kaner | Roger Linley; Diane Clark |
| | Clare Hoffman; Elizabeth Wexler | Ulrike Kipp; Jo Godden | Judith Herbert; Jackie Phillips |
| | Karen Leishman; Matthew Scrivener | Ruth Funnell; Sue Briscoe | Robert Max; Roberto Sorrentino |

| Session 2 | Violin I | Violin II | Cello | Bass |
|---|---|---|---|---|
| | Michael Davis; Paul Willey | Steve Morris; Simon Smith | Alistair Blayden; Nick Roberts | Neil Tarlton; Chris West |
| | Julian Tear; Ofer Falk | Deborah Widdup; Alison Kelly | Jane Fenton; Andrew Fuller | Matthew Corman; Clare Tyack |
| | Sophie Barber; Ben Buckton | Clive Dobbins; Amanda Smith | John Tunnell; Tamsy Kaner | Roger Linley; Diane Clark |
| | Clare Hoffman; Elizabeth Wexler | Ulrike Kipp; Jo Godden | Judith Herbert; Jackie Phillips |
| | Ralph De Souza; Robert Salter | Charles Sewart; Celia Sheen | Jonathan Williams; Joely Koos |

== Production ==
- Produced by Scott Walker & Peter Walsh
- Engineers: Geoff Foster, Peter Walsh
- Mixing: Peter Walsh

== Release history ==
| Region | Date | Label | Format | Catalogue |
|---|---|---|---|---|
| United Kingdom | 8 May 2006 | 4AD | 2×LP | CAD 2603 |
| United Kingdom | 8 May 2006 | 4AD | CD | CAD 2603 CD |
| United States | 6 June 2006 | 4AD | CD | |
| Japan | 24 June 2006 | Hostess | CD | HSE-20015 |

== Charts ==
| Chart | Position |
|---|---|
| Belgian Albums Chart | 49 |
| German Albums Chart | 97 |
| Irish Albums Chart | 80 |
| UK Albums Chart | 51 |
