= Claire Davenport =

English actress (1933–2002)

- Born: Claire Bernice Davenport; 24 April 1933; Sale, Cheshire, England
- Died: 25 February 2002 (aged 68); London, England
- Occupation: actress
- Years active: 1961 - 1994

Claire Bernice Davenport (24 April 1933 – 25 February 2002) was an English character actress well known for her large physique.

== Life and career ==
Davenport was born on 24 April 1933 in Sale, Cheshire, and began acting in 1961 with a theatre role in Caesar and Cleopatra at the Playhouse in Oxford.

Her film work includes roles in Return of the Jedi (as Yarna d'al' Gargan, originally billed as "Fat Dancer"), The Return of the Pink Panther, Adventures of a Plumber's Mate, Carry On Emmannuelle, The Tempest and The Elephant Man. On television, she appeared in The Dick Emery Show, Remington Steele, Doctor Who, Minder, George and Mildred, Robin's Nest, Fawlty Towers and at least three episodes of On the Buses, among others. She also made a cameo appearance in an episode of Mind Your Language. Among the last of her television appearances was a 1993 episode of The Smell of Reeves and Mortimer.

== Death ==
Davenport stopped working after suffering a series of strokes in the 1990s. She died at the age of 68 in London on 25 February 2002 from kidney failure.

== Filmography ==
=== Film ===
Year	Title	Role	Notes
1963	Ladies Who Do	Passerby	Uncredited
1969	Crossplot	Wedding guest	
1969	Carry On Again Doctor	Wedding Guest	Uncredited
1970	Some Will, Some Won't	Blowzy Woman	
1971	On the Buses	Peggy	
1973	The Best Pair of Legs in the Business	Eating lady	
1975	The Return of the Pink Panther	Masseuse	
1976	The Bawdy Adventures of Tom Jones	Mrs Bakewell	Uncredited
1976	The Pink Panther Strikes Again	Hotel Maid	Scenes deleted
1976	Intimate Games	Fat stripper	
1978	Rosie Dixon - Night Nurse	Mrs Buchanan	
1978	Jubilee	First Customs Lady	
1978	Adventures of a Plumber's Mate	Belinda	
1978	Carry On Emmannuelle	Blonde in pub	
1979	The Tempest	Sycorax	
1979	Birth of the Beatles	Nude	
1980	The Elephant Man	Fat Lady	
1983	Screamtime	Mrs. Harlett	Uncredited
1983	Return of the Jedi	Yarna d'al' Gargan	
1989	War Requiem	Charge Sister / Britannia	
1990	Camping	English camper	

== Partial television roles ==
Year	Title	Role
1962	Bulldog Breed	Landlady
1963	The Rag Trade	Myrtle
1964	Doctor Who	The Empress
1964	Love Story	Miss Denning
1964	Crossroads	Miss Montgomery
1965	The Sullavan Brothers	Mrs Melvin
1966	The Baron	Anna Lubovitch
1966	Gideon's Way	Helen
1966	Ways with Words	Woman in restaurant
1968	George and the Dragon	Samantha
1968	ITV Playhouse	Mrs Mosscrop
1968	Theatre 625	Mrs Bliss
1968	Boy meets Girl	Nurse Vileski
1969	Armchair Theatre	Mrs Kapodis
1970	W. Somerset Maugham	Rosa
1970	The Other Reg Varney	Various characters
1971	Play for Today	Nurse
1971	The Misfit	Boris
1971	Queenie's Castle	Glenda
1972	Stage 2	Woman
1972	Menace	Barmaid
1973	On the Buses	Mrs Webb
1973	The Song of Songs	Neighbour
1973	Hey Brian!	Woman
1973	Pollyanna	Mrs Spencer
1974	Shoulder to Shoulder	Nurse Pine
1975	Fawlty Towers	Mrs Wilson
1975	Don't Drink The Water	Bertha
1975	I Didn't Know You Cared	Mrs Skelhorn
1976	Couples	Mrs Bagley
1976	George and Mildred	Shop assistant
1977	The Fuzz	Miss Bullock
1978	Angels	Doreen Smith
1978	George and Mildred	Gloria Rumbold
1979	Mind Your Language	Eva
1981	Metal Mickey	Cavewoman
1983–1985	By the Sword Divided	Mrs Dumfrey
1985	Minder	Nigel's Mum
1986	Alice in Wonderland	The Duchess

== Bibliography ==
- Noble, Peter, ed. (1982). 1982 Screen International Film And TV Year Book. London: King Publications.
