= Henry Badowski =

English musician

- Born: 3 October 1958 (age 67); North Kensington, Greater London, United Kingdom
- Genres: Punk rock, new wave
- Instruments: Vocals, flute, bass, saxophone, keyboards
- Years active: 1977–1981
- Labels: Deptford Fun City, A&M, I.R.S.
- Formerly of: Chelsea; King; The Damned; Wreckless Eric; The Good Missionaries

Henry Badowski (born 3 October 1958) is a British multi-instrumentalist, songwriter, and composer, who was a member of several punk rock bands in the 1970s before embarking on a solo career.

== Career ==
Badowski's apprenticeship started in several UK bands including Norman Hounds and the Baskervilles, Lick It Dry and the New Rockets. Badowski joined his friend, guitarist James Stevenson, in Gene October's Chelsea as bassist in March 1977 despite having "barely picked up a bass guitar in [his] life". He moved on to play Vox Continental organ in Wreckless Eric's band, before forming the band King as vocalist and keyboard player along with Captain Sensible, who described Badowski as "a genius".

Badowski was invited by Sensible to join a short-lived incarnation of The Damned to replace Lemmy, at which time they went by the name The Doomed. He then drummed for Mark Perry's post-Alternative TV band The Good Missionaries, playing on the Fire From Heaven album in 1979, and also got some studio time to work on his first solo release, the "Baby Sign Here With Me/Making Love with My Wife" single, released by Deptford Fun City Records, one of Miles Copeland III's labels, and packaged in a gold foil sleeve.

Badowski's solo career began in the summer of 1979, with the release of "Making Love with My Wife" on Deptford Fun City label. Recorded at Pathway Studios, the track was performed completely by Badowski and displayed a strong 1960s influence, with airs of Syd Barrett and Kevin Ayers. Pathway Studios was an independent recording studio in North London which became an early favorite of Stiff Records' Dave Robinson and Jake Riviera, and was the location for early recordings by The Damned, Madness, Elvis Costello, Squeeze, Lene Lovich, John Foxx, and the Police.The B-side "Baby Sign Here With Me", utilized the talents of James Stevenson (bass/guitar) from Chelsea, Alex Kolkowski (violin) and Dave Berk (drums) from the Johnny Moped Band. He signed to A&M Records/I.R.S. Records for subsequent solo releases, including the album Life is a Grand..., from which the singles "My Face" and "Henry's in Love" were drawn. Badowski played most of the instruments on the album himself, but with contributions from Stevenson, violinist Aleksander Kolkowski, and drummer Dave Berk (of Johnny Moped). Although the album met with a favourable response from critics, it proved to be his final solo release.

== Solo discography ==
=== Albums ===
- Life is a Grand... (1981), A&M

=== Singles ===
- "Making Love with My Wife"/"Baby Sign Here With Me" (1979), Deptford Fun City
- "Baby Sign Here With Me"/"Making Love with My Wife" (1979), A&M
- "My Face"/"Four More Seasons" (1980), A&M
- "My Face"/"Making Love with My Wife" (1980), IRS
- "Henry's in Love"/"Lamb to the Slaughter" (1981), A&M

=== Compilation appearances ===
- "Making Love With My Wife" on Machines (1980), Virgin
- "My Face" on I.R.S. Greatest Hits Volume 1 (1980) I.R.S.
- "Baby Sign Here With Me" on I.R.S. Greatest Hits Vols. 2 & 3 (1981) I.R.S.
