= Chloe Chua =

Singaporean violinist (born 2007)

Chloe Chua 蔡珂宜
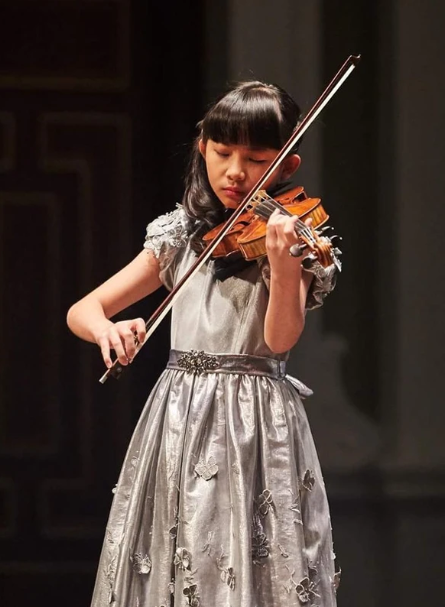
- Chloe Chua performing at the 2018 Young Talents Project

Background information
- Born: 7 January 2007 (age 19); Singapore
- Genre: Classical
- Occupation: Violinist
- Instrument: Violin
- Website: chloechuaviolinist.com

Chinese name
- Chinese: 蔡珂宜
Transcriptions
Standard Mandarin
- Hanyu Pinyin: Cài Kēyí

Chloe Chua (蔡珂宜; Cài Kēyí) (born 7 January 2007) is a Singaporean violinist. She won first prize in the Junior division of the 2018 Yehudi Menuhin International Competition for Young Violinists alongside Australian Christian Li, and also won the 24th Andrea Postacchini International Violin Competition in Category A. She was the artist-in-residence of the Singapore Symphony Orchestra for the 2022/23 and 2023/24 seasons.

== Early life and education ==
Chua was born in Singapore in 2007. She was introduced to the piano at the age of two and a half and to the violin at age four by her mother, a music educator. Her teacher was Yin Ke, who started teaching her at age four at the Nanyang Academy of Fine Arts and School of Young Talents String Section, until she was about 17 years old.

As of May 2025, Chua's website states that she is studying with Professor Kolja Blacher at the Hochschule für Musik Hanns Eisler Berlin.

== Career ==
Chua has performed at the New Virtuosi Queenswood Masterclass, the Singapore Violin Festival, and Chingay Festival.

Chua has also performed with the Singapore Symphony Orchestra, Xiamen Philharmonic Orchestra, Salzburg Chamber Soloists, Russian National Youth Orchestra, Kammerorchester Basel and the China Philharmonic Orchestra. In 2018, she and Christian Li were both awarded first prize in the Junior division of the Menuhin Competition.

After her Menuhin Competition performance, she was featured in the 2018 video "Is Ling Ling a GIRL?" by YouTubers Brett Yang and Eddy Chen of TwoSet Violin, the two visited Chua in September 2020 and held a master class session on Paganiniana, a piece by Nathan Milstein based on Paganini's Caprice No. 24. Chua also took part in a "Ling Ling Workout" with Chen and Yang, released in March 2021, and in a later video, "Our Secret Plan to Get Back into the Menuhin Competition (Ft. Chloe Chua)", released in May 2021.

In 2024, Chua appeared with Scott Yoo in the PBS program Great Performances, "Now Hear This 'Rising Stars'", performing Mozart's Violin Concerto No. 3.

In February 2025, Chua and cellist Ng Pei-Sian of the Singapore Symphony Orchestra performed Brahms’s Double Concerto for Violin and Cello on their inaugural tour of Australia in Sydney, Melbourne, and Brisbane, conducted by Hans Graf. In August 2025, Chua performed Tchaikovsky’s Violin Concerto with the Singapore Symphony Orchestra conducted by Rodolfo Barráez at the Esplanade Concert Hall in Singapore.

In October 2026, Chua performed in two pre-tour concerts with the Singapore Symphony Orchestra at the University Cultural Centre, National University of Singapore, conducted by Hannu Lintu. On 8 October, she performed Mendelssohn's Violin Concerto in E minor, Op. 64. The following evening, she performed Mozart's Sinfonia Concertante in E-flat major, K. 364, alongside violist He Ziyu.

== Instruments ==
Chua has played on violins such as an 1884 Vincenzo Postiglioni loaned from Peter Chew and a one-year loan on a 1625 Amati violin from Florian Leonhard Fine Violins. She currently performs on a Giovanni Battista Guadagnini, Milan 1753, on loan from the Rin Collection.

== Musical appreciation ==
In a 2020 interview while in residence at the Singapore Symphony Orchestra, Chua identified her favourite violinist as Itzhak Perlman and her favourite composer as Pyotr Ilyich Tchaikovsky; she identified the Bach Sonata No. 1 in G minor (BWV 1001) as the most difficult piece in her repertoire. In an interview in 2022, Chua updated the list of her favourite violinists to also include Hilary Hahn and Maxim Vengerov, and from the previous LP recording era, the violinist Jascha Heifetz.

== Discography ==
Chloe Chua's album releases include:

- 2023: Vivaldi: The Four Seasons / Locatelli: Harmonic Labyrinth - with the Singapore Symphony Orchestra
- 2024: Butterfly Lovers & Paganini - with the Singapore Symphony Orchestra
- 2025: Mozart: Violin Concertos - with the Singapore Symphony Orchestra

== Awards ==
- First prize winner, Junior division, Thailand International Strings Competition
- 2015: Third prize winner, Junior division, Singapore National Piano and Violin Competition
- 2016: First prize winner, Junior Category, Symphony 924 Young Talents Project
- 2017: Third prize winner, 2nd Zhuhai International Mozart Competition for Young Musicians Violin Group A
- 2017: First prize winner, Category A, 24th Andrea Postacchini Violin Competition
- 2017: First prize winner, Junior division, Singapore National Piano and Violin Competition
- 2018: First prize winner (joint 1st prize), Junior division, Yehudi Menuhin International Competition for Young Violinists
