= And Who Shall Go to the Ball? And What Shall Go to the Ball? =

EP by Scott Walker
- Released: 1 October 2007
- Genre: Classical; Avant-garde; Experimental
- Length: 24:39
- Label: 4AD
- Producer: Scott Walker, Peter Walsh

Scott Walker chronology
The Drift (2006)	And Who Shall Go to the Ball? And What Shall Go to the Ball? (2007)	Bish Bosch (2012)

Professional ratings
Review scores
Source	Rating
Pitchfork Media	7.0/10
BBC	favorable

And Who Shall Go to the Ball? And What Shall Go to the Ball? is an EP by singer and composer Scott Walker, and his second release for 4AD. The EP was originally commissioned as a contemporary dance piece for disabled and non-disabled dance company CandoCo, choreographed by Rafael Bonachela.

In a press release from his record label, Walker described the music in the following way: "Apart from a slow movement given over to solitude, the music is full of edgy and staccato shapes or cuts, reflecting how we cut up the world around us as a consequence of the shape of our bodies. How much of a body does an intelligence need to be potentially socialised in an age of ever-developing AI? This is but one of many questions that informed the approach to the project."

The EP was issued in just 2500 copies and will, according to the label, never be re-pressed.

== Track listing ==
All tracks are written by Scott Walker.

No.	Title	Length
1.	"And Who Shall Go to the Ball?: 1st Movement"	6:36
2.	"And Who Shall Go to the Ball?: 2nd Movement"	5:29
3.	"And Who Shall Go to the Ball?: 3rd Movement"	6:24
4.	"And Who Shall Go to the Ball?: 4th Movement"	6:10

== Personnel ==
- London Sinfonietta – orchestra
- Philip Sheppard – cello
- Alasdair Malloy – percussion
- Bradley Grant – saxophone, flute
- Andy Findon – saxophone, flute
- Steven Price – recording
- Matt Paul – engineer
- Mick Taylor – engineer
- Peter Walsh – programming, effects, sound manipulation
- Mark Warman – orchestration, programming, effects
