= Bish Bosch =

Studio album by Scott Walker
- Released: 3 December 2012
- Genre: Experimental
- Length: 73:00
- Label: 4AD
- Producers: Scott Walker, Peter Walsh

Scott Walker chronology
And Who Shall Go to the Ball? And What Shall Go to the Ball? (2007)	Bish Bosch (2012)	Soused (2014)

Bish Bosch is the fourteenth and final solo studio album by the American-British singer-songwriter Scott Walker, released on 4AD on 3 December 2012. Walker described it as the final installment in "kind of a trilogy" alongside his prior albums Tilt (1995) and The Drift (2006). At seventy-three minutes, Bish Bosch is Walker's longest album, and it contains his longest song, the twenty-one minute, forty-one second "SDSS1416+13B (Zercon, A Flagpole Sitter)".

== Background and recording ==
Unlike Tilt and The Drift, which both took several years to compose, Bish Bosch was written in just over a year. Walker had set aside a year to focus exclusively on writing, to speed up his process, and described it as "lightning speed". Even so, he still "had to wait and wait and wait almost every single day for the words to come". The music was recorded over a period of two years, with lengthy gaps between sessions due to various problems: trouble booking studios, the death of producer Peter Walsh's father, and the limited availability of musicians (including Walker himself, who scored the dance And Who Shall Go to the Ball? And What Shall Go to the Ball? for The Royal Opera).

Walker got the idea for "SDSS1416+13B (Zercon, A Flagpole Sitter)" while browsing a friend's library and learning of Zerco (or Zercon), the court jester of Attila; he considered Zercon a "fantastic character" and was surprised no one had used him. The song describes Zercon performing for Attila, trying to escape and reach a "spiritual sovereignty", failing, and ultimately becoming a brown dwarf and burning out.

The lyrics of "Epizootics!" merge early jazz slang with an "idea about waking up from a Hawaiian nightmare". "The Day the 'Conducator' Died (An Xmas Song)" was inspired by the trial and execution of Nicolae and Elena Ceaușescu, which took place on Christmas Day in 1989.

Walker explained the title thus:

I knew I'd be playing with language more than I had on any of the previous albums. I wanted the title to introduce you to this kind of idea and reflect the feeling of the album, which was [claps hands briskly] bish bosh. And we know what bish bosh means here in this country – it means job done or sorted. In urban slang bish also [phonetically] means bitch, like "Dis is ma bitch". And then I wrote Bosch like the artist [Hieronymus Bosch]. I was then thinking in the terms of this giant universal female artist. And this idea continued to play through the record in certain spots.

== Release ==
The first music to appear from the album was heard in a promotional video released on October 11, 2012, which featured extracts from the songs "'See You Don't Bump His Head'", "Tar", "Dimple", "Corps De Blah", "Phrasing" and "Epizootics!" set to video clips of Walker and his team working on both the music and artwork. This was followed on November 7 by the release of two full tracks, "Epizootics!" and "'See You Don't Bump His Head'", which were made available on Spotify as a two track "Spotify Exclusive Preview" streaming single. A video for "Epizootics!", directed by Olivier Groulx, followed a day later. Clash Music called the song "a lengthy, often surreal rumination" while NPR said that it was "weirdly funky" and recalled "Fat Mama Kick" from the Walker Brothers' 1978 album Nite Flights.

== Reception ==
Professional ratings
Aggregate scores
Source	Rating
AnyDecentMusic?	7.5/10
Metacritic	78/100
Review scores
Source	Rating
AllMusic	4.5/5 stars
Beats Per Minute	89%
Consequence of Sound	B
The Guardian	4/5 stars
The Independent	4/5 stars
NME	3/10
Pitchfork	8.0/10
Slant Magazine	3.5/5 stars
Spin	8/10
Tiny Mix Tapes	5/5 stars

At Metacritic, which assigns a normalized rating out of 100 to reviews from mainstream critics, the album received an average score of 78, based on 33 professional reviews. The recording was selected as 'Album of the Week' in The Independent, The Guardian and The Sunday Times, 'Album of the Month' in Mojo magazine, and 'Album of the Year' by Tiny Mix Tapes. The album placed 11th in The Wire's annual critics' poll.

== Track listing ==
All tracks composed by Scott Walker.

No.	Title	Length
1.	"'See You Don’t Bump His Head'"	4:06
2.	"Corps De Blah"	10:11
3.	"Phrasing"	4:45
4.	"SDSS1416+13B (Zercon, A Flagpole Sitter)"	21:41
5.	"Epizootics!"	9:40
6.	"Dimple"	6:47
7.	"Tar"	5:39
8.	"Pilgrim"	2:26
9.	"The Day The 'Conducator' Died (An Xmas Song)"	7:45

== Personnel ==
=== Musicians ===
- Scott Walker – vocals, electric guitar (9), keyboards (8, 9), percussion (9)
- Hugh Burns – acoustic guitar (2, 4, 6), electric guitar (1–5, 7), electric baritone guitar (1–5, 7), EBow guitar (1, 4, 7), Dobro (4), ukulele (5), pedal steel guitar (5)
- James Stevenson – electric guitar (2, 4), electric baritone guitar (1, 2, 4), Mando-Guitar (4)
- Alasdair Malloy – percussion (1–7), tuned gongs (6), machetes (7)
- Mark Warman – keyboards (1–7), drum programming (1), tuned gongs (6), handclaps (5), machetes (7)
- Peter Walsh – keyboards (1–7), drum programming (1), finger snaps (5)
- Ian Thomas – drums (2–8)
- John Giblin – bass guitar (2–7), double bass (8)
- Paul Willey – violin (2)
- Michael Laird – kudu horn, shofar (4)
- Pete Long – baritone saxophone (4, 5), tubax (4, 5, 7)
- BJ Cole – pedal steel guitar (5)
- Guy Barker – trumpet (5)
- Tom Rees – trumpet (5)
- Andrew McDonnell – "Lo Rumbles & White Noise" (5)

=== Orchestra ===
- Conductor and orchestrator – Mark Warman (2, 4, 6)
- First violins – Paul Willey, Boguslaw Kostecki, Jonathan Rees, Laura Melhuish, Dave Ogden, Julian Trafford, Abigail Young, Ruth Ehrlich, Ann Morfee, Dave Smith
- Second violins – Steve Morris, Tom Piggott-Smith, Charlie Brown, Elizabet Wexler, Sebastian Rudnicki, Nikki Gleed, Steve Bentley-Klein, Brian Wright, Clive Dobbins, Paddy Roberts
- Celli – Frank Schaefer, Justin Pearson, Chris Fish, Joely Koos, Nerys Richards, Dom Pecheur, Tamsy Kayner, Vicky Metthews
- Double basses – Enno Senft, Chris West, Clare Tyack, Steve Rossell, Stacey Watton, Alice Kent, Stephen Warner, Lucy Hare
