= Christian Li =

Chinese-Australian violinist

Christian Li 李映衡
- Born: October 30, 2007 (age 18); Melbourne, Australia
- Genres: Classical
- Occupation: Musician
- Instrument: Violin
- Labels: Decca Classics
- Website: christianliviolin.com

Chinese name
- Chinese: 李映衡
Transcriptions
Standard Mandarin
- Hanyu Pinyin: Lǐ Yìnghéng

Christian Li (born 30 October 2007) is an Australian violinist. In 2018, at the age of ten, he became the youngest to win the Junior Category of the Yehudi Menuhin International Competition for Young Violinists.

== Biography ==
Christian Li was born in Australia to Chinese parents. His mother, Katherine Liu, who is a first-generation immigrant from China, is an accountant. His father, George Li, a second-generation Chinese born and raised in the United States, is an electrical engineer. Christian Li attended Scotch College in Hawthorn, Melbourne until early 2022. He currently studies at the Yehudi Menuhin School. He began playing violin when he was 5 years old. As of 2020, he was studying music with Robin Wilson, head of violin at Australian National Academy of Music in Melbourne.

In June 2013, when Li had been playing the violin for 8 months, he appeared in a Chinese television commercial playing his violin along with Jacky Cheung.

In 2014, Li won first place in the Golden Beijing violin competition. In 2015, he placed first in the violin category of the Young Artist Semper Music International Competition in Italy. In 2018, he won the junior prize at the Yehudi Menuhin International Competition for Young Violinists, alongside Chloe Chua of Singapore. At age 10, he was the youngest winner in the history of the competition. In addition, he also won the Audience Prize and Composer Award in the Junior section.

In 2016, he performed at Carnegie Hall as part of the American Protégé Showcase 10th Anniversary concert. He has performed with the Australian Brandenburg Orchestra, at the Gower Festival, the Harrogate International Festival, and the Cheltenham Music Festival. In 2019, he suffered a nosebleed during a centre stage performance with the Melbourne Symphony Orchestra which did not stop him from finishing his performance without a break.

In 2020 he signed with Decca Classics at the age of 12 and became the youngest musician to sign with the label; he released his first single the same year. In October 2025, he was loaned the 1699 "Crespi" violin by Stradivari.

== Discography ==
=== Studio albums ===
List of studio albums, with release date and label shown
Title	Album details
Vivaldi: The Four Seasons	Released: 20 August 2021; Label: Decca Classics; Format: CD, digital download, streaming
Discovering Mendelssohn	Released: 7 July 2023; Label: Decca Classics; Format: CD, digital download, streaming
Tchaikovsky: Violin Concerto	Released: 21 February 2025; Label: Decca Classics; Format: CD, digital download, streaming

== Awards and nominations ==
=== ARIA Music Awards ===
The ARIA Music Awards is an annual ceremony presented by Australian Recording Industry Association (ARIA), which recognises excellence, innovation, and achievement across all genres of the music of Australia. They commenced in 1987.

Year	Nominee / work	Award	Result	Ref.
2021	Vivaldi: The Four Seasons	Best Classical Album	Nominated	
