= Chelsea (band) =

English punk rock band

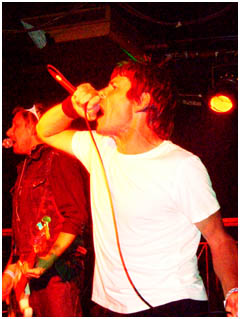
- Chelsea in 2006

Background information
- Origin: London, England
- Genre: Punk rock
- Years active: 1976–present
- Labels: Step-Forward; I.R.S.; Communiqué; Jungle; Alter Ego; Weser; Captain Oi!; Westworld
- Members: Gene October; Nic Austin; Mat Sargent; Gary Ostell; Rob Miller
- Past members: Billy Idol; Tony James; Henry Badowski; James Stevenson; John Towe; Martin Stacy; Bob Jessie; Carey Fortune; Chris Bashford; Geoff Myles; Dave Martin; Tony Barber; Stuart Soulsby; Andy Reid; Billy Gilbert; Lee Morrell; Simon Cade Williams; Steve Grainger; Geoff Sewell
- Website: chelseapunkband.com

Chelsea are an English punk rock band which formed in 1976. Three of the four original band members went on to found Generation X. More than two decades after its release, the band's debut single, "Right to Work", was included in the Mojo list of the best punk rock singles of all time.

== History ==
=== Formation (1976) ===
The original line-up of the band was assembled in late 1976 by John Krivine and Steph Raynor, the owners of Acme Attractions, a fashion boutique shop in King's Road in Chelsea, London, comprising vocalist Gene October, guitarist William Broad (later and better known as Billy Idol), bassist Tony James and drummer John Towe; James and Towe had previously been in London SS. Raynor went on to establish the 'Boy' fashion label that became an icon of post punk British youth culture. The band made their live debut supporting Throbbing Gristle on 18 October 1976 at the Institute of Contemporary Arts, London.

After three support gigs playing cover versions of other bands' songs, Idol and James departed in November 1976, taking Towe with them, to form Generation X.

=== Early singles and Chelsea (1977–1979) ===
October then recruited Carey Fortune (drums), Martin Stacy (guitar) and Bob Jessie (bass), with the last two soon replaced by James Stevenson and Henry Daze (Henry Badowski).

Chelsea's first single, "Right to Work", was released in June 1977 by Step-Forward Records. Recorded by the October/Fortune/Daze/Stevenson line-up of the band, it was their most popular song, and also appeared on the soundtrack album (issued in 1978 by Polydor) to the 1977 Derek Jarman film Jubilee (which October had appeared in). The band were featured in the 1977 documentary film Punk In London with both interviews and a live performance.

Simon Cade Williams, aka Simon Vitesse, joined the band as bassist in 1977 for a UK tour and the band's second single, "High Rise Living". This rapid turnover of band members was characteristic throughout Chelsea's existence, with October the only constant presence.

Chelsea in 1979

On 25 August 1978 the band released another single, "Urban Kids", which was co-written by October and Alternative TV and produced by ex-Who manager Kit Lambert.

After spending 1977–78 touring in the UK and overseas, they released their first album, Chelsea, in 1979.

A singles compilation, Alternative Hits, was released in 1980; it was also issued in the U.S. by I.R.S. Records, retitled No Escape. In 1980 Stevenson left to join Generation X

=== New line-ups, Evacuate and later albums (1982–present) ===
After a split, October put together a new line-up, including guitarist and songwriter Nic Austin, which recorded the critically acclaimed second album Evacuate (1982). Austin wrote or co-wrote the majority of the album’s material..

October sporadically released albums with various Chelsea line-ups throughout the 1980s, including Original Sinners, Rocks Off and Underwraps in which the band were joined by Clash drummer Nicky 'Topper' Headon on a cover of The Clash's song "Somebody Got Murdered" '.

In the early 1990s, a line-up featuring the returning Austin and new bassist Mat Sargent released The Alternative (1993) and Traitors Gate (1994). Austin and Sargent would go on to become key songwriting contributors across several later Chelsea releases.

In 1999, the line-up from the first album, including Stevenson, reformed for the Social Chaos Tour across North America. A live album, Metallic F.O.: Live at CBGB's (released 2002), was recorded at CBGB in New York City during this tour. Augmented by Buzzcocks bassist Tony Barber, the band released Faster, Cheaper and Better Looking in 2005.

Austin and Sargent returned in 2011, and this line-up released the album Saturday Night Sunday Morning in 2015. The Mission Impossible album followed in 2017 with Stevenson guesting on both albums. Both albums were recorded at Panther Studios in Surrey and produced by Dick Crippen of Tenpole Tudor, King Kurt and The Weird Things.

May 2021 saw the release of Chelsea’s 12th studio album Meanwhile Gardens on Westworld Records. The long-standing line up of October, Austin and Sargent was joined by drummer Steve Grainger and featured guest performances from past band members Martin Stacey, James Stevenson, Bob Jesse and Rob Miller. The album was recorded at Panther Studios in between the 2020 COVID lockdowns with Dick Crippen producing. 2022 saw the release of Evacuate-Revisited, a rerecording of the 1982 album for its 40th anniversary. The album was to be a live album but because of the Covid restrictions it was recorded live at Panther Studios and included songs from the live set.. In 2026, founder and vocalist Gene October retired from Chelsea due to ill health following his final performances with the band. With October’s blessing, Chelsea continued with Nic Austin, Mat Sargent and Rob Miller. Former UK Subs drummer Gary Ostell joined the line-up.

== Members ==
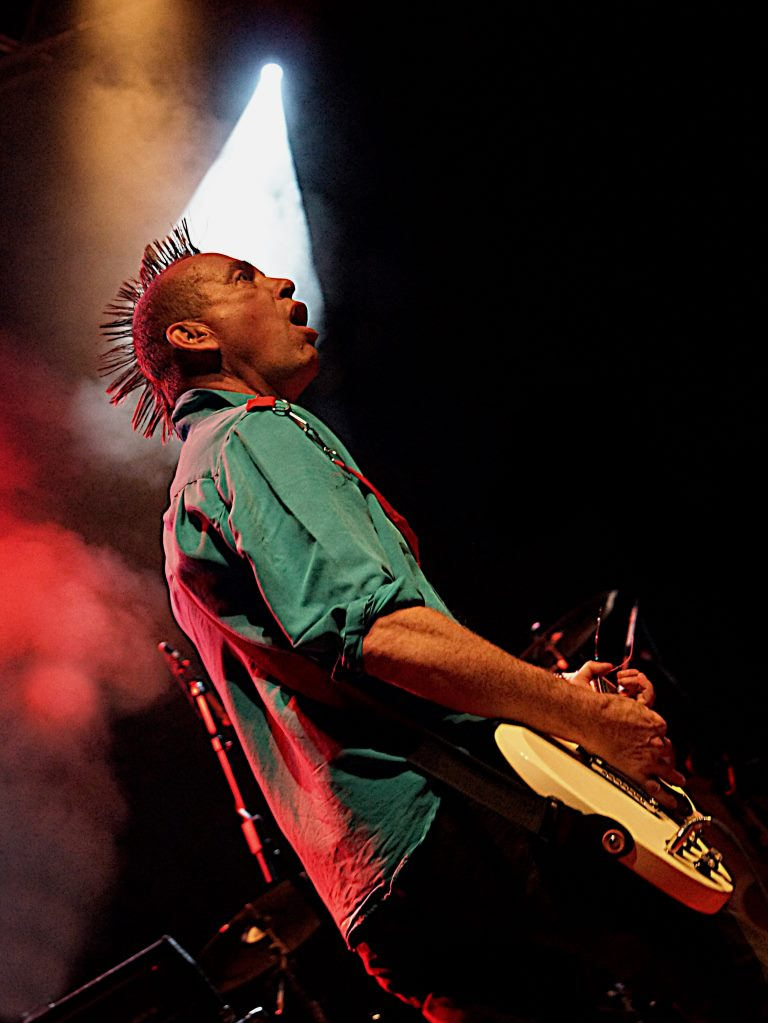
Nic Austin onstage in 2015

=== Current ===
- Gene October – vocals (1976–present)
- Nic Austin – guitar, lead/backing vocals (1981–1984, 1992–1994, 2011–present)
- Mat Sargent – bass, lead/backing vocals (1992–1994, 2011–present)
- Rob Miller – rhythm guitar (1993–1994, 2021–present)
- Gary Ostell - drums (2026 - present)

=== Former ===
- William Broad – guitar (1976)
- Tony James – bass (1976)
- John Towe – drums (1976)
- Carey Fortune – drums (1976–1977)
- Martin Stacey – guitar (1976–1977)
- Bob Jessie – bass (1976–1977)
- James Stevenson – lead guitar, backing vocals (1977–1980, 1999–2017; occasional guest appearances to present)
- Henry Daze – bass (1977)
- Simon Vitesse – bass (1977)
- Dave Martin – rhythm guitar, backing vocals (1979–1980, 1999)
- Geoff Myles – bass (1979–1980, 1999–2001)
- Steve J Jones – drums (1979)
- Chris Bashford – drums (1979–1980, 1999–2005)
- Sol Mintz – drums (1981–1984)
- Tim Griffin – bass (1981)
- Stephen Corfield – guitar (1981)
- Sting – bass (1981; temporary)
- Geoff Sewell – drums (1982–1986)
- Paul Linc – bass (1981–1984)
- Pete Dimmock – bass (1985–1986)
- Mark Rathbone – drums (1986)
- Neil Macdonald – fiddle (1986)
- Phoenix – guitar (1985–1986)
- Jonnie Dee – guitar, vocals (1986)
- Willy Grip – keyboards, guitar (1986)
- Paul Lincoln – bass (1989)
- Jamie Abethell – drums (1989)
- Steve Tannett – guitar (1989)
- Stuart Soulsby – drums (1992–1994)
- Tony Barber – bass (2002–2005)
- Lee Morrell – drums (2011–2018)
- Steve Grainger – drums (2018–2025)

== Discography ==
=== Studio albums ===
- Chelsea (1979, Step-Forward)
- Evacuate (1982, Step-Forward)
- Original Sinners (1985, Communiqué)
- Rocks Off (1986, Jungle)
- Underwraps (1989, I.R.S.)
- The Alternative (1993, Alter Ego)
- Traitors Gate (1994, Weser)
- Faster, Cheaper and Better Looking (2005, Captain Oi!)
- Saturday Night Sunday Morning (2015, Westworld)
- Mission Impossible (2017, Westworld)
- Meanwhile Gardens (2021, Westworld)
- Evacuate Revisited (2022, Audio Platter)

=== Live albums ===
- Live and Well (1984, Picasso)
- Metallic F.O.: Live at CBGB's (2002, Red Steel)
- Live at the Music Machine 1978 (2005, Released Emotions)
- Live and Loud (2005, Harry May)

=== Compilation albums ===
- Alternative Hits (1980, Step-Forward) released as No Escape in USA (1980, I.R.S.)
- Just for the Record (1983, Step-Forward)
- Back Trax (1988, Illegal)
- Unreleased Stuff (1989, Clay)
- Fools and Soldiers (1997, Receiver)
- The Punk Singles Collection 1977-82 (1998, Captain Oi!)
- Punk Rock Rarities (1999, Captain Oi!)
- The BBC Punk Sessions (2001, Captain Oi!)
- Urban Kids - A Punk Rock Anthology (2004, Castle)
- Right to Work - The Singles (2015, Let Them Eat Vinyl)
- Anthologies 1,2 and 3 (2016, Westworld)
- In Session (2017, Westworld)
- Punk Rock Singles Collection (2020, Restless Empire)
- Radio Active Tapes (2022, Gutterwail)
- The Step-Forward Years 1977-82 (2023, Captain Oi!)

=== Singles ===
- "Right to Work" (1977, Step-Forward)
- "High Rise Living" (1977, Step-Forward)
- "Urban Kids" (1978, Step-Forward)
- "Decide" (1979, Step-Forward/I.R.S.)
- "No-One's Coming Outside" (1980, Step-Forward)
- "Look at the Outside" (1980, Step-Forward)
- "No Escape" (1980, Step-Forward)
- "Rockin' Horse" (1981, Step-Forward)
- "Freemans" (1981, Step-Forward)
- "Evacuate" (1981, Step-Forward)
- "War Across the Nation" (1982, Step-Forward)
- "Stand Out" (1982, Step-Forward)
- "Valium Mother" (1985, Communiqué)
- "Shine the Light" (1986, Communiqué)
- "Give Me More" (1986, self-released)
- "We Dare" (1994, Weser)
- "Sod the War" (2007, TKO)
- ”Ca$h” (2021, Westworld)

=== Compilation appearances ===
- "Right to Work" on Jubilee (1978, Polydor)
