= Evacuation =

Evacuation or Evacuate may refer to:

- Casualty evacuation (CASEVAC), patient evacuation in combat situations
- Casualty movement, the procedure for moving a casualty from its initial location to an ambulance
- Emergency evacuation, removal of persons from a dangerous place due to a disaster or impending war
- Medical evacuation (MEDEVAC), evacuating a patient by plane or helicopter or even train
- The process of creating a vacuum

== Specific evacuations ==
- Evacuation of East Prussia, after World War II
- Evacuation of Finnish Karelia, during World War II
- Evacuations of civilians in Britain during World War II
- Evacuation of Spanish Florida (1763)
- List of World War II evacuations
- Evacuation of the northern Gaza Strip, during 2023 Israel-Hamas War

== Entertainment ==
- "Evacuation" (song), a song by Pearl Jam
- Evacuation (TV series), a children's show in the UK
- Evacuation (The Bill), an episode of British TV series The Bill
- Evacuate (band), a punk rock band from Southern California
- Evacuate (album), a 1982 album by Chelsea

== Other ==
- Defecation and/or urination, especially involuntarily after death
- Forced migration, a coerced and often violent movement of persons away from their home region
