= Jubilee (1978 film) =

1978 film directed by Derek Jarman

- Directed by: Derek Jarman
- Written by: Derek Jarman
- Produced by: Howard Malin; James Whaley
- Starring: Jenny Runacre; Jordan; Nell Campbell; Linda Spurrier; Toyah Willcox; Adam Ant; Wayne County
- Cinematography: Peter Middleton
- Edited by: Nick Barnard; Tom Priestley
- Music by: Chelsea; Suzi Pinns; Brian Eno; Siouxsie and the Banshees; Wayne County; Toyah Willcox; Adam Ant; Ludwig Minkus
- Distributed by: Cinegate Ltd.
- Release date: 3 February 1978
- Running time: 103 minutes
- Country: United Kingdom
- Language: English
- Budget: £50,000 or £200,000

Jubilee is a 1978 British drama film directed by Derek Jarman. It stars Jenny Runacre, Ian Charleson, Nell Campbell, Hermine Demoriane and a host of punk rockers. The title refers to the Silver Jubilee of Elizabeth II in 1977.

Numerous punk icons appear in the film including Adam Ant, Toyah, Jordan (a Malcolm McLaren protégé), Gene October and Jayne County. It features performances by Jayne County and Adam and the Ants. There are also cameo appearances by the Slits and Siouxsie and the Banshees. The film was scored by Brian Eno.

== Plot ==
Queen Elizabeth I is transported forward in time to the film's present day by the occultist John Dee, who commands the spirit guide Ariel (a character from William Shakespeare's The Tempest) to bring them there. Elizabeth arrives in the shattered Britain of the 1970s and moves through the social and physical decay of the city, observing the sporadic activities of a group of aimless nihilists – mostly young women, including Amyl Nitrate, Bod, Chaos, Crabs and Mad.

An early scene, set in a squat, introduces the audience to this group of characters and also to Sphinx and Angel, two incestuous bisexual brothers. Amyl Nitrate instructs a group of young women about history – in so doing, valorising the violent criminal activity of Myra Hindley – before reminiscing about her time as a ballet dancer. Bod, a sex-hating anarchist, has just strangled and killed Queen Elizabeth II, stealing her crown in an arbitrary street robbery.

From there, the group move on to a café, where Crabs picks up a young musician called Kid, Mad tears up some postcards, and Bod attacks a waitress with a bottle of tomato sauce. Bod contacts impresario Borgia Ginz. On meeting Ginz, however, she is surprised to find Amyl performing a pastiche of "Rule Britannia". Sphinx and Angel establish a relationship with Viv, a young former artist, whom they take to meet Max, an ex-soldier. In exchange for sexual favours, Crabs takes Kid to see Ginz, who auditions Kid's band and signs them up under the name "Scum". Sphinx and Angel try to talk Kid out of this claiming that Ginz will just reduce Kid and his music to a packaged commercial commodity, but he just laughs at their lecturing. Ginz is branching out into property management and has purchased "abandoned" properties such as Westminster Cathedral and Buckingham Palace, which are transformed into musical venues.

Meanwhile, Mad, Bod and Crabs asphyxiate Happy Days, one of Crabs's one-night stands, with red plastic sheeting, when he fails to fully satisfy Crabs in bed. They proceed to break into the flat of androgynous rock star Lounge Lizard, whom Bod throttles to death. A fight breaks out between Kid and a policeman, at a disco session in Westminster Cathedral. After the gang all watch Kid's TV debut together, Viv and the three males pay a visit to Max's bingo hall, where violent police activity causes the death of Sphinx, Angel and Kid. Revenge attacks on the two policemen responsible follow. One of them is castrated to death by Mad and Amyl while the other, who has just started an affair with Crabs, is blown up on his doorstep with a petrol bomb by Bod.

Finally, Ginz takes the four women off to Dorset – "the only safe place to live these days" – an unreconstructed right-wing aristocratic enclave, where he signs a recording contract with the gang. Interspersed with these displays of contemporary anarchic violence, Dee, Ariel, and Elizabeth try to interpret the signs of anarchic modernity around them, before they undertake a pastoral and nostalgic return to the sixteenth century at the film's end.

== Cast ==
- Jenny Runacre – Queen Elizabeth I/Bod
- Little Nell – Crabs
- Toyah Willcox – Mad
- Jordan – Amyl Nitrate
- Hermine Demoriane – Chaos
- Ian Charleson – Angel
- Karl Johnson – Sphinx
- Linda Spurrier – Viv
- Orlando – Borgia Ginz
- Jayne County – Lounge Lizard
- Richard O'Brien – John Dee
- Adam Ant – Kid
- Helen Wellington-Lloyd – Lady-in-waiting
- Claire Davenport – First Customs Lady
- Barney James – Policeman
- Lindsay Kemp – Cabaret performer
- Gene October – Happy Days
- David Haughton – Ariel
- Siouxsie Sioux – herself
- Steven Severin – himself
- The Slits - themselves

== Influences ==
The film is heavily influenced by the 1970s punk aesthetic in its style and presentation. Shot in grainy colour, it is largely plotless and episodic. Location filming took advantage of London neighbourhoods that were economically depressed and/or still contained large amounts of rubble from the London Blitz.

== Reception ==
Ralph McLean of The Irish News wrote "it's a heady brew of cold ultra-violence and future vision vitriol, offset by an uneven and occasionally amateurish way with storytelling." Film critic Derek Malcolm said that "Jubilee may not be a very good film; but the fact that it exists at all is a kind of justification in the present circumstances."

Lee Broughton of PopMatters opined that "it's little wonder that most punk spectators found little to relate to in the film, character-wise, at the time of its release; Jarman's film doesn't offer much in the way of a traditional narrative." In his review for Bright Lights Film Journal, Julian Upton observed "it is stark, blunt, and looks increasingly unsophisticated in its attempts to shock."

Film critic Adam Scovell commented "in spite of its pessimistic narrative streak; the film works as evidence of a previous London that sits in opposition to today's increasingly bland, unaffordable metropolis." David Pirie from Time Out said "several sequences stoop to juvenile theatrics, and the determined sexual inversion comes to look disconcertingly like a misogynist binge."

On review aggregator website Rotten Tomatoes, the film holds an approval rating of 100% based on 6 reviews, with an average rating of 6.3/10.

== Reaction ==
Fashion designer Vivienne Westwood manufactured a T-shirt on which was printed an "open letter" to Jarman denouncing the film and his misrepresentations of punk. According to biographer Tony Peake, Jarman was critical of punk's fascination with fascism, while mocking its stupidity and petty violence.

Jubilee is now considered a cult classic, and was released on DVD by the Criterion Collection in 2003 in the US and on Blu-ray by the BFI (British Film Institute) in 2018 in the UK.

== Adaptations ==
In November 2017, the film was adapted by Chris Goode as a play at Manchester Royal Exchange Theatre. Toyah Willcox, who played the role of Mad in the original film, performed the parts of Queen Elizabeth and Bod in this stage revival.
