= Harriet Stubbs =

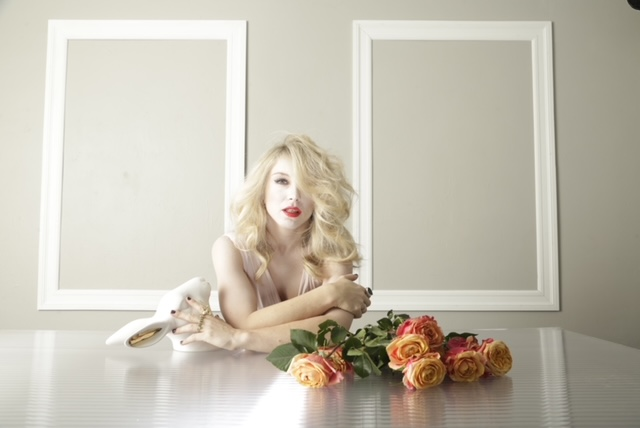

Background information
- Genres: Classical
- Occupation: Pianist
- Instrument: Piano
- Years active: 2011–present
- Website: www.harrietstubbs.com

Harriet Elizabeth Rose Stubbs BEM is a British classical concert pianist.

== Early years ==
Stubbs started playing at the age of three, performing publicly a year later. At the age of five she won a full scholarship from the Else & Leonard Cross Memorial Foundation to the Guildhall School of Music and Drama; the youngest ever to attend majoring in both cello and piano completing Grade 8 with distinction in both at the age of seven. Despite being a junior, Harriet studied with the late Professor Emeritus, Jimmy Gibb, Head of Department Ronan O Hora, and Joan Havill.

She was invited to play at the Blackheath International Piano Festival at the age of eight. Harriet studied at Trinity Laban for her undergraduate degree and Manhattan School Of Music for her master's degree.

== Career ==
Stubbs went on to perform all over the UK at Del a War Pavillion, Canterbury Theatre, Brighton Festival, Castle Howard, St Martin-in-the-Fields, St John’s Smith Square, St John’s Waterloo, Cheltenham Recital Series, The Reform Club, The Travellers Club, St James’s Piccadilly, The Georgian Theatre Royal and London City Lights Festival. Stubbs performed her first concerto as soloist with the orchestra with Lancing College Orchestra and then later with the Earnest Read Symphony Orchestra and the Worthing Philharmonic at the age of nine with her own composed cadenzas. At the age of thirteen Stubbs performed in Warner Bros Harry Potter And The Prisoner Of Azkaban before appearing on ITV’s Britain’s Brilliant Prodigies as top three instrumentalists and top pianist in the country.

Stubbs debuted her debut commercially released album Heaven and Hell: The Doors Of Perception produced by Russ Titelman and featuring Marianne Faithfull with Naxos USA.

Stubbs has been giving daily concerts in London’s W14 and is now given 200 consecutive concerts in 200 days, during the Covid 19 lockdown.

She was awarded the British Empire Medal (BEM) in the 2022 Birthday Honours for services to the community in West London during Covid-19.
