= Michael Aston =

British musician

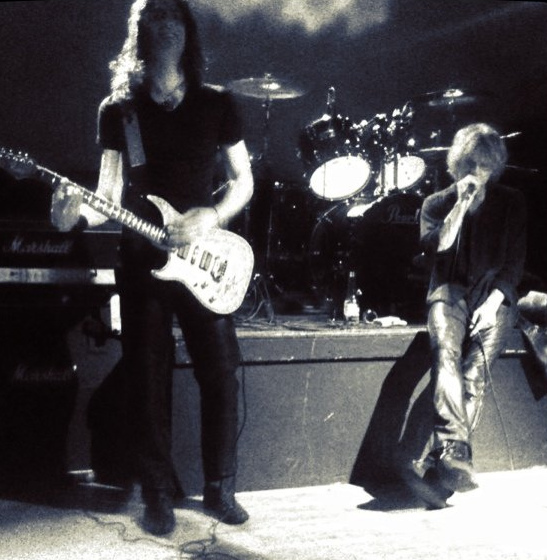
Michael Aston's Gene Loves Jezebel.

Michael Aston (born August 22, 1957) is a Welsh musician. He is the founder and current leader of Michael Aston's Gene Loves Jezebel (known as Gene Loves Jezebel in the US).

In 1989, Aston left Gene Loves Jezebel over his unhappiness with the direction of the band and strained relations with his twin brother, Jay. Moving to California, Aston started the Immigrants, which eventually became Edith Grove. Aston wrote and released his first solo album, called Why Me Why This Why Now?. He rejoined Gene Loves Jezebel instead of writing and recording a new Edith Grove album.

== Trademark dispute ==
On 15 February 2008, a lawsuit was filed by Michael Aston in California's Central District Court, against "Chris Bell, James Stevenson, Jay Aston, John Aston, Libertalia Entertainment and others" for trademark infringement. In a posting on their Myspace page on 25 September 2009, Jay Aston's Gene Loves Jezebel announced that an agreement had been reached with Michael Aston regarding the use of the name Gene Loves Jezebel: Jay Aston's band is now known as "Gene Loves Jezebel" in the UK and "Jay Aston's Gene Loves Jezebel" within the US; Michael Aston's band is now known as "Gene Loves Jezebel" in the US and "Michael Aston's Gene Loves Jezebel" in the UK. The settlement agreement was posted on Michael Aston's Gene Loves Jezebel website.
