= Gene October =

British singer and songwriter

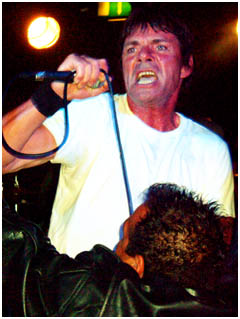
October with Chelsea in 2006

Gene October (born 19th June) is a British singer and songwriter who was a formative figure in London's punk rock movement in the late 1970s, fronting the band Chelsea.

== Music career ==
Prior to becoming involved in the punk movement, October had modelled clothing for designer Antony Price and appeared as a nude model for Jeffrey Magazine, an early British gay publication. He was employed at Acme Attractions, a clothing store on King's Road, Chelsea, London.

October is the singer/frontman of the original London band Chelsea, which formed in late 1976 after October placed an ad in the Melody Maker. Chelsea also featured Billy Idol on guitar and Tony James on bass. The band made their live debut on 18 October 1976 supporting Throbbing Gristle at London's Institute of Contemporary Arts.

The band's repertoire at this time consisted primarily of cover versions of 1960s songs by the Beatles and Rolling Stones, but they broke up after only a few weeks and a handful of live performances due to a clash of personalities. Idol, James, and drummer John Towe left October onstage during a live gig, eventually forming Generation X. In early 1977, October assembled a new line-up of Chelsea, which released numerous records and sustained many personnel changes.

Later, he briefly managed a club named Revolution No.9 and was employed as an A&R man for Miles Copeland III's I.R.S. Records. From the mid-1980s to the 1990s, he was a solo artist, releasing two singles and a 1995 album titled Life and Struggle. Since 1999, he has recorded and toured with Chelsea, including their 40th anniversary tour in 2016.

October also acted in two films produced and directed by Derek Jarman. In Jubilee, he played the character Happy Days, and in Caravaggio, he appeared as a fruit-eating model. He was also interviewed for the Billy Idol documentary Should Be Dead (2025), directed by Jonas Åkerlund.

== Solo artist discography ==
=== Albums ===
- Life and Struggle (Receiver Records, 1995)

=== Singles ===
- "Suffering in the Land" (Illegal Records, 1983)
- "Don't Quit" (Slipped Discs, 1984)
