= Illegal Records =

British record label

- Founded: 1977
- Founder: Miles Copeland III, Stewart Copeland, Paul Mulligan
- Defunct: 1988
- Status: Defunct
- Genre: Alternative rock, punk rock
- Country of origin: United Kingdom

Illegal Records was an independent record label, founded in 1977 by Miles Copeland III with his younger brother Stewart Copeland and the manager of The Police, Paul Mulligan. The label released The Police's debut single, "Fall Out".

Copeland went on to sign more artists and started several other indie sublabels including: Deptford Fun City Records, Step-Forward Records and Total Noise Records. He also launched the foreign divisions, France & Netherlands, that released some of the same titles with different catalogue numbers, and some exclusive titles as well.

In 1979, after Copeland started I.R.S. Records, Illegal became its distributor in UK and Europe. It continued its operations until 1988, when it merged its operations with I.R.S.

== Sub labels ==
- Deptford Fun City Records – Outlet for Deptford bands such as Alternative TV and Squeeze. Defunct since 1980.
- Step-Forward Records – Sub-label for bands such as Chelsea, The Fall and The Cortinas. Defunct since 1983.

== See also ==
- List of record labels: I–Q
