= List of Tilda Swinton performances =

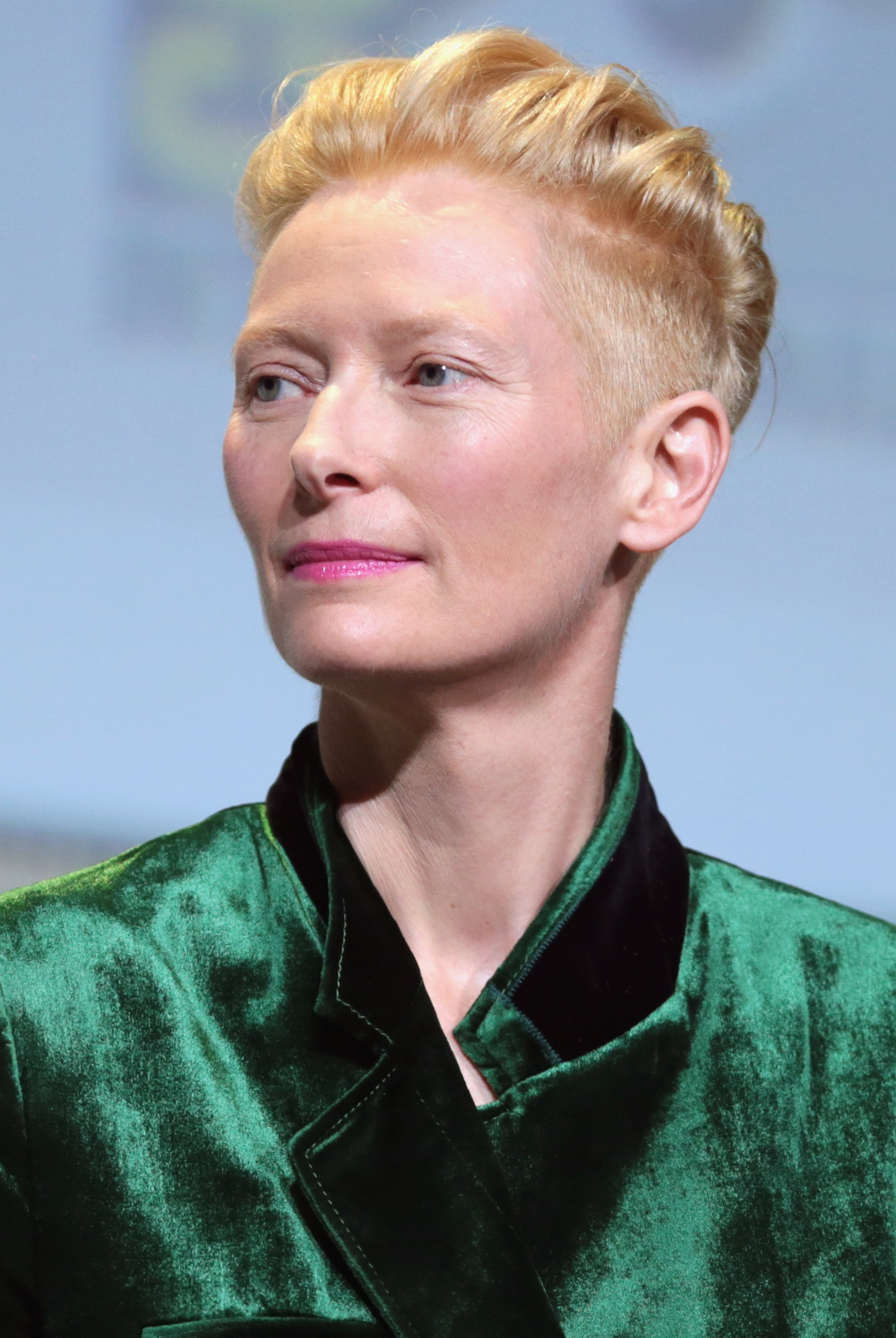
Swinton at the 2016 San Diego Comic-Con

Tilda Swinton is a Scottish actress known for her roles on stage and screen. She has appeared in numerous art house and blockbuster films, frequently collaborating with directors Joanna Hogg, Derek Jarman, Jim Jarmusch, Wes Anderson and Luca Guadagnino.

Swinton made her screen debut in Joanna Hogg's 1986 short film Caprice. She subsequently earned acclaim for her portrayals of Isabella of France in Derek Jarman's Edward II (1991), and an androgynous nobleman in Sally Potter's Orlando (1992). During this time she also took notable roles in the films such as the drama Friendship's Death (1987), experimental film Wittgenstein (1993), the erotic drama Female Perversions (1996), the British drama The War Zone (1999), the psychological drama Vanilla Sky (2001), the thriller The Deep End (2001), the adventure drama The Beach (2000), and the comedy-drama Adaptation (2002). Swinton received an Academy Award for Best Supporting Actress for her role in the film Michael Clayton (2007).

In blockbusters, Swinton has starred as the White Witch in the film adaptations of C. S. Lewis' The Chronicles of Narnia: The Lion, the Witch and the Wardrobe (2005), The Chronicles of Narnia: Prince Caspian (2008), and The Chronicles of Narnia: The Voyage of the Dawn Treader (2010) and appeared as the Ancient One in the Marvel Cinematic Universe films Doctor Strange (2016) and Avengers: Endgame (2019). Other notable film appearances include David Fincher's The Curious Case of Benjamin Button (2008), Lynne Ramsay's We Need to Talk About Kevin (2011), Jim Jarmusch's Only Lovers Left Alive (2013) and Bong Joon-ho's Snowpiercer (2013).

== Film ==
Year	Title	Role	Director	Notes
1986	Caravaggio	Lena	Derek Jarman	
1986	Egomania: Island Without Hope	Sally	Christoph Schlingensief	
1986	Caprice	Lucky	Joanna Hogg	Short film
1987	Aria	Young Girl	Derek Jarman	Segment: "Depuis le jour"
1987	Friendship's Death	Friendship	Peter Wollen	
1987	The Last of England	The Maid	Derek Jarman	
1988	Das andere Ende der Welt		Imogen Kimmel	
1988	Cycling the Frame	The Cyclist	Cynthia Beatt	Short film
1988	Degrees of Blindness		Cerith Wyn Evans	Short film
1988	L'Ispirazione		Derek Jarman	Short film
1989	Play Me Something	Hairdresser	Timothy Neat	
1989	War Requiem	Nurse	Derek Jarman	
1990	The Garden	Madonna	Derek Jarman	
1991	Edward II	Isabella	Derek Jarman	
1991	The Party – Nature Morte	Queenie	Cynthia Beatt	
1992	Man To Man	Ella/Max Gericke	John Maybury	
1992	Orlando	Orlando	Sally Potter	
1993	Blue	Narrator	Derek Jarman	Voice
1993	Wittgenstein	Lady Ottoline Morrell	Derek Jarman	
1994	Remembrance of Things Fast: True Stories Visual Lies	Performer	John Maybury	Experimental short
1996	Female Perversions	Eve Stephens	Susan Streitfeld	
1997	Conceiving Ada	Ada Byron King	Lynn Hershman Leeson	
1997	Herlizeares	Diera		Voice
1998	Love Is the Devil	Muriel Belcher	John Maybury	
1999	The Protagonists	Actress	Luca Guadagnino	
1999	The War Zone	Mum	Tim Roth	
2000	The Beach	Sal	Danny Boyle	
2000	Possible Worlds	Joyce	Robert Lepage	
2001	The Deep End	Margaret Hall	Scott McGehee & David Siegel	
2001	Vanilla Sky	Rebecca Dearborn	Cameron Crowe	
2002	Adaptation	Valerie Thomas	Spike Jonze	
2002	Teknolust	Rosetta / Ruby / Marinne / Olive	Lynn Hershman Leeson	
2003	The Statement	Annemarie Livi	Norman Jewison	
2003	Young Adam	Ella Gault	David Mackenzie	
2005	Absent Presence	Operator	Martin R. Davison & Hussein Chalayan	Short film
2005	Broken Flowers	Penny	Jim Jarmusch	
2005	Constantine	Gabriel	Francis Lawrence	
2005	Thumbsucker	Audrey Cobb	Mike Mills	Also co-executive producer
2005	The Chronicles of Narnia: The Lion, the Witch and the Wardrobe	White Witch	Andrew Adamson	
2006	Stephanie Daley	Lydie Crane	Hilary Brougher	Also executive producer
2007	Faceless	Narrator	Manu Luksch	Voice
2007	The Man from London	Camélia	Béla Tarr & Ágnes Hranitzky	
2007	Michael Clayton	Karen Crowder	Tony Gilroy	
2007	Sleepwalkers	Violinist	Doug Aitken	Short film
2007	Strange Culture	Hope Kurtz	Lynn Hershman Leeson	Documentary
2008	Burn After Reading	Katie Cox	Joel & Ethan Coen	
2008	The Chronicles of Narnia: Prince Caspian	White Witch	Andrew Adamson	Cameo
2008	The Curious Case of Benjamin Button	Elizabeth Abbott	David Fincher	
2008	Derek	Narrator (voice)	Isaac Julien	Documentary; also writer and executive producer
2008	Julia	Julia	Erick Zonca	
2009	I Am Love	Emma Recchi	Luca Guadagnino	Also producer
2009	The Limits of Control	Blonde	Jim Jarmusch	
2009	The Invisible Frame	The Cyclist	Cynthia Beatt	Short film
2010	The Chronicles of Narnia: The Voyage of the Dawn Treader	White Witch	Michael Apted	
2011	Genevieve Goes Boating	Narrator	Lucy Gray	Voice; Short film
2011	We Need to Talk About Kevin	Eva Khatchadourian	Lynne Ramsay	Also executive producer
2012	Moonrise Kingdom	Social Services	Wes Anderson	
2013	Only Lovers Left Alive	Eve	Jim Jarmusch	
2013	Snowpiercer	Minister Mason	Bong Joon-ho	
2013	The Zero Theorem	Dr Shrink-Rom	Terry Gilliam	
2014	The Grand Budapest Hotel	Madame D.	Wes Anderson	
2015	A Bigger Splash	Marianne	Luca Guadagnino	
2015	Trainwreck	Dianna	Judd Apatow	
2016	Doctor Strange	Ancient One	Scott Derrickson	
2016	Hail, Caesar!	Thora Thacker / Thessaly Thacker	Joel & Ethan Coen	
2016	The Seasons in Quincy: Four Portraits of John Berger	Herself	Bartek Dziadosz, Colin MacCabe, Christopher Roth, & Tilda Swinton	Documentary; also co-director, writer and executive producer
2017	Letters from Baghdad	Gertrude Bell	Sabine Krayenbühl & Zeva Oelbaum	Voice; Documentary; also executive producer
2017	Okja	Lucy Mirando / Nancy Mirando	Bong Joon-ho	Also co-producer
2017	War Machine	German Politician	David Michôd	
2018	Isle of Dogs	Oracle	Wes Anderson	Voice
2018	Suspiria	Madame Blanc / Dr. Josef Klemperer / Mother Helena Markos	Luca Guadagnino	Credited as Lutz Ebersdorf for second role
2019	Avengers: Endgame	Ancient One	Anthony Russo & Joe Russo	
2019	The Dead Don't Die	Zelda Winston	Jim Jarmusch	
2019	The Personal History of David Copperfield	Betsey Trotwood	Armando Iannucci	
2019	The Souvenir	Rosalind	Joanna Hogg	
2019	Uncut Gems	Anne "Adley's Auction Manager"	Safdie brothers	Voice; Cameo
2020	Last and First Men	Narrator	Jóhann Jóhannsson	Voice
2020	The Human Voice	Woman	Pedro Almodóvar	Short film
2021	The Souvenir Part II	Rosalind	Joanna Hogg	
2021	The French Dispatch	J.K.L. Berensen	Wes Anderson	
2021	Memoria	Jessica Holland	Apichatpong Weerasethakul	
2022	Three Thousand Years of Longing	Dr. Alithea Binnie	George Miller	
2022	The Eternal Daughter	Julie / Rosalind	Joanna Hogg	
2022	Guillermo del Toro's Pinocchio	Wood Sprite / Death	Guillermo del Toro & Mark Gustafson	Voices
2023	Problemista	Elizabeth	Julio Torres	
2023	Asteroid City	Dr. Hickenlooper	Wes Anderson	
2023	The Killer	The Expert	David Fincher	
2024	A Sudden Glimpse to Deeper Things	Narrator	Mark Cousins	Documentary
2024	The End	Mother	Joshua Oppenheimer	Also producer
2024	The Room Next Door	Martha / Michelle	Pedro Almodóvar	
2025	Ballad of a Small Player	Cynthia Blithe	Edward Berger	
2025	Broken English	The Overseer	Iain Forsyth and Jane Pollard	
2026	Wolf	Narrator	Christian Cargill	Also executive producer
2027	Jenjira's Magnificent Dream	TBA	Apichatpong Weerasethakul	Post-production

== Television ==
Year	Title	Role	Notes
1986	Zastrozzi, A Romance	Julia	4 episodes
1990	Your Cheatin' Heart	Cissie Crouch	6 episodes
1992	Screenplay	Ella / Max Gericke	Episode: "Man to Man"
1992	Shakespeare: The Animated Tales	Ophelia	Voice; Episode: "Hamlet"
1994	Visions of Heaven and Hell	Narrator	Voice; Television documentary
2005	The Somme	Narrator	Voice; Television documentary
2006	Galápagos	Narrator	Voice; 3 episodes
2012	Getting On	Elke	Episode 6 (season 3)
2013	When Björk Met Attenborough	Narrator	Voice; Television documentary
2019	What We Do in the Shadows	Tilda	Episode: "The Trial"
2021	What If...?	Ancient One	Voice; Episode: "What If... Doctor Strange Lost His Heart Instead of His Hands?"
2024	The Boys	Ambrosius	Voice; 3 episodes
2026	Rick and Morty	The Collective	Voice; Episode: "There's Something About Morty"

== Theatre ==
Year	Title	Role	Venue	Ref.
1982	Julius Caesar	Plebian	Royal Shakespeare Theatre, London	
1983–84	Measure for Measure	Juliet	Barbican Theater, London	
1984	Henry VIII	Lady in Waiting	Barbican Theater, London	
1984	The Devils	Sister Claire	Royal Shakespeare Company, London	
1984	Mother Courage and Her Children	Mother / Peasant Girl	Royal Shakespeare Company, London	
1985	Waste	Lucy Davenport	Royal Shakespeare Company, London	
1985	Torquato Tasso	Princess	National Theatre, London	
1989	The Long Way Round	Nova	National Theatre, London	
2005	Stand Bravely, Brothers!	Narrator	Royal Festival Hall, London	
2026	Man to Man	Performer	Royal Court Theatre, London	
2027	Man to Man	Performer	Lucille Lortel Theatre, Off-Broadway	

== Video games ==
Year	Title	Role
2005	Constantine	Gabriel (voice)

== Music videos ==
Year	Title	Artist	Director
1996	"The Box"	Orbital	Jes Benstock and Luke Losey
2013	"The Stars (Are Out Tonight)"	David Bowie	Floria Sigismondi
