= James Rannie Swinton =

Scottish portrait artist (1816–1888)

- Born: 11 April 1816; Berwickshire, Scotland
- Died: 18 December 1888 (aged 72); Kensington, London
- Known for: Portrait painting and drawing
- Spouse: Blanche Arthur Georgina FitzGerald-de Ros (married 1865)
- Parent(s): John Campbell Swinton of Kimmerghame, Berwickshire; Catherine Rannie
- Relatives: Archibald Campbell Swinton (brother); Alan Archibald Campbell-Swinton (nephew); George Swinton (nephew); John Swinton (great-grandnephew); Tilda Swinton (great-great-grandniece); Honor Swinton Byrne (great-great-great-grandniece)

James Rannie Swinton (11 April 1816 – 18 December 1888) was a nineteenth-century Scottish portrait artist.

== Early life and family ==
Arms of Clan Swinton

Born into Clan Swinton in Berwickshire on 11 April 1816, James Rannie Swinton was the younger son of John Campbell Swinton of Kimmerghame, Berwickshire, WS, and Catherine Rannie, his wife, and grandson of Archibald, fourth son of John Swinton of Swinton, Berwickshire.

His elder brother, Archibald Campbell Swinton, four years his senior, pursued a career in law and politics, but sisters, Catherine and Elizabeth, shared his interest in art.

== Education and early career ==
Like his brother, James was intended for the legal profession, but, having a strong taste for art, he was allowed in 1838 to adopt the profession of an artist. At Edinburgh Sir William Allan and Sir John Watson-Gordon gave him much encouragement, and in the latter's studio he was allowed to work. He studied at the Trustees' Academy in Edinburgh, and his first essays in portraiture were made in January 1839. In April of that year he went to London, where he was welcomed by Sir David Wilkie and (Sir) Francis Grant (1803–1878).

In 1840 he was admitted to the schools of the Royal Academy, and in the same year went to Italy, where he remained for about three years, also visiting Spain. At Rome he found many sitters, and laid the foundation of his subsequent popularity as a portrayer of the fashionable beauties of his day; among those who sat to him at Rome were the Countess Grosvenor, Lady Canning, the Countess of Dufferin, and Lady Charlotte Bury.

== Career and works ==
On his return to London he settled in Berners Street, and soon assumed the position of the most fashionable portrait-painter of the day. Nearly every fashionable beauty sat to him. His portraits were chiefly life-sized, boldly executed but graceful crayon drawings, although many of them were completed subsequently in oils, and frequently at full-length. A large portrait group of the three beautiful Sheridan Sisters, the Countess of Dufferin, the Hon. Mrs. Norton, and the Duchess of Somerset, which remained in the possession of the Marquis of Dufferin and Ava at least until 1885.

Swinton also drew and painted the portraits of eminent men with great success, among them being Louis Napoleon (afterwards Napoleon III), Lord Stratford de Redcliffe, the Duke of Argyll, Lord Canning, Bishop (afterwards Archbishop) Tait (painted in 1860), Lord Dufferin, and others, a full-length of Colonel Probyn (painted in 1867 and now in the National Army Museum) being considered especially successful.

Swinton exhibited for the first time at the Royal Academy in 1844, and his portraits were familiar objects there for thirty years. Swinton was dependent on the vagaries of fashion for his vogue as a portrait-painter, and his portraits quickly lost their repute, although they will always retain their value as historical memorials.

== Later life ==
In 1859 Swinton commissioned the construction of a lavish three-storey house in Warwick Square in Pimlico including a grand staircase with domed ceiling, ballroom and a huge conservatory with glass roof.

He married, on 23 July 1865, Blanche Arthur Georgina (1832–1910), youngest daughter of William FitzGerald-de Ros, 23rd Baron de Ros, but left no children.

Swinton died at his residence in Harrington Gardens, South Kensington, on 18 December 1888.

== Sources ==
- "Swinton, James Rannie" . Dictionary of National Biography. London: Smith, Elder & Co. 1885–1900.
