= Archibald Campbell Swinton =

Scottish author, politician and professor of civil law

- Born: Archibald Swinton; 15 July 1812; Broadmeadows, Berwickshire, Scotland
- Died: 27 November 1890 (aged 78); Kimmerghame, Berwickshire, Scotland
- Education: University of Glasgow, University of Edinburgh
- Occupations: Barrister, author, politician, professor of civil law
- Notable work: Men of the Merse, The Swintons of that Ilk and their Cadets
- Spouse: Katherine Margaret Pringle (married 1845-46) Georgina Caroline Sitwell (married 1856)
- Children: 2 daughters and 3 sons, including Alan Archibald Campbell-Swinton and George Swinton
- Parent(s): John Campbell Swinton of Kimmerghame, Berwickshire; Catherine Rannie
- Relatives: James Rannie Swinton (brother); John Swinton (great-grandson); Tilda Swinton (great-great-granddaughter); Honor Swinton Byrne (great-great-great-granddaughter)

Professor Archibald Campbell Swinton FRSE DL LLD LLB (15 July 1812 – 27 November 1890), was a Scottish author, politician and professor of civil law at Edinburgh University, 1842–62.

== Early life and family ==
Arms of Clan Swinton

Born into Clan Swinton in Broadmeadows, Berwickshire, on 15 July 1812, Archibald Campbell Swinton was the elder son of John Campbell Swinton of Kimmerghame, Berwickshire, WS, and Catherine Rannie, his wife, and grandson of Archibald, fourth son of John Swinton of Swinton, Berwickshire. Archibald's father succeeded his maternal aunt, Mary Campbell to the Kimmerghame estate, in 1850, adopting Campbell to the surname at this point. Archibald's younger brother, James Rannie Swinton, became a fashionable portrait artist, and sisters Catherine and Elizabeth, shared an interest in art. His father had law offices and a house at 9 Shandwick Place in Edinburgh's West End, just off Princes Street.

He was educated at the Edinburgh Academy, his classmates including Archibald Campbell Tait, later Archbishop of Canterbury.

Swinton studied law at the University of Glasgow and University of Edinburgh.

== Career and Later life ==
He passed the Scottish bar as an advocate in 1833, and acquired a large legal practice. He initiated an important reform in the system of reporting criminal trials. He lived and worked at 9 Gloucester Place in Edinburgh's Second New Town.

In 1844 he was elected a Fellow of the Royal Society of Edinburgh. His proposer was Thomas Charles Hope. He was then living at 9 Gloucester Place in Edinburgh.

In 1852 he was elected professor of civil law in Edinburgh University, his lectures being largely attended. He resigned the professorship in April 1862 and was replaced by James Muirhead. He succeeded to the Kimmerghame estate in 1867, and devoted himself to political work. He served on various royal commissions, and by his oratorical powers and legal knowledge won a foremost place as a layman in the General Assembly of the Church of Scotland.

He was an unsuccessful Conservative candidate for the parliamentary constituency of Haddington Burghs in 1852 and for Edinburgh and St Andrews in 1868.

He died on 27 November 1890, after five years of paralysis.

== Family ==
He married twice. Katherine Margaret Pringle, daughter of Sir John Pringle of Stitchell, Bt. from 1845 until her death in 1846. This marriage produced one daughter.

Swinton's second marriage was to Georgina Caroline Sitwell, daughter of Sir George Sitwell of Renishaw, Bt., from 1856. The couple had one daughter and three sons, including the electrical engineer A. A. Campbell-Swinton and Lord Lyon King of Arms George Swinton. Georgina survived him.

== Publications ==
- Men of the Merse (privately printed, Edinburgh, 1858, 8vo),
- The Swintons of that Ilk and their Cadets (Edinburgh, 1883, 8vo)

== Sources ==
- "Swinton, James Rannie" . Dictionary of National Biography. London: Smith, Elder & Co. 1885–1900.
