= George Swinton =

British politician

Captain George Swinton CBE DL

Lord Lyon King of Arms
- In office 1927–1929
- Monarchs: Edward VII; George V
- Preceded by: James Balfour Paul
- Succeeded by: Francis James Grant

Albany Herald
- In office 1923–1926
- Preceded by: William Rae Macdonald
- Succeeded by: Wolseley Haig

March Pursuivant
- In office 1901–1923
- Preceded by: William Brown of Balmangan
- Succeeded by: Wolseley Haig

Personal details
- Born: 10 May 1859 Edinburgh, Scotland
- Died: 17 January 1937 (aged 77)
- Parent(s): Archibald Campbell Swinton; Georgiana Caroline Sitwell
- Relatives: Alan Archibald Campbell-Swinton (brother); James Rannie Swinton (uncle); John Swinton (grandson); Tilda Swinton (great-granddaughter); Honor Swinton Byrne (great-great-granddaughter)

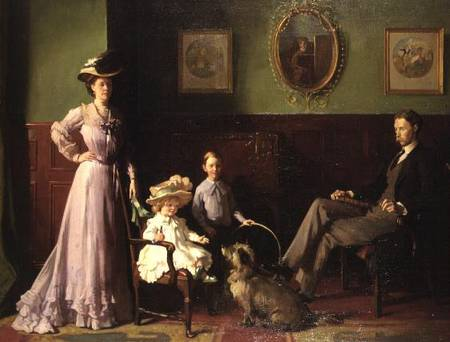
The family of George Swinton by William Orpen

The heraldic achievement of the Office of the Lord Lyon King of Arms.

Captain George Sitwell Campbell Swinton CBE DL (10 May 1859 – 17 January 1937) was a long-serving Scottish politician and officer of arms.

== Life and work ==
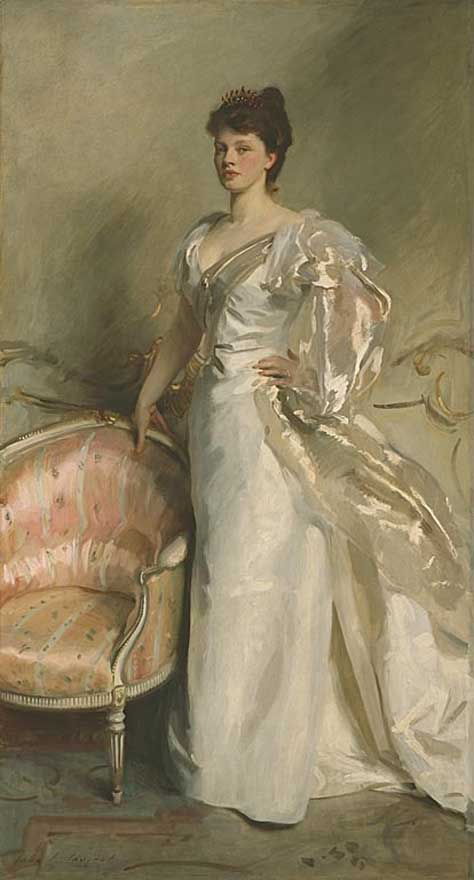
Mrs. George Swinton (née Elizabeth "'Elsie" Ebsworth), John Singer Sargent, 1897

Arms of Clan Swinton

Swinton was born at 7 Darnaway Street on the Moray Estate in west Edinburgh, the second son of advocate Archibald Campbell Swinton of Kimmerghame, Berwickshire, of Clan Swinton, and wife Georgiana Caroline Sitwell, daughter of Sir George Sitwell, 2nd Baronet of Renishaw. In 1895 he married Elizabeth "Elsie" Ebsworth OBE, daughter of E. H. Ebsworth of Gattonside. The couple had one son and two daughters. Elizabeth was an accomplished singer and performed professionally later in life.

He studied art under Professor Herkomer and other masters.

Swinton was appointed a sub-lieutenant in the Haddington, Berwick, Linlithgow and Peebles Artillery on 7 February 1877 (which commission he resigned on 11 May 1878), gazetted to the 71st (Highland) Regiment of Foot in May 1878, promoted to lieutenant on 23 January 1881, to captain on 11 September 1888, and retired in 1893. He was an extra aide-de-camp to the Marquess of Lansdowne when he was Viceroy of India from 1888 to 1894. In January 1900 he was appointed temporary staff captain at Army Headquarters.

Swinton was also the unsuccessful Conservative candidate for Paisley in 1900. He was a Member of London County Council representing Holborn from 1901 to 1907 and Dulwich from 1922 to 1928. He was chairman of the Parks and Open Spaces Committee in 1904–1905, and chief whip of the Municipal Reform Party (the Conservative group on the council) from 1903 to 1912. He was an Alderman from 1907 to 1912, and 1920 to 1922. He became chairman of the London County Council in 1912, but resigned on accepting the post of chairman of the Town-planning Committee of the new Imperial City of Delhi. He was attached by the Colonial Office to the Representatives of the Overseas Dominions attending the Imperial Conferences in 1917 and 1918; foreshadowed, in August 1917, the Scottish National War Memorial in Edinburgh Castle; honorary secretary of the Scottish National War Memorial Committee, 1918.

Swinton was appointed a deputy lieutenant for the County of London in 1926. He was appointed a Commander of the Order of the British Empire (CBE) in January 1928.

Swinton also served as March Pursuivant of Arms Extraordinary. He was Albany Herald of Arms in Ordinary from 1923 until 1926 and served Lord Lyon King of Arms and Secretary to the Order of the Thistle from 1927 until 1929.

Swinton is the grandfather of Major-General Sir John Swinton and great-grandfather of actress Tilda Swinton.

== Publications ==
A Garden Road; Development; London: Her Traffic, Her Improvement, and Charing Cross Bridge; several papers on social subjects, the problems of traffic, and the improvement of London.

== Arms ==
Coat of arms of Captain George Sitwell Campbell Swinton
Escutcheon Sable, on a chevron or a crescent gules, between three boars heads erased argent within a bordure engrailed ermine.

== See also ==
- Heraldry
- Court of the Lord Lyon
- Clan Swinton

== Notes ==
Political offices
Preceded by Sir Edward White	Chairman of the London County Council; 1912	Succeeded by Lord Cheylesmore
Heraldic offices
Preceded by William Brown of Balmangan	March Pursuivant; 1901-1923	Succeeded by Sir Thomas Wolseley Haig
Preceded by William Rae Macdonald	Albany Herald; 1923-1926	Succeeded by Sir Thomas Wolseley Haig
Preceded by Sir James Balfour Paul	Lord Lyon King of Arms; 1927–1929	Succeeded by Sir Francis James Grant
