= Alan Archibald Campbell-Swinton =

Scottish electrical engineer (1863-1930)

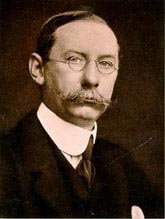
- Born: 18 October 1863; Albyn Place, Edinburgh, Scotland
- Died: 19 February 1930 (aged 66)
- Education: Fettes College, Edinburgh
- Occupation: Electrical engineer
- Known for: The first man to provide the theoretical basis for a completely electronic television system
- Parent(s): Archibald Campbell Swinton; Georgiana Caroline Sitwell
- Relatives: George Swinton (brother); James Rannie Swinton (uncle); John Swinton (grandnephew); Tilda Swinton (great-grandniece); Honor Swinton Byrne (great-great-grandniece)

Notes
- Elected a Fellow of the Royal Society in 1915

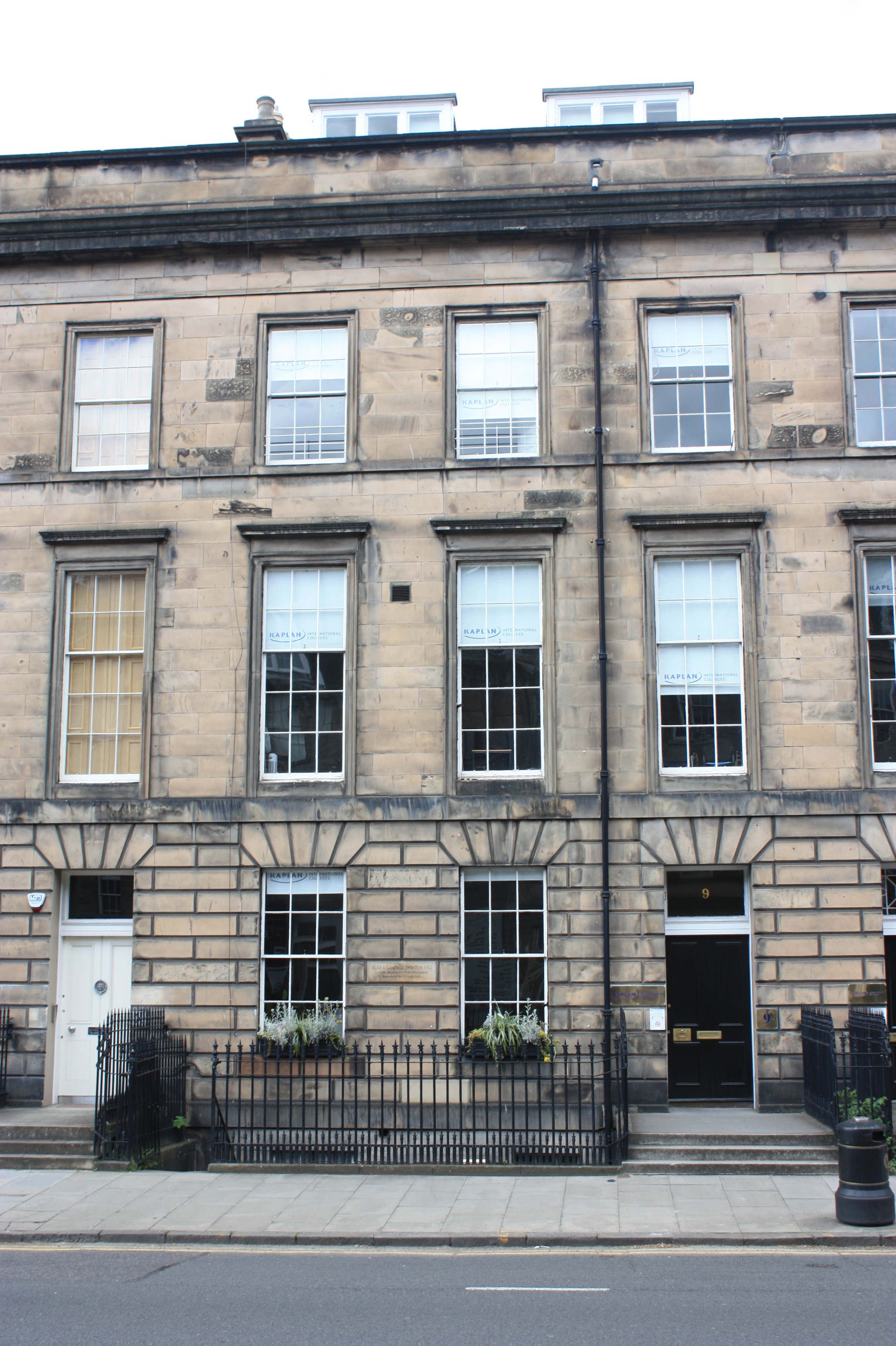
9 Albyn Place, Edinburgh, Campbell-Swinton's Edinburgh home has a plaque to his memory

Alan Archibald Campbell-Swinton FRS (18 October 1863 – 19 February 1930) was a Scottish consulting electrical engineer, who provided the theoretical basis for the electronic television, two decades before the technology existed to implement it. He began experimenting around 1903 with the use of cathode-ray tubes (CRTs) for the electronic transmission and reception of images. Campbell described the theoretical basis for an all electronic method of producing television in a 1908 letter to Nature. Campbell-Swinton's concept was central to the cathode ray television because of his proposed modification of the CRT that allowed its use as both a transmitter and receiver of light. The CRT was the system of electronic television that was subsequently developed in later years, as technology caught up with Campbell-Swinton's initial ideas. Other inventors would use Campbell-Swinton's ideas as a starting-point to realise the CRT television as the standard, workable form of all electronic television that it became for decades after his death. It is generally considered that the original credit for the successful theoretical conception of using a CRT device for imaging should belong to Campbell-Swinton.

== Life ==
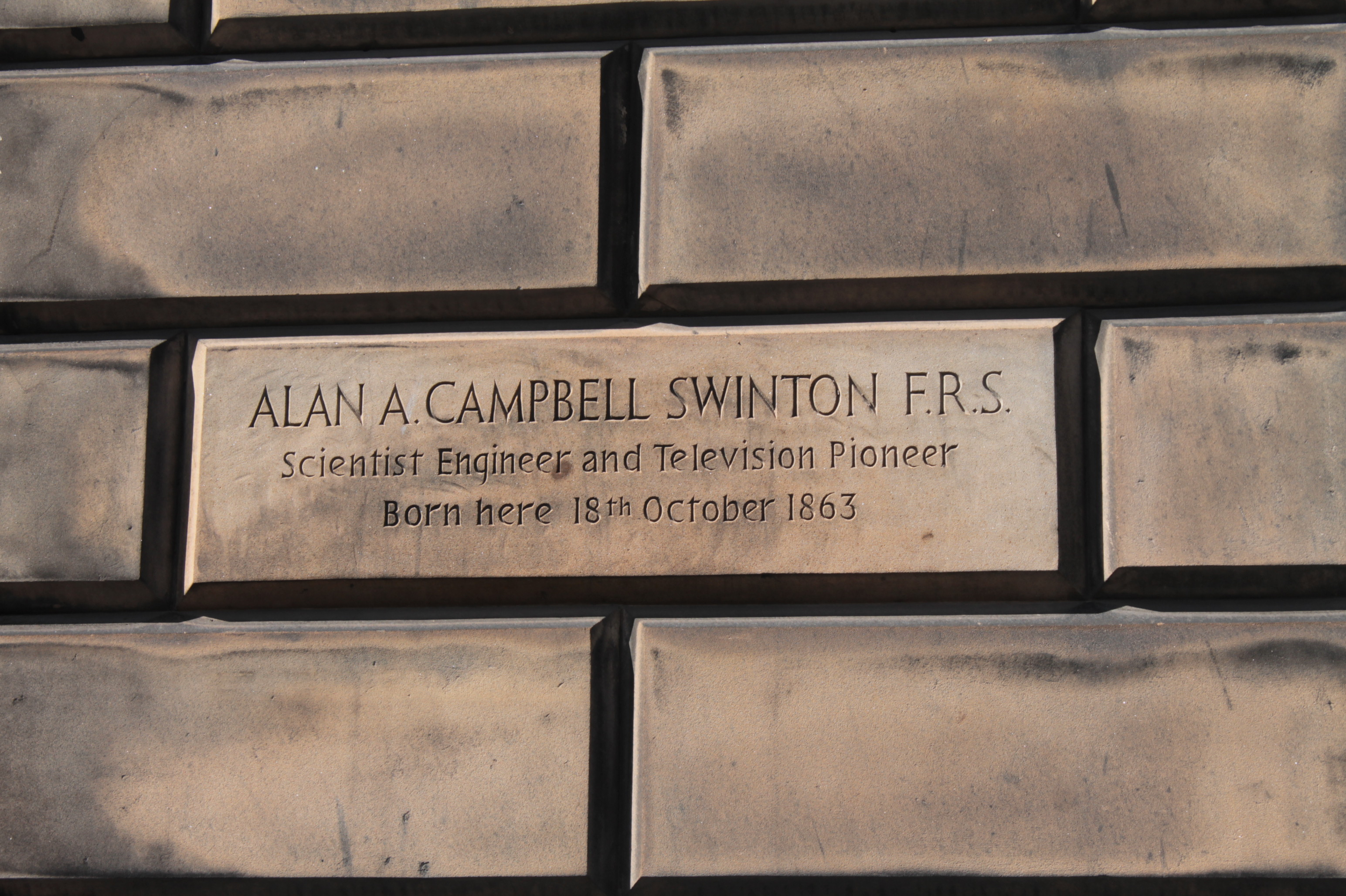
Memorial to Alan Campbell-Swinton, Albyn Place, Edinburgh

Arms of Clan Swinton

He was born in Edinburgh the son of advocate Archibald Campbell Swinton of Kimmerghame, Berwickshire, of Clan Swinton, and wife Georgiana Caroline Sitwell, daughter of Sir George Sitwell, 2nd Baronet of Renishaw. In 1895 he married Elizabeth "Elsie" Ebsworth OBE, daughter of E. H. Ebsworth of Gattonside. The couple had one son and two daughters. Elizabeth was an accomplished singer and performed professionally later in life.

Campbell-Swinton was educated at Cargilfield Trinity School and Fettes College (1878–1881).

He was one of the first to explore the medical applications of radiography, opening the first radiographic laboratory in the United Kingdom in 1896. He was elected a Fellow of the Royal Society in 1915. He is better known by his work on the electronic television. He discovered the phenomenon known as magnetic focusing in 1896, he found that a longitudinal magnetic field generated by an axial coil can focus an electron beam.

Campbell-Swinton wrote a letter in response to an article in the 4 June 1908 issue of Nature by Shelford Bidwell entitled "Telegraphic Photography and Electric Vision". Even as early as 1908, it was recognised that "The final, insurmountable problems with any form of mechanical scanning were the limited number of scans per second, which produced a flickering image, and the relatively large size of each hole in the disk, which resulted in poor resolution".

Campbell-Swinton's letter was published in the 18 June 1908 issue of Nature. The name of the article is "Distant Electric Vision". He wrote: "This part of the problem of obtaining distant electric vision can probably be solved by the employment of two beams of cathode rays (one at the transmitting and one at the receiving station) synchronously deflected by the varying fields of two electromagnets placed at right angles to one another and energised by two alternating electric currents of widely different frequencies, so that the moving extremities of the two beams are caused to sweep simultaneously over the whole of the required surface within the one-tenth of a second necessary to take advantage of visual persistence. Indeed, so far as the receiving apparatus is concerned, the moving cathode beam has only to be arranged to impinge on a suitably sensitive fluorescent screen, and given suitable variations in its intensity, to obtain the desired result."

He gave a speech in London in 1911 where he described in great detail how distant electric vision could be achieved. This was to be done by using cathode-ray tubes (CRTs) at both the transmitting and receiving ends. The photoelectric screen in the proposed transmitting device was a mosaic of isolated rubidium cubes. This was the first iteration of the electronic television which is still in use today. When Swinton gave his speech others had already been experimenting with the use of CRTs as a receiver, but the use of the technology as a transmitter was unheard of. His concept for a fully electronic television system was later popularised by Hugo Gernsback as the "Campbell-Swinton Electronic Scanning System" in the August 1915 issue of the popular magazine Electrical Experimenter.

In 1914 he once again described his system in his presidential address to the Roentgen Ray Society and in 1921 a book was published describing it in some detail. He himself described his system seven years later in the June 1928 issue of Modern Wireless, "Television by Cathode Rays".

"Surely it would be better policy if those who can afford the time and money would abandon mechanical devices and expend their labours in what appears likely to prove the ultimately more promising method in which the only moving parts are imponderable electrons."

In a letter to Nature published in October 1926, Campbell-Swinton also announced the results of some "not very successful experiments" he had conducted with G. M. Minchin and J. C. M. Stanton. They had attempted to generate an electrical signal by projecting an image onto a selenium-coated metal plate that was simultaneously scanned by a cathode ray beam. These experiments were conducted before March 1914, when Minchin died, but they were later repeated by two different teams in 1937, by his students H. Miller and J. W. Strange from EMI, and by H. Iams and A. Rose from RCA. Both teams succeeded in transmitting "very faint" images with the original Campbell-Swinton's selenium-coated plate, but much better images were obtained when the metal plate was covered with zinc sulphide or selenide, or with aluminium or zirconium oxide treated with caesium. These experiments are the base of the future vidicon.

Alongside his research into the electrical transmission of images, Campbell-Swinton also worked in voice telephony, founding the short-lived Equitable Telephone Association in the 1880s.

== See also ==
- Clan Swinton
