= Sir John Swinton, 15th of that Ilk =

Clan Swinton knight

Sir John Swinton, 15th of that Ilk was a son of Sir John Swinton, 14th of that Ilk and Princess Margaret, daughter of Robert, Duke of Albany who served as Regent (see Clan Swinton).

During the Hundred Years' War, he was a doughty warrior who fought and led the Clan Swinton at the Battle of Baugé against the English in France in 1421, where the French-Scottish forces were victorious. Although the credit for this is claimed by others, he is said to have been the knight who slew the Duke of Clarence, brother of King Henry V of England. The incident appears in his descendant Sir Walter Scott’s poem, "The Lay of the Last Minstrel":

- "And Swinton laid the lance in rest,
  That amed of yore the sparkling crest
  Of Clarence's Plantagenet".

However, Sir John Swinton was killed when the Clan Swinton fought at the Battle of Verneuil in France in 1424.

== See also ==
- Clan Swinton
