= March Pursuivant =

- The heraldic badge of March Pursuivant of Arms
- Heraldic tradition: Gallo-British
- Jurisdiction: Scotland
- Governing body: Court of the Lord Lyon

March Pursuivant of Arms is a Scottish pursuivant of arms of the Court of the Lord Lyon.

The office was first mentioned in 1515 and it is associated with the part of the Border area that was known as the Marches, i.e. the whole border area.

The badge of office is a demi lion rampant holding a rose Gules and gorged with a coronet of four fleur de lys (two visible) and four crosses pattée (one and two halves visible) Or.

The office is currently held by Philip Tibbetts, Esq. He took part in the Royal Procession at the 2023 Coronation.

== Holders of the office ==
Arms	Name	Date of appointment	Ref
	William Brown of Balmangan	1515	
	Sir George Sitwell Campbell-Swinton	1901–1923	
	Sir Thomas Wolseley Haig	1923–1927	
	Vacant	1927–2021	
	Philip Tibbetts	2021–Present (in Extraordinary)	

== See also ==
- Officer of Arms
- Pursuivant
- Court of the Lord Lyon
- Heraldry Society of Scotland
