= Sir John Swinton, 14th of that Ilk =

Scottish landowner and soldier (c.1350–1402)

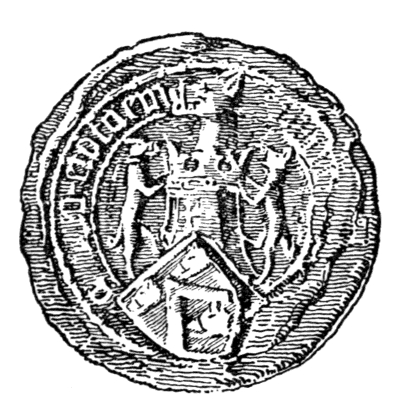
Seal of Sir John de Swinton, 1389

Sir John Swinton, 14th of that Ilk (c. 1350 - 1402), was a Scottish landowner and soldier. He served under John of Gaunt and later fought in the Otterburn campaign. He was the great-grandson of Henry de Swinton who appears on the Ragman Roll of 1296 was a distinguished soldier and statesman in the reigns of Robert II of Scotland and Robert III of Scotland. (See Clan Swinton)

== France, Hundred Years War ==
In the early 1370s, Swinton entered the service of John of Gaunt, 1st Duke of Lancaster and took part in campaigns in France. His agreements with Gaunt stipulated that he would not be required to fight against Scotland.

Swinston distinguished himself during the campaigns in France, particularly at Noyon (between Amiens and Paris). According to Jean Froissart, he crossed the barriers at Noyon and fought alone against a group of French knights for more than an hour, striking several of them with his lance. When the army began to move on, he cleared the way through the opposing forces and rejoined his companions.

Around this time, Swinton married a young woman, Joan, who died without children. Her jewels were reportedly taken by Alice Perrers, the influential mistress of Edward III. He appealed to the King for their return, but the jewels could not be recovered. He returned to Scotland shortly afterwards.

== Battle of Otterburn ==
He was a commander at the Battle of Otterburn in July 1388, where the Scots defeated the English, despite the death of their commander, the Earl of Douglas. The Scotichronicon, describes Swinton as a very experienced, strong, and brave Scot", and credits him with helping to break through the English line.

According to another account, during the wars with England Swinston entered the enemy camp and issued a general challenge to fight any member of the English army.

== Appointments ==
Swinton was appointed by King Robert III as one of the ambassadors extraordinary tasked with negotiating a treaty with England. On 4 July 1392, Richard II granted safe conduct to the ambassadors and sixty knights in their retinue. Swinton was later involved in another diplomatic mission and, on 7 July 1400, received safe conduct from King Henry IV to travel to England with a retinue of twenty horsemen.

== Battle of Homildon Hill ==
Swinton fought at the Battle of Homildon Hill on 14 September 1402, where the Scottish army suffered a major defeat against the English forces. According to an account recorded by John Pinkerton, the English archers inflicted heavy losses on the Scots from a distance. Swinton reportedly urged his countrymen to abandon their exposed position and engage the enemy in close combat.

Before the ensuing charge, Adam de Gordon, with whom Swinton had previously been involved in a feud, is said to have reconciled with him and asked Swinton to knight him. The two then descended the hill together to confront the English forces.

Swinton and Gordon then descended the hill accompanied by only about one hundred men. The group was overwhelmed, and Swinton and Gordon were killed in the fighting.

== Family life ==
Swinton's second wife was the Margaret, Countess of Mar, daughter of Donald, 8th Earl of Mar. She married Swinston before July 1388. Around 1392, Swinton married Margaret Stewart, daughter of Robert Stewart, Duke of Albany and Margaret Graham, Countess of Mentheith. They had a son, Sir John Swinton of Swinton, who succeeded his father and was later killed at the Battle of Verneuil in 1424.

== See also ==
- Clan Swinton
