= Genevieve Goes Boating =

- Directed by: Lucy Gray
- Starring: Tilda Swinton
- Release date: 2012
- Running time: 17 minutes
- Country: United States
- Language: English

Genevieve Goes Boating is a 2012 short film directed by Lucy Gray and narrated by Tilda Swinton. It is Gray's directorial debut.

== Cast ==
- Tilda Swinton as Narrator
