= The Souvenir Part II =

- Theatrical release poster
- Directed by: Joanna Hogg
- Written by: Joanna Hogg
- Produced by: Ed Guiney; Emma Norton; Andrew Lowe; Joanna Hogg; Luke Schiller
- Starring: Honor Swinton Byrne; Jaygann Ayeh; Richard Ayoade; Ariane Labed; James Spencer Ashworth; Tilda Swinton
- Cinematography: David Raedeker
- Edited by: Helle le Fevre
- Production companies: A24; BBC Film; BFI; Sikelia Productions; Protagonist Pictures; Element Pictures; JWH Films
- Distributed by: A24 (United States); Picturehouse Entertainment (United Kingdom and Ireland)
- Release dates: 8 July 2021 (Cannes); 29 October 2021 (United States); 4 February 2022 (United Kingdom and Ireland)
- Running time: 107 minutes
- Countries: United States; United Kingdom; Ireland
- Language: English
- Box office: $381,315

The Souvenir Part II is a 2021 drama film, written and directed by Joanna Hogg. It is a sequel to The Souvenir (2019). It stars Honor Swinton Byrne, Jaygann Ayeh, Richard Ayoade, James Spencer Ashworth, Harris Dickinson, Charlie Heaton, Joe Alwyn, and Tilda Swinton.

The film had its world premiere at the Cannes Film Festival on July 8, 2021. It was released in the United States on October 29, 2021, by A24, and was released in the United Kingdom on February 4, 2022, by Picturehouse Entertainment. The film received critical acclaim.

== Plot ==
Still reeling over the fatal overdose of her lover Anthony, Julie stays with her parents for a few days after his death, where she informs her mother that her period is late. She soon returns to her flat and to film school. She later visits Anthony's parents, James and Barbara, to return some of his belongings while also learning from them what kind of person Anthony was, though his parents disclose that they knew very little about their son.

While at a film studio where her friends Marland and Garance are working on their final student films, Julie meets Jim, one of the actors of Marland's film. They have sex that night, and Julie gets her period as Jim performs cunnilingus on her. She then visits Anthony's addict friends, including the one she found in her flat, to learn about his whereabouts in his final hours, though Suzie, one of the addicts, does not say.

Julie presents a new reel and script for her final student film to the school board, but they are harshly critical of it, citing the lack of clear narrative and improperly-formatted script. They inform her that they will not back her film if she continues on with it. She spends more time with her parents, during which she probes Rosalind for her thoughts about Anthony and information about the last time she saw him. Rosalind states that their last encounter was mostly uneventful, but pleasant. She also says she was fond of him and that she was deeply upset for Julie when she learned of his passing.

In secret from the school and using their studio and equipment, Julie decides to move forward with her film, which is a semi-autobiographical account of her relationship with Anthony. Garance convinces Julie to cast Pete, a young, talented stage actor, as "Alfie" while Julie requests Garance play "Julie". Julie's direction quickly becomes a point of consternation for the cast and crew, with Julie not properly communicating her ideas to the actors and having no consistent lighting plot. Pete tells Julie that he suspects that she's unable to reconcile the person that Anthony was with the person that Julie saw Anthony as.

While meeting with her editor, Max, he gleans more information about Anthony from her, where she discusses the relationship between her and Anthony's parents and how they've each grieved over him, and Max advises her not to shoulder the burden for their individual losses. Later, Julie receives a call from Barbara, who informs her that James was hospitalized from a stroke. Speaking with her therapist, she grapples with whether she actually loved Anthony or if she just craved companionship from someone outside her circle of friends and family, and the therapist tells her that she must live her life and continue finding that level of companionship.

Eventually, Julie premieres her film, entitled The Souvenir, to her class and the school board, during which she envisions a dreamlike sequence in which she metaphorically confronts Anthony's wrongs against her and receives help from her friends and family in letting him go.

Years later, in 1989, Julie is now a music video director, and celebrates her 30th birthday at her flat with friends from film school. The scene is then shown to be set inside the film school studio with a crew surrounding the set where the party is taking place. A voice calls, "Cut", as the film ends.

== Cast ==
- Honor Swinton Byrne as Julie
- Tilda Swinton as Rosalind
- Jaygann Ayeh as Marland
- Richard Ayoade as Patrick
- Ariane Labed as Garance
- Harris Dickinson as Pete
- Charlie Heaton as Jim
- Joe Alwyn as Max
- James Spencer Ashworth as William
- Gala Botero as Suzie
- Barbara Peirson as Barbara
- James Dodds as James
- Tosin Cole as Phil
- Tom Burke as Anthony (Uncredited)

== Production ==
In May 2017, it was announced Honor Swinton Byrne, Robert Pattinson, Tilda Swinton, Richard Ayoade and Ariane Labed had joined the cast of the film, with Joanna Hogg directing from a screenplay she wrote. Luke Schiller, Ed Guiney, Rose Garnett, Lizzie Francke, Emma Norton, Andrew Lowe, Martin Scorsese, and Emma Tillinger Koskoff would serve as producers on the film under their Element Pictures, BBC Films and Sikelia Productions banners, respectively.

In January 2019, A24 acquired distribution rights to the film. In June 2019, Pattinson dropped out of the film due to scheduling conflicts with The Batman. In August 2019, it was announced Charlie Heaton, Harris Dickinson and Joe Alwyn had joined the cast of the film. Heaton and Dickinson replaced Pattinson, whose character was reconceived as two separate characters.

Principal photography began on June 3, 2019. Filming wrapped in July 2019.

== Release ==
In March 2021, Picturehouse Entertainment acquired UK and Ireland distribution rights to the film. It had its world premiere at the Cannes Film Festival in the Directors Fortnight section on July 8, 2021. It was released in the United States on October 29, 2021. It was released in the United Kingdom on February 4, 2022.

=== Critical response ===
The film received widespread critical acclaim. On Rotten Tomatoes, the film has an approval rating of 90% based on 134 critical reviews, with an average rating of 8.3/10. The website's critical consensus reads, "Drawing on another terrific performance from Honor Swinton Byrne, The Souvenir Part II continues its story with profound emotional complexity and elegant storytelling." On Metacritic, the film holds a weighted average score of 90 based on 39 critic reviews, indicating "universal acclaim".

Peter Bradshaw of The Guardian described the film as an "amazingly luminous self-portrait of the film-maker as a young woman" and gave it the full five stars. The film received similar praise from Guy Lodge of Variety, who described Hogg's film as "a dazzling, fragile follow-up to her semi-autobiographical coming-of-age stunner from 2019".

In June 2025, IndieWire ranked the film at number 23 on its list of "The 100 Best Movies of the 2020s (So Far)."

=== Awards and nominations ===
Award	Date of ceremony	Category	Recipient(s)	Result	Ref.
Cannes Film Festival	July 16, 2021	Palm Dog Award	Rose, Dora, and Snowbear	Won	
Gotham Independent Film Awards	November 29, 2021	Best International Feature	The Souvenir Part II	Nominated	
British Independent Film Awards	December 5, 2021	Best British Independent Film	Joanna Hogg, Ed Guiney, Emma Norton, Andrew Lowe, Luke Schiller	Nominated	
British Independent Film Awards	December 5, 2021	Best Director	Joanna Hogg	Nominated	
British Independent Film Awards	December 5, 2021	Best Screenplay	Joanna Hogg	Nominated	
British Independent Film Awards	December 5, 2021	Best Supporting Actor	Richard Ayoade	Nominated	
British Independent Film Awards	December 5, 2021	Best Supporting Actress	Tilda Swinton	Nominated	
British Independent Film Awards	December 5, 2021	Best Costume Design	Grace Snell	Won	
British Independent Film Awards	December 5, 2021	Best Editing	Helle le Fevre	Won	
British Independent Film Awards	December 5, 2021	Best Make-Up & Hair Design	Siobhan Harper-Ryan	Nominated	
British Independent Film Awards	December 5, 2021	Best Production Design	Stéphane Collonge	Won	
