= The Souvenir =

2019 Film by Joanna Hogg

- Theatrical release poster
- Directed by: Joanna Hogg
- Written by: Joanna Hogg
- Produced by: Joanna Hogg; Luke Schiller
- Starring: Honor Swinton Byrne; Tom Burke; Tilda Swinton
- Cinematography: David Raedeker
- Edited by: Helle Le Fevre
- Production companies: JWH Films; BBC Films; BFI; Sikelia Productions; Protagonist Pictures
- Distributed by: A24 (United States and Canada); Curzon (United Kingdom and Ireland)
- Release dates: 27 January 2019 (Sundance); 17 May 2019 (United States); 30 August 2019 (United Kingdom)
- Running time: 119 minutes
- Countries: United Kingdom; United States
- Language: English
- Box office: $2 million

The Souvenir is a 2019 romantic drama film written, directed, and co-produced by Joanna Hogg. The film is a semi-autobiographical account of Hogg's experiences at film school. It stars Honor Swinton Byrne, Tom Burke, and Tilda Swinton. It follows a young, quietly ambitious film student who embarks on her first serious love affair with a charismatic and mysterious man.

The film had its world premiere at the Sundance Film Festival on 27 January 2019, where Hogg was awarded the World Cinema Grand Jury Prize: Dramatic. It was theatrically released in the United States on 17 May 2019, by A24, and in the United Kingdom and Ireland on 30 August 2019, by Curzon. It grossed over $2 million worldwide and received generally positive reviews from critics. It was named one of the top 10 independent films of 2019 by the National Board of Review and was nominated for Best International Film at the 35th Independent Spirit Awards. The film earned eight nominations, including Best British Independent Film, Best Director, Best Screenplay, Best Actor (for Burke), and Most Promising Newcomer (for Swinton Byrne), at the 22nd British Independent Film Awards. A sequel, The Souvenir Part II, was released in 2021.

== Plot ==
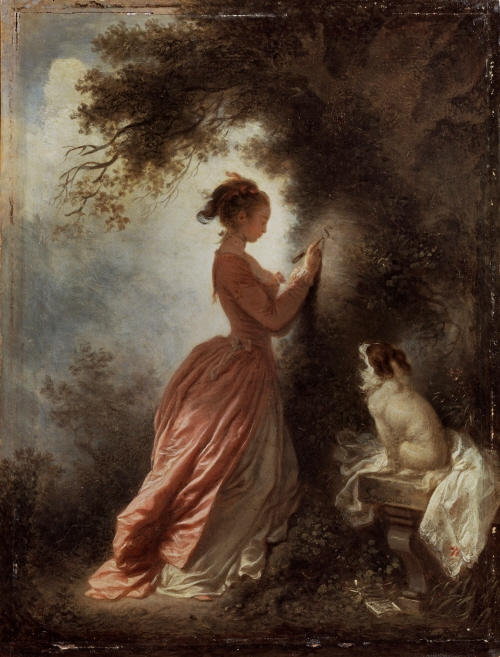
Fragonard's The Souvenir

In 1984, Julie, a film student, intends to make a film about a boy, his mother, and their life in the city of Sunderland. She lives in a Knightsbridge flat with another student and his girlfriend. She meets Anthony, a well-to-do man who works at the Foreign Office, who moves in with her after her flatmate moves out. Anthony leaves a postcard with a picture of the girl in the painting called The Souvenir by Jean-Honoré Fragonard. He later takes her to the gallery where the painting is hung. Julie says the girl looks sad, while Anthony says she looks determined.

Anthony travels to Paris and returns with some lingerie, which he asks Julie to put on. While in bed, she notices some needle marks on his arm but doesn't ask about them. Anthony frequently asks Julie for money, and she starts having to pay their restaurant bills and has to borrow from her parents.

Julie and Anthony have dinner with two of Anthony's friends, who reveal to Julie when he has left the room that Anthony is a heroin addict. Julie is taken aback but does not mention it to Anthony.

Anthony explains over a meal at Harrods that he has had relationships with three other girls, including trips to Venice with at least one of them, who appears to have committed suicide while on the trip. He invites Julie to go to Venice with him.

One evening, she returns to find that her flat has been broken into, and her valuable jewellery is missing. Later, after their trip to Venice, Anthony admits to doing it but says he didn't tell her to keep her from feeling bad. Julie becomes upset, but Anthony manages to convince her he had a good reason for doing so, even though he doesn't elaborate, insinuating it is related to work and not to his heroin habit. Julie starts noticing when Anthony is on heroin, and she attends a self-help group. She starts to confront him sometimes but doubts herself, and he manipulates and gaslights her. She begins to take on the responsibility of his addiction.

Julie returns home one evening to find a strange man in her apartment that Anthony must have let in. She also catches an illness from what she's being exposed to through Anthony. Finally, after finding out he was arrested, Julie asks Anthony to move out.

Julie begins to put herself back together after the breakup and progresses in her film work, to the happiness of her friends and professors. Anthony's mother calls Julie frequently in an attempt to find him.

Anthony shows up again and appears clean long enough for Julie to invite him back in with her. He goes through withdrawal in front of her but eventually starts using heroin again. Then he goes missing and is later found dead, having overdosed in a public toilet at the Wallace Collection - the gallery in which The Souvenir is hung.

== Cast ==
- Honor Swinton Byrne as Julie
- Tom Burke as Anthony
- Tilda Swinton as Rosalind
- Richard Ayoade as Patrick
- Jaygann Ayeh as Marland
- Jack McMullen as Jack
- Hannah Ashby Ward as Tracey
- Frankie Wilson as Frankie
- Barbara Peirson as Anthony's Mother
- James Dodds as Anthony's Father
- Ariane Labed as Garance
- Tosin Cole as Phil
- Tamsin Dean as NA Member (Uncredited)

== Release ==
The film had its world premiere at the Sundance Film Festival on January 27, 2019. A24 and Curzon Artificial Eye acquired U.S. and U.K. distribution rights to the film, respectively. Focus Features acquired distribution rights for the world excluding North America, the United Kingdom and Taiwan. It was released in the United States on 17 May 2019 by A24, and in the United Kingdom on 30 August 2019. It was released on VOD by Lionsgate Home Entertainment on 30 July 2019.

== Reception ==
=== Box office ===
The Souvenir made $85,851 from four theaters in its opening weekend, an average of $21,463 per venue. The film ultimately grossed $1 million in the United States and Canada, and $1 million in other territories, for a worldwide total of $2 million.

=== Critical response ===
On the review aggregator website Rotten Tomatoes, 90% of 184 critics' reviews are positive, with an average rating of 8.0/10. The website's consensus reads: "Made by a filmmaker in command of her craft and a star perfectly matched with the material, The Souvenir is a uniquely impactful coming of age drama." Metacritic, which uses a weighted average, assigned the film a score of 92 out of 100, based on 45 critics, indicating "universal acclaim".

Peter Bradshaw of The Guardian gave the film 5 out of 5 stars and remarked, "The Souvenir is an artefact in the highest auteur register. Its absence of tonal readability is a challenge. But there is also a cerebrally fierce, slow-burn passion in its austere, unemphasised plainness."

Mark Kermode of The Observer gave the film 4 out of 5 stars and stated, "Hogg turns the blade on herself, performing what seems at times to be a delicate act of on-screen auto-vivisection. It's powerful stuff: wryly tender, frequently funny, but insidiously suffocating. More than once I found myself stifling a scream – and I mean that as a compliment." Kermode highlighted, "Particular plaudits are due to Tom Burke, who gives a career-best performance."

Justin Chang of the Los Angeles Times opined, "If The Souvenir seems to move assuredly to its own unconventional rhythms, it's because Hogg isn't telling a straightforward story; she's showing us, piecemeal, how an artist's sensibility comes into being."

A. O. Scott of The New York Times called it "one of my favorite movies of the year so far" and wrote, "The Souvenir feels like a whispered confidence, an intimate disclosure that shouldn't be betrayed because it isn't really yours." Scott also noted, "This is one of the saddest movies you can imagine, and it's an absolute joy to watch."

Michael O'Sullivan of The Washington Post gave the film 3.5 out of 4 stars and commented, "Hogg's coming-of-age tale is no misty remembrance of bygone days. Rather, it is a clear-eyed reflection on how hindsight — and true art — is always 20/20."

David Rooney of The Hollywood Reporter described the film as "an illuminating (self-)portrait of a young artist as well as a mesmerizing chronicle of a consuming, destructive relationship that steadily inches its way under the viewer's skin."

Guy Lodge of Variety stated, "Hogg takes a little of both positions in her rich, exquisitely reflective fourth feature — a work of memoir shattered and reassembled into a universally moving, truthful fiction." Lodge praised Burke and Swinton Byrne for their "intensely interlocked performances."

Tomris Laffly of TheWrap wrote, "The Souvenir isn't exactly autobiographical, but it shares a DNA with the filmmaker's own past as a film student. It is a precise yet dreamy memory piece, in an opposite but equally masterful manner to Alfonso Cuarón's Roma, also a cinematic reenactment of recollections. […] The Souvenir — with its soft pastels, grainy textures and cloudy aftertaste — feels like getting liquefied within them."

In July 2025, it ranked number 68 on Rolling Stone's list of "The 100 Best Movies of the 21st Century."

=== Accolades ===
Award	Date of ceremony	Category	Recipient(s)	Result	Ref.
Sundance Film Festival	February 2, 2019	World Cinema Dramatic Grand Jury Prize	Joanna Hogg	Won	
British Independent Film Awards	December 1, 2019	Best British Independent Film	Joanna Hogg and Luke Schiller	Nominated	
British Independent Film Awards	December 1, 2019	Best Director	Joanna Hogg	Nominated	
British Independent Film Awards	December 1, 2019	Best Screenplay	Joanna Hogg	Nominated	
British Independent Film Awards	December 1, 2019	Best Actor	Tom Burke	Nominated	
British Independent Film Awards	December 1, 2019	Most Promising Newcomer	Honor Swinton Byrne	Nominated	
British Independent Film Awards	December 1, 2019	Best Costume Design	Grace Snell	Nominated	
British Independent Film Awards	December 1, 2019	Best Editing	Helle Le Fevre	Nominated	
British Independent Film Awards	December 1, 2019	Best Production Design	Stéphane Collonge	Nominated	
National Board of Review	January 8, 2020	Top Ten Independent Films	The Souvenir	Won	
London Film Critics' Circle Awards	January 30, 2020	Film of the Year	The Souvenir	Nominated	
London Film Critics' Circle Awards	January 30, 2020	Screenwriter of the Year	Joanna Hogg	Nominated	
London Film Critics' Circle Awards	January 30, 2020	Actor of the Year	Tom Burke	Nominated	
London Film Critics' Circle Awards	January 30, 2020	British or Irish Actor of the Year	Tom Burke	Nominated	
London Film Critics' Circle Awards	January 30, 2020	Supporting Actress of the Year	Tilda Swinton	Nominated	
London Film Critics' Circle Awards	January 30, 2020	The Attenborough Award for the Best British or Irish Film of the Year	The Souvenir	Won	
London Film Critics' Circle Awards	January 30, 2020	Young British or Irish Performer of the Year	Honor Swinton Byrne	Won	
Independent Spirit Awards	February 8, 2020	Best International Film	Joanna Hogg and Luke Schiller	Nominated	

== Sequel ==
In May 2019, it was announced a sequel would be produced with Swinton Byrne, Swinton, Ayoade and Labed reprising their roles, with Robert Pattinson joining the cast, although he later dropped out and was later replaced with Charlie Heaton and Harris Dickinson. A24 will distribute. Principal photography began in June 2018.
