= Albany Herald =

Scottish herald of arms of the Court of the Lord Lyon

- The heraldic badge of Albany Herald of Arms
- Heraldic tradition: Gallo-British
- Jurisdiction: Scotland
- Governing body: Court of the Lord Lyon

Albany Herald of Arms is a Scottish herald of arms of the Court of the Lord Lyon.

The office was first mentioned in a diplomatic mission from Scotland to England in 1401. The office was probably instituted on the creation of Robert Stewart, son of King Robert II, as Duke of Albany, on 28 April 1398. Albany is an old name for the part of Scotland north of the River Forth, and is cognate with "Alba", the Scottish Gaelic for Scotland.

The badge of office is A saltire Argent enfiled of a coronet of four fleurs-de-lys (one and two halves visible) Or ensigned of the Crown of Scotland Proper.

The office is currently held by Sir Crispin Agnew of Lochnaw.

== Holders of the office ==
Arms	Name	Date of appointment	Ref
	William Bailly	1452	
	William Brown of Balmangan	1516	
	William Brown	1546	
	John Balfour	1558	
	Alexander Oliphant.	1563	
	Thomas Oliphant	1604	
	George Kirkwood	1610	
	Robert Winram	1613	
	Gideon Weir	1637	
	James Lockhart	1661	
	George Ogilvie	1677	
	James Barr	1694	
	Robert Leslie	1723	
	Sir John Erskine of Cambo, Baronet	1726	
	Humphrey Harrison	1754	
	John Man	1766	
	John Douglas	1768	
	James Mitchell	1795	
	John Young	1827	
	David Littlejohn	1837	
	James Sinclair	1859	
	Vacant	1878–83	
	John Spence	1883	
	Robert Spence Livingstone	1885	
	William Rae Macdonald	1909	
	Sir George Sitwell Campbell-Swinton	1923–1926	
	Sir Thomas Wolseley Haig	1927–1935	
	Thomas Innes of Learney	1935–1945	
	Sir Francis James Grant	1945–1953	
	Major Charles Ian Fraser of Reelig	1953–1961	
	Sir Iain Moncreiffe of that Ilk, Baronet	1961–1985	
	John Alexander Spens	1985–2011	
	Vacant	2011–2021	
	Sir Crispin Agnew of Lochnaw, Bt., LVO	2021–Present (in Extraordinary)	

== See also ==
- Officer of Arms
- Herald
- Court of the Lord Lyon
- Heraldry Society of Scotland
