= Sandro Kopp =

German–New Zealand visual artist (born 1978)

- Born: 1978 (age 47–48); Heidelberg, Baden-Württemberg, Germany
- Occupation: Artist
- Partner: Tilda Swinton (2004–present)
- Website: sandrokopp.com

Sandro Kopp (born 1978) is a German–New Zealand visual artist based in Scotland. His work explores the intersection of classical painting and digital technology.

== Biography ==
Kopp grew up in Germany and obtained his Abitur with main subjects in fine art (researching and painting facial features) and English in 1998. In 2000, he immigrated to New Zealand, his mother's home country, where he lived and studied in Wellington.

Since 2006, Kopp has been based in Nairn in the Highland region of Scotland. He primarily works on oil portraits of family and friends painted from Skype conversations.

== Personal life ==
Kopp has been in a relationship with actress Tilda Swinton since 2004.

== Exhibitions ==
Kopp's work has been exhibited internationally. A list of some recent exhibitions include:

- December 2015, FEEDBACKLOOP, FIVE ELEVEN, New York
- December 2014, Sono Qui, Otto Zoo, Milan
- May 2014, Analogue, Galerie Antoine Laurentin, Paris
- June 2013, Cinematic Visions, Victoria Miro Gallery, London
- October 2013, Fiercely Loved, Timothy Everest, London
- October 2012, Mediated Presence, 6 Fitzroy Square, London
- January 2012, There You Are., Lehmann Maupin, New York
- November 2011, Krauts Projects: INSIGHTS II, Kunst/Halle, Heidelberg, Germany
- May 2011, Being with You, IST festival, Istanbul, Turkey
- December 2010, Krauts Projects: INSIGHTS, Kunst/Halle, Heidelberg, Germany
- November 2010, Artist Residency, TSKW, Florida
- October 2010, Not a Still Frame, Brachfeld Gallery, Paris
- March 2009, Krauts Projects: Go Figure, Frankfurt, Germany
- May 2008, PRESENT., HP Garcia Gallery, New York
- April 2008, Krauts Projects: Creative Clash, Mannheim Castle, Germany
- March 2008, Scottish National Portrait Gallery, Edinburgh, BP Awards
- November 2007, Junge Kunst 69, Heidelberger Kunstverein, Germany
- June 2007, National Portrait Gallery, London, BP Awards
