= William Rae Macdonald =

Arms of William Rae Macdonald

William Rae Macdonald (1843 – 1923) was a Scottish officer of arms.

Between 1898 and 1907, Macdonald was Carrick Pursuivant of the Court of the Lord Lyon. In 1909 he was appointed Albany Herald.

He was an actuary, antiquarian and mathematician, and contributed articles to the Dictionary of National Biography.

Heraldic offices
Preceded by Robert Spence Livingstone	Albany Herald; 1909	Succeeded by George Swinton
Preceded by Sir Francis James Grant	Carrick Pursuivant; 1898-1907	Succeeded by Sir Duncan Campbell, Bt
