= Philip Tibbetts =

British officer of arms and vexillologist

Philip Tibbetts FSA Scot
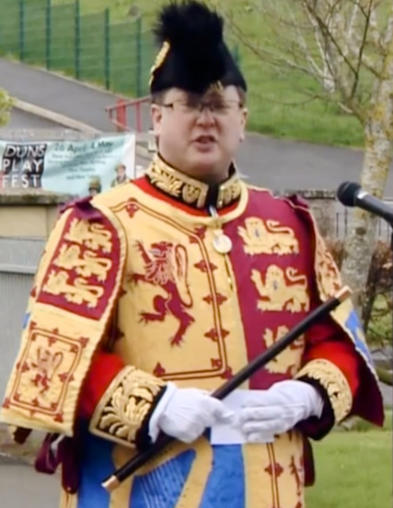

March Pursuivant
- Incumbent
- Assumed office 1 September 2021
- Monarchs: Elizabeth II; Charles III
- Preceded by: Sir Thomas Wolseley Haig

Honorary Vexillologist to the Court of the Lord Lyon
- Incumbent
- Assumed office 1 August 2018
- Preceded by: New Creation

Personal details
- Education: King Edward VI College
- Alma mater: University of St Andrews

Philip Tibbetts is a British officer of arms and vexillologist who currently serves as the March Pursuivant of Arms Extraordinary at the Court of the Lord Lyon in Scotland. He was appointed to the office on 1 September 2021, and is also the first person to hold the position of Honorary Vexillologist to the Court of the Lord Lyon.

== Background ==
Tibbetts grew up in Halesowen, attending the Earls High School and King Edward VI College, before reading philosophy at the University of St Andrews and Aarhus University. His day job is in the aerospace industry. After university Tibbetts also started working with communities to help them develop their own symbolism, initially starting with tartan. Tibbetts had a design for the Black Country officially recorded with the Scottish Register of Tartans, with a later variation also being adopted for the city of Bern's pipe band.

== Heraldic career ==
As a result of this community identity work Tibbetts became involved with the UK Flag Institute, where he was appointed as the institute's Communities Vexillologist and became responsible for handling community flag registrations. He co-authored the Flag Institute and North American Vexillological Association joint guide on vexillographic best practice.

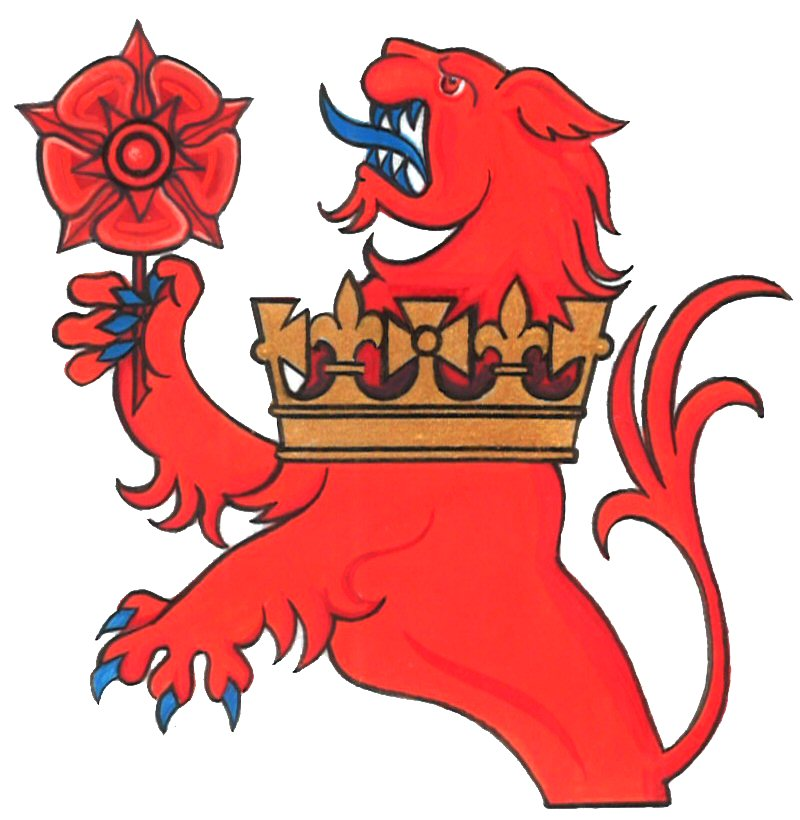
Badge of the Office of HM March Pursuivant Extraordinary

After he worked with Court of the Lord Lyon in Scotland, the Lord Lyon King of Arms created the role of Honorary Vexillologist for him.

Tibbetts primarily facilitates public competitions, such as for the Flag of Aberdeenshire, Flag of Banffshire, Flag of Berwickshire, Flag of Caithness (the first such competition in Scotland), Flag of East Lothian, Flag of Moray, Flag of Sutherland, Flag of Tiree, Flag of Skye and Flag of Maryhill. However, Tibbetts has been asked to directly design some community flags including those for Kirkcudbrightshire, the Cinque Ports, Preston, Nenthead, St Anne's on Sea and Appleby-in-Westmorland.

In 2021 Tibbetts was appointed as March Pursuivant at the Court of the Lord Lyon, the office having been seen as appropriate given his residence in the Scottish Marches of the Southern Uplands, and was the first to hold the office in nearly a century. Whilst continuing his vexillological duties, as a member of the Royal Household of Scotland he now also participates in state ceremonial duties. In this capacity Tibbetts was on duty for the funeral of Queen Elizabeth II and the coronation of King Charles III.

== Honours and decorations ==
- 2023: King Charles III Coronation Medal

== Arms ==
Coat of arms of Philip Tibbetts
Notes Recorded in Volume 93 folio 94 2020 of The Public Register of All Arms and Bearings in Scotland Crest A demi-phoenix rising displayed Or enflamed Gules, holding in its beak a flag. Escutcheon Sable, a chain in two gorges conjoined in the centre Argent. Motto Mettle and Fire.

Heraldic offices
Preceded by New Creation	Honorary Vexillologist to the Court of the Lord Lyon; 2018 – present	Incumbent
Preceded by Sir Thomas Wolseley Haig	March Pursuivant; 2021 – present	Incumbent
