= John Swinton of Kimmerghame =

British Army officer (1925–2018)

Major-General Sir John Swinton of Kimmerghame KCVO OBE DL
- Born: 21 April 1925
- Died: 4 October 2018 (aged 93)
- Spouse: Judith Balfour Killen (m. 1954; died 2012)
- Relatives: Archibald Campbell Swinton (great-grandfather); James Rannie Swinton (great-granduncle); George Swinton (grandfather); Alan Archibald Campbell-Swinton (granduncle); Tilda Swinton (daughter); Honor Swinton Byrne (granddaughter)
- Military career
- Allegiance: United Kingdom
- Branch: British Army
- Service years: 1944–1979
- Rank: Major-General
- Commands: London District; Household Division
- Conflicts: Second World War; Indonesia–Malaysia confrontation
- Awards: Knight Commander of the Royal Victorian Order; Officer of the Order of the British Empire; Mentioned in Despatches

Major-General Sir John Swinton of Kimmerghame, KCVO, OBE, DL (21 April 1925 – 4 October 2018) was a British Army officer who served as Major-General commanding the Household Division and General Officer Commanding London District from 1976 until his retirement in 1979. He was the father of actress Tilda Swinton.

== Early life ==
Arms of Clan Swinton

Swinton was the son of Brigadier Alan Henry Campbell Swinton of Kimmerghame and his wife, Mariora Beatrice Evelyn Rochfort Alers-Hankey. A member of the Swinton family, his paternal grandfather was Scottish politician and officer-of-arms George Swinton. He was educated at Harrow School, London.

== Military career ==
Swinton was commissioned into the Scots Guards on 24 March 1944, and was twice wounded towards the end of the Second World War. He was promoted to lieutenant on 8 November 1947. He served in Malaya during the Indonesia–Malaysia confrontation and was mentioned in despatches. Swinton was promoted to captain on 21 April 1952. Between 1953 and 1954, he was aide-de-camp to Field Marshal Sir William Slim, governor-general of Australia.

Swinton was successively promoted to major on 21 April 1959, to lieutenant colonel on 1 April 1966, commanding the Scots Guards (1970–71), to full colonel on 30 June 1970, and to brigadier on 31 December 1971. He was promoted to major general and appointed Major-General commanding the Household Division and General Officer Commanding London District in 1976. In 1977, he was appointed Brigadier of the Queen's Body Guard for Scotland (The Royal Company of Archers). He retired from the army in 1979.

In 1980, Swinton became a deputy lieutenant for Berwickshire, and went on to be Lord Lieutenant of Berwickshire from 1989 to 2000, escorting the Stone of Scone back to Scotland in 1996.

== Personal life ==
Swinton married the Australian-born Judith Balfour Killen (1929–2012) on 26 August 1954; they had three sons – James Christopher Swinton, Alexander Harold Swinton, and Lieutenant Colonel William Henry Swinton – and one daughter, actress Tilda Swinton.

As the laird of Kimmerghame, Swinton lived at Kimmerghame House in Duns in Berwickshire. He died there on 4 October 2018 at the age of 93.

Military offices
Preceded by Sir Philip Ward	GOC London District; 1976–1979	Succeeded by Sir Desmond Langley
