= Wolseley Haig =

British soldier, civil servant and academic

Lieutenant-Colonel Sir Wolsley Haig KCIE CSI CMG CBE
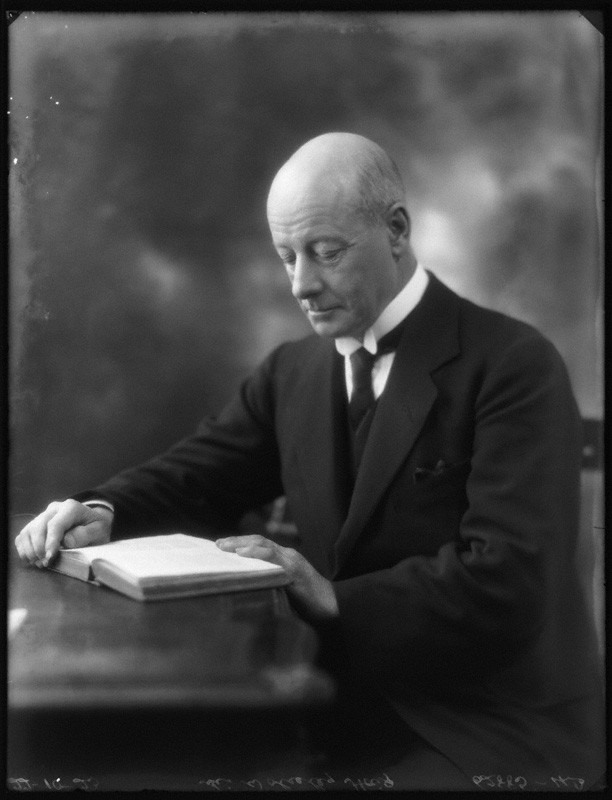
- Haig in 1923

Albany Herald
- In office 1927–1935
- Monarch: George V
- Preceded by: Sir George Swinton
- Succeeded by: Sir Thomas Innes

March Pursuivant
- In office 1923–1927
- Preceded by: Sir George Swinton
- Succeeded by: Philip Tibbetts

Personal details
- Born: 7 August 1865
- Died: 28 April 1938 (aged 72)
- Education: Wellington College, Berkshire
- Workplaces: Trinity College, Dublin; School of Oriental and African Studies
- Languages: Persian, Arabic, Hindustani

Sir Thomas Wolseley Haig KCIE CSI CMG CBE (7 August 1865 – 28 April 1938) was British soldier, civil servant and academic. He was a civil servant in British India, then Professor at Trinity College, Dublin, and later a Scottish herald.

== Early life ==
Haig was the son of Major Robert Wolseley Haig RA, FRS, (1830–72) the military astronomer, and Maria Georgina Brown. His maternal great-grandfather was Charles James Blomfield, Bishop of London. He was also descended from the Haigs of Bonnington, a branch of the Border house of Haig of Bemersyde, and was thus related to Douglas Haig, 1st Earl Haig. He was educated at Wellington College, and then Sandhurst.

== Army career ==
Haig joined the Seaforth Highlanders in 1884 and was transferred to the Indian Army in 1887 where he served in Upper Burma (1887–89) fighting "dacoits" (bandits). He won a medal and clasp for his service. He was promoted to captain on 6 February 1895, and to major on 6 February 1902.

== Indian civil service ==
Haig entered the Berar Commission in 1892 and became Assistant Commissioner, then Deputy Commissioner, Inspector-General of Police, Jails, Stamps, Registration, and Excise, and Civil and Sessions Judge. He was officiating Secretary to the Board of Examiners, Fort William, 1897 and 1898–99. He entered the Political Department in 1901 as First Assistant to the Resident at Hyderabad, a post that gave him day to day control of Berar.

Haig became Assistant Secretary to the Government of India, Foreign Department, in 1907, then Political Agent in Alwar, 1907–08. Following the assassination of Sir Curzon Wyllie in London by Madan Lal Dhingra in 1909, Haig was appointed officiating Political ADC to the Secretary of State for India 1909–10 (Lord Morley).

Haig's final years abroad were spent mostly in Persia. He was the British Consul at Kerman in 1910, became First Assistant to the Agent to the Governor-General in Baluchistan in 1912 and quickly moved on to become Consul-General and Agent to the Government of India, Khurasan, Persia in 1914–16. He held the same post at Ispahan 1916 and Tehran 1919. He retired in 1920.

== Academic career ==
Soon after Haig returned to Europe, he was appointed Professor of Arabic, Persian and Hindustani at Trinity College, Dublin. Later he was lecturer in Persian at the School of Oriental Studies, University of London. Haig was known for his meticulous attention to detail and the careful planning which went into his work. Some reviewers said that he tended to go too far and produce an overly detailed end result, but his writings appeared in the Journal of the Royal Asiatic Society, and other learned societies, and he was assigned the third and fourth volumes of The Cambridge History of India. Unfortunately, he was only able to fully complete the third volume before illness set in and the fourth had to be completed by Richard Burn to Haig's plan. It was published in 1937, the year before Haig's death.

Haig made two important translations into English of Badaoni's Tarikh-i-Bada'uni (history), a source for the reign of Emperor Akbar's, and the Burhan-i-Massir of Tabatabai, an important source for the Nizam Shahi dynasty of Ahmadnagar.

== Herald ==
Haig was appointed March Pursuivant of Arms in Scotland in 1923 and was Albany Herald 1927–35.

Coat of arms of Wolseley Haig
Escutcheon Azure a saltire between two mullets in chief and base and a decrescent and increscent in fess Argent a bordure engrailed and parted per pale Or and Vert charged with three horse shoes counterchanged.

== Personal life ==
Haig married Beatrice, older sister of Michael Lloyd Ferrar, in 1892. Beatrice died in 1927. They had one son and two daughters.

== Death ==
Haig died at home, in Kensington, London, on 28 April 1938 after a long illness.

== Selected publications ==
Books

- Hints on the study of Urdu, for the use of candidates for the lower and higher standard examinations in that language. Pioneer Press, Allahabad, 1898.
- Historical landmarks of the Deccan. Pioneer Press, Allahabad, 1907.
- The history of the Nizam Shahi kings of Ahmadnagar. British India Press/Education Society's Press, Bombay, 1923. (Reprinted from The Indian Antiquary, April 1920 – November 1923.)
- The Cambridge history of India Vol. III Turks and Afghans. University Press, Cambridge, 1928. Edited by Wolseley Haig.
- Persian grammar. Linguaphone Institute, London, c. 1930.
- Persian. Linguaphone Institute, London, 1933. (With Darab Khan, Mojtaba Minovi and Ghulām Ḣusain) (third edition) (Linguaphone Oriental language Courses)
- The Cambridge shorter history of India. University Press, Cambridge, 1934. Editor H.H. Dodwell. (contributor)
- The Cambridge history of India Vol. IV The Mughul period. University Press, Cambridge, 1937. Planned by Wolseley Haig, edited by Richard Burn.

Other works

- Various entries in The Encyclopaedia of Islam.
- Contributions to the Persian Bible published in London by B. & F.B.S., 1928.

Heraldic offices
Preceded by George Swinton	March Pursuivant; 1923-1927	Succeeded by Philip Tibbetts
Preceded by George Swinton	Albany Herald; 1927-1935	Succeeded by Thomas Innes of Learney
