= Equitable Telephone Association =

The Equitable Telephone Association was an English company incorporated on 15 December 1886 for the purpose of manufacturing and selling telephone equipment based on the patents of Alan Archibald Campbell Swinton. In late 1887 the company started to sell its equipment. In March 1888 the United Telephone Company accused it of infringing the United Telephone Company's patents. The accusation was upheld in court and the UTC was granted a perpetual injunction forbidding the ETA from selling its infringing equipment. As a result, the ETA was left with little money, no means of raising more through sales, and no wish by its shareholders to provide more. The company wound up its affairs in 1889.
