= Honor Swinton Byrne =

British actress (born 1997)

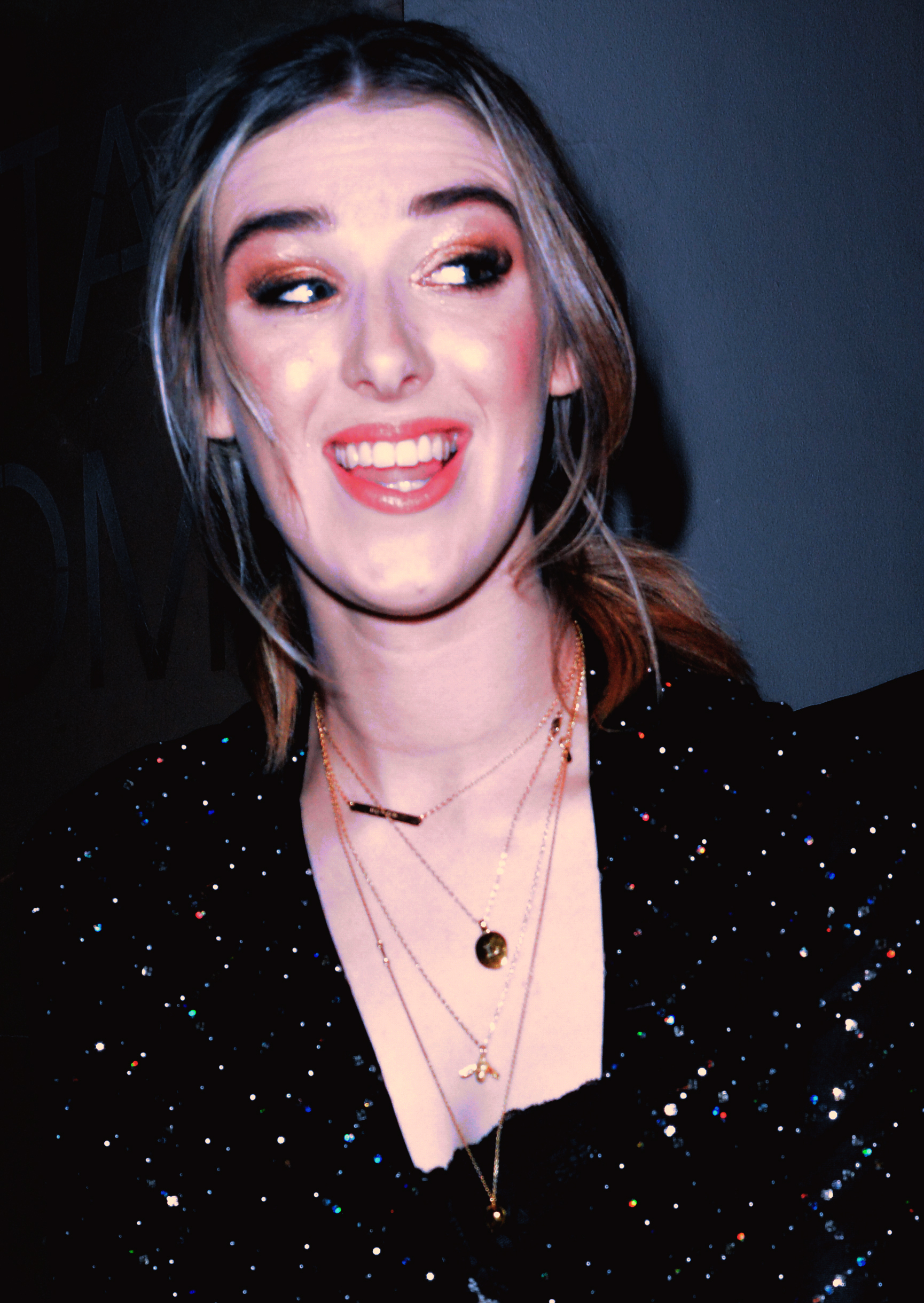
- Swinton Byrne in 2020
- Born: 6 October 1997 (age 29); London, England
- Education: Drumduan School, Forres
- Occupation: Actress
- Years active: 2009–present
- Parents: John Byrne; Tilda Swinton
- Relatives: John Swinton (grandfather); Archibald Campbell Swinton (great-great-great-grandfather); James Rannie Swinton (great-great-great-granduncle); George Swinton (great-great-grandfather); Alan Archibald Campbell-Swinton (great-great-granduncle)

Honor Swinton Byrne (born 6 October 1997) is a British actress. Swinton Byrne had a cameo role in the 2009 film I Am Love, and stars in the Joanna Hogg films The Souvenir (2019) and its sequel The Souvenir Part II (2021). She is the daughter of playwright John Byrne and actress Tilda Swinton.

== Life and career ==
Swinton Byrne was born in the Royal Borough of Kensington and Chelsea, London, on 6 October 1997. Her father is the Scottish playwright John Byrne, and her mother is the actress Tilda Swinton. She has a twin brother, Xavier. She also has two other half-siblings from her father's previous marriage.

Swinton Byrne and her brother were raised in the Scottish Highlands and attended Drumduan School, Forres, an independent alternative education school based on the philosophy of Rudolf Steiner co-founded by her mother in 2013.

Swinton Byrne's first film role was a non-speaking cameo in her mother's 2009 film I Am Love as a younger version of her mother's character, Emma. Her first starring role was in The Souvenir, a semi-autobiographical film directed by Joanna Hogg in which she stars as Julie, a film school student who embarks on a relationship with an older man. In October 2025, Swinton Byrne was announced to star alongside Sam Spruell and Jessica Madsen in the feature film Tidepools, which began principal photography in Cornwall.

== Filmography ==
=== Film ===
Year	Title	Role	Director	Notes
2009	I Am Love	Young Emma Recchi	Luca Guadagnino	Credited as Honor Byrne
2019	The Souvenir	Julie	Joanna Hogg	
2021	The Souvenir Part II	Julie	Joanna Hogg	
2023	Drift	Helen	Anthony Chen	
2025	Fuze	Clareese	David Mackenzie	
TBA	Tidepools	TBA	TBA	

=== Television ===
Year	Title	Role	Director	Notes
2023	The Crown	Lola Airedale-Cavendish-Kincaid	May el-Toukhy	Episode: "Alma Mater"
2024	A Very Royal Scandal	Princess Beatrice	Julian Jarrold	Main role
2026	War			Main role

== Awards and nominations ==
Year	Award	Category	Work	Result
2019	British Independent Film Awards	Most Promising Newcomer	The Souvenir	Nominated
2019	Florida Film Critics Circle Awards	Pauline Kael Breakout Award	The Souvenir	Nominated
2020	Columbus Film Critics Association	Breakthrough Film Artist	The Souvenir	Nominated
2020	London Critics Circle Film Awards	Young British/Irish Performer of the Year	The Souvenir	Won
2020	National Film Awards UK	Best Newcomer	The Souvenir	Nominated
2020	Newport Beach Film Festival	Brit to Watch	The Souvenir	Won
