= Friendship's Death =

1987 film by Peter Wollen

- Film poster
- Directed by: Peter Wollen
- Release date: 1987

Friendship's Death is a 1987 film directed by Peter Wollen. Wollen's only solo feature, the film stars Bill Paterson and Tilda Swinton, and is the story of the relationship between a British war correspondent and a female extraterrestrial robot on a peace mission to Earth, who, missing her intended destination of MIT, inadvertently lands in Amman, Jordan during the events of Black September 1970.

After digitalization, the film was released as a double edition on DVD plus Blu-ray with English and French subtitles by the British Film Institute in 2021.
