= Clan Swinton =

Scottish Border clan

- Crest: A boar chained to a tree
- Motto: J'espere ("I hope")

Profile
- Region: Border
- District: Berwickshire

Chief
- Rolfe William Swinton of that Ilk
- Chief of the Name and Arms of Swinton
- Seat: New York, United States
- Historic seat: Swinton House, Berwickshire

Clan Swinton is a Scottish Border clan of Anglo-Saxon origin whose ancestral lands straddle the historic boundary between England and Scotland. It is among the oldest landed families in Britain, with its name said to derive from the Barony of Swinton in Berwickshire, granted to Eadulf Ros by King Malcolm III of Scotland around 1060. It claims to be one of few families in Britain that can trace its patrilineal descent back to a pre-Norman era Anglo-Saxon ancestor (the other four being the Arden family, the Berkeley family, the Wentworth family, and the Grindlay family), but the claim is disputed.

== History ==
=== Origins of the clan ===
The Swinton chiefs are likely to have been of Anglo-Saxon origin, possibly descended from the prominent nobles of the kingdom of Northumbria. The kingdom of Northumberland straddled the modern day border between Scotland and England. According to tradition the name was acquired for their bravery in clearing the country of wild boar, with the family arms alluding to this legend. However, the name is more likely to have been of territorial origin: the village of Swinewood in the county of Berwickshire was granted by Edgar, King of Scotland, son of Malcolm III of Scotland to Coldingham Priory in 1098 following the Norman Conquest of England to the south.

In around 1136/7, Ernulf de Swinton received one of the first private charters recorded in Scotland which confirmed his property from David I of Scotland. This is one of two original charters of David kept in the cartulary of Durham, both to Ernulf, wherein he is told to "hold his lands as freely as any of the king’s barons", and importantly is termed Miles in both, making him the first recorded instance of a Scottish Knight.

Of note, the charters reference Ernulf's father (Udard), grandfather (Liulf) and great-grandfather (Eadulf) as holding the land before him. Eadulf is believed to have been granted the land by his cousin Malcolm III of Scotland in return for military support against Macbeth. This, according to 20th-century historian James Lees-Milne, would make Eadulf the first subject of Scotland whose land ownership could be proved, and means the Swinton Family would by this hypothesis be one of only five (see Arden family, Berkeley family, Grindlay family, Wentworth family) that could trace its unbroken land ownership and lineage to before the Norman Conquest, making it one of the oldest landed families in Britain.

The clan has held the Baronies of Swinton and Cranshaws. The latter is now separated from the clan. The family holds Feudal Barony status with numerous charters confirming this.

=== Wars of Scottish Independence ===
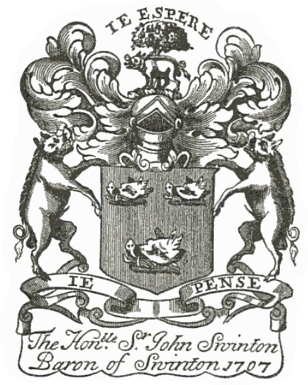
The Bookplate of Sir John Swinton, titled 'Baron of Swinton'

In 1296 Henry de Swinton and his brother, William, priest of the church of Swinton, appear on the Ragman Rolls swearing fealty to Edward I of England. Henry's great-grandson was Sir John Swinton who was a distinguished soldier and statesman during the reigns of Robert II of Scotland and Robert III of Scotland. In 1388 he was a commander at the Battle of Otterburn where the Scots were victorious. His second wife was Isabel Douglas, Countess of Mar but they had no children. His third wife was Princess Margaret who bore him a son, Sir John Swinton, 15th of that Ilk.

=== France, Hundred Years War ===
Sir John Swinton, 15th of that Ilk was a warrior who fought at the Battle of Baugé in France and is credited with killing the Duke of Clarence, brother of Henry V of England. The incident appears in a poem by Sir Walter Scott, The Lay of the Last Minstrel. However Swinton was later killed in 1424 at the Battle of Verneuil in France.

=== Modern history ===
In 1567 Sir John Swinton was one of the Scottish barons who signed the bond of protection of the infant James VI of Scotland against the Earl of Bothwell on his marriage to the child's mother, Mary, Queen of Scots.

In 1640 Sir Alexander Swinton, the 22nd chief, became sheriff of Berwickshire. He died in 1652 but left six sons and five daughters. His second son was another Alexander Swinton who was appointed to the Supreme Court of Scotland in 1688 and took the title Lord Mersington.

The eldest son, John, was colonel for the regiment of Berwickshire, and in 1651 he was taken prisoner at the Battle of Worcester. His brother, Robert, died attempting to carry off Oliver Cromwell's standard. In 1655 John was appointed by the Lord Protector to the Council of State he established to assist in ruling Scotland. He was said to have been Cromwell's most trusted man in Scotland and his involvement with Cromwell led to his being tried for treason in 1661. He escaped execution but his estates were forfeited and he was imprisoned for six years. He was succeeded by his son, Alexander in 1679 but he died without issue.

Alexander's brother, Sir John, succeeded as the twenty-fifth Laird of Swinton. After a successful career as a merchant in Holland he returned to Scotland in the wake of the Glorious Revolution of 1688 which brought William of Orange to the throne with his wife, Queen Mary.

Swinton sat in both the Scottish Parliament and, later, in the British, at Westminster. He was appointed as the President of the Committee for Trade in Scotland. John Swinton, the twenty-seventh Laird, became a member of the Supreme Court in 1782, taking the title Lord Swinton.

The modern Swintons have produced some notable public figures. Captain George Swinton, descended from the Swintons of Kimmerghame, a cadet of the chiefly house, was Lord Lyon King of Arms, and Secretary to the Order of the Thistle from 1926 to 1929, Major-General Sir Ernest Dunlop Swinton was the author of The Defence of Duffer's Drift and was one of the driving forces behind early tank development and training in WWI. Alan Archibald Campbell-Swinton is regarded by many as the father of modern television. A prominent member of the family is the actress Tilda Swinton, who is a great-granddaughter of Captain George Swinton.

== Clan Chief ==
The chief of Clan Swinton is Rolfe William Swinton, 36th of that Ilk. His son, Maxim Jasper Swinton, is in line to be the 37th of that Ilk.

== Clan Castles ==
- Swinton House in Swinton, Berwickshire is a classical mansion dating from 1800. However it stands on the site of a castle that was destroyed by fire in 1797. The lands had been held by the Swintons since the time of Malcolm Canmore (Malcolm III of Scotland) in the eleventh century. The property had passed to the Clan Macnab by the nineteenth century. The chiefly Swintons now live in New York, USA.
- Cranshaws Castle was held by the Swintons from 1400 to 1702.
- Kimmerghame House and estate was bought by Archibald Swinton on his return from India serving under Clive, along with Manderston House (though this was later sold in favour of Kimmerghame) in the second half of the eighteenth century. A new house was commissioned by the family and built by David Bryce in 1851, although it was badly damaged by fire in 1938 and only partially rebuilt. Until 2018, the laird was Major-General Sir John Swinton, a former Lord Lieutenant of Berwickshire and the father of the actress Tilda Swinton.
- Little Swinton near Coldstream, site of a castle once held by the Swintons but destroyed by the English in 1482.
- Mersington Tower near Greenlaw, site of a castle originally held by the Clan Kerr and then by the Swintons. It was burned by the English in 1545. Alexander Swinton, Lord Mersington was amongst those who led an attack on the Chapel Royal at Holyrood during a Protestant riot in 1688.
- Stevenson near Peebles, site of a tower house originally held by the Swintons but passed by marriage to the Clan Sinclair in the seventeenth century.
