= Tilda Swinton =

Scottish actress (born 1960)

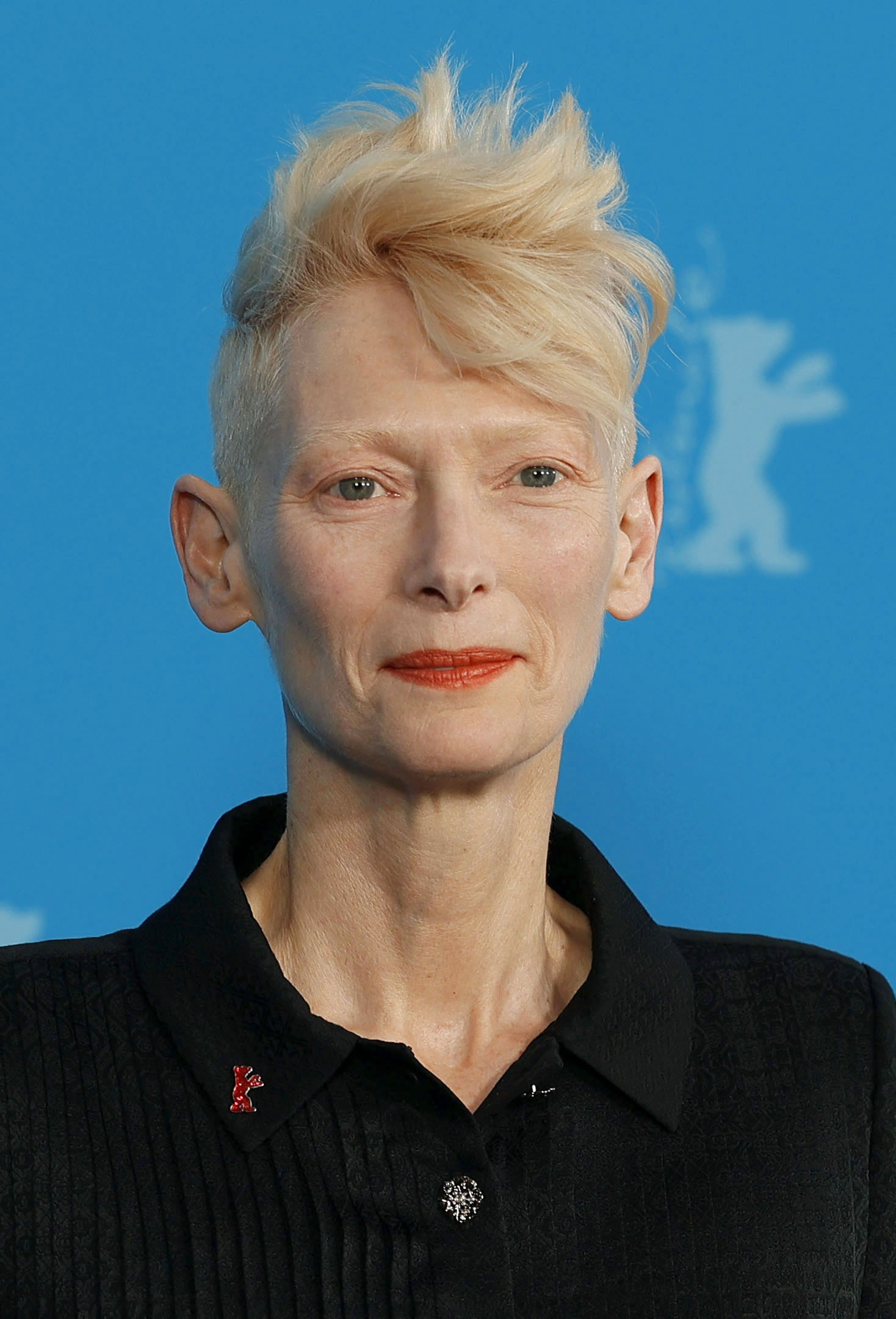
- Swinton at the 2025 Berlinale
- Born: Katherine Matilda Swinton; 5 November 1960 (age 66); London, England
- Other name: Lutz Ebersdorf
- Education: University of Cambridge (BA)
- Occupation: Actress
- Years active: 1984–present
- Works: Full list
- Partners: John Byrne (1989–2004); Sandro Kopp (2004–present)
- Children: 2, including Honor
- Father: Sir John Swinton of Kimmerghame
- Relatives: Archibald Campbell Swinton (great-great-grandfather); James Rannie Swinton (great-great-granduncle); George Swinton (great-grandfather); Alan Archibald Campbell-Swinton (great-granduncle)
- Family: Swinton
- Awards: Full list

Katherine Matilda "Tilda" Swinton (born 5 November 1960) is a Scottish actress. Known for her performances on both stage and screen, she has received various accolades, including an Academy Award, two BAFTAs, and a Volpi Cup, in addition to nominations for five Actor Awards and four Golden Globe Awards. In 2020, The New York Times ranked her as one of the greatest actors of the 21st century.

Swinton began her career by appearing in Derek Jarman's experimental films Caravaggio (1986), The Last of England (1987), War Requiem (1989), and The Garden (1990). For her portrayal of Isabella of France in Edward II (1991), she won the Volpi Cup for Best Actress. She next starred in Orlando (1992), Female Perversions (1996), and The Beach (2000), and was nominated for the Golden Globe Award for Best Actress for her portrayal of a desperate mother in The Deep End (2001).

Swinton received the Academy Award for Best Supporting Actress for playing a corporate attorney in Michael Clayton (2007). Other notable credits include Vanilla Sky (2001), Adaptation (2002), Young Adam (2003), Constantine, Broken Flowers (both 2005), Burn After Reading, The Curious Case of Benjamin Button (both 2008), I Am Love (2009), We Need to Talk About Kevin (2011), Only Lovers Left Alive (2013), Snowpiercer (2014), Trainwreck (2015), Suspiria (2018), Memoria (2021), The Eternal Daughter (2022), and The Room Next Door (2024). Swinton garnered mainstream recognition with her roles as the White Witch in the Chronicles of Narnia series (2005–2010) and the Ancient One in the Marvel Cinematic Universe franchise (2016–2019). She frequently collaborates with filmmaker Wes Anderson, appearing in Moonrise Kingdom (2012), The Grand Budapest Hotel (2014), The French Dispatch (2021), and Asteroid City (2023).

Swinton has received various honours throughout her career, including a special tribute by the Museum of Modern Art in 2013, the British Film Institute Fellowship and the Golden Lion for Lifetime Achievement in 2020, and the Honorary Golden Bear in 2025.

== Early life and education ==
Katherine Matilda Swinton was born on 5 November 1960 in London, the daughter of Sir John Swinton of Kimmerghame (1925–2018) and Judith, Lady Swinton (née Balfour Killen; 1929–2012). She has three brothers and grew up at the family's estate, Kimmerghame House. Her father was a retired major-general in the British Army, and was Lord Lieutenant of Berwickshire from 1989 to 2000. Her father was Scottish and her mother was Australian. The Swintons are an ancient Scots family whose members can trace their lineage to the 9th century. Swinton considers herself "first and foremost" a Scot.

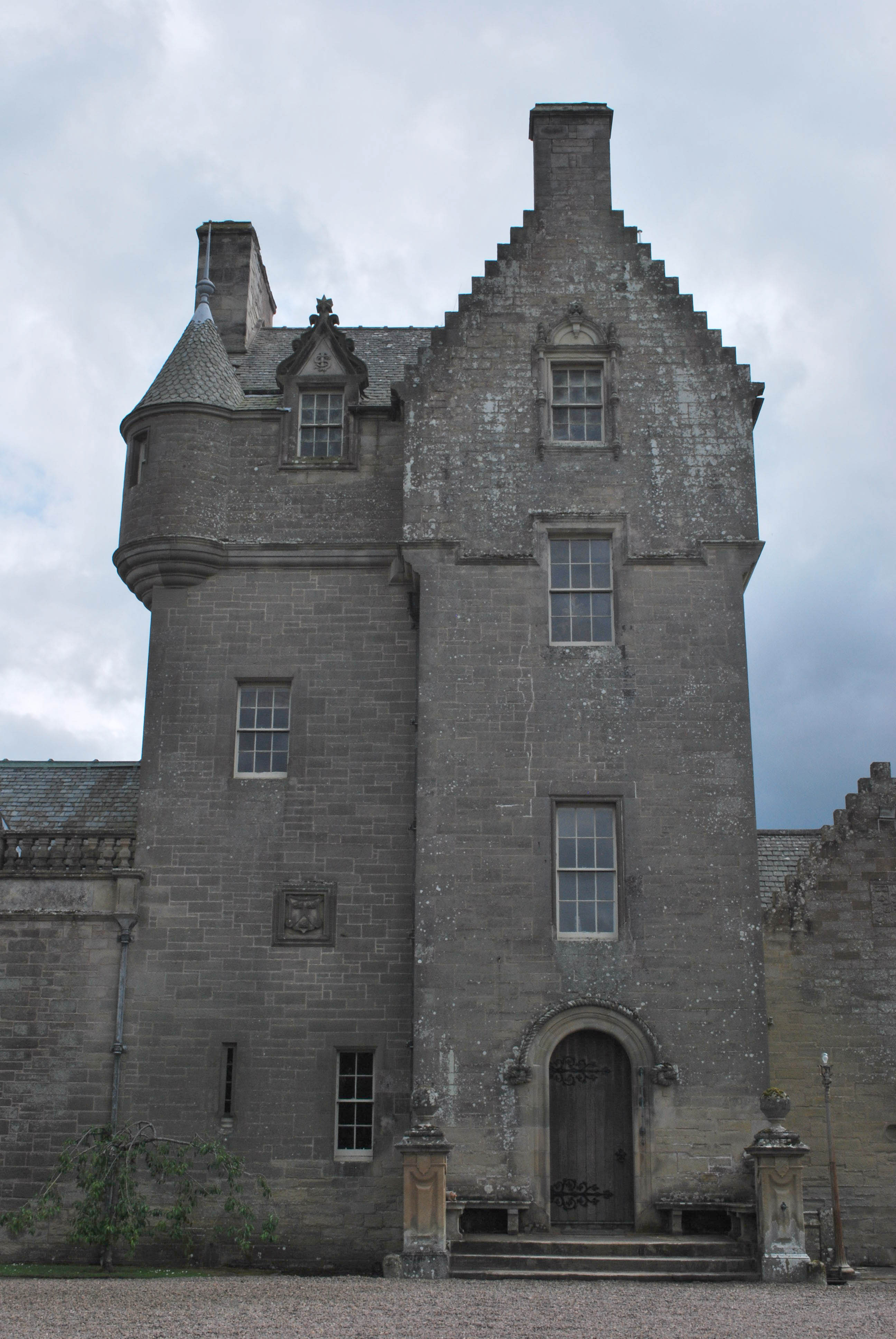
Kimmerghame House, Swinton's childhood home

Swinton attended three independent schools: Queen's Gate School in London, the West Heath Girls' School, and also Fettes College for a brief period. West Heath was a boarding school, where she was a classmate and friend of Lady Diana Spencer, the future Princess of Wales. As an adult, Swinton has spoken out against boarding schools, stating that West Heath was "a very lonely and isolating environment" and that she thinks boarding schools "are a very cruel setting in which to grow up and I don't feel children benefit from that type of education. Children need their parents and the love parents can provide." Swinton spent two years as a volunteer in South Africa and Kenya before university.

In 1983, Swinton graduated from New Hall at the University of Cambridge with a degree in social and political sciences. While at Cambridge, she joined the Communist Party; she later joined the Scottish Socialist Party. It was in college that Swinton began performing on stage. (Note: Among these early performances was a participation of Swinton in one of the earliest sketches written by the yet-to-become-famous comic duo Stephen Fry and Hugh Laurie, during their Footlights collaboration years at Cambridge. As Stephen Fry recalled, during a public talk he gave regarding his autobiography about those early career days, that was a sketch about an American courtroom, which was to be played by Emma Thompson, Stephen Fry and Hugh Laurie themselves, and needed someone to be the judge.)

== Career ==
=== 1980s: Early work ===
Swinton joined the Royal Shakespeare Company in 1984, appearing in Measure for Measure. She also worked with the Traverse Theatre in Edinburgh, starring in No Son of Mine written and directed by Philippe Gaulier in 1985 and Mann ist Mann by Manfred Karge in 1987. On television, she appeared as Julia in the 1986 mini-series Zastrozzi, A Romance based on the 1810 Gothic novel Zastrozzi by Percy Bysshe Shelley. Her first film was Caravaggio in 1986, directed by Derek Jarman. In 1987, Swinton starred along Bill Paterson in Peter Wollen's Friendship's Death, she played a female extraterrestrial robot on a peace mission to Earth. In 1988, Swinton was a member of the jury at the 38th Berlin International Film Festival.

Swinton went on to star in several Jarman films, including The Last of England (1987), War Requiem (1989) opposite Laurence Olivier, and Edward II (1991), for which she won the Volpi Cup for Best Actress at the 1991 Venice Film Festival. She performed in the performance art piece Volcano Saga by Joan Jonas in 1989. The 28-minute video art piece is based on a 13th-century Icelandic Laxdæla Saga, and it tells a mythological story of a young woman whose dreams tell of the future.

=== 1990s: Rise to prominence ===
Swinton played the title role in Orlando (1992), Sally Potter's film version of the novel by Virginia Woolf. The part allowed Swinton to explore matters of gender presentation onscreen, which reflected her lifelong interest in androgynous style. Swinton later reflected on the role in an interview accompanied by a striking photo shoot. "People talk about androgyny in all sorts of dull ways," said Swinton, noting that the recent rerelease of Orlando had her thinking again about its pliancy. She referred to 1920s playful, androgynous French artist Claude Cahun: "Cahun looked at the limitlessness of an androgynous gesture, which I've always been interested in."

In 1993, she was a member of the jury at the 18th Moscow International Film Festival. In 1995, with producer Joanna Scanlan, Swinton developed a performance/installation live art piece in the Serpentine Gallery, London, where she was on display to the public for a week, asleep or apparently so, in a glass case, as a piece of performance art. The piece is sometimes incorrectly credited to Cornelia Parker, whom Swinton invited to collaborate for the installation in London. The performance, titled The Maybe, was repeated in 1996 at the Museo Barracco in Rome and in 2013 at the Museum of Modern Art in New York. In 1996, she appeared in the music video for Orbital's "The Box".

=== 2000s: Career breakthrough ===
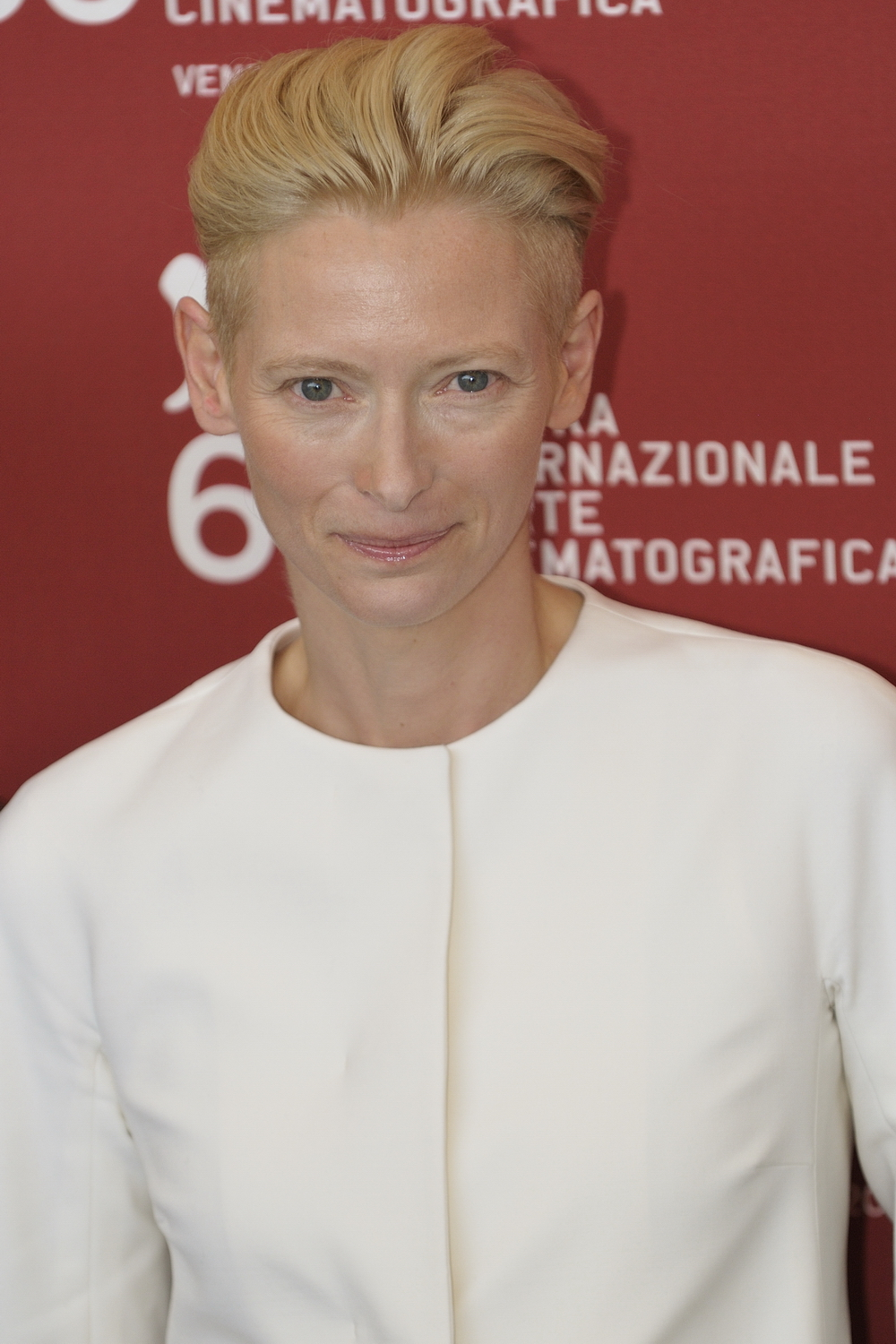
Swinton at the 2009 Venice International Film Festival

The early 2000s saw Swinton move toward mainstream projects, including the leading role in the American film The Deep End (2001), in which she played the mother of a gay son she suspects of killing his boyfriend. For this performance, she was nominated for a Golden Globe Award. She appeared as a supporting character in the films The Beach (2000), featuring Leonardo DiCaprio, Vanilla Sky (2001), and as the archangel Gabriel in Constantine. Swinton appeared in the British films The Statement (2003) and Young Adam (2003). For her performance in the latter film, she received the British Academy Scotland Award for Best Actress.

Swinton has collaborated with the fashion designers Viktor & Rolf. She was the focus of their One Woman Show 2003, in which they made all the models look like copies of Swinton, and she read a poem (of her own) that included the line, "There is only one you. Only one." In 2005, Swinton performed as the White Witch Jadis, in the film version of The Chronicles of Narnia: The Lion, the Witch and the Wardrobe, and as Audrey Cobb in the Mike Mills film adaptation of the novel Thumbsucker. Swinton later had cameos in Narnia's sequels The Chronicles of Narnia: Prince Caspian and The Chronicles of Narnia: The Voyage of the Dawn Treader. In August 2006, she opened the new Screen Academy Scotland production centre in Edinburgh. In 2007, Swinton played ruthless corporate attorney Karen Crowder in Michael Clayton. Her performance earned her Golden Globe, Screen Actors Guild, Critics' Choice, BAFTA and Oscar nominations. She went on to win the BAFTA and Oscar. Her voice appeared on Max Richter's album The Blue Notebooks in 2004.

In July 2008, Swinton founded the film festival Ballerina Ballroom Cinema of Dreams. The event took place in a ballroom in Nairn on Scotland's Moray Firth in August. Swinton next appeared in the 2008 Coen Brothers film Burn After Reading. She was cast in the role of wealthy British socialite Elizabeth Abbott in The Curious Case of Benjamin Button, starring alongside Cate Blanchett and Brad Pitt. She collaborated with artist Patrick Wolf on his 2009 album The Bachelor, contributing four spoken word pieces. Also in 2009, she and Mark Cousins embarked on a project where they mounted a 33.5-tonne portable cinema on a large truck, hauling it manually through the Scottish Highlands, creating a travelling independent film festival. The project was featured prominently in a documentary titled Cinema Is Everywhere. The festival was repeated in 2011. She also had a starring role as the eponymous character in Erick Zonca's Julia, which premiered at the 2008 Berlin International Film Festival and saw a U.S. release in May 2009.

=== 2010s: Continued acclaim ===
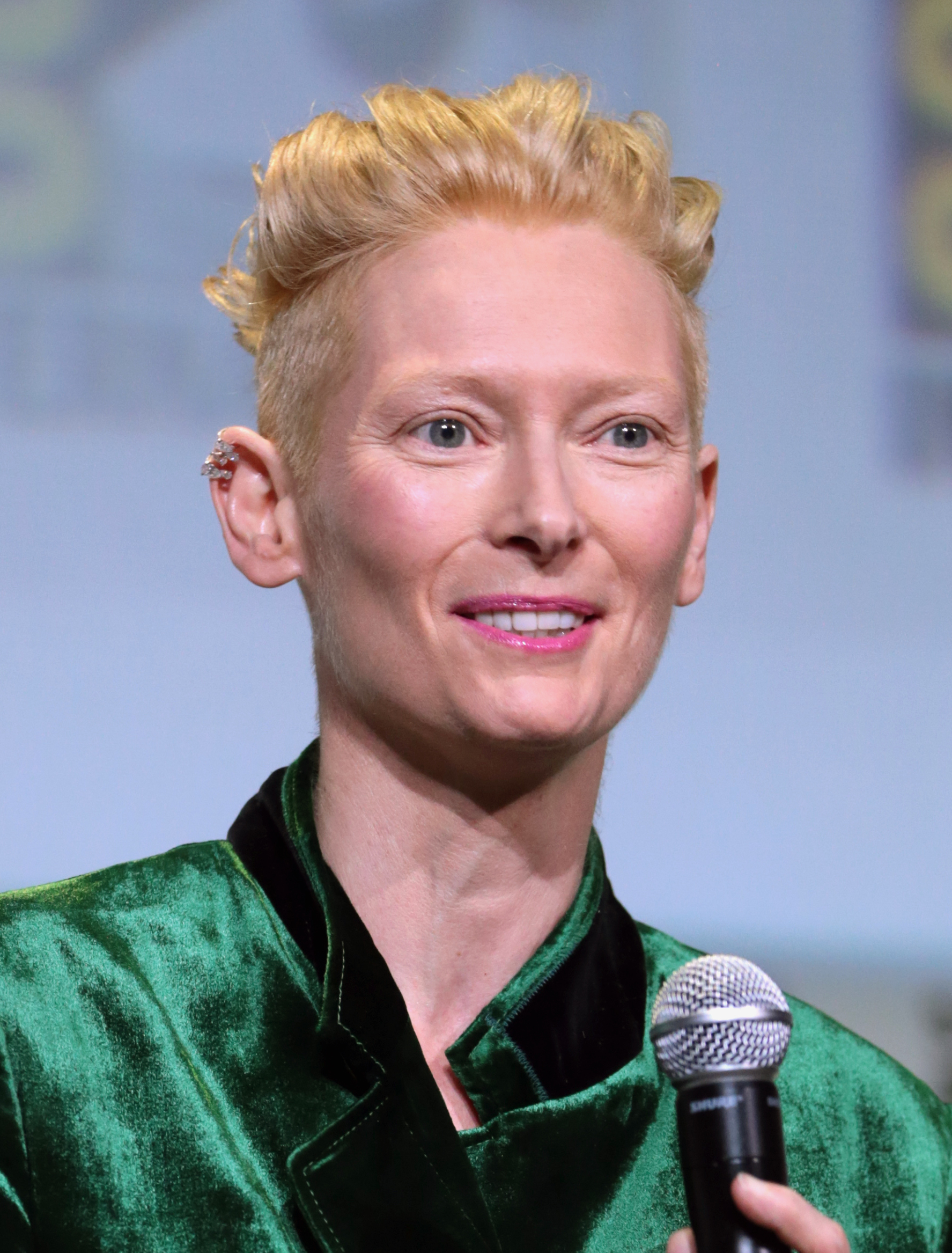
Swinton at the 2016 San Diego Comic-Con

Swinton starred in the film adaptation of the novel We Need to Talk About Kevin, released in October 2011. She portrayed the mother of the title character, a teenage boy who commits a high school massacre. In 2012, she was cast in Jim Jarmusch's Only Lovers Left Alive. The film premiered at the Cannes Film Festival on 23 May 2013, and was released in the U.S. in the first half of 2014. Also in 2012, Swinton appeared in Doug Aitken's SONG 1, an outdoor video installation created for the Hirshhorn Museum and Sculpture Garden in Washington, D.C. In November of the same year, she and Sandro Kopp made cameo appearances in episode 6 of the BBC comedy Getting On. In 2014, she played secondary antagonist Minister Mason in Bong Joon Ho's post-apocalyptic action thriller film Snowpiercer. The film received critical acclaim and appeared on many film critics' top ten lists of 2014. She received a Critics' Choice nomination.

She co-founded Drumduan Upper School in Findhorn, Scotland in 2013 with Ian Sutherland McCook. Swinton and McCook both had children who attended the Moray Steiner School, whose students graduate at age 14. They founded Drumduan partly to allow their children to continue their Steiner educations with neither grading nor tests. Swinton resigned as a director of Drumduan in April 2019.

In February 2013, she played the part of David Bowie's wife in the promotional video for his song "The Stars (Are Out Tonight)", directed by Floria Sigismondi. In 2013, she was named as one of the 50 best-dressed over 50 by The Guardian. In 2015, she starred in Luca Guadagnino's thriller A Bigger Splash, alongside Dakota Johnson, Matthias Schoenaerts, and Ralph Fiennes. Also in 2015, she played Dianne, Amy Schumer's character's editor on S'Nuff Magazine, in Trainwreck.

Swinton played the Ancient One in the Marvel Cinematic Universe, appearing in the 2016 film Doctor Strange and the 2019 film Avengers: Endgame. Swinton starred in Luca Guadagnino's 2018 remake of the horror film Suspiria. She played three roles, and was credited as Lutz Ebersdorf for one of them. She was ranked one of the best dressed women in 2018 by fashion website Net-a-Porter.

=== 2020s: Current work ===
In 2021, Swinton starred as newspaper writer J. K. L. Berensen in the Wes Anderson anthology film The French Dispatch, and as Jessica Holland in Apichatpong Weerasethakul's first English-language film, Memoria. In 2022 she starred in George Miller's fantasy film Three Thousand Years of Longing and voiced Wood Sprite and Death in the animated film Guillermo del Toro's Pinocchio. Also that year she played dual roles of mother and daughter in Joanna Hogg's gothic drama The Eternal Daughter (2022). Richard Brody of The New Yorker praised Swinton's performance describing the acting feat as a "tour de force". The following year, she reunited with Wes Anderson for the film Asteroid City (2023). Swinton starred in Julio Torres's surrealist A24 comedy Problemista and David Fincher's action thriller The Killer both released in 2023.

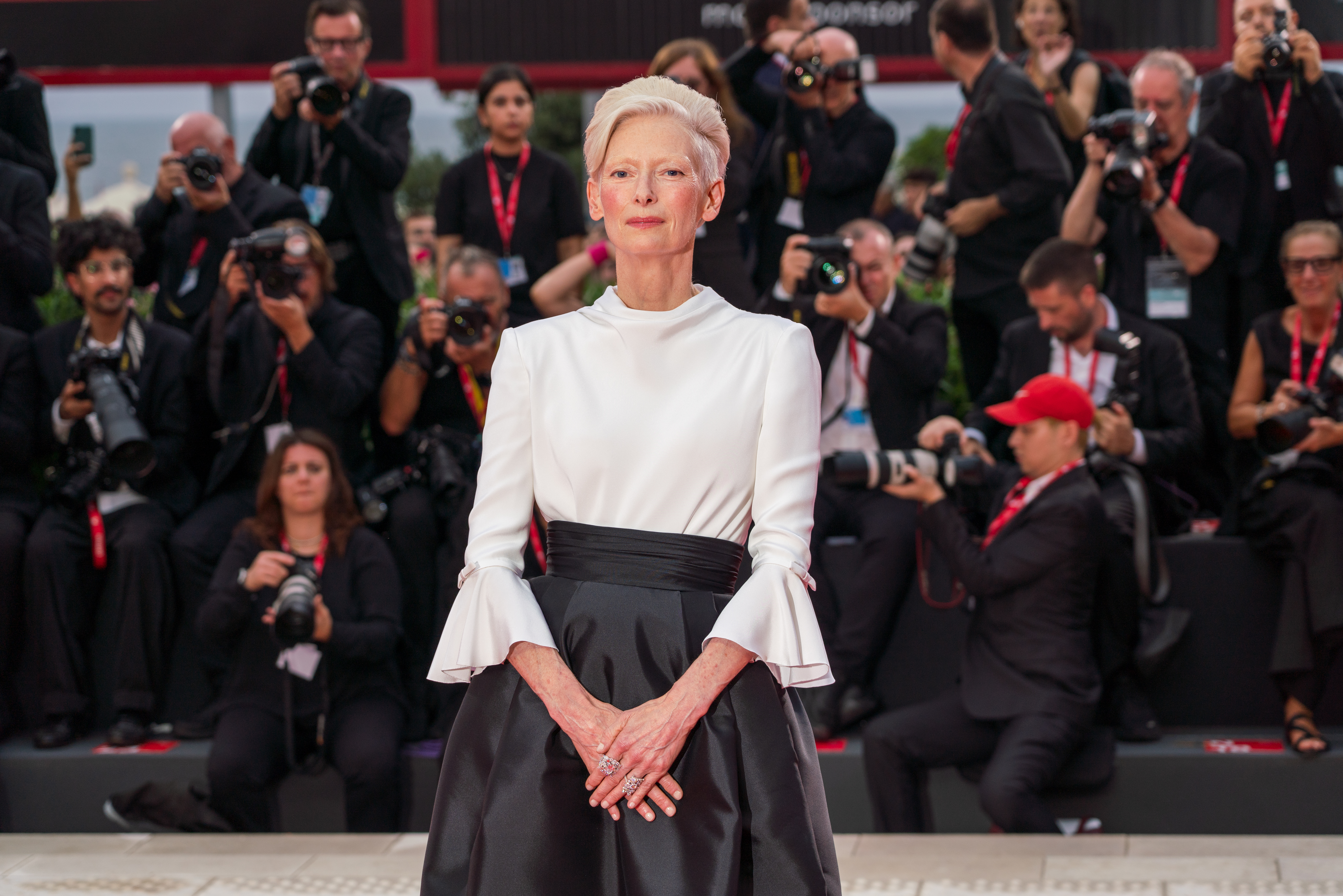
Swinton at the 2025 Venice Film Festival

In 2024 Swinton had a cameo in the Amazon Prime series The Boys, in which she voiced Ambrosius, the Deep's octopus lover. Also In 2024, Swinton starred opposite Julianne Moore in Pedro Almodóvar’s English-language drama ‘’The Room Next Door’’. The film premiered at the 81st Venice International Film Festival, where it won the Golden Lion, and received widespread acclaim for the performances of its two leads. For her role, Swinton earned a nomination for Best Actress – Motion Picture – Drama at the 82nd Golden Globe Awards.

In May 2025, she collaborated with the champagne brand Dom Pérignon for a campaign named "Creation is an Eternal Journey." She played alongside Colin Farrell in Edward Berger's 2025 movie Ballad of a Small Player. Swinton is a signatory of the Film Workers for Palestine boycott pledge that was published in September 2025. In 2025, together with Olivier Saillard, she co-created a spectacle Embodying Passolini, in which she used costumes from Pier Paolo Pasolini films. In 2026, she provided voice over narration and executive produced a documentary about Patrick Wolf, whom she previously collaborated with in 2009. It was announced that Swinton would make her New York stage debut in the off-Broadway production of the revival of Manfred Karge’s play Man to Man at the Lucille Lortel Theater in 2027.

== Personal life ==
Although born in London and having attended various schools in England, Swinton describes her nationality as Scottish, citing her childhood, growing up in Scotland and Scottish aristocratic family background. In 1997, Swinton gave birth to twins, Honor and Xavier Swinton Byrne, with John Byrne, a Scottish artist and playwright. She moved to Scotland in 1997, and as of 2023 she lives in Nairn, overlooking the Moray Firth in the Highland region of Scotland, with her children and partner Sandro Kopp, a German painter, with whom she has been in a relationship since 2004.

In a 2021 interview with Vogue, Swinton mentioned that she identifies herself as queer. She was quoted as saying, "I'm very clear that queer is actually, for me anyway, to do with sensibility. I always felt I was queer – I was just looking for my queer circus, and I found it. And having found it, it's my world." She said that her collaborations with several creative visionaries helped her to find a sense of familiar belonging. Swinton also described her gender in the interview, saying "I don't know if I could ever really say that I was a girl," she says. "I was kind of a boy for a long time. I don't know, who knows? It changes." In a 2022 profile by The Guardian, she stated, "It just so happened I'd also been a queer kid – not in terms of my sexual life, just odd."

In January 2022, Swinton said she was recovering from long COVID, with symptoms including having trouble getting out of bed, a bad cough, vertigo, and memory loss. She also stated that she was considering quitting acting to "retrain as a palliative carer", informed both by the trauma of living through the AIDS epidemic in the UK (feeling a similarity between her experiences and those of the characters in Russell T Davies's 2021 TV drama miniseries It's a Sin) and "witnessing the loving support her parents received from professional carers at the end of their lives, and the impact it had on her."

=== Activism ===
In 2018, Swinton stated her support for Scottish independence.

Swinton signed a 2009 petition in support of director Roman Polanski, who had been detained while travelling to a film festival because of sexual abuse charges filed against him in a 1977 incident in which he is accused of drugging, raping and sodomizing a 13-year-old American girl during a photo shoot for French Vogue in Beverley Hills, California. The petition argued that his detention undermined the tradition of film festivals as a place for works to be shown "freely and safely" and that the arrest of filmmakers travelling to neutral countries could open the door "for actions of which no-one can know the effects".

The actress has been a staunch advocate for Palestinian rights throughout her career, starting as early as her role in Friendship's Death, a movie that is sympathetic to the Palestinian cause. She has routinely expressed strong support for the Palestinian people, such as by criticising Israel's war in the Gaza Strip and calling for a ceasefire in October 2023, which she reiterated in February 2025 during a speech at the Berlin International Film Festival, condemning Israel's "state-perpetrated and internationally enabled mass murder" and President Donald Trump's plans for Gaza. The same year, she was one of thousands of artists that signed an open letter organised by Artists for Palestine UK, and has been wearing a scarf with Palestinian colours in a Vogue photo-shoot. She again signed an open letter in 2025 calling on the UK government to end its complicity in the violence, and has routinely joined A-list actors, filmmakers and industry figures pledging to boycott Israeli film institutes complicit in genocide. In December 2025 Swinton joined a list of over two hundred cultural figures worldwide calling for Israel to release the jailed Palestinian leader Marwan Barghouti.

In June 2025, in response to the then-proposed proscription of Palestine Action as a terrorist organisation, Swinton urged the government to reject the ban. In October 2026, she signed an open letter backing author Sally Rooney, whose books were withdrawn from sale in the United Kingdom due to her support for Palestine Action, and calling the withdrawal an "affront to basic principles of free speech and expression".

== Acting credits and accolades ==
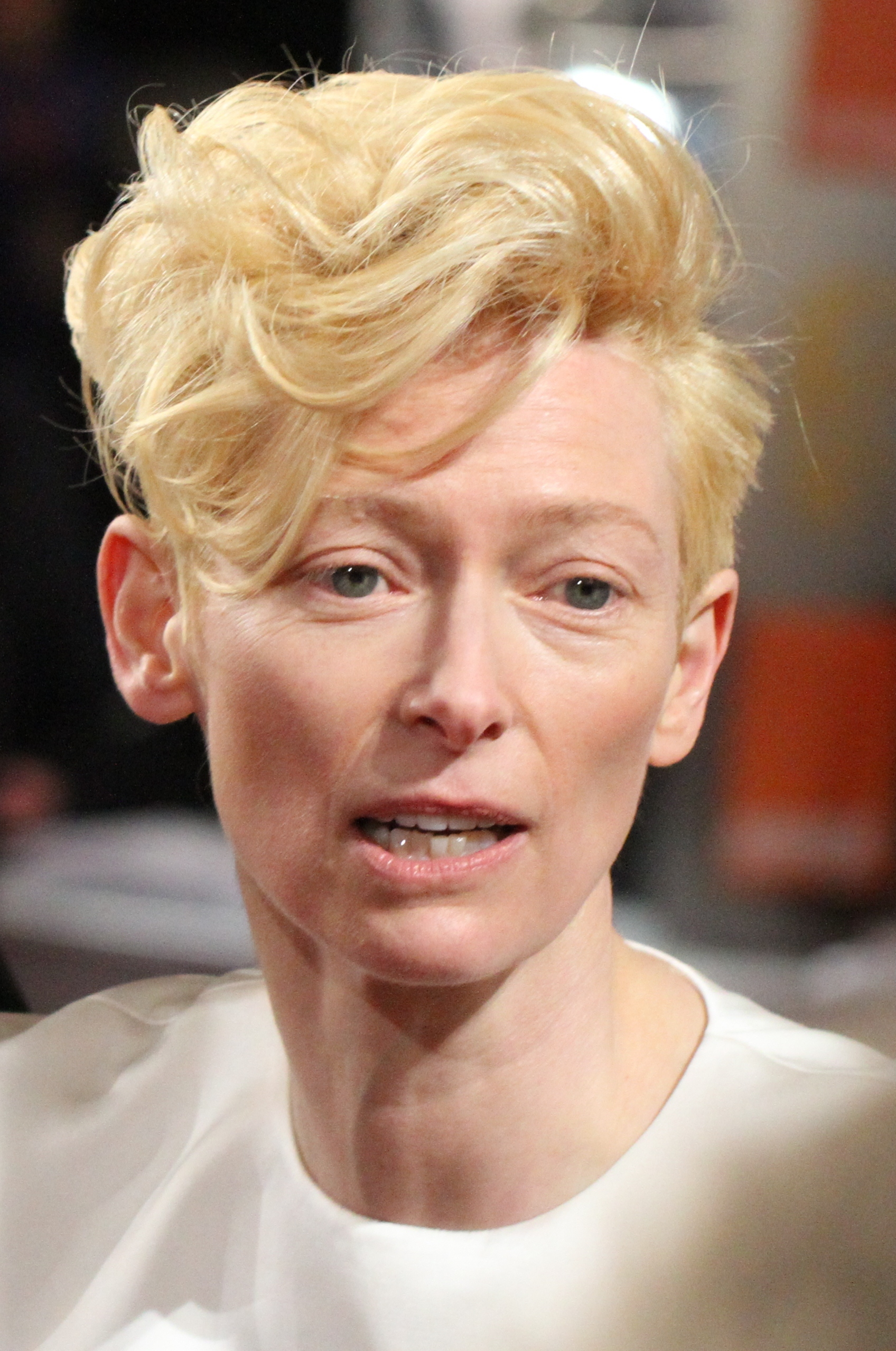
Swinton at the 2012 British Academy Film Awards

Swinton has appeared in over 60 films and 13 television projects. She has received the Academy Award for Best Supporting Actress, the British Academy Scotland Award for Best Actress, the British Academy Film Award for Best Actress in a Supporting Role, the Volpi Cup for Best Actress, in addition to nominations for five Critics' Choice Awards and four Golden Globe Awards.

In 2006, Swinton was given an honorary degree by the Edinburgh Napier University for her services to performing arts. In 2020, she was awarded the British Film Institute Fellowship for her "daringly eclectic and striking talents as a performer and filmmaker and recognizes her great contribution to film culture, independent film exhibition and philanthropy." That year, The New York Times ranked her thirteenth on its list of "The Greatest Actors of the 21st Century".

In 2022, she was presented with the FIAF Award "for her work on the preservation and promotion of archive film, film history and women's role in it". She was also recognised with the Richard Harris Award by the British Independent Film Awards in recognition of her contributions to the British film industry.

== See also ==
- List of British actors
- List of Scottish actors
- List of Academy Award winners and nominees from Great Britain
- List of LGBTQ Academy Award winners and nominees — Confirmed individuals for Best Supporting Actress
- List of actors with Academy Award nominations
- List of actors in Royal Shakespeare Company productions
