= Kimmerghame House =

Country house in Scotland

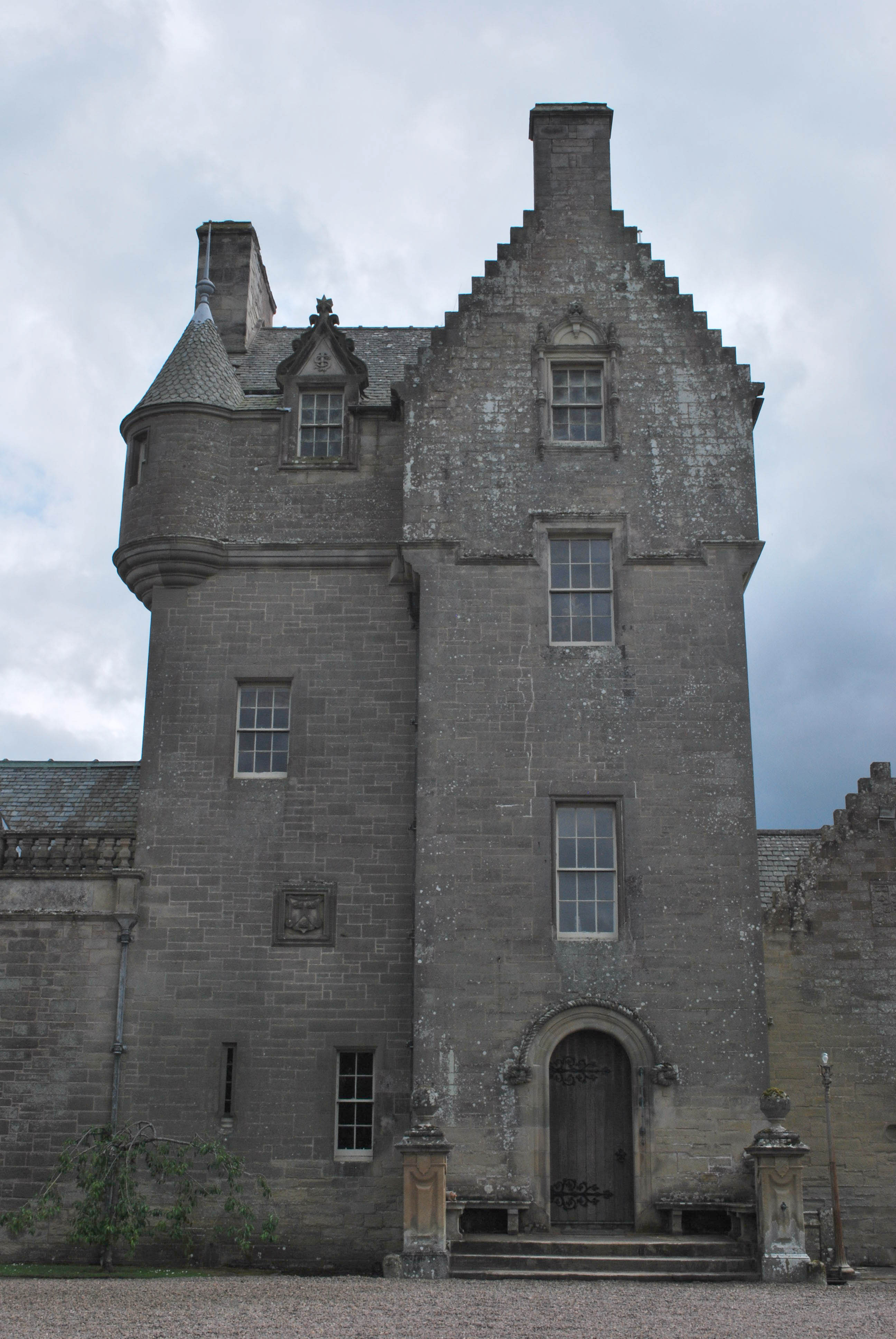
- Kimmerghame House in 2017
- Interactive map of the Kimmerghame House area

General information
- Architectural style: Baronial
- Location: Scottish Borders
- Current tenants: Swintons of Kimmerghame

Design and construction
- Architect: David Bryce
- Location within Scottish Borders
- 55°45′23″N 2°17′41″W

Listed Building – Category B
- Official name: Kimmerghame House with terrace and boundary walls, boar statues, garden seat, sundial, gates and gatepiers
- Designated: 9 October 1981
- Reference no.: LB2133

Listed Building – Category B
- Official name: Kimmerghame House, stables
- Designated: 9 June 1971
- Reference no.: LB44503

Inventory of Gardens and Designed Landscapes in Scotland
- Official name: Kimmerghame
- Designated: 30 June 2011
- Reference no.: GDL00239

Kimmerghame House is a 19th-century mansion in the Scottish Borders, located 4 kilometres (2.5 mi) south-east of Duns by the Blackadder Water. It is the seat of the Swintons of Kimmerghame, a branch of the Lowland Clan Swinton. It was the childhood home of actress Tilda Swinton. The house was designed in the Scottish Baronial style by David Bryce in 1851. Kimmerghame is protected as a category B listed building and the grounds are included on the Inventory of Gardens and Designed Landscapes in Scotland.

== History ==
Kimmerghame was held by the Moreham family, before passing to the Polwarth family whose heiress married into the Sinclair family in the 14th century with the estate passing to the Home family in the 15th century. The estate was the site of an earlier house, the home of Sir Andrew Home in the 1730s. An inventory of the house and its furnishing survives from this period. Old Kimmerghame house and estate was purchased in 1770 by Captain Archibald Swinton of Manderston, who later sold it in 1803. However his son John Swinton acquired Kimmerghame in 1850 from his aunt Mary Campbell of Blythswood. This older house was demolished and rebuilt in the early 1850s. William Burn had produced designs for a new house in 1825, although nothing was done at the time. The present house is dated 1851, and was designed by David Bryce. It incorporates interior panelling from the earlier house.

Kimmerghame was partially destroyed by fire in 1938, and subsequently only partly rebuilt. Until 2018, the laird was Major-General Sir John Swinton KCVO OBE, a former Lord Lieutenant of Berwickshire.

== Gallery ==
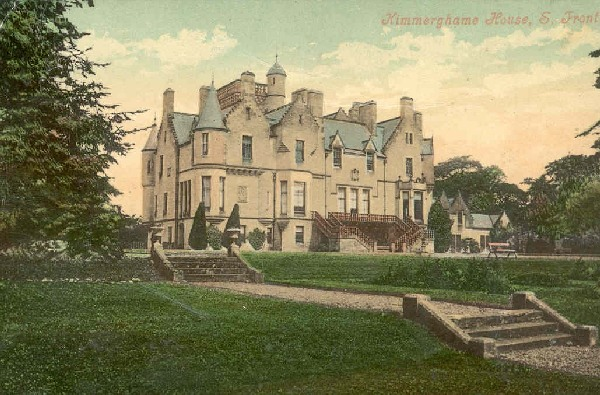
Kimmerghame House before the fire of 1938

== See also ==
- Kimmerghame House is also the name of a boys' boarding house at Fettes College, Edinburgh.
- List of places in the Scottish Borders
