= Stephane Custot =

French gallerist and art dealer

Stéphane Custot
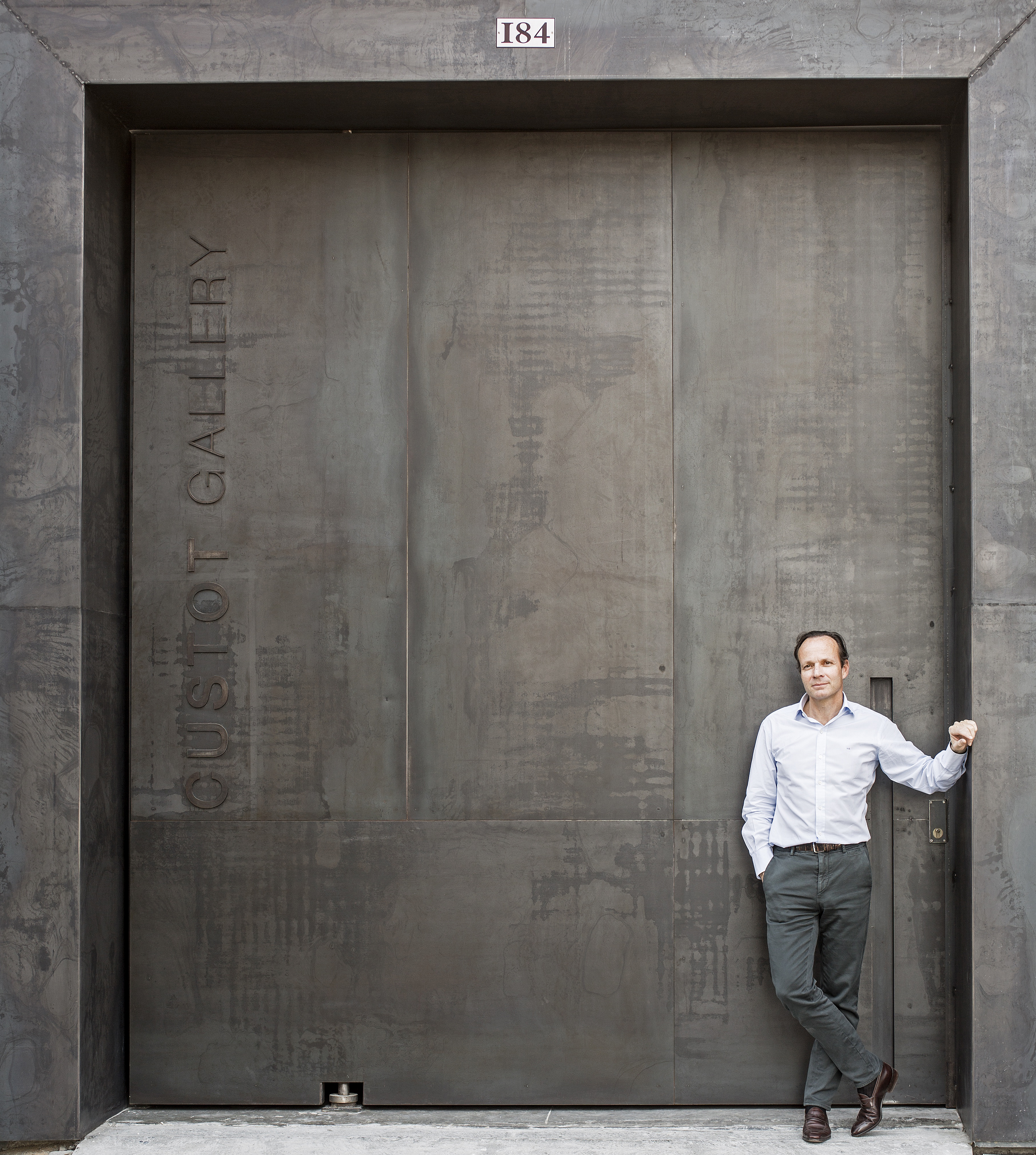
- Custot in 2016
- Born: 1962 or 1963 (age 61–62); Neuilly, Paris, France
- Education: Panthéon-Assas University; Sotheby's Institute of Art
- Occupation: Art dealer
- Spouse: Laurence Custot
- Children: 2

Stephane Custot (born 1963), is a French gallerist and art dealer. He is the owner of Waddington Custot gallery in London and Custot Gallery Dubai.

== Early life ==
Stephane Custot was born in Neuilly, Paris in 1963 (or 1962), the son of a society dentist and collector of Chinese art. He studied at Panthéon-Assas University between 1983 and 1985. In 1987, he joined the Sotheby's Institute of Art in London to study history of art for one year.

== Career ==
In 1984, he founded the Galerie Hopkins-Custot with Waring Hopkins in Paris, Avenue Matignon. While working at the gallery, in 1991, Custot joined forces with Patrick Perrin to create a new fair: the Salon du Dessin. In 1996, Custot and Patrick Perrin founded SOC (Cultural Organization Society) to support cultural and artistic projects.

In 1998, Emmanuel Moatti joined Custot and Perrin, and they opened the Salon des Beaux-Arts in Paris. This fair became the Pavillon des Antiquaires and Beaux-Arts first installed in the Eiffel-Branly space and then at the Tuileries Gardens.

In 2001, after 13 years, Custot became associate co-director at Galerie Hopkins. The gallery exhibits the work of artists including Pablo Picasso, Henri Matisse, Max Ernst and René Magritte, and contemporary artists such as Sam Szafran, Jedd Novatt and Marc Quinn.

In 2007, the Pavillon des Antiquaires and Beaux-Arts became PAD Paris (Pavilion of Arts and Design). The same year, Custot (who in the meantime moved to live in London in 2005) and Perrin exported PAD to London. Located in Hanover Square, the fair presents design pieces from the 1860s to the present day. The fair takes place at the same time as Frieze. In 2011, the fair was exported for the first time to New York from 10 to 14 November. 49 international galleries set up at Park Avenue Armory. A second edition was launched in 2012. However, the fair only had minor success.

=== Waddington Custot Galleries in London ===
Following the departure of Lord Bernstein, Custot bought the shares and became a partner of the Waddington Galleries which became Waddington Custot Galleries. The gallery is located at 11-12 Cork Street, Mayfair in London, and exhibits the work of British, European and American artists. On 30 November 2015, Leslie Waddington died. Custot then became the sole director of Waddington Custot Galleries. Custot brought new artists to the gallery as well as building on the Waddington legacy. He developed the publishing side of the business, producing the first monographs on Barry Flanagan and Jedd Novatt. In 2021, the gallery published the first book on Peter Blake’s work in collage. It was named in Wallpaper magazine's top ten art books for 2022.

=== Custot Gallery Dubai ===
In March 2016, Custot opened Custot Gallery Dubai in the district of Alserkal Avenue in Dubai. The gallery represents contemporary artists and participates in a few contemporary art fairs in the Middle East such as Art Abu Dhabi and Art Dubai.

== Distinctions ==
- Custot serves on the expert panel of the Compagnie Nationale des Experts (National Company of Experts) CNE.
- In July 2008, Custot awarded the Chevalier Medal of the Ordre des Arts et des Lettres (Order of Arts and Letters).
- In 2021, Custot was promoted to the rank of Officier de l'Ordre des Arts et des Lettres by the French Minister of Culture.

== Personal life ==
Custot is married to Laurence, a former banker, they have two children, and live in Kensington, London.
