= Carol Sutton (artist) =

American Canadian artist (born 1945)

- Born: Carol Lorraine Sutton; 3 September 1945; Norfolk, Virginia
- Died: February 26, 2025; Toronto Canada
- Known for: painter
- Spouse: André Fauteux

Carol Lorraine Sutton (3 September 1945 – 26 February 2025) was a multidisciplinary artist born in Norfolk, Virginia, U.S. who was living in Toronto, Ontario, Canada. She was a painter whose works on canvas and paper have been shown in 32 solo exhibits as well as being included in 94 group shows. Her work, which ranged from complete abstraction to the use of organic and architectural images, relates to the formalist ideas of Clement Greenberg and was noted for its use of color. Some of her paintings have been related to ontology.

== Early life and education ==
The daughter of Robert William Sutton, a designer and manufacturer of marine instruments and Nancy Chester Sustare, artist and homemaker, Carol spent her first six years living in a log cabin high on the sand dunes of Chesapeake Bay overlooking the Atlantic Ocean. She won a blue ribbon for her art in the Junior Section at the Sears-Allstate Tidewater Arts Festival. She received two Virginia Museum Fellowships and studied at Richmond Professional Institute (VCU) in Richmond, Virginia earning a BFA in 1967 along with a Gold Key and Art Achievement Award and a scholarship to attend the 'School of Visual Arts' in New York City.

Sutton received two teaching fellowships which allowed her to attend the University of North Carolina at Greensboro (UNCG), where her professors introduced her to the work of Morris Louis and Kenneth Noland. In 1969 she graduated with a Masters of Fine Art degree.

== Early career ==
In 1967, when Sutton was twenty-two, her work entered the Jacob Kainen Collection, of the Smithsonian Museum of American Art with a portfolio of sixteen serigraphs titled The Artist As A Young Woman - Picabia. Thinking that her artistic goals and the materials she used were similar to those of Eva Hesse, Will Insley, Sutton's professor at UNCG, introduced the two women in 1969 in his New York City loft. That year a large scale sculpture she created was purchased by 'Weatherspoon Art Gallery' of Greensboro, N.C.

Working on large sculpture in the isolation of her studio in Greensboro, North Carolina Sutton was offered a solo show of these works at The O.K. Harris Gallery in New York. However, she instead moved to Canada and married the sculptor André Fauteux with whom she had two children, Viva-Laura Sutton-Fauteux (1980-2016) and Yale Sutton-Fauteux.

While working in Canada, Sutton was awarded Ontario Arts Council grants in 1974, 1975, 1976, 1977, and 1979. She received a bursary and two travel grants from the Canada Council for the Arts between 1983 and 1992.

In Canada Sutton produced multiple exhibitions across Canada and showed with the Theo Waddington Galleries, Montreal, and later at Gallery One in Toronto. In Toronto, Sutton also did sculpture collaborations with contemporary electronic music composers. In Canada Sutton's work received positive reviews from critics Clement Greenberg and Karen Wilkin, and was influenced by the artists Anthony Caro and Helen Frankenthaler, all of whom regularly came to her Toronto studio. Fauteux introduced Sutton to Jack Bush in 1974 and both have been included in a number of exhibitions related to Bush's influence.

In 1977, Sutton presented her first Canadian exhibition at the A.C.T. Gallery. In 1978 Sutton held her first New York one-woman show at the William Edward O'Reilly Gallery. In the U.S.A. Sutton's work was noted by critic Kenworth Moffett, the Contemporary Curator of The Boston Museum of Fine Arts, who purchased her work 'Alvertie' for their collection and included her in the André Emmerich Gallery touring show, The New Generation: A Curator's Choice (1980).

Eight years after she left, Sutton returned to New York to show as an artist, this time as a painter not a sculptor. There she received an Adolph and Esther Gottlieb Foundation grant.

== Later career ==
Sutton became known for her large scale abstract acrylic paintings, which she painted with canvas laid directly on the floor. Her art has been linked by critics to the art movement called Lyrical Abstraction which is related to the tradition of Color Field Painting. Her smaller paper works often took on unusual structural forms and had widely extended edges, sometimes cut in wave shapes. She became known in the 1970s for her "fan" paintings and for her long horizontal pictures.

Sutton was encouraged by critic Michael Fried whom she met in 1986 at Triangle Artist Workshop. In 1987 Sutton was invited to participate in the Triangle Art Workshop in Barcelona, her third Triangle workshop. Two years later a Canada Council Grant allowed her to again travel to Europe to photograph and study ironwork throughout Spain and France. The experience resulted in a series of paintings titled 'The Spirit Balcony Paintings'. Roald Nasgaard, in Abstract Painting in Canada, writes of the artist: "Always a fluid and luscious painter of great gusto, comfortable with intimacy as well as the grand scale."

== Major group exhibitions ==
- 1968 Gallery of Contemporary Art, Winston-Salem, North Carolina, now called South Eastern Center for Contemporary Art - SECCA' -The Curator and Director then was Ted Potter: sculpture. Title: 'Five Pink Polyethylene Plastic Bags.
- 1969 "Art on Paper", Weatherspoon Art Gallery, Greensboro, North Carolina, U.S.A., November. Juror was Mr. Richard Bellamy, of New York City. (2 works, black paper 3' x 5 2/3" rolled, pinned & clipped with paper clips, 1969)
- 1969 "Montpelier Farm Stable Show of Eight Artists", Landover, Upper Marlboro, Maryland, October (sculpture of glass titled: 'Global March')
- 1976 "Olympiad XXI", Montreal, Quebec, (4 paintings)
- 1976 "Abstractions", Gallery-Straford, Stratford, Ontario, Canada; Canadian Cultural Centre, Paris, France; and Canada House, London, England ("Untitled :Tropical Series" painting, 1976)
- 1977 "New Abstract Art", Edmonton Art Gallery, Edmonton, Alberta, Canada
- 1978 "Certain Traditions: Recent British and Canadian Art" (paintings, Lockhaven, 1977, Bay Bridge, 1977, and Cove, 1977) Touring Canada & United Kingdom: Mostyn Gallery, Lhanducho, Wales, City Art Gallery, Aberdeen, Scotland, Herbert Art Gallery, Coventry, England, Commonwealth Institute, London, England
- 1978 "Carol Sutton and Thomas Downing", William Edward O'Reilly Inc., New York, New York, U.S.A
- 1980 "The Staff Collects - An Experiment" - Shell Canada, Harbourfront Art Gallery, Toronto, Ontario, Canada
- 1980 "Sutton, Saito, and Ross", Salander-O'Reilly Galleries Inc., New York, New York, U.S.A. ( paintings)
- 1980 "The New Generation: A Curator's Choice by Kenworth Moffett", Premiere- The Andre Emmerich Gallery, New York, New York, 4 to 27 September and then touring Europe in 1981 to; American Cultural Centre, Paris, France, Amerika House, Berlin, West Germany, Arzore Cooperative, Porto, Portugal, Sociedade Nacional de Belas Artes, Lisbon, Portugal
- 1981 to 1982 "The Heritage of Jack Bush: A Tribute", (paintings 'Raleigh Red', 1981 and 'Pink Float', 1979) In Canada: Robert McLaughlin Gallery, Oshawa, Ontario, Koffler Centre for the Arts, Willowdale, Ontario, Mendel Art Gallery, Saskatoon, Saskatchewan, Medicine Hat Museum, Medicine Hat, Alberta, Burlington Cultural Centre, Burlington, Ontario, Rodman Hall, St. Catharines, Ontario, Gallery - Stratford, Stratford, Ontario, Sir George Williams University, Montreal, Quebec
- 1981 Three Person Group Museum Show: "Keller Sutton and Saito", Edmonton Art Gallery, Edmonton, Alberta, ( "Fan Series" -including, 'Titan', 1981, 'Clarion', 1977, and 'Fruition', 1981)
- 1982 "Color II", paintings by John Griefen, Darryl Hughto, Carol Sutton, Dan Christensen, Kikuo Saito, Susan Roth, and Clifford Ross, Martha White Gallery, Louisville, Kentucky, U.S.A.(paintings - "Fan Series" -, 'Crossroads, 1981, and 'Umbrian Royal, 1982)
- 1982 "Selected Paintings of Contemporary Abstractionists", paintings by Carol Sutton, Ronnie Landfield, Darryl Hughto, Kikuo Saito, Larry Zox, Susan Roth, Tammany, Harman, and Sam Francis, (paintings - "Fan Series" -'Clay Roses', 1981, and 'Crystal Brown Royal', 1981)
- 1985 "The MBA (Boston) Hines Contemporary Art Collection", University Place at Harvard Square, Boston, Massachusetts, U.S.A.
- 1987 "V.I.P..........A Selection of Very Important Painters celebrating their work of the 80's", Gallery One, Toronto, Ontario, Canada, 29 November to 17 December, (paintings by: Stanley Boxer, Joseph Drapell, Friedel Dzubas, Sam Francis, Helen Frankenthaler, Doug Haynes, David Hockney, Katja Jacobs, Robert Motherwell, Kenneth Noland, Jules Olitski, Larry Poons, Frank Stella, and Carol Sutton)
- 1998, -"Abstraction Now", Selected by Karen Wilkin-, place: Gallery One, Toronto, Ontario, Canada, Featuring paintings by: Ann Clarke, Michele Drouin, Katja Jacobs, Harold Feist, Joseph Drapell, Douglas Haynes, Bill Kort, Bobby Tamo, Alice Teichert, and Carol Sutton. Lecture given by Karen Wilkin. Painting included was: 'Salient Balcony', 1990
- 1999/2000 - 'Abstraction- A Curator's Choice', The Art Gallery of Algoma, Sault Ste. Marie, Ontario, Canada. "Guest curator, Christiane Becker, was born in Cologne, Germany - Becker arrived at a list of five abstract painters: Joseph Drapell; Harold Feist; Paul Fournier; Carol Sutton; and, Jean McEwen."
- 2003, Grand Re-Opening Saturday April 12, 2003 - The Fitzwilliam Museum of Cambridge, United Kingdom, has loaned two paintings, Virginia Greens (1981) and Floral Tops (1986),
- 2007, The Sam & Adele Golden Foundation for the Arts, 10 Year Celebration & Art Auction Benefit, New Berlin, NY
- 2009, Bright Colours, Big Canvas: Jack Bush', at Agnes Etherington Art Centre, Queen's University, Kingston, Ontario, Canada, by Alicia Boutilier | Curator of Canadian Historical Art. Includes artists: David Bolduc, Paul Fournier, Milly Ristvedt, Alex Cameron, Dan Solomon, and K.M. Graham and Carol Sutton, with the painting: Mint Julep Nude. 1978

== Music commissions ==
- 1972 AUTOMATIC DUO by David Jaeger and James Montgomery
- 1973 FANCYE(^ Reference 11) by David Jaeger and Carol Sutton for Organ Toronto, Ontario, Canada and computer synthesized sound, moving sculpture, still sculpture and lights, for New Music Concerts, Concert Hall Organ - Inaugural Concerts, Edward Johnson Building, University of Toronto. Martin Liefhebber drawing of Fancye by Jaeger and Sutton

== Painting commissions ==
- 1987 THE EYE OF THE OVAL a painting apx. 8 feet by 18 feet for Orlando, Florida, USA Cineplex Odeon Corporation of Sand Lake Seven Cinemas

== Collections ==
- The Smithsonian Museum of American Art
- The Museum of Fine Arts Boston
- The Barcelona Museum of Contemporary Art (Museu d'Art Contemporani de Barcelona, or MACBA)
- The Fitzwilliam Museum of Cambridge, United Kingdom, The New Hall Art Collection
- The Art Gallery of Alberta, Edmonton, Alberta, Canada
- Agnes Etherington Art Centre Kingston, Ontario, Canada
- Canada Council Art Bank Ottawa, Ontario, Canada, Tuna, 1977 and Penny Royal 1977.
- Memorial University of Newfoundland Art Gallery Saint Johns, New Brunswick, Canada
- Art Gallery of Greater Victoria, (AGGV), Victoria, British Columbia, Canada

== Selected bibliography ==
- Karen Wilkin Certain Traditions: Recent British and Canadian Art, 1978
- Karen Wilkin Carol Sutton, ARTS Magazine, December 1979
- Kenworth Moffett The New Generation: A Curator's Choice, exhibition catalogue essay, illustrated, André Emmerich Gallery, New York
- Karen Wilkin Selections from The Westburne Collection, The Edmonton Art Gallery, catalogue 1982
- James Clark The Problem of Fundamental Ontology, Volume III, Limits Book Company, Toronto, Ontario, Canada, Published 1973
- Terry Fenton Feature Article: Canadians, Carol Sutton, Update, Volume 3, No. 1, January/February 1982, The Edmonton Art Gallery, Edmonton, Alberta, Canada
- David Burnett & Marilyn Schiff illustrated, Contemporary Canadian Art, Co-published by Hurtig & Art Gallery of Ontario
- Walter Darby Bannard- Carol Sutton's New Paintings- The Water Spiral Series, exhibition catalogue essay, Gallery One, Toronto, Ontario, Canada
- David Burnett Cineplex Odeon The First Ten Years- A Celebration of Contemporary Canadian Art, ISBN 0-9693835-0-9
- Donna Lypchuk Carol Sutton: Eye Of The Vortex, The Silhouette-Grill-Balcony Paintings, cover and feature article, Artpost 33, Summer, 1989
- Lypchuk, Donna, Exhibition essay 'A Spanner in The Works - Ethos and Spirituality in Abstract Painting' for show at Oakham House, Ryerson University, by Terrance Sulymko Fine Art, November 1990
- Reed Publishing Who's Who in American Art, 1990
- Sotheby's Important Canadian Art, Auction & exhibition catalogue, 31 May 1990, Toronto, ON
- International Biographical Centre International Who's Who of Intellectuals, 9th edition, Cambridge, England, Spring 1991
- R.R. Bowker Company, American Federation of Arts, Database Publishing Group - Art - 1990 -Who's Who in American Art, 1991–92
- *Murray, Joan (1999). Canadian Art in the Twentieth Century. Toronto: Dundurn. OCLC 260193722.
- Landfield, Ronnie, NewYorkArtWorld.com, The Whitney Museum Ends the American Century, The American Century: Art and Culture - Part 2, 1950 – 2000, The Whitney Museum of American Art, 26 September 1999 – 13 February 2000, by Ronnie Landfield© 1999
- McGowan, Alison C (Editor), Who's Who in American Art-2004
- Roald Nasgaard, Abstract Painting in Canada, (soft-back) Publisher: Douglas & McIntyre, ISBN 978-1-55365-226-7
