= Victor Waddington =

Victor Waddington (1907 - 1981) was a British art dealer, active in Dublin and then London, an early advocate for the work of Jack Yeats and Henri Hayden. He was the father of fellow art dealers, Leslie and Theo Waddington.

== Career ==
He started the Victor Waddington Galleries at 8 South Anne Street, Dublin in 1927, having moved there from London. The gallery exhibited modernist and avant-garde work from Irish, British, and European artists. Other artists that were featured included Yvonne Jammet, Seán Keating, and Moyra Barry. Waddington is regarded as one of the main art dealers of the early years of the Irish Free State. In 1943 he became sole dealer and business manager for Jack Yeats and was crucial for his career and reputation.

He founded Waddington Galleries and the Victor Waddington Gallery on London's Cork Street. In 1966, his son Leslie Waddington established a new gallery at the former property with the backing of Alex Bernstein, a member of the Granada media dynasty, having previously worked with Victor.

== Personal life ==
He is the father of Leslie and Theo Waddington, both also art dealers.
