= Waddington Custot =

Art gallery in London, England

Coordinates: 51.5101°N 0.1415°W

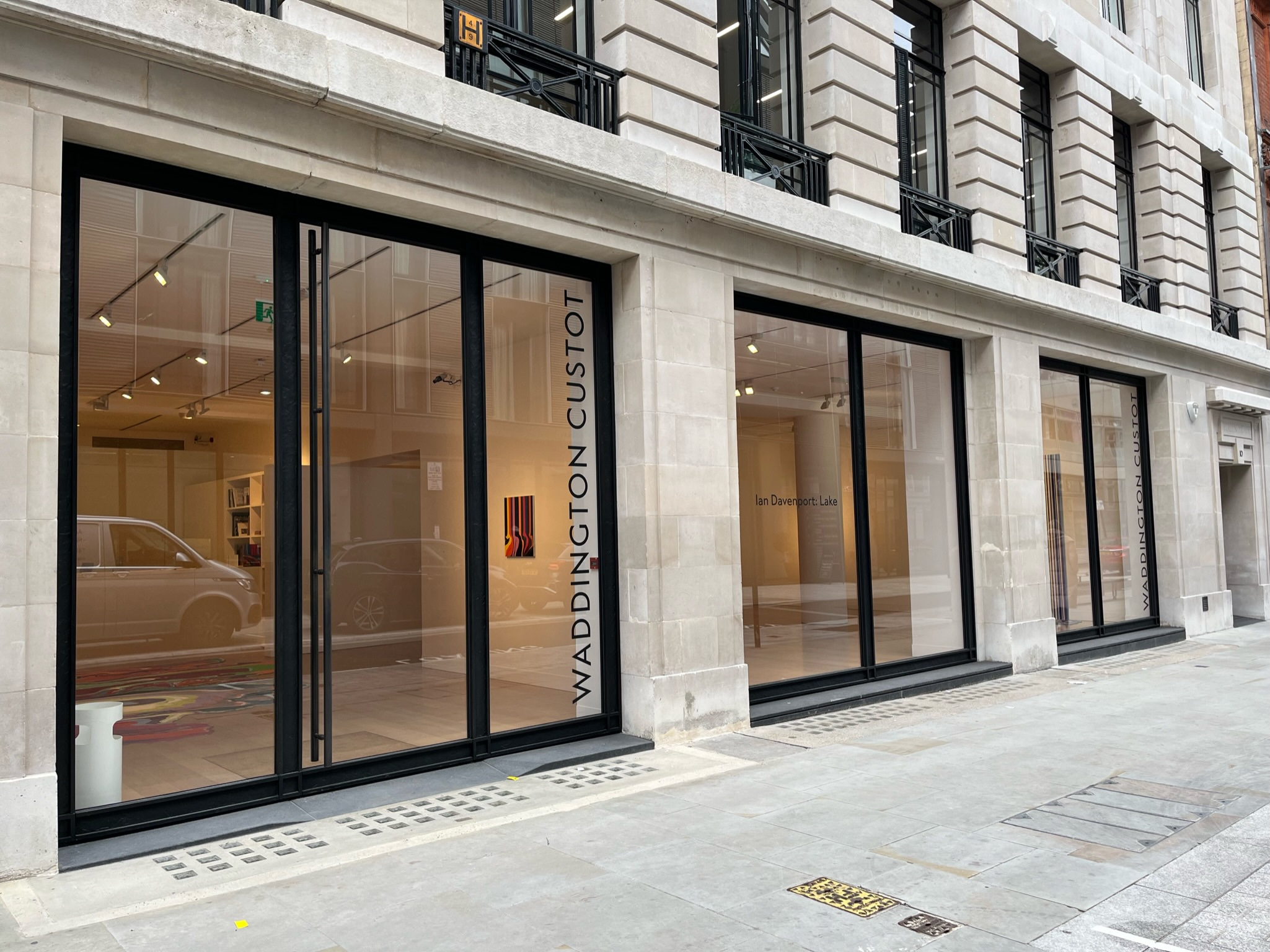
- Established: 1966
- Location: Cork Street, Mayfair, London
- Type: Art gallery, modern art, contemporary art
- Founders: Leslie Waddington; Stephane Custot
- Website: www.waddingtoncustot.com

Waddington Custot is a London-based art gallery specialising in modern and contemporary art. Formerly known as Waddington Galleries, it has been situated on Mayfair's Cork Street since 1958.

== History ==
Waddington Galleries was founded in 1958 by Victor Waddington (1907–1981), a London-born, Dublin-based art dealer. He was joined by his son Leslie Waddington at the gallery on Cork Street, in London's Mayfair. In 1966, Leslie established his own business under the Waddington Galleries name. He had the backing of Alex Bernstein, of the Granada Group and later Chairman of Granada Television.

After Lord Bernstein died in 2010, his shares were sold to London-based French art dealer, Stephane Custot and the gallery was renamed Waddington Custot Galleries.

Leslie Waddington died on 30 November 2015, leaving Custot as the sole director of Waddington Custot.

== Location timeline ==
Waddington Custot is currently found at 11–12 Cork Street. It has occupied various addresses on the Mayfair road in its history, making the Waddington name almost synonymous with Cork Street.

Waddington Galleries first opened in March 1958 at 2 Cork Street. The second gallery opened in February 1965 at 25 Cork Street, which sat opposite No. 2. Victor Waddington followed to this new address in 1966, setting up his own Victor Waddington gallery, leaving Leslie heading Waddington Galleries at No. 2.

In November 1968, Leslie opened the Leslie Waddington Gallery around the corner, on 8 Vigo Street. This new gallery specialised in prints and later returned to Cork Street, at No. 31 as Waddington Graphics, eventually closing in January 1995.

Two additional galleries were opened at 23 Cork Street in December 1969. These were known as Waddington Galleries II and III with No. 2 being known as Waddington Galleries I.

In 1982, a fourth gallery was opened at 4 Cork Street, which hosted exhibitions until the end of 1983. The main gallery then moved to 11 Cork Street, which was a new build designed by British architect John Pawson. By the end of the 80s, a further two Waddington galleries had opened at 5 and 12 Cork Street. All galleries eventually closed, aside from the main space.

By the end of the 90s, Waddington Galleries was consolidated at 11-12 Cork Street, merging the two galleries into one large exhibition space.

== Exhibitions ==
Waddington Galleries opened in 1958 with an exhibition of works by the late Jack B. Yeats, who had been represented by Victor Waddington in Ireland. The gallery continued to exhibit Yeats' pieces, as well as smaller works of artists from the School of Paris, like Henri Matisse and Pablo Picasso.

Waddington Galleries introduced the works of emerging British talent, specifically with St Ives artists, including Patrick Heron, Terry Frost, and Roger Hilton. After introducing additional British painters and sculptors such as Ivon Hitchens, Elisabeth Frink, and William Turnbull, the gallery became known for championing British contemporary art.

Following the opening of the Victor Waddington gallery in 1966, Leslie Waddington increased the scope of contemporary British artists. Artists featured in Bryan Robertson's New Generation exhibitions —which were held at the Whitechapel Gallery in the mid-60s - were particular favourites, with artists such as David Annesley and Michael Bolus being featured at Waddington.

The gallery also promoted post-war American art in Britain, upon being renamed Waddington Galleries I. From 1969, and throughout the 1970s, American color field painters such as Morris Louis, Kenneth Noland, and Jules Olitski were exhibited.

== Current artists ==
Waddington Custot represents a number of British and international artists, including Peter Blake, credited with designing the sleeve for The Beatles' album Sgt. Peppers Lonely Hearts Club Band, Ian Davenport and French painter Fabienne Verdier.

Artists represented include:

- David Annesley
- Peter Blake
- Patrick Caulfield
- Allan D'Arcangelo
- Ian Davenport
- Barry Flanagan
- Robert Indiana
- Sol LeWitt
- Joan Miró
- Robert Rauschenberg
- Sophia Vari
- Bernar Venet
- Fabienne Verdier
