= Toby Mott =

British artist and designer (born 1964)

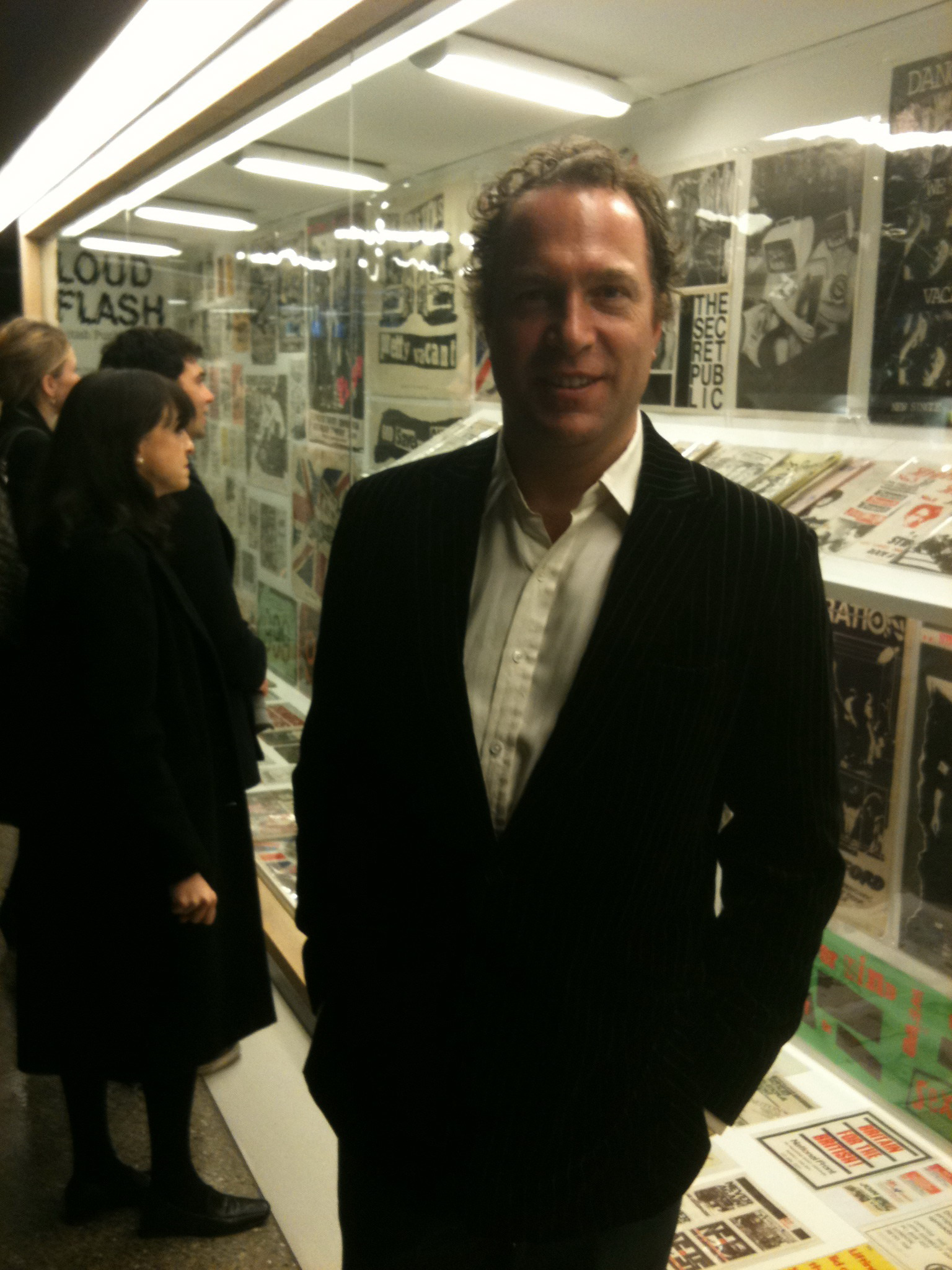
- Born: 12 January 1964 (age 62); London, England
- Education: Westminster Kingsway College
- Occupations: Artist; designer; collector
- Known for: Visual art; fashion design; punk archiving

Toby Victor Mott (born 12 January 1964) is a British artist, designer, and sometime Punk historian recognised for co-founding the Grey Organisation, a 1980s artists' collective, and for creating the fashion brand Toby Pimlico. His Mott Collection, which holds more than 1,000 punk rock posters, flyers, and fanzines, has brought him renewed attention.

== Early life ==
Toby Mott was born in London, son of academic Jim Mott and social worker Pam.

He later studied art at Westminster Kingsway College where Sid Vicious of the Sex Pistols was an alumnus. Mott was a founder member of the ASA (Anarchist Street Army, a late 1970s organisation that caused disturbances in the Pimlico area of London).

Mott lived at the Carburton Street squats in Fitzrovia during the early 1980s, sharing the space with Boy George, Marilyn, Cerith Wyn Evans, Fiona Russell-Powell, and Mark Lebon. He appeared in several Derek Jarman films from this era, including The Angelic Conversation and also appearing in Gilbert & George's "Exister" pieces from 1984, currently in the Tate Collection.

In the late 1980s and early 1990s he was based in New York and Los Angeles working part-time as a bicycle messenger and as an art director for MTV making music videos for various groups, among them Public Enemy, A Tribe called Quest and The Rolling Stones. In 1989, Mott designed album cover graphics for groups such as Information Society and De La Soul, most notably their debut album 3 Feet High and Rising.

=== Anarchist Street Army ===
The Anarchist Street Army (ASA) was a loose collective of young punks and anarchists from several inner city London Schools including Pimlico Comprehensive, London Nautical School, and Camden School for Girls, who congregated around an independent record shop on Wilton Road called Recordsville and attended Crass concerts. Their motives as an organisation were varied, but had a general ethos of bringing anarchy and chaos to the London streets, such as crashing Capital Radio's Nicky Horne show in an attempt to save the Roxy, and were a forerunner to later organisations with similar attitudes such as Class War, The Wombles, and protest tactics like Black Bloc. The ASA's motto and anthem was 'Running Riot', a punk rock song by the band Cock Sparrer.

== Solo art career ==
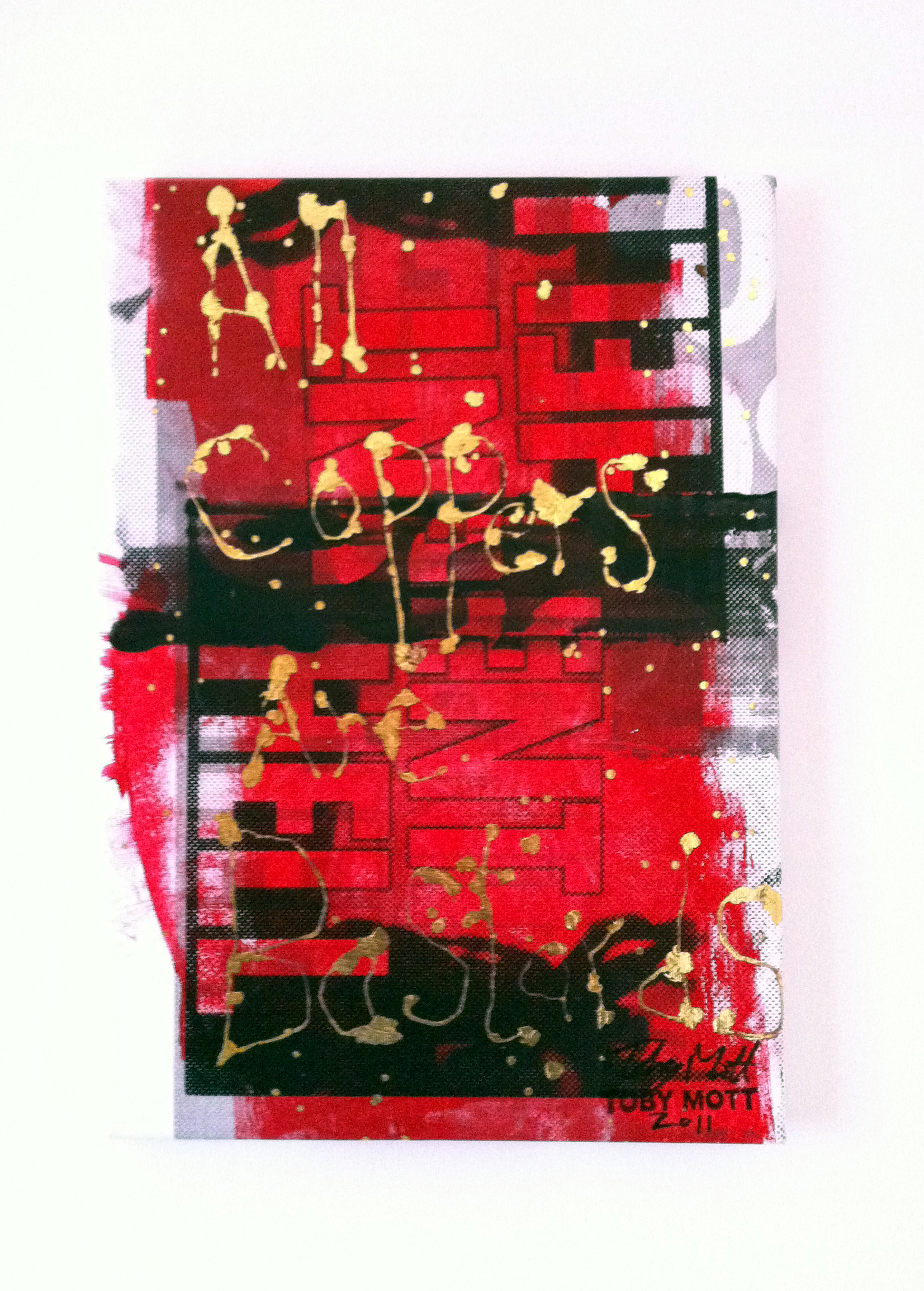
"All Coppers Are Bastards" painting from Mott's 2011 gallery based on the 2011 England riots.

Mott co-founded the art group Grey Organisation. In January 1985, they staged an act of "art terrorism" by secretly placing one of their paintings in London's International Contemporary Arts Fair. A year later, they threw grey paint on gallery windows along Cork Street, London's art district hub. Members were arrested and temporarily barred from central London, prompting a move to New York City, where they showed work at the Civilian Warfare Gallery in the East Village. After GO ended in 1991, Mott worked independently, exhibiting at White Columns in New York, the Thomas Soloman Garage in Los Angeles, and Interim Art in London. The Maureen Paley gallery represented him for years.

In September 2011, Mott produced a series of paintings inspired by the 2011 England riots, the resulting exhibition 'Unrest' was exhibited at Vegas Gallery, London. Many of the paintings in the exhibition were brandished with the slogan 'All Coppers Are Bastards' in gold leaf a reference to the legendary punk/political slogan.

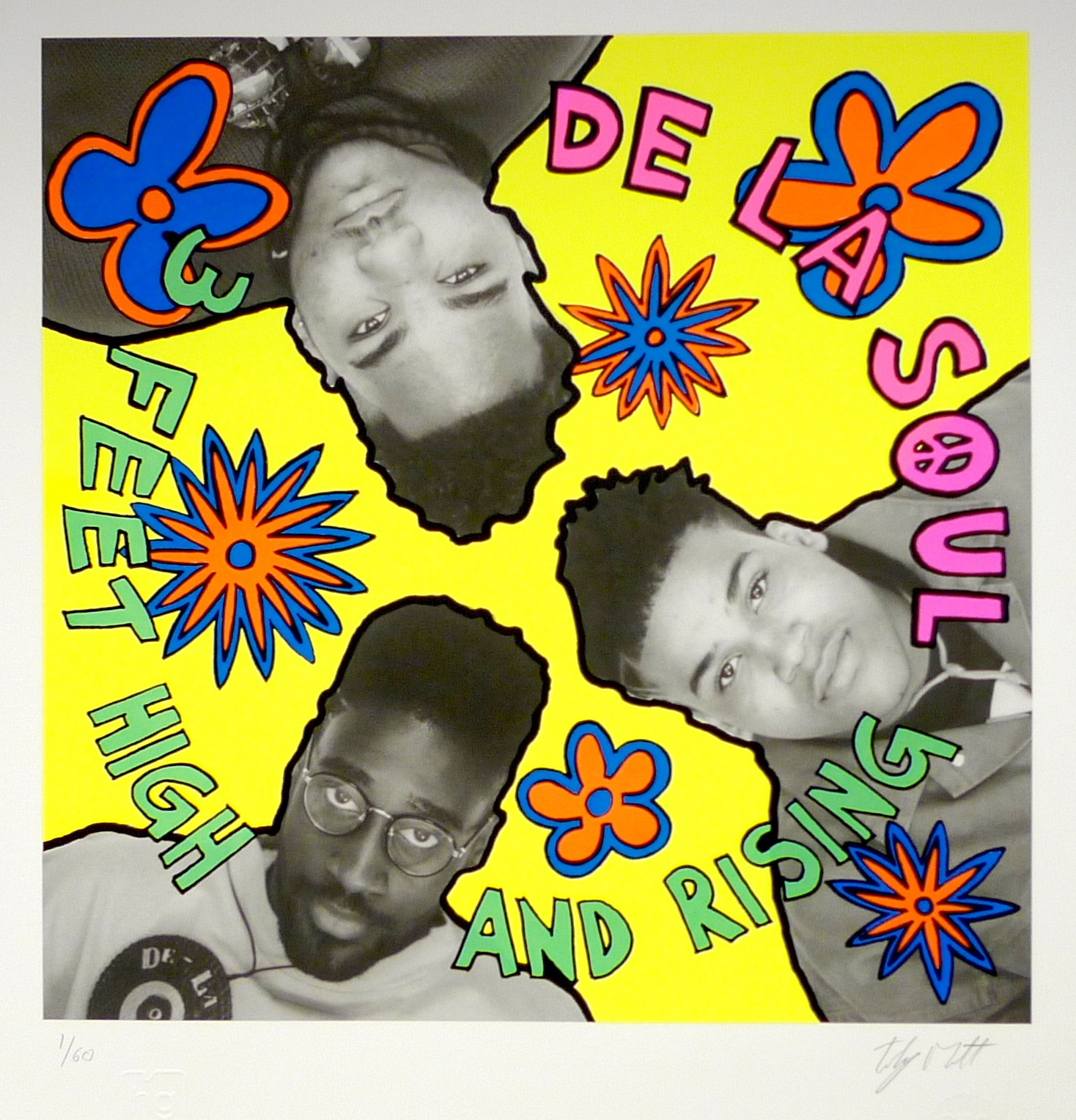
De La Soul's 3 Feet High and Rising album artwork, Giclée print

Mott said of this exhibition "I was going to call the exhibition, 'I'll keep looting until I get caught'— a quote from a looter but which could equally apply to a banker, [T]hose at the bottom are taking their lead from those at the top; although the rioters act in a cruder way, it is essentially the same thing."

In October 2011, Knightsbridge gallery New Contemporary presented a solo exhibition of Mott's paintings, titled 'This Means Everything'. "The show is comprised of collection of new paintings addressing our culture's present preoccupation with fame and success versus the historical background of nihilism and anarchy as epitomised by the punk movement."

In 2013, Toby Mott exhibited a print edition of the original album artwork for De La Soul's 3 Feet High and Rising, displayed alongside memorabilia such as Mott's original sketch, his gold disc, and other items from his private collection. Mott wrote an essay meant to accompany the exhibition in which he described the creation of the 1989 album art. He was commissioned to design the album cover by Tommy Boy Records and invited De La Soul to his New York loft. Atop a stepladder, he took the now-iconic black and white photograph of the three and added the dayglo "daisy-age" art in post-production.

== The Mott Collection ==
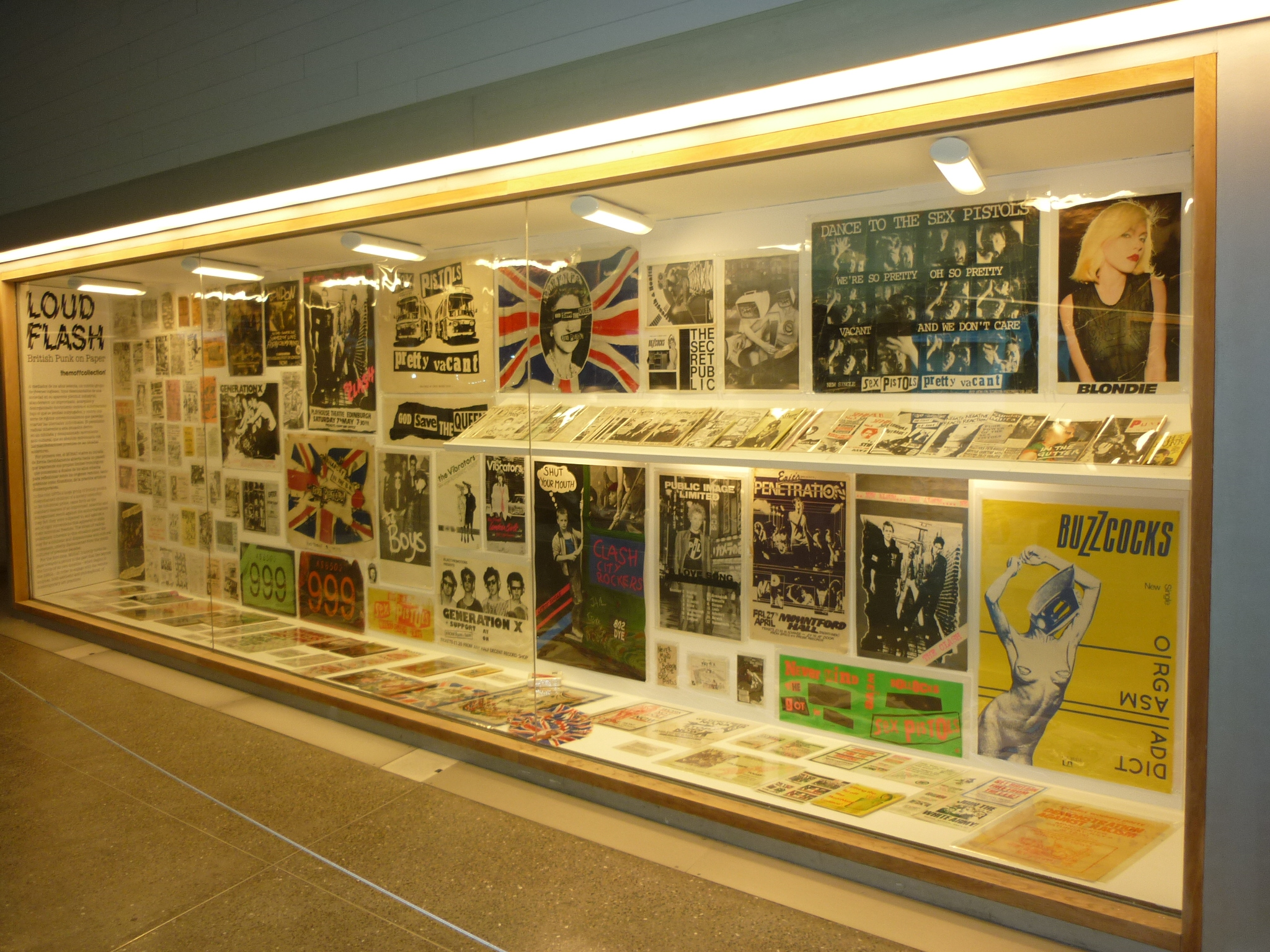
Installation shot of Punk on Paper.

Mott began his collection in the late 1970s. In addition to the iconic works of the era, notably those produced by Jamie Reid for The Sex Pistols and Linder Sterling for the Buzzcocks, it includes propaganda from political groups such as Rock Against Racism and the British National Front and memorabilia from the Silver Jubilee of Elizabeth II, an event that collided with punk's high-water mark in 1977. Esopus released material from the Mott Collection related to Margaret Thatcher in 2013. The special edition publication included several facsimile reproductions of archival materials and a removable insert commemorating Thatcher's polarising tenure.

Exhibitions and books from the Mott Collection include:

- Loud Flash: British Punk on Paper, MUSAC, Museo de Arte Contemporáneo de Castilla y León, March 2010 accompanied by the publication, Loud Flash: British Punk on Paper ISBN 978-84-92572-17-5, a selection of posters and essays designed by cult designer Scott King.
- Loud Flash: British Punk on Paper, Haunch of Venison, London, 2010 accompanied by the publication, Loud Flash: British Punk on Paper ISBN 978-1-905620-54-8 produced by Haunch of Venison. On the occasion of the exhibition at Haunch of Venison a Panel discussion took place on the subject of the enduring legacy of Punk, Moderated by Mark Ingelfield, Gallery Director, panel members: Tony D, editor of Ripped and Torn fanzine, Ray Gange, star of The Clash film Rude Boy, Toby Mott, artist, writer and collector; Teal Triggs, author of the Thames & Hudson book Fanzines, Peter York, style writer and author of The Official Sloane Ranger Handbook.
- Crass, Andrew Roth Gallery, New York, February 2011, accompanied by the publication: Crass 1977 – 1984, PPP Editions, 2011
- Loud Flash: British Punk on Paper, Honor Fraser, Los Angeles, July 2011 accompanied by the publication: Loud Flash: British Punk on Paper at Honor Fraser, designed by Brian Roettinger.

On the occasion of the exhibition at Honor Fraser a panel discussion took place moderated by Professor Vivien Goldman of the NYU Tisch School of the Arts, panel members: Gardar Eide Einarsson, Artist, Billy Idol, Punk Musician, Toby Mott, artist, writer and collector, Simon Reynolds, British author and music journalist.

- We Have Our Own Concept of Time and Motion, Auto Italia South East, London, 25–28 Aug
- Nothing in the World But Youth, Selections from the Mott Collection: Thatcher's youth, Turner Contemporary, Margate, 17 September 2011 – 8 January 2012 accompanied by the publication: Nothing in the World But Youth, ISBN 978-0-9552363-3-4
- We Are the Writing on the Wall, MoMA PS1: NY Art Book Fair, New York City, 30 September – 2 October accompanied by the publication: 100 Fanzines/10 Years of British Punk – 1976–1985, PPP Editions ISBN 978-0-9826431-0-5 On the occasion of the exhibition at MoMA PS1 a panel discussion took place on the history of British punk fanzines, moderated by Professor Vivien Goldman of the NYU Tisch School of the Arts, Toby Mott, artist, writer and collector, Joly MacFie, fanzine publisher, Victor Brand writer, Michael Gonzales afro-punk music writer.
- Jubilee 2012 – Sixty Punk Singles, The Vinyl Factory, London, 30 May – 24 June 2012.

Accompanied by the exhibition catalogue: Jubilee 2012 – Sixty Punk Singles, designed and printed by Ditto Press, ISBN 978-1-84321-996-5

- KRAFTWERK. 45 rpm, The Vinyl Factory, London, 13 Sep – 5 October 2012.

An exhibition of forty-five 7-inch single covers by the German krautrock group Kraftwerk, many designed by Emil Schult. Accompanied by the exhibition catalogue KRAFTWERK. 45 rpm, designed and printed by Ditto Press, ISBN 978-0-9573914-0-6 In the catalogue's introductory essay 'Kraftwerk, Yesterday's Tomorrow', Mott describes the group's aesthetic as "an analogue past dreaming of today's digital present."

- David Bowie – Nacht Musik, The Vinyl Factory, London, 7 Feb – 3 March 2013.

An exhibition of forty-five 7-inch single covers by David Bowie, from his Berlin period. Accompanied by the exhibition catalogue David Bowie – Nacht Musik, designed and printed by Ditto Press

- American Hardcore 1978 – 1990, Vinyl Factory, London, 11 April – 4 May 2013.

An exhibition of fifty 7-inch single covers by various American Hardcore Punk bands such as Black Flag, JFA, Bad Brains, & The Dicks, among others. Accompanied by the exhibition catalogue American Hardcore 1978 – 1990, designed and printed by Ditto Press, ISBN 978-0-9573914-2-0

- SKINHEAD – AN ARCHIVE, published 2014 by Ditto and The Mott Collection

A publication exploring one of the most controversial and radical subcultures. With printed material curated by Mott, the book examines this multifaceted culture through the lens of zines, posters, and films. The book is divided into sub-sections looking at the original iteration of skinhead, the fascist interpretation, the socialist counterpoint, queer skinhead culture, exploitation literature, skin girls, and everything in between. ISBN 978-0-9567952-7-4

- Showboat: Punk / Sex / Bodies (Dashwood Books – ISBN 978-0-9966574-0-2) – Showboat is a collection published by Mott in 2016, exploring the relationship between punk and sex. Numerous people contributed to the book including Paul Cook of the Sex Pistols, Garry Bushell, filmmaker Nick Zedd, and artist Annie Sprinkle. In addition to photo galleries, the book has personal essays and lyrics from 1972 to 2016. The collection also contains never before exhibited images by Shirley Baker from the 1980s.
- Oh So Pretty: Punk in Print 1976-1980 (Phaidon Press – ISBN 978-0-7148-7275-9) – In late 2016, Mott published Punk in Print, a collection of flyers, ticket stubs, and other memorabilia showing the early days of punk. The New York Observer stated the book was, "collectively, the raw, abrasive look of the promotional material from the music scene back then packs a powerful punch, presented with the immediacy of youthful creativity in an instinctive way." The book was originally published in 2015 as Punk in Print 1976-1980.

=== Crass exhibition ===
New York's Andrew Roth Gallery hosted another part of Mott's collection, "Crass, selections from The Mott Collection", in February 2011. The exhibition of objects and artefacts centred on the anarchic, post-punk culture of the British band Crass included the band's LPs, EPs, and a full collection of the band's zine, Inter-National Anthem.

=== Jubilee exhibition ===
To celebrate the Diamond Jubilee of Queen Elizabeth II, the Mott Collection exhibited a collection of sixty 7" punk singles, including records by The Clash, Ian Dury, The Cortinas, and the Buzzcocks, among others. The exhibition was accompanied by a publication of the same name reproducing various groups' cover artwork, including the iconic "God Save the Queen" by the Sex Pistols. In an interview with Peter Aspden in the Financial Times, Mott discusses how the Queen became an icon of the punk movement after the Sex Pistols defaced Cecil Beaton's portrait of her with a safety pin.

"I was playing some of the records yesterday," said Mott. "They are amazing. They are so musical. They are like pop. I can't believe my parents said they were nothing but noise. Really, it is something you would want your own kids to be doing, it was so creative, instead of all this consumer stuff and video games. Punk was portrayed as this negative thing but, in fact, it was a high point and a lasting part of British culture. And that is why we should be celebrating it. Punk marked the end of the postwar period. It gave birth to individualism and then the Thatcher era that followed."

=== Skinhead culture ===
In 2013, Mott curated an exhibition called "Where Have All The Bootboys Gone? Skinhead Style and Graphic Subculture." The exhibition was held at the London College of Communication. It was said to be an exploration of the Skinhead subculture, its ties to the punk movement and Oi!, and the aesthetics and politics therein. Mott was criticized for opening the exhibit during Black History Month. Still, he defended his position, saying, "I don't understand the objection. I thought everyone loves skinheads. They are as British as chicken korma."

In March 2014, Mott participated in London's Jewish Book Week. He spoke on a panel on the Jewish roots of punk alongside Geoff Travis, Daniel Miller, Charles Shaar Murray, and Vivien Goldman.

=== Cultural Traffic ===
Mott launched a counter-culture book fair called Cultural Traffic. It launched at Truman's Brewery in Shoreditch in 2016. The fair showcases affordable art that is engaged in current social and political issues. The debut collection showcased works from contributors such as Angel Rose, Skin Deep, William Ling Fine Art, and The Photocopy Club.

== Toby Pimlico ==
Toby Pimlico is a fashion label based on paintings by Toby Mott. Mott began making paintings based on detention school 'lines' such as "I Will Try Harder"; these were then transferred onto T-shirts, transforming them into a recognisable design motif. He came up with the brand name, Toby Pimlico, and an initial six designs, including "I Must Not Chase the Boys" and "I Have Nothing To Wear". The T-shirts began to have a cult following after being worn by Kate Moss, the actress Sienna Miller, Geri Halliwell from The Spice Girls and It Girl Tara Palmer-Tomkinson. The label also received praise from the Prince of Wales.

Other slogans are used to promote social consciousness, such as the Marie Curie-inspired 'love you to death.'

The label was launched at London Fashion Week in 1998.

The Brand now includes a range of tea towels, maternity wear and knickers.

Mott responded to his own success and transition from Punk to artist-businessman by calling himself a 'Gold Card Anarchist'

In 2014, Mott launched the website TobyShop.com to promote the brand. He released a line of vintage slogan T-shirts for the Toby Shop. The design is similar to T-shirts he first created in 1999, but with a modern twist. The line of shirts features slogans like "Show Me The Moet" and "Saturday Girl."

== Personal life ==
Mott divorced celebrity hairdresser Louise Galvin in 2008 after one year of marriage, as reported in the Evening Standard. Mott met Galvin through a mutual friend; she was already several months pregnant when they married. "The marriage was never going to work, I discovered Louise had matching Louis Vuitton luggage" says Mott.

Their daughter was born in 2007.
