= Leslie Waddington =

British art dealer

- Born: 9 February 1934
- Died: 30 November 2015 (aged 81)
- Education: Portora Royal School; École du Louvre
- Occupation: Art dealer
- Spouses: Ferriel Lyle (m. 1967; div. 1983) Clodagh Frances Fanshawe (m. 1985)
- Children: 2 daughters (with Lyle)
- Parent: Victor Waddington
- Relatives: Theo Waddington (brother)

Leslie Waddington (9 February 1934 – 30 November 2015) was a British art dealer who served as the chairman of Waddington Custot Galleries, 11 Cork Street, London.

== Early life and education ==
Waddington was born on 9 February 1934. He was the son of Victor Waddington and his wife, Zelda Waddington (née Levine).

He was educated at Portora Royal School in Enniskillen, Northern Ireland, and the École du Louvre, Paris His brother, Theo, is also an art dealer.

== Career ==
In 1966, started his own gallery in London's Cork Street, Leslie Waddington had the backing of Alex Bernstein, a member of the Granada media dynasty.

In 2011, Waddington Galleries became Waddington Custot Galleries. Lord Bernstein died in 2010, and the 50% of the shares they owned were sold to the London-based French art dealer Stephane Custot.

In 2013, Sir Nicholas Serota, Director of the Tate Gallery presented Waddington with the Federation of European Art Galleries Association lifetime achievement award "for his efforts in creating and directing an exemplary gallery of high international standing." He died on 30 November 2015, aged 81.

== Personal life ==
In 1967, Waddington married Ferriel Lyle, they had two daughters and divorced in 1983. In 1985, he married Clodagh Frances Fanshawe. He was godfather to Allegra Huston.
