= Grey Organisation =

The Grey Organisation
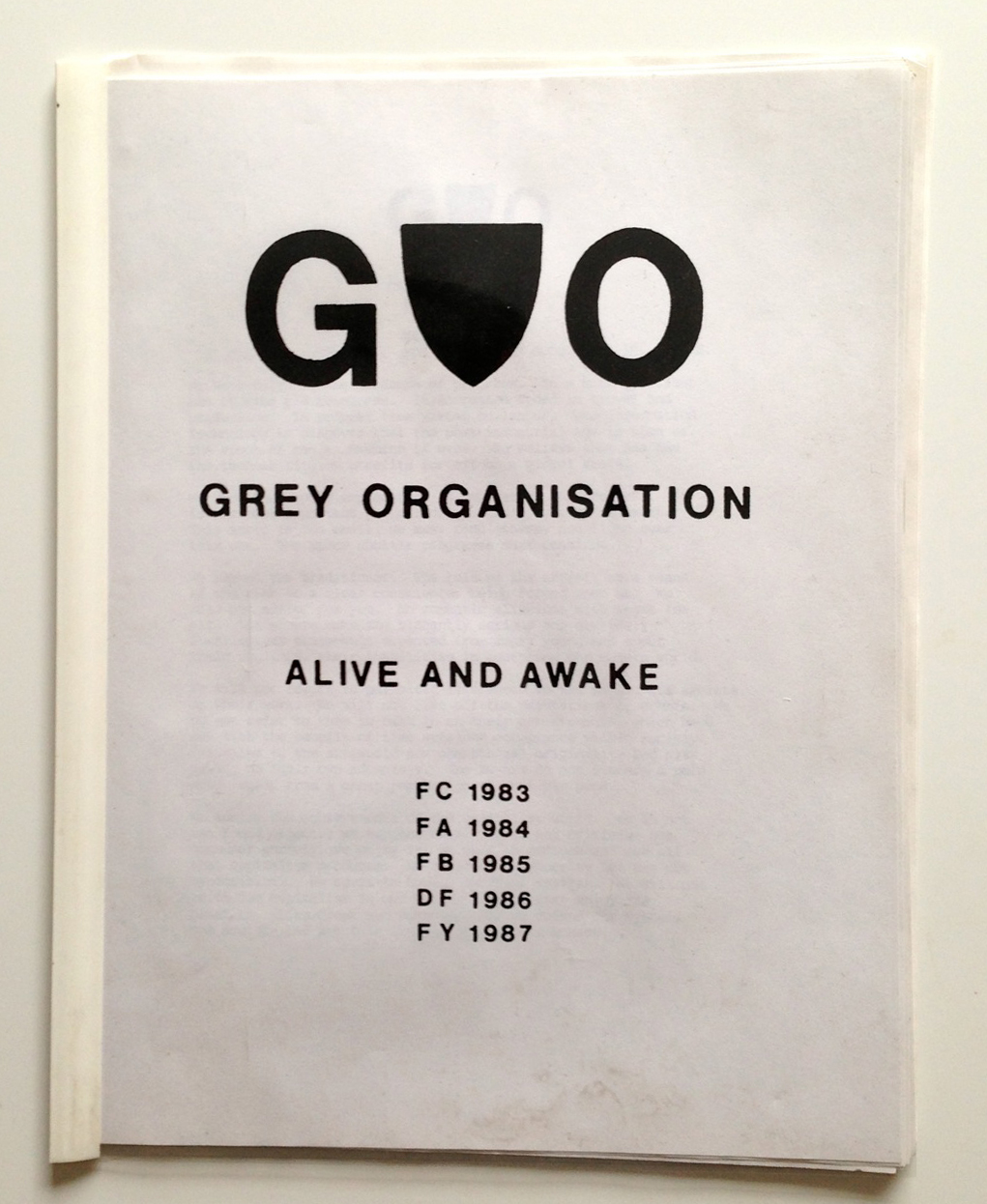
- GO manifesto with logo
- Known for: Direct Action, Video, Painting

The Grey Organisation (GO) was an artist collective active from 1983 to 1991. GO worked in several media including film and video and participated in over 20 international exhibitions. In January 1985 the group committed an act of 'art terrorism' by smuggling one of its paintings into the International Contemporary Arts Fair in London. The following year it mounted an attack on Cork Street, then the centre of the London art world, splashing grey paint on the windows of a number of galleries. After this, members of the group were arrested and for a time banned from central London. This resulted in them relocating to New York City where they exhibited at The Civilian Warfare Gallery in the East Village. The members of the group were Toby Mott, Daniel Saccoccio, Tim Burke and Paul Spencer. Their activities and attitude towards the traditional British art establishment greatly influenced The Young British Artists from 1988 onwards.

== Biography ==
After moving to Bow in East London, Toby Mott and childhood friends Daniel Saccoccio, Tim Burke and Paul Spencer formed Grey Organisation in 1982 as a response to the "prevailing Thatcherite free market consumerist culture". GO's origins can be found in the Punk movement and 1970s youth politics, the quartet having been members of the Anarchist Street Army. They eschewed the more common anarcho-aesthetic opting instead to dress uniformly in grey suits, with heads shaved in a parody of yuppie and Soviet "corporate monoculture".

On 28 July 1984, GO organised a live concert for Psychic TV. It took place in a derelict circular building in Drayton Park, London and was recorded live and released as Temporary Temple. The same year, GO directed the film Grey Moments.

In 1985, GO began a series of direct art-actions; launching attacks on the International Contemporary Arts Fair in London by sneaking paintings into the fair; and an attack on Cork Street covering some of London’s most famous galleries in grey paint "arguably something inherited from the strategies of disobedience of May '68 Paris, culled from the heroism of Guy Debord". In a press release GO justified the attacks on Cork Street, describing the galleries established there as "boring and lifeless" and stating they "intended to liven up their lives a bit!". The attack took place on Tuesday 21 May 1985, somewhere between midnight and 6am. Members of the Grey Organisation were later arrested, released on bail and banned from central London, but when prosecuted at Well Street Magistrates' court, pleaded 'Not Guilty' and were released without charge. Subsequently, in 1986, GO moved to New York to escape further attempts at prosecution.

In 1986, GO took part in the exhibition Money organised by J. S. G. Boggs, the notorious banknote-copying artist, at the Young Unknowns Gallery. The exhibition was raided by police and works, including those by GO, were confiscated.

"In the England of the 1980s, there were others creating their own vision reacting to the prevailing Thatcherite free market consumerist culture. Psychic Youth, Test Department. Laibach. My own involvement was with the art, filmmaking group the Grey Organization. We parodied yuppie and Soviet corporate monoculture with our uniformed anonymity, shaved heads, white shirts, English suits, making and exhibiting art as product without individual authorship, something inspired from the rigorous orthodoxy of Crass". From the essay 'Crass, an education' by Toby Mott, Crass 1977–1984, PPP Editions, 2011.

== Fashion and PR ==
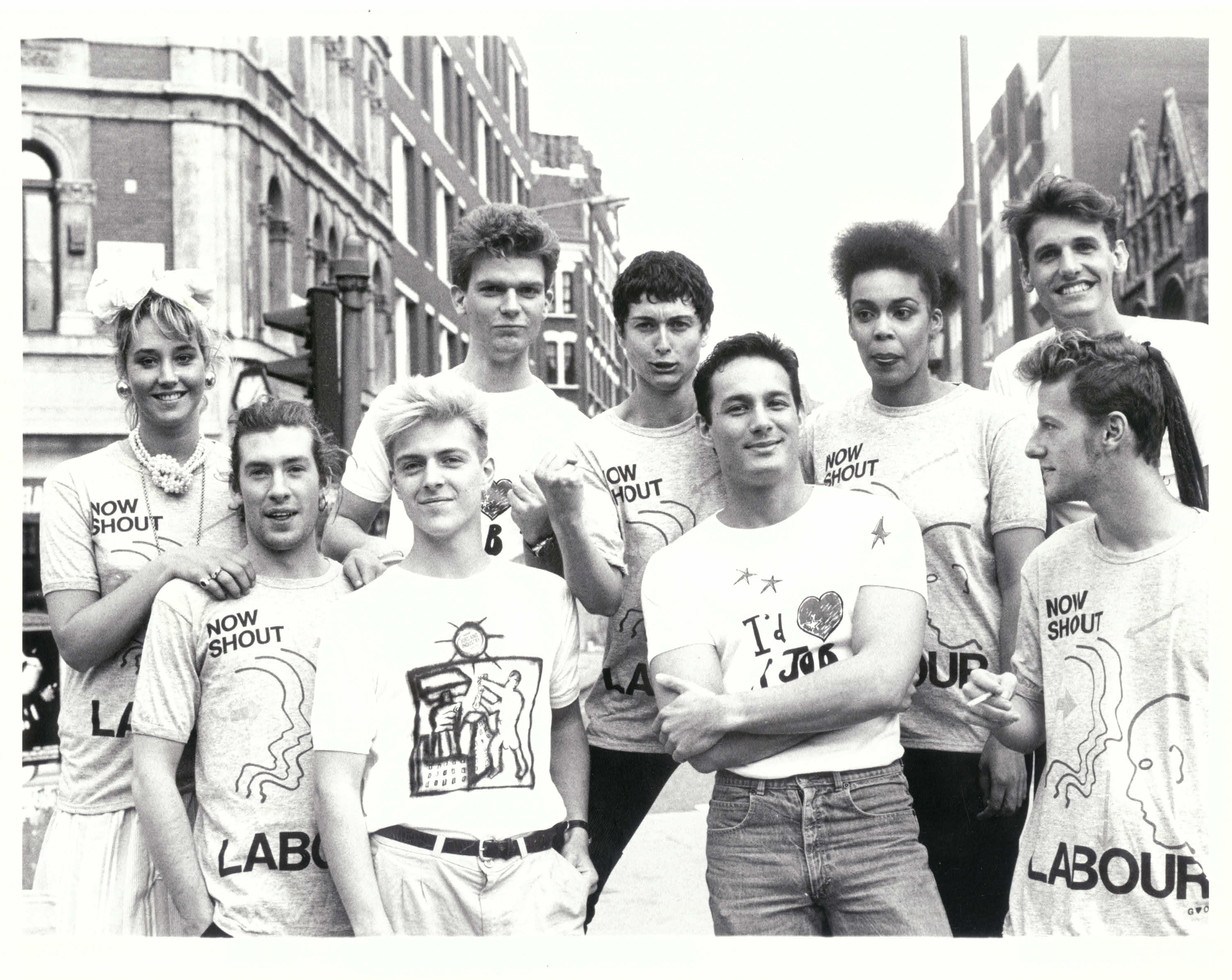
Young members of Red Wedge wearing Grey Organisation t-shirts designed for the Labour Party, 1987.

GO’s image of uniformed anonymity, shaved heads, white shirts, and grey English suits were key to the GO manifesto. They stated that wearing suits afforded them the respect necessary in the 1990's, but shunned the wearing of ties stating, "We wear no ties. All those who see themselves as dissidents in society do like-wise".

GO's recognition began to grow outside of the art world when Lynne Franks launched the Grey Organisation into the 1980s world of PR; modelling for Katharine Hamnett at the Albert Hall and Yohji Yamamoto in Paris; supporting Red Wedge; meeting Neil Kinnock at the Houses of Parliament; and promoting Swatch watches.

Red Wedge was underpinned by a party political broadcast in July 1985 aimed specifically at the young vote. It featured clips from Labour-organised rock concerts, including the performances of Billy Bragg, Aswad and the Communards, extracts from Neil Kinnock’s speeches and interviews with young men and women about the misery of unemployment. The Labour Party also commissioned designers Katharine Hammett, Bodymap and the Grey Organisation to design T-shirts for its Jobs and Industry campaign which largely concentrated on the plight of the young unemployed.

GO also appeared in the Derek Jarman film The Angelic Conversation and the Gilbert & George "Exister" pieces.

== Album artwork ==
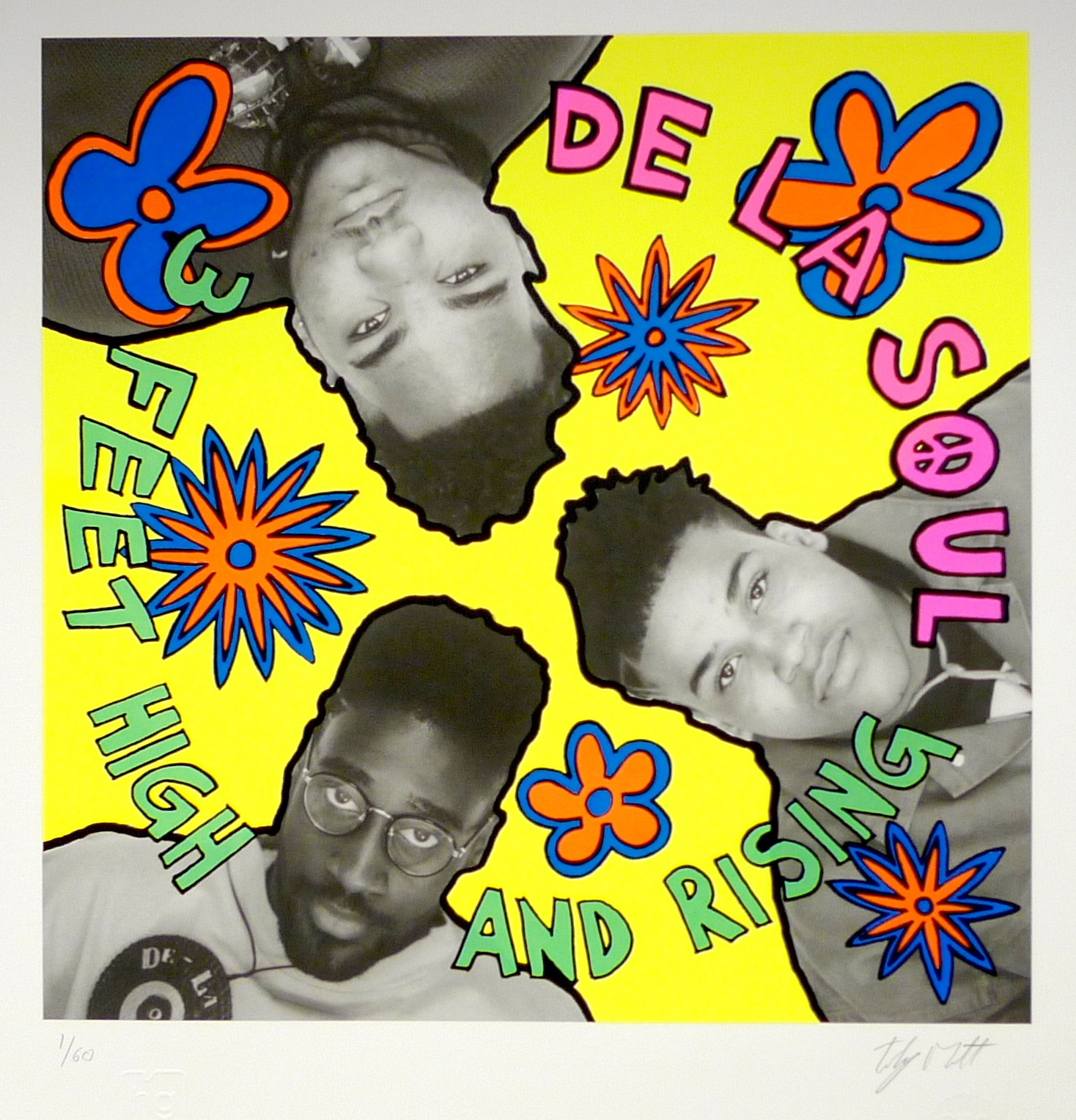
De La Soul's 3 Feet High and Rising, album cover by the Grey Organisation

In the 1980s, whilst living in New York, GO produced a series of album covers for Tommy Boy Records, including for De La Soul's 3 Feet High and Rising and for the band Information Society; and made music videos for bands such as the Rolling Stones ("Mixed Emotions"), Public Enemy ("Shut 'Em Down"), and A Tribe Called Quest ("Can I Kick It"). In 2013, GO member Toby Mott was scheduled to exhibit a print edition of the original 3 Feet High and Rising album art work, displayed alongside memorabilia such as Mott's original sketch, his gold disc, and other items from his private collection.

In an essay written to accompany the exhibition, Mott describes the process of designing the album cover: "De La Soul visit our loft where we lay them down on the floor facing up, their heads making a triangle. We photograph them whilst hanging precariously off a step ladder, one idea being that the cover would not have a right way up. CD's [sic] have yet to be the dominant musical format so the vinyl album sleeve is our most effective way of making a statement [...] The intent of the design of De La Soul's, 3 Feet High and Rising LP cover is to be new and bright, with the overlaying of the fluorescent flowers and text reflecting a synthetic pop cartoon look [...] This is a move away from the prevailing macho hip hop visual codes which dominate to this day".

== Identity ==
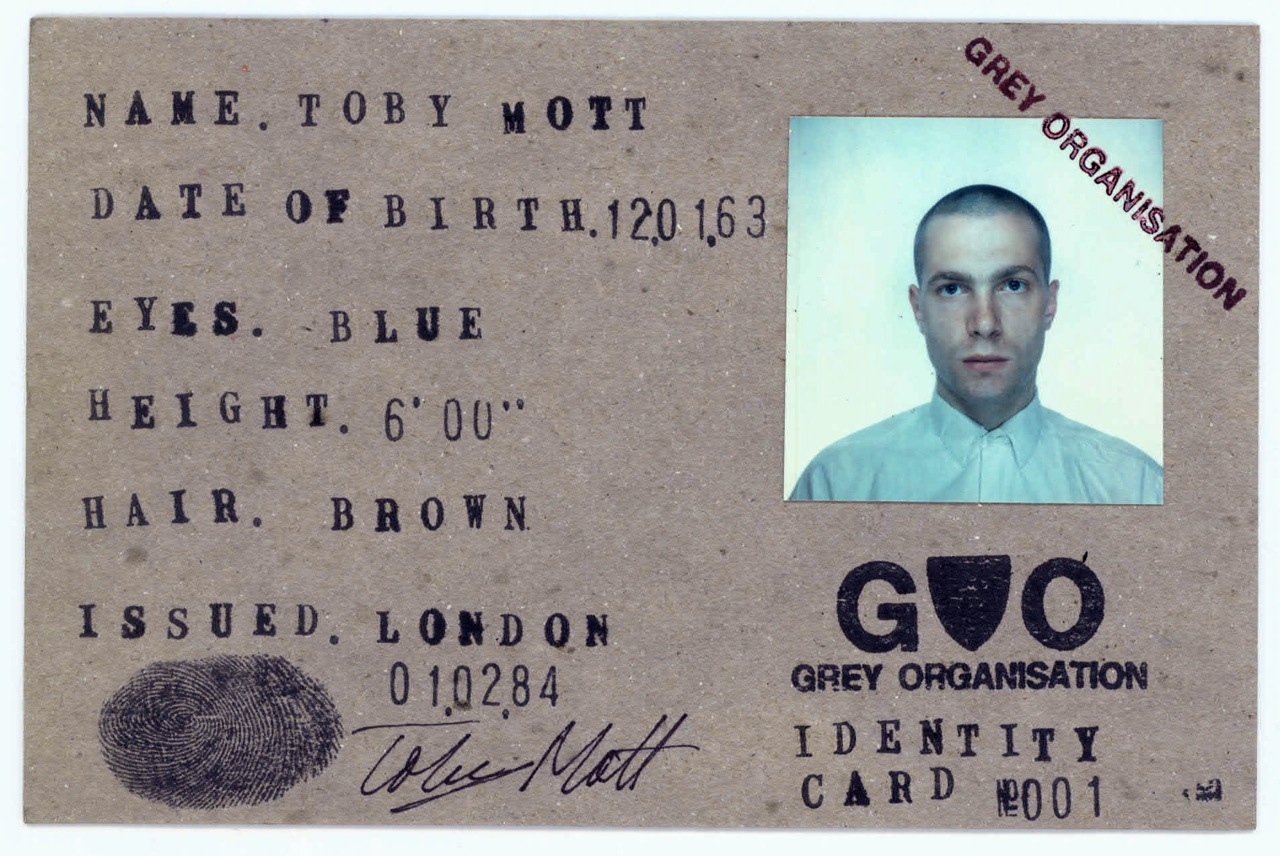
GO ID Card, issued 1 February 1984

The GO logo was stamped on everything the group produced, from artworks to manifestos, from clothing to communiqués. The group also issued ID cards to all members, which included a portrait photograph, their names, date of birth, height, eye and hair colour, issue date and finger print.

== After the Grey Organisation ==
When GO disbanded in 1991, Toby Mott pursued a solo career exhibiting at White Columns NYC, The Thomas Soloman Garage, Los Angeles and Interim Art, London. He was for many years represented by the Maureen Paley Gallery. He is also the founder of The Mott Collection. The collection has been exhibited at the Museo de Arte Contemporáneo de Castilla y León in March 2010. and the Haunch of Venison gallery (London) where it was accompanied by a major publication, Loud Flash: British Punk on Paper.

Paul Spencer left New York City and returned to London in 1991, where he opened a wholesaler and retailer named Wong Singh Jones Ltd on Portobello Road. The aim of this business was to unite the products found in corner shops around the world, items which he called "Cultural Classics and Consumer Icons". The business closed on 24 December 1999.
