= Emmanuel Kaye =

British industrialist (1914–1999)

Sir Emmanuel Kaye CBE
- Born: Emmanuel Kagarlitzky; 29 November 1914; Russia
- Died: 28 February 1999 (aged 84)
- Occupations: Industrialist, philanthropist
- Known for: Leadership of Lansing Bagnall; founding the Kaye Organisation
- Spouse: Lady Elizabeth Kaye
- Awards: Commander of the Order of the British Empire (1967); Knight Bachelor (1974)

Sir Emmanuel Kaye CBE (29 November 1914 – 28 February 1999) was a British industrialist and philanthropist associated with Lansing Bagnall, an electric forklift manufacturer, and with the Kaye Organisation.

== Early life and background ==
Kaye was born in Russia, the son of wheat merchant Zelman Kagarlisky (1877/1878–1926; his name was also spelled "Zalman Kagarlitzky") and his wife, Chassia Annie (1885/6–1943), a botanist. The family came to England when he was young, settling in London. Emmanuel was educated at Richmond Hill School, leaving to work for a small engineering firm at the age of 15. In 1934, his mother changed the family name to "Kaye".

== Career ==
In 1940, Kaye founded J. E. Shay Ltd., described as precision gauge tool and instrument makers. In 1943, he took over Lansing Bagnall, a maker of electric forklift trucks and related equipment.

Kaye later served as founder and chairman of the Kaye Organisation, described as a group with allied companies in Switzerland and Germany, and he chaired Lansing Bagnall and other associated companies. A 1996 Independent report described him as a multi-millionaire, award-winning industrialist and a former leading figure in the Confederation of British Industry (CBI).

He was a donor to Tony Blair's Labour Leader's Office Fund before the 1997 General Election. Kaye was associated with the Labour Friends of Israel.

== Philanthropy ==
The Emmanuel Kaye Foundation is a registered charity in England and Wales (charity number 280281).

Among major beneficiaries of his philanthropy was Emmanuel College, Cambridge, which made him an Honorary Member in 1994. He was Vice-Chairman (1981-85) and Chairman (1985–99) of the Thrombosis Research Trust.

== Public roles ==
Kaye's public activities included involvement with the Confederation of British Industry and membership of the Reviewing Committee on the Export of Works of Art. He was also a trustee of the Glyndebourne Opera from 1979 to 1984.

== Personal life ==
In 1946, Kaye married Elizabeth, daughter of Mark Cutler; they had a son and two daughters. He was appointed C.B.E. in 1967, and Knight Bachelor in 1974.
