= David Annesley =

British sculptor

David Annesley (born 1936) is a British sculptor who rose to prominence in the 1960s.

== Life and work ==
David Annesley was born in 1936 in London and educated in Zimbabwe, Australia and England. After undertaking national service as an RAF pilot between 1956 and 1958, he began studying painting at St Martin's School of Art, London. However, Annesley soon transferred to the sculpture department, finding the teaching more captivating, studying under abstract sculptor Sir Anthony Caro until 1962. He went on to hold tutoring posts at Croydon School of Art, the Central School of Art and Design, and St Martin's between 1963 and 1995.

Annesley experienced early success when his sculptures were chosen for the Young Contemporaries exhibitions in 1961 and 1962, while he also won acclaim for his artwork at The New Generation: 1965 show at the Whitechapel Gallery, London. His first solo exhibition came in 1966 at the Waddington Galleries (now Waddington Custot), London, and was soon followed by a show at the Poindexter Gallery, New York. Annesley enjoyed two further solo exhibitions at Waddington Galleries in 1968 and 1970, before his 'Swing Low' (1964), 'Loquat' (1965) and 'Untitled' (1968–9) sculptures became part of the Tate collection in 1971 as part of the Alastair McAlpine Gift. In 1999 other sculptures in these editions were exhibited at Waddington Galleries in the group show Colour Sculptures: Britain in the Sixties. Annesley went on to exhibit again with Waddington Custot in 2017, and in 2020 with a show of new work.

His work has gone on to be held at many other notable collections across the world. This includes the Museum of Modern Art, New York; the National Museums of Northern Ireland, Nagoya City Art Museum, Japan; and the Arts Council Collection. In 1995, Annesley was elected Fellow of the Royal Society of British Sculptors.

== Style ==
Annesley is known for his open-form, metal-welded geometric sculptures that were inspired by his time in the RAF. His style is typical of the New Generation, a term given to the young sculptors taught by Sir Anthony Caro in the early 1960s. Annesley was a key member of the group, who were noted for their inventive approach. New Generation artists placed their sculptures directly on the ground so that they could occupy the same floor-space as the observer. The group's use of aluminium, fibreglass, and plastic instead of the more expensive and less practical bronze was also innovative, as was the bright colours they employed.

Another major influence of Annesley's is the American Color Field painter Kenneth Noland, to whom he was introduced in 1964 by Caro. Noland helped Annesley bridge the traditionally separate mediums of sculpture and painting by encouraging the use of colour in his work. Annesley then went on to use the simple structures of geometrical shapes as a means of exploring colour relationships. His exhibitions at the Waddington Galleries in 1966 and 1968 were notable for his use of brightly coloured paint to portray the different aspects of his sculptures. Alongside Annesley's dynamic compositions, this helped him project a sense of weightlessness and movement that was at odds with the heavy steel construction of his work. This sense of movement was further delineated by titles of his work, such as 'Godroon' and 'Loquat', picked by Annesley for their unique sounds.
