= Lansing Bagnall =

British forklift truck manufacturer

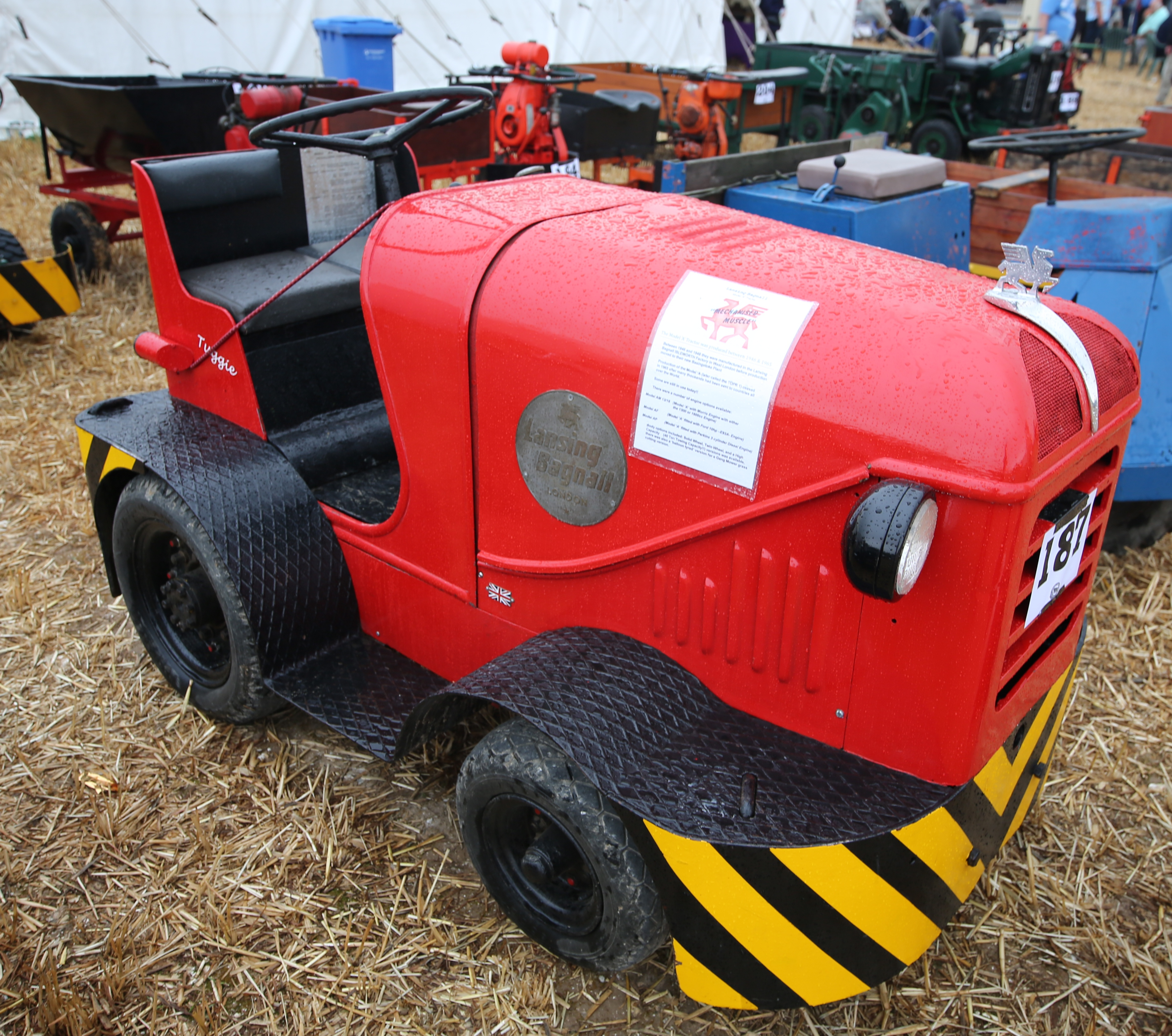
A 1946 Lansing Bagnall Model A industrial tug

Lansing Bagnall, later known as Lansing Linde, was a British forklift truck manufacturer based in Kingsclere Road, Basingstoke, England. The company was known for the invention of the reach truck. Later, it was merged into Linde Material Handling which is now part of KION Group.

== History ==
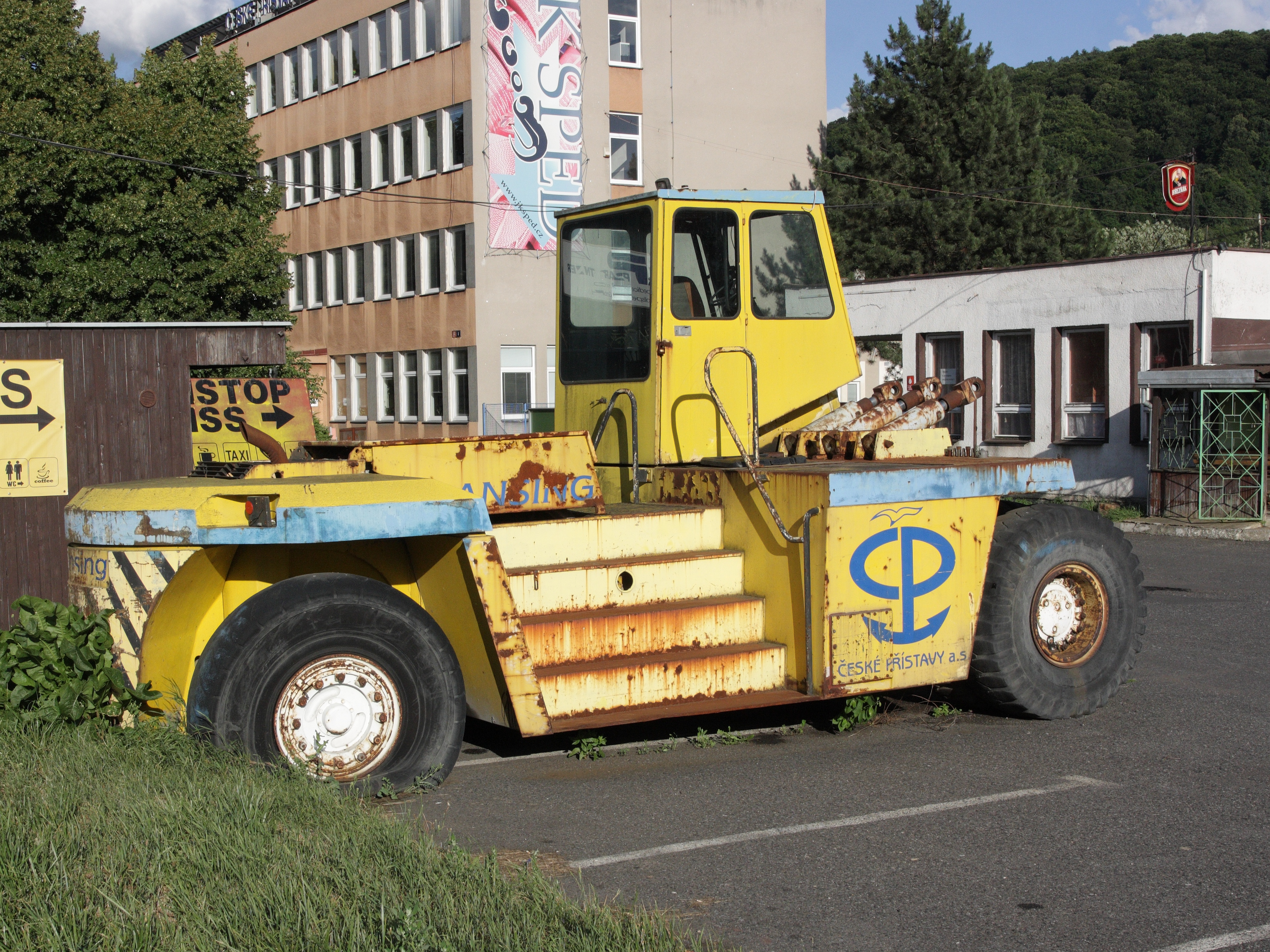
wreck of Lansing toplifter

The business was started as a company office in 1920 when W G Bagnall arrived in London as a representative of Lansing company of Michigan.

In 1930, the parent company, Lansing, ceased manufacturing operations, so Bagnall took the charge and incorporated the company in 1937 as Lansing Bagnall and Company Limited in Isleworth, London.

The company was bought out of bankruptcy in 1943 by Emmanuel Kaye and John R Sharp and renamed after themselves as J E Shay Ltd. At that time, the company made petrol and electric, industrial and station platform tractors. Later, the company went on to produce forklift trucks.

Operating as Lansing Bagnall and Shay's in 1946.

The company's first factory in Basingstoke was opened, in March 1949.

In 1976, Lansing Bagnall acquired the successful private forklift truck manufacturer Henley Forklift, which had been founded in 1966 and developed through the early 1970s, earning three Queen's Awards for export achievement.

Lansing Bagnall was acquired by Linde AG in 1989 and now operates under the Linde Lansing brand name. In September 2006, Linde announced their intention to float or sell the materials handling business that included Linde Lansing.
