= Labour Leader's Office Fund =

The Labour Leader's Office Fund was a blind trust established and run by Lord Levy to finance Tony Blair's work in opposition before the 1997 general election. Contributors to it included the millionaires Sir Trevor Chinn, Sir Emmanuel Kaye, Alex Bernstein and Bob Gavron, the latter two of whom later received peerages.

== Quotes about the fund ==
- "While it does not necessarily follow that the scheme was anything other than the model of probity, there is at least an argument that Lloyd George knew its father." —David Osler, author of Labour Party PLC: New Labour as a Party of Business. (Lloyd George was infamous for selling honours in the early 20th century.)

== See also ==
- Political funding in the United Kingdom
