= Jedd Novatt =

American sculpture artist

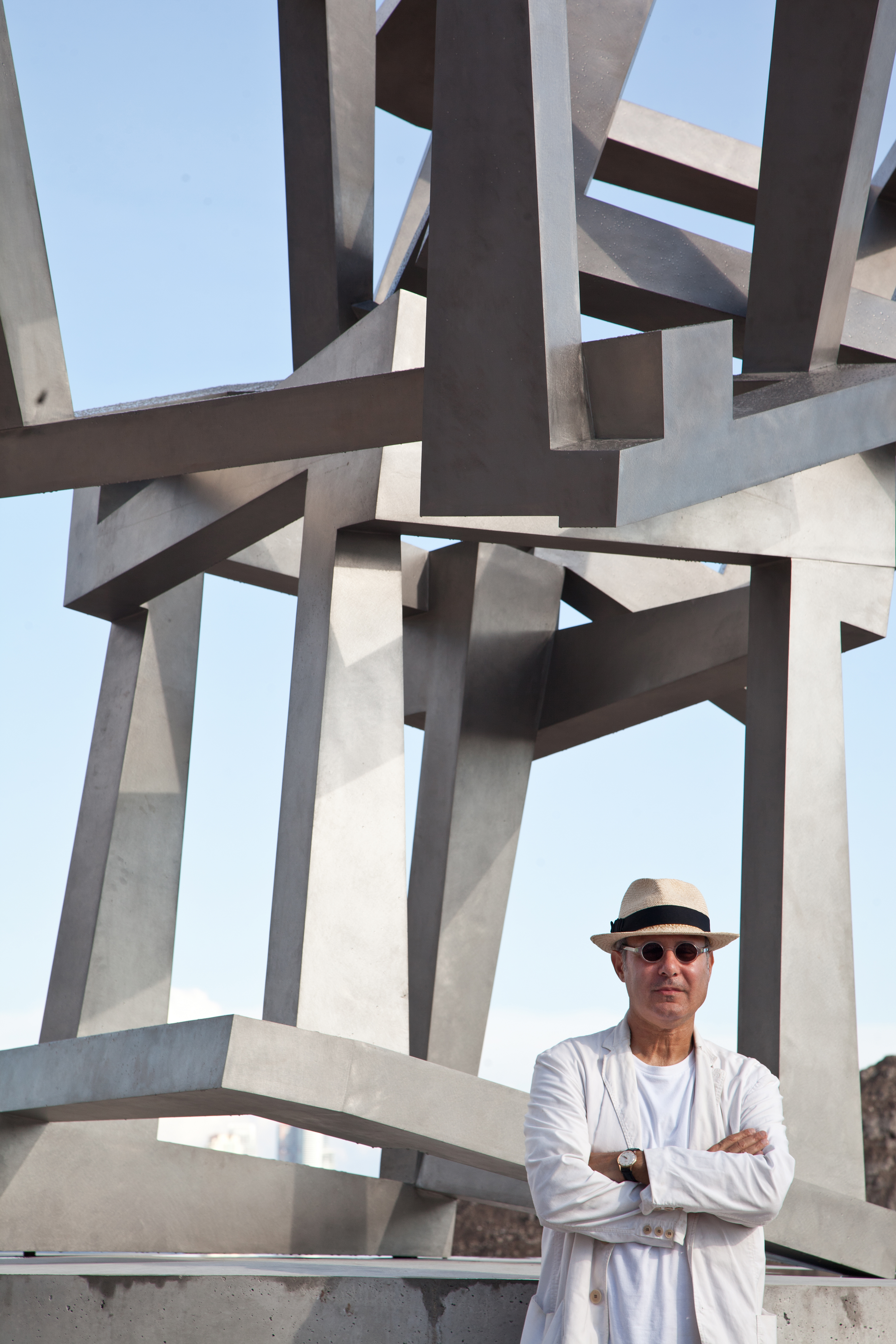
- Jedd Novatt, Chaos SAS, Pérez Art Museum Miami
- Born: Jedd Antony Novatt; March 5, 1958 (age 68); New York City, NY, United States
- Education: Sarah Lawrence College, Lacoste School of the Arts
- Known for: Sculpture
- Notable work: "Chaos SAS"
- Movement: Contemporary art
- Website: www.jeddnovatt.com

Jedd Novatt (born 1958) is an American sculptor who creates dynamic, non-representational compositions of geometric forms. He is best known for his 'Chaos' series of works in either welded steel or bronze.

== Life and work ==
Born in Brooklyn, New York, Novatt studied literature and sculpture at Sarah Lawrence College before moving to France to study sculpture at the Lacoste School of the Arts (now operated by Savannah College of Art & Design).

Novatt lived and worked in Manhattan until 2002, where he was recognized for his welded and painted steel sculptures and bold, black-and-white collages. He currently resides in Paris France and divides his time among studios in Normandy, New York and the Basque region in Spain.

Novatt's first solo show was in 1993 at the Tibor de Nagy Gallery. Since then, his works have been exhibited extensively in galleries and museums in the United States and Europe. Novatt's works are held in numerous public and private collections worldwide.

Novatt's primary motif, “Chaos”, involves constructions of cube-like forms. Whether the works are created in steel or bronze, the configuration of elements "seems to teeter as if on the point of collapse.” One critic noted: “Novatt searches to capture an instant of equilibrium in unstable and fragile situations, similar to our existential condition, but also to the particular moment that we are living.”

Novatt says: "The title Chaos represents an idea that encapsulates various aspects of the definition of the word chaos. Ironically, order is a large part of the idea; or rather the realisation that order might be random. I think about this word for different reasons, but in the end the title Chaos best describes a response to many things, and full of contradictions."

In 2008, Novatt unveiled a series of monumental sculptures entitled Chaos Vascos. The first in the series was part of a solo exhibition at La Piscine, Musée d'Art et d'Industrie de Roubaix in France where it remains on permanent exhibition at the museum's entrance. Chaos Vascos II was selected for the Beyond Limits 2008 Sotheby's exhibition at Chatsworth House in Derbyshire, England.

2009 saw the unveiling of Chaos Mundaka, the third in Novatt's series of monumental works. Chaos Mundaka I, was exhibited at Alfa Arte in Spain before being permanently installed in front of the Savannah College of Art and Design, Atlanta Georgia, in October 2009. Chaos Mundaka II, became part of Sotheby's 2009 edition of Beyond Limits at Chatsworth House.

In 2011, an American benefactor donated Chaos Pamplona to the Town of Yountville located in Napa Valley, California. This monumental work was installed on July 11, 2011. The official dedication ceremony will take place at 10am on July 16, 2011, with both the benefactor and artist in attendance.

In 2012, the city of Bilbao, Spain installed Chaos Nervion by Jedd Novatt in the Campa de los Ingleses surrounded by the Guggenheim Museum, Raphael Moneo Library and the Cesar Pelli tower. The work was unveiled on July 27 with the Mayor of Bilbao Iñaki Azkuna in attendance.

In 2013, Novatt's monumental works Chaos SAS (pictured above) and Chaos Bizkaia were permanently installed in Miami, Florida as part of the Pérez Art Museum Miami's collection.

In April 2016, Chaos Meteoro, an important monumental work, was unveil at Chatworth House in Derbyshire, United Kingdom.

Starting in October 2021, the Pérez Art Museum Miami is holding a solo exhibition of Novatt's large-scale monotypes and small-scale sculptures, in addition to the two monumental works in the outdoor sculpture garden.
