= André Fauteux =

Canadian sculptor (born 1946)

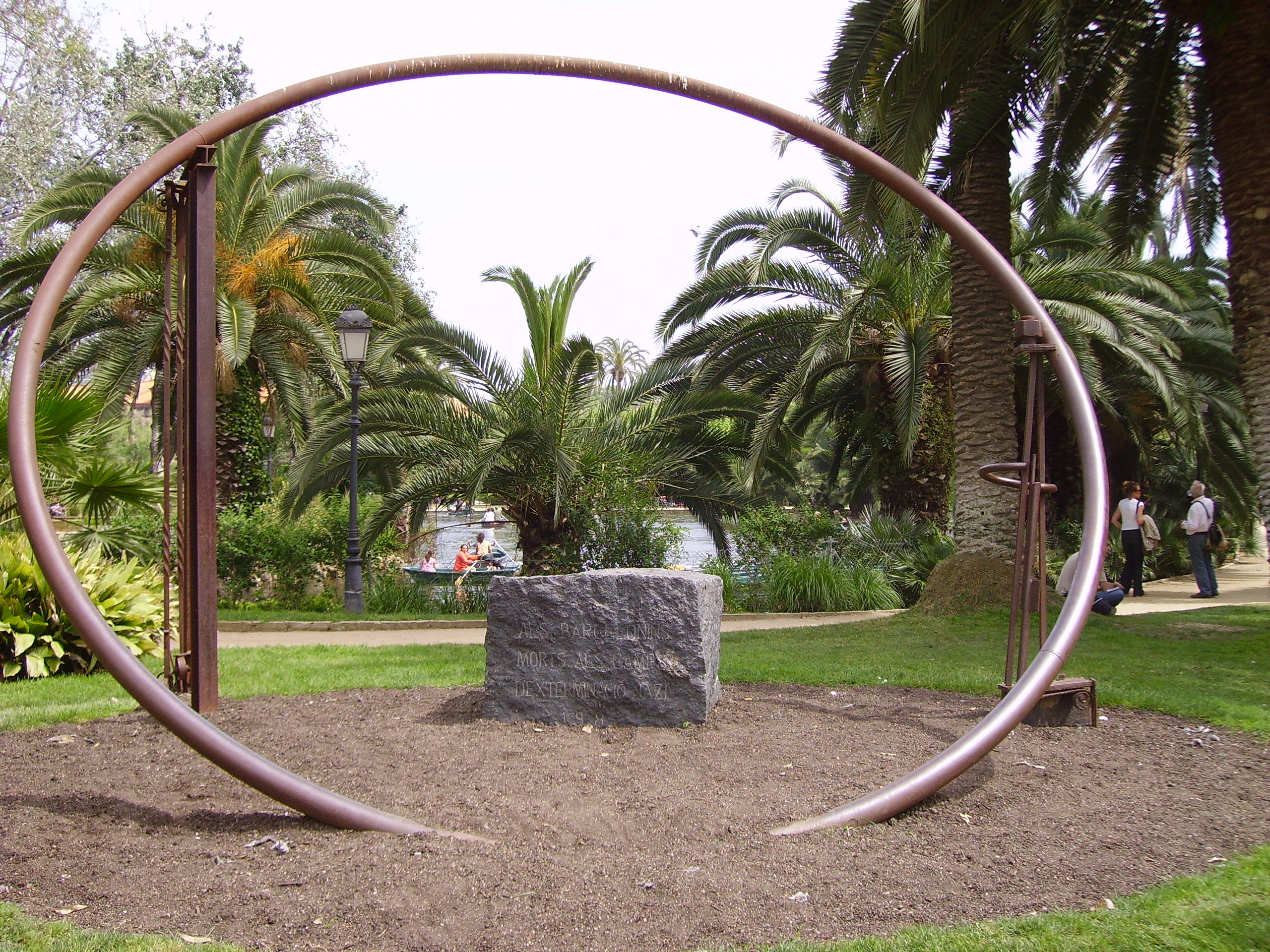
- André Fauteux's Holocaust memorial in Barcelona, Spain
- Born: March 15, 1946 (age 80); Dunnville, Ontario, Canada
- Known for: sculptor
- Movement: abstract modernist Formalist
- Spouse: Carol Sutton (m. 1977)

André Fauteux (born March 15, 1946) is a Canadian artist who now lives in Toronto, Ontario. Fauteux is a sculptor known for his abstract welded steel sculpture, which is related to Geometric abstraction. His modernist sculptures are also related to the Formalist ideas associated with Clement Greenberg.

== Early life and education ==
Fauteux was raised by his mother, Lyle Secord Fauteux, née Ferguson, in Hamilton, Ontario. She encouraged his artistic endeavors. He attended Upper Canada College in Toronto as a boy, where Vernon Mould taught him painting. He next studied art at Central Technical School in Toronto, Ontario, principally with Robert Ross and Winston Laurence, in the mid-1960s.

== Career ==
Fauteux moved to Ibiza, Spain in 1967, where he met other artists, including Graham Coughtry and Gordon Rayner. While in Ibiza, he painted and only began sculpture after his return move to Toronto in 1969. His first work was made of wood.

Fauteux worked at a Toronto gallery owned by Avrom Isaacs in the late 1960s. In 1970, he received his first Canada Council for the Arts grant. Fauteux worked with Anthony Caro at York University in 1974 and 1975, afterwards working as a minimalist sculptor in steel. He was a guest artist at the Emma Lake Artists' Workshops in 1976. He showed with the Sable Castelli Gallery in the Yorkville area for over 25 years. In New York City, he showed with William Edward O'Reilly Gallery.

In 1987, Fauteux was chosen by Helen Frankenthaler as one of five artists chosen to receive the Francis J. Greenburger Foundation Awards presented at the Guggenheim Museum. Also in 1987, he participated in Triangle Barcelona, Casa de la Caridad, Barcelona, where he made a large circular sculpture that is now a Holocaust Memorial in the Parc de la Ciutadella. Fauteux returned to Spain in 1990 to make sculptures at the Centre D'ART la Rectoria, Sant Pere Villamajor, Catalonia.

In recent years, his art was represented by the Moore Gallery in Toronto, which had shows of Fauteux's boldly colored and shaped paintings.

== Style ==
Fauteux sculptures are spare in form and do not replicate external subjects. The modernistic style is an international contemporary aesthetic. The sculptures include visual spaces, often with a rhythmic quality made of repeated elements and over-lapping sections. Examples of this are the group of pyramid galvanized sculptures made in 1976 (Triangle no. 1) and in pieces such as Verve 1975, Moro 1977, and Rosalino Roll, 1977. There are clearly connected elements within works such as Blacksmith 1974, Empire 1976, and Fountain of Irony 1987. Fauteux has also used other materials including rubber in a group of works made in Chicago, Illinois in the 1990s; such as La Salle Loop, of gum rubber and brass. Recent sculpture has been colored with multiple layers of polychrome color and iridescent pigments, on top of coated galvanized steel and with some elements which are dipped in chrome and therefore shiny.

== Major shows ==
In 1975, The Condition of Sculpture, was held at the Hayward Gallery, London and included Fauteux. In 1976, he showed at the Dietcher O'Reilly Gallery, New York and in 1977, in Eleven Sculptors, Musée d'art contemporain de Montréal, Montreal. In 1982–83 a major retrospective of his sculpture toured Canada's museums: André Fauteux Ten Years organized and originating at the Agnes Etherington Art Centre, which included a catalog essay by Karen Wilkin. In 1988, he held a show at Gallery One, Toronto which was reviewed positively. In 1989, he did an installation at Ball State University Art Gallery, Muncie, Indiana and in 1990–1991, he showed work in solo shows in New York, Toronto, Chicago and Barcelona.

== Selected public collections ==
Fauteux's art work is held in major public collections across North America and abroad in Spain. These collections include the Art Gallery of Ontario, Toronto and National Gallery of Canada.

== Awards ==
- Canada Council Grants
- Francis J. Greenburger Foundation Award (1987) Guggenheim Museum; André Fauteux, was chosen by Helen Frankenthaler as one of five artists chosen to receive the Francis J. Greenburger Foundation Awards presented at the Guggenheim Museum.

== Filmography ==
Fauteux appeared in the 1979 National Film Board film Jack Bush, explaining how Bush influenced him. The film was directed by Murray Battle and produced by Rudy Buttignol at Cinema Productions.

== See also ==
- List of sculptors
