= Theo Waddington =

British art dealer (born 1943)

Theodore Balfour Waddington (born November 1943) is a British art dealer.

== Early life and education ==
Theodore Balfour Waddington (born November 1943) is the son of Victor Waddington, and the younger brother of Leslie Waddington, both art dealers. Growing up, Theo and his brother played chess with Samuel Beckett when they were in Paris.

== Career ==
At one time, he had five art galleries and at least 40 staff.

== Personal life ==
Theo and his wife, Vivienne Waddington, were living in Ballycotton, County Cork, Ireland until at least 2012.
