= Milly Ristvedt =

Canadian painter (born 1942)

- Born: 1942 (age 83–84); Kimberley, British Columbia, Canada
- Occupation: Artist

Milly Ristvedt (born 1942 in Kimberley, B.C.), also known as Milly Ristvedt-Handerek, is a Canadian abstract painter. Ristvedt lives and paints in Ontario, where she is represented by the Oeno Gallery. A monograph covering a ten-year retrospective of her work, Milly Ristvedt-Handerek: Paintings of a Decade, was published by the Agnes Etherington Art Centre in 1979. In 2017, a second monograph was published by Oeno Gallery which included a survey of paintings from 1964 through to 2016, Milly Ristvedt, Colour and Meaning : an incomplete palette.

== Education ==
Ristvedt studied at the Vancouver School of Art from 1961 to 1964, and later attained a master's degree in Art History from Queen's University, with her thesis, Reinhardt, Martin, Richter: Colour in the Grid of Contemporary Painting.

== Career ==
Ristvedt began her art practice in Toronto in 1964 and had her first exhibition there in 1968 with the Carmen Lamanna Gallery. Since 1968 Ristvedt has had more than fifty solo exhibitions, including a travelling ten-year survey exhibition in 1979 organized by the Agnes Etherington Art Centre. She has been featured in multiple publications including Abstract Painting in Canada (Nasgaard, 2007). In the book Canadian Art in the Twentieth Century, the art historian, Joan Murray writes of Ristvedt's technique of creating tension between vibrant borders and interior spaces of colour fields, and "grid-like images frosted with color and texture." According to cultural critic, Elsbeth Cameron, an aspect of Ristvedt's historical importance was her use of non-objective art and in doing so, she "proved that women were capable of using a "male" art form...to express a distinctive voice."

== Collections ==
Her work is in the collections of the Canada Council Art Bank, Art Gallery of Ontario, Montreal Museum of Fine Arts, the Boston Museum of Fine Arts, the Agnes Etherington Art Centre, the Art Gallery of Hamilton, Confederation Centre Art Gallery, Glenbow Museum and Art Gallery, Harvard University, Kitchener-Waterloo Art Gallery, MacKenzie Art Gallery, McMaster University, Musée national des beaux-arts du Québec, Peel Art Gallery, Museum and Archives, Robert McLaughlin Gallery, Sherbrooke University, University of Alberta, University of Lethbridge, Vancouver Art Gallery, the Winnipeg Art Gallery, the National Gallery of Canada and many private and corporate collections.

== Awards ==
In 2012, Ristvedt was awarded the Queen’s Diamond Jubilee Medal for her service as Advocacy Representative for the Royal Canadian Academy of Arts .

== Exhibitions ==
Ristvedt's work has been featured in over fifty solo exhibitions throughout Canada, including the Musee d'Art Contemporain, Montreal, Quebec. Her work has been included in over sixty-five group exhibitions, including those at the Musée d'Art Moderne de Paris; National Gallery of Canada, Ottawa; Art Gallery of Ontario, Toronto; Edmonton Art Gallery, Alberta; Winnipeg Art Gallery, Manitoba; Agnes Etherington Art Centre; Art Gallery of Peterborough; Musée d'art contemporain de Montréal; Musée National d'Art Moderne; and Art Gallery of Alberta and other venues.

== Bibliography ==
Lord, Barry. "Three Young Canadians." Art in America January/February 1969: 87–89.
Norton, Peter. "Wintering the Toronto Galleries." Artscanada April 1970: 68.
Gopnik, Irwin and Myrna. "In the Galleries, Montreal." Artscanada April/May 1971: 64.
Gopnik, Irwin and Myrna. "Montrer All." Artscanada Spring 1972: 67–74.
Greenwood, Michael. "A Selection of Painting in Toronto." artscanada 204/205.April/May (1976)
Smith, Frances K. "Painting Now." Kingston: Agnes Etherington Art Centre, 1977
Wilkin, Karen. "Introduction." Milly Ristvedt-Handerek: Paintings of a Decade 1979
Kritzwizer, Kay. "29 x 9." Artmagazine February/March 1980: 10.
Tourangeau, Jean. "Experiences Visuelles." Vie des Arts printemps 1980: 83.
Woods, Kay. "Milly Ristvedt-Handerek." Artscanada April/May 1980: 35–36.
Cumming, Glen. "Introduction." Viewpoint 29 x 9 1981
Forster, Andrew. "Klonaridis Showcase at Wells Gallery: Some Subtlety Amongst Visual Valentines." Ottawa Revue 1981
Mandel, Corinne. "Milly Ristvedt - Handerek." Artscanada March/April 1981: 57.
Tourangeau, Jean. "Milly Ristvedt, Dix ans de Peinture." Vie des Arts printemps 1981
