= Cork Street =

Street in the West End of London, England

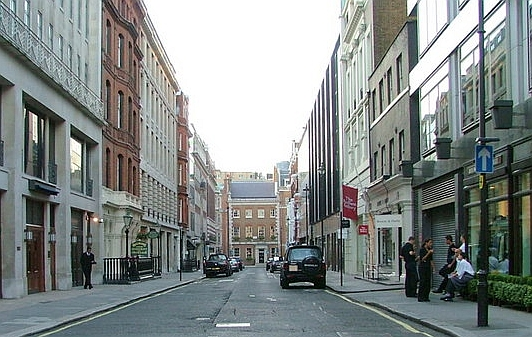
- View north along Cork Street
- Interactive map of Cork Street
- Namesake: Richard Boyle, 1st Earl of Burlington and 2nd Earl of Cork
- Length: 420 ft (130 m)
- Location: Mayfair, London
- Postal code: W1
- Nearest Tube station: Green Park
- south end: Burlington Gardens; 51.5098°N 0.1410°W
- north end: Clifford Street; 51.5108°N 0.1420°W

Cork Street is a street in Mayfair in the West End of London, England, with many contemporary art galleries, and was previously associated with the tailoring industry.

== Location ==
The street runs approximately north-west from the junction of Burlington Arcade with Burlington Gardens, and is close to Burlington House, which houses the Royal Academy of Arts. It is parallel to, and immediately to the east of, New Bond Street. The nearest tube station is Green Park.

== History ==
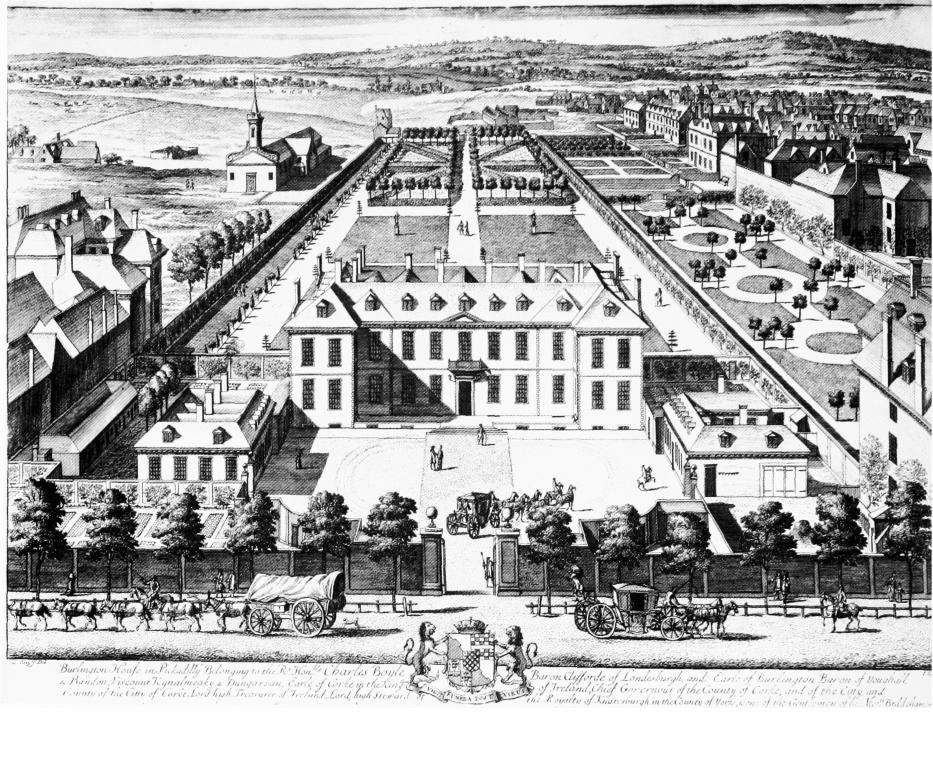
Burlington House in the 1690s. The line of Cork Street runs away from the back of the house on the left side.

Cork Street is part of the Burlington Estate, which was developed from the 18th century. The first Earl of Burlington was Richard Boyle (1612–1698), 2nd Earl of Cork; the street is named for that city.

The street in particular and the area in general was associated with tailors. In particular, the leading Regency London tailors Schweitzer and Davidson were located in Cork Street. Beau Brummell (1778–1840), who introduced the flamboyant form of gentleman's fashion that became known as dandyism, patronised Schweitzer and Davidson in Cork Street. Savile Row, not far from Cork Street to the east, is today the street most associated with high-quality gentleman's tailors.

In the early 20th century, the street became associated with the art world, and is considered to be one of the United Kingdom's "most important art hubs", owing in part to its proximity to the Royal Academy. Its galleries have launched the careers of many major modern artists in Britain; the Mayor Gallery was the venue for the first London exhibitions of Francis Bacon, Max Ernst, Paul Klee, and Joan Miró, and Peggy Guggenheim opened her own gallery at number 30 in 1938. As of 2012 there were 22 galleries in the street.

The art dealer Lillian Browse was nicknamed "The Duchess of Cork Street", and used that name as the title of her autobiography.

=== Attack on Cork Street ===
In 1985 the Grey Organisation, a radical arts collective, launched an attack on Cork Street covering some of the galleries in grey paint. In a press release, GO justified the attacks on Cork Street, describing the galleries established there as "boring and lifeless", stating that the attacks were "intended to liven up their lives a bit!". The attack took place on Tuesday 21 May 1985, somewhere between midnight and 6am. Members of the Grey Organisation were later arrested, released on bail and banned from central London, but when prosecuted at Well Street Magistrates' court, pleaded "not guilty," and were released without charge.

== Campaign ==
In 2012 the Save Cork Street campaign was created to protect the area as a contemporary arts district in the face of mooted regeneration plans. With 13,000 supporters, including David Hockney and Sir Peter Blake, the Save Cork Street campaign attracted major press interest. Chaired by artist and curator Simon Tarrant, the Save Cork Street committee petitioned Westminster Council to stipulate gallery usage for future Cork Street developments.

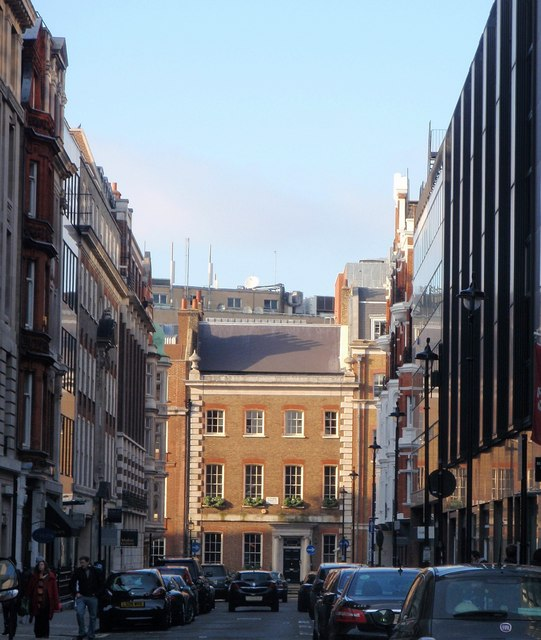
View north to houses on Clifford Street from Cork Street.

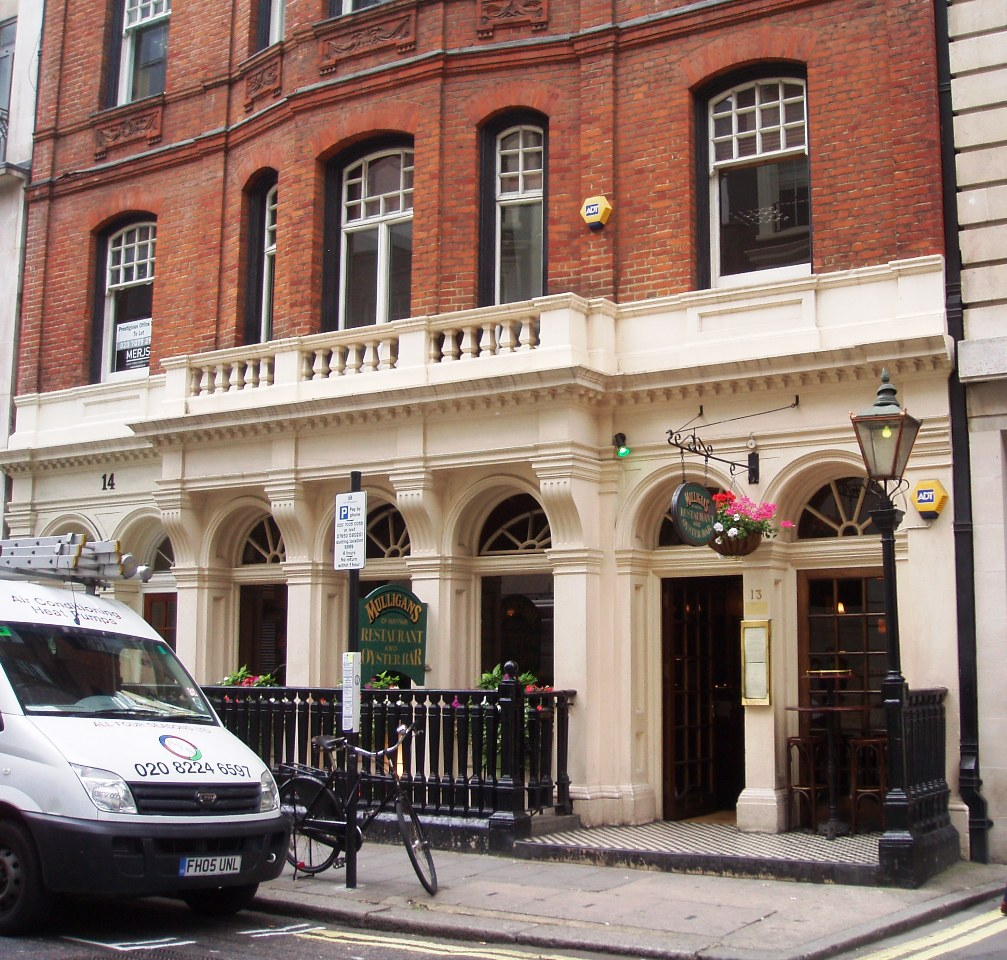
Mulligans of Mayfair, an Irish restaurant at 13 Cork Street (now closed).

== Galleries based along Cork Street ==
- Alison Jacques, 22 Cork Street
- Alon Zakaim Fine Art, 27 Cork Street
- Browse & Darby, 19 Cork Street
- Flowers Gallery, 21 Cork Street
- Goodman Gallery, 26 Cork Street
- Holtermann Fine Art, 30 Cork Street
- The Mayor Gallery, First Floor, 21 Cork Street
- Messums, 28 Cork Street
- Nahmad Projects, 2 Cork Street
- No.9 Cork Street, 9 Cork Street
- The Redfern Gallery, 26 Cork Street
- Stephen Friedman, 5–6 Cork Street
- Waddington Custot, 11–12 Cork Street

== Galleries formerly based along Cork Street ==
- Lisson Gallery (–)
- Saatchi Yates (October 2020–?)
- Mayor Gallery (1933–?)

== See also ==
- Burlington Arcade, opposite the south end of Cork Street
- Dover Street, a street nearby in Mayfair with many art galleries
