= Alexander Bernstein, Baron Bernstein of Craigweil =

The Right Honourable The Lord Bernstein of Craigweil

Member of the House of Lords
- Lord Temporal
- Life peerage 15 May 2000 – 13 April 2010

Personal details
- Born: Alexander Bernstein; 15 March 1936
- Died: 13 April 2010 (aged 74)
- Party: Labour
- Education: Stowe School
- Alma mater: St John's College, Cambridge
- Profession: television executive

Alexander Bernstein, Baron Bernstein of Craigweil (15 March 1936 – 13 April 2010) was a British television executive and Labour member of the House of Lords.

== Life ==
Descended from Latvian Jewish immigrants and educated at Stowe School then St John's College, Cambridge, Bernstein joined the Granada Group, the leisure and television company founded by his uncle, Sidney, and his father, Cecil Bernstein. He was a director of the company, managing director of Granada Television in the 1970s, and chairman of Granada Group 1979–96.

Bernstein was a major contributor to the Labour Leader's Office Fund run by Lord Levy to finance Tony Blair's private office. Created a life peer as Baron Bernstein of Craigweil, of Craigweil in the County of West Sussex, on 15 May 2000, he was active in the Arts, serving on several governing bodies and trusts.

He married Vanessa Anne Mills in 1962; they had a son and a daughter, and divorced in 1993. In 1995, he married Angela Mary née Beveridge, formerly wife of Sir Nicholas Serota.

== See also ==
- Baron Bernstein
