= Angus Herald =

- The heraldic badge of Angus Herald of Arms
- Heraldic tradition: Gallo-British
- Jurisdiction: Scotland
- Governing body: Court of the Lord Lyon

Angus Herald of Arms in Extraordinary is a current Scottish herald of arms in Extraordinary of the Court of the Lord Lyon.

The name of the office is derived from the noble title of the Earl of Angus (currently a subsidiary title of the Duke of Hamilton). The office was active from 1490 to 1513.

The badge of office is A salamander Vert encircled with flames of fire Or all ensigned of the Crown of Scotland Proper. The badge was created in the spring of 2009 by Lord Lyon King of Arms David Sellar. The badge was taken from the crest of the Earl of Angus without the baronial chapeau, on which the salamander usually stands.

The office is currently held by Robin O. Blair, Esq., CVO, WS, the former Lord Lyon. He was appointed to this post on the 17 March 2008.

== Holders of the office ==
Arms	Name	Date of appointment	Ref
	Thomas Pettigrew of Magdalensyde	1492	
	George Bell	1500	
	William Hamilton	1502	
	John Cranston	1505	
	Robin Orr Blair (Office used in Extraordinary)	2008–Present	

== See also ==
- Officer of Arms
- Herald
- Court of the Lord Lyon
- Heraldry Society of Scotland
