= Noblesse in Scotland =

Scottish upper class

The Scottish Noblesse means nobility in Scotland, including both those with peerage titles as well as those without. The concept was prominently advocated for by Sir Thomas Innes of Learney during his tenure as Carrick Pursuivant of Arms and later Lord Lyon King of Arms.

The concept of noblesse as opposed to "nobility" is old: in 1901 a Canadian heraldist Edward Marion Chadwick discussed the difference between the two in France: "pairie" is similar to English peerage, while noblesse consists of gentlemen commoners. "The King ... was the fountain of hereditary title, but not the fountain of noblesse", and noblesse can be obtained without any royal act.

In 2008, the 'noblesse' clause was discreetly removed from newly issued letters patent. This however does not affect the noble quality of armigers, which predates Innes' introduction of the clause. CILANE and its British association recognise a grant of arms as establishing nobility in both England and Scotland, regardless of the wording of the letters patent.

== Background ==
In the early 20th century, Innes of Learney put forth the belief that individuals granted arms by the Court of the Lord Lyon in Scotland effectively become 'Nobles in the Noblesse of Scotland'. This form of hereditary nobility is mostly based on Innes' interpretation of historical precedents and practices:

A patent of arms is − and I say this with full official weight − a Diploma of Nobility

— Thomas Innes of Learney, Scots Heraldry

Innes drew on historical English heraldic traditions, arguing that just as other officers of the Crown had been delegated the power to ennoble individuals in the past, the Lord Lyon should also hold the authority to do so through the granting of coat of arms. However, Innes' position was complicated by the fact that he simultaneously opposed the direct application of English heraldic law and practice to the Scottish context.

The soundness of the basis for Innes' belief that Scottish armigers, by virtue of being granted arms, automatically attain a status of hereditary nobility has been a subject of uncertainty and debate among historians and heraldic scholars. Innes relied heavily on documenting historical English precedents to support his claims despite the fact that he sought to differentiate the Scottish heraldic system from that of England.

== See also ==
- Peerage of Scotland
- Baronage of Scotland
- Laird

== Sources ==
- Innes of Learney, Thomas (1971). Scots Heraldry: A Practical Handbook on the Historical Principles and Modern Application of the Art and Science. Genealogical Publishing Company. ISBN 978-0-8063-0478-6.
- Chadwick, Edward Marion (1901). "The Armiger". Archaeological Journal. 58 (1): 305–321. doi:10.1080/00665983.1901.10852885. ISSN 0066-5983.
- Cox, Noel (1998). "The Law of Arms in New Zealand" (PDF). New Zealand Universities Law Review. 18. SSRN 420753.
