= Lord Lyon King of Arms =

Scottish official with responsibility for regulating heraldry

- The arms of office of Lord Lyon King of Arms
- Heraldic tradition: Gallo-British
- Jurisdiction: Scotland
- Governing body: Court of the Lord Lyon
- Chief officer: Joseph Morrow, Lord Lyon King of Arms

The Right Honourable the Lord Lyon King of Arms, the head of Lyon Court, is the most junior of the Great Officers of State in Scotland and is the Scottish official with responsibility for regulating heraldry in that country, issuing new grants of arms, and serving as the judge of the Court of the Lord Lyon, the oldest heraldic court in the world that is still in daily operation.

The historic title of the post was the High Sennachie, and he was given the title of Lord Lyon from the lion in the coat of arms of Scotland.

The post was in the early nineteenth century held by an important nobleman, the Earl of Kinnoull, whose functions were in practice carried out by the Lyon-Depute. The practice of appointing Lyon-Deputes, however, ceased in 1866.

== Responsibilities ==
The Lord Lyon is responsible for overseeing state ceremonial in Scotland, for the granting of new arms to persons or organisations, and for confirming proven pedigrees and claims to existing arms as well as recognising clan chiefs after due diligence. The Lyon Register (officially the Public Register of All Arms and Bearings in Scotland), on which the Lord Lyon records all Scotland's coats of arms, dates from 1672. The Lord Lyon formerly also registered and recorded clan tartans, only upon request from the clan chief, but this function has been taken over by the Scottish Register of Tartans.

As Lyon Court is a government department, fees paid for granting coats of arms are paid to the Treasury. The misuse of arms is a criminal offence in Scotland, and treated as tax evasion. Prosecutions are brought before Lyon Court, Lord Lyon being the sole judge. Appeals from the Lyon Court can be made to the Court of Session in Edinburgh.

There is no appeal if the Lord Lyon refuses to grant a coat of arms, as this is not a judicial function, but an exercise of his ministerial function, although an appeal by way of judicial review may succeed if it can be shown that the Lord Lyon acted unreasonably.

== Equivalents ==
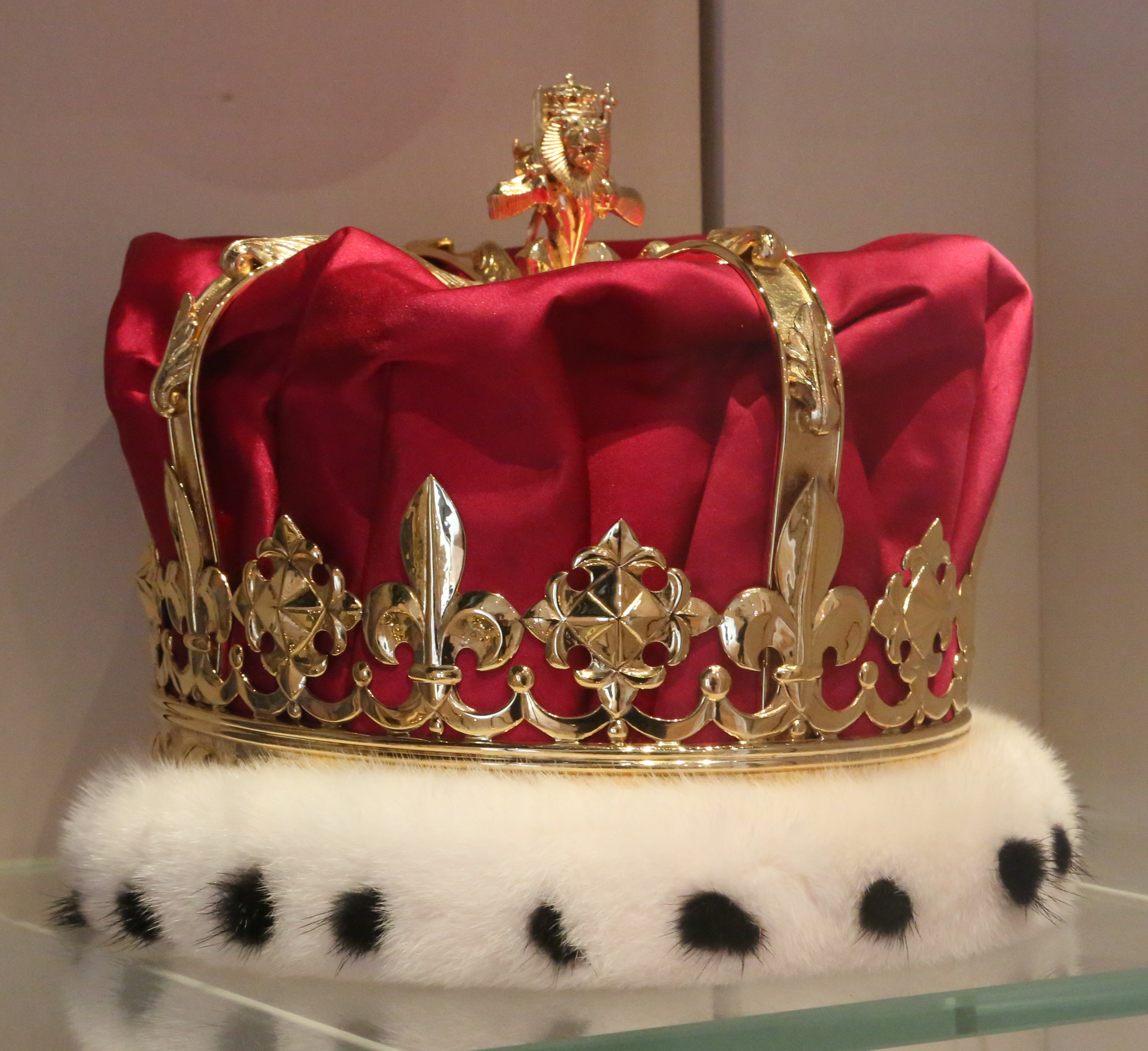
Lord Lyon King of Arms' crown

The Lord Lyon has several English equivalents:

- Being responsible for Scottish state ceremonies he parallels the Earl Marshal in England.
- The Lord Lyon is the heraldic authority for Scotland, much as the English Kings of Arms are responsible for granting arms in England. England has three "Kings of Arms", or high heraldic officers (Lord Lyon is Scotland's only one): Garter Principal, Clarenceux (responsible for southern England), and Norroy and Ulster (responsible for northern England and Northern Ireland). Unlike the English Kings of Arms, who cannot grant arms without a warrant from the (English) Earl Marshal, Lyon does not need permission, but grants by his own power.
- Whilst in England the Court of Chivalry (which last met in 1954) is a civil court, in Scotland the Lyon Court meets often and has criminal jurisdiction. Lord Lyon is empowered to have assumed coats of arms, and whatever they are affixed to, destroyed. As an example, when Leith Town Hall, now used as a police station, was renovated during the 1990s, several of the coats of arms decorating the Council Chamber were found to be attributed to the wrong person. The police were given special permission to retain the display, on condition that the tourist guides pointed out the historical anomalies.

The Lord Lyon is also one of the few individuals in Scotland officially permitted to fly the "Lion Rampant", the Royal Banner of Scotland.

== Etymology ==
The name of office – Lord Lyon – is attributed in reference to the heraldic lion of the Kingdom of Scotland worn on the Lord Lyon's tabard, and has its oldest appearance in written English or Scots in 1381, with one earlier 1377 reference existing in Latin, from the Exchequer Rolls of Scotland.

== Symbols of office ==
A new collar of state was made in 1998 – a chain with 40 gold links, replacing the item that went missing after the Battle of Culloden. In 2003 a new crown was made for the Lord Lyon, modelled on the Scottish royal crown among the Honours of Scotland. This crown has removable arches (like one of the Queen Elizabeth The Queen Mother's crowns) which are removed at coronations to avoid any hint of lèse majesté.

In Scotland, Sir Walter Scott notes that the inauguration of the Lord Lyon closely mirrored the royal coronation itself, with the sole distinction being that wine, rather than oil, was poured over the candidate's head. The appointment of Sir David Lindsay illustrates just how highly the office was regarded: King James VI crowned him using Scotland's ancient crown – predating the adoption of the closed crown by Scottish monarchs – and even permitted him to wear it at the royal table. This was an extraordinary privilege, particularly given James VI's well-known reverence for the concept of royal prerogative and sovereignty. Such an honour makes sense only when the Lord Lyon is understood not merely as a royal official, but as a living embodiment of the king's own authority.

== Holders of the office ==
=== Lord Lyon Kings of Arms ===
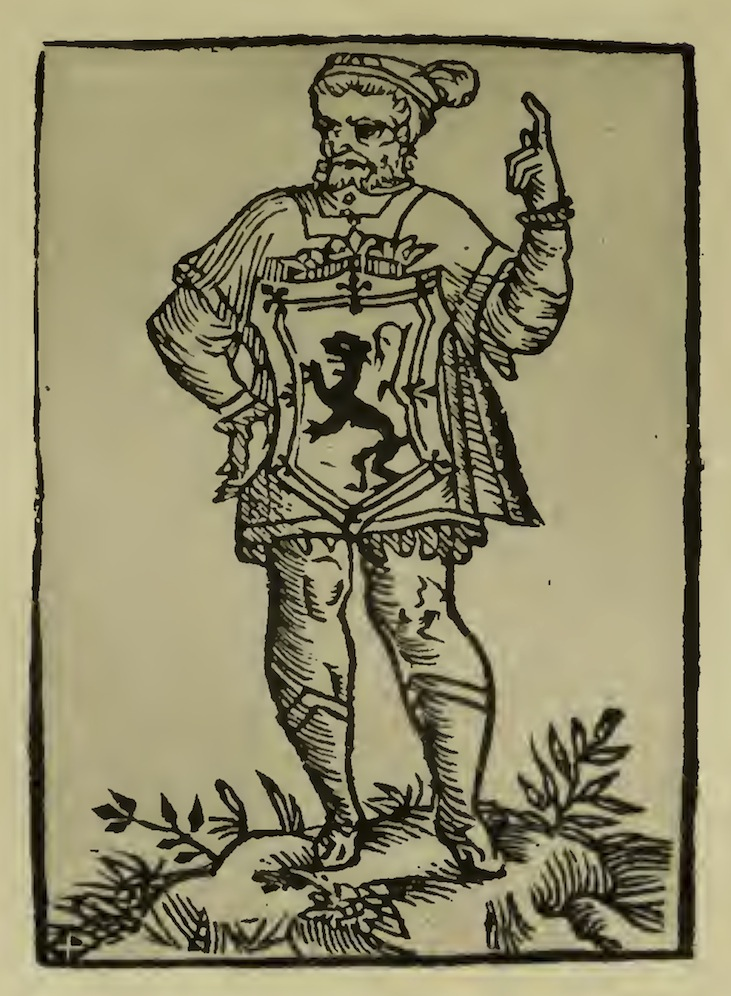
Sir David Lindsay of the Mount was Lord Lyon from 1542 to 1554. A poet and diplomat during Renaissance Scotland.

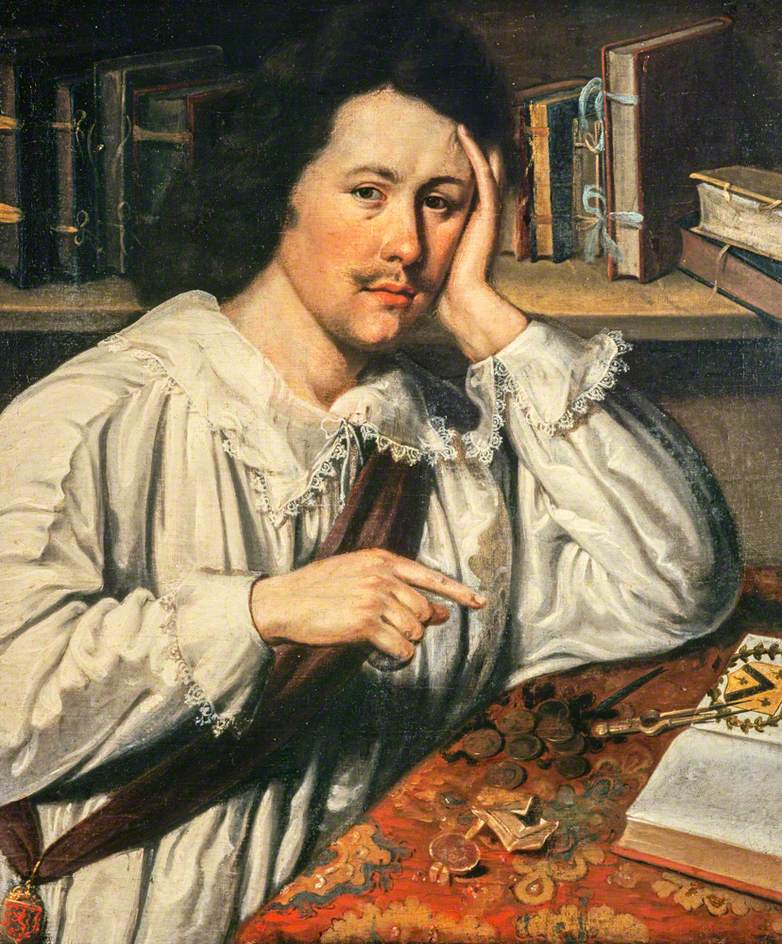
Sir James Balfour, 1st Baronet of Denmilne and Kinnaird, was Lord Lyon from 1630 to 1654. Noted scholar, annalist and antiquary. In 1654 he was deprived of his office by Oliver Cromwell.

The seal of the Lord Lyon King of Arms, created in 1673, depicting the arms of the Lord Lyon.

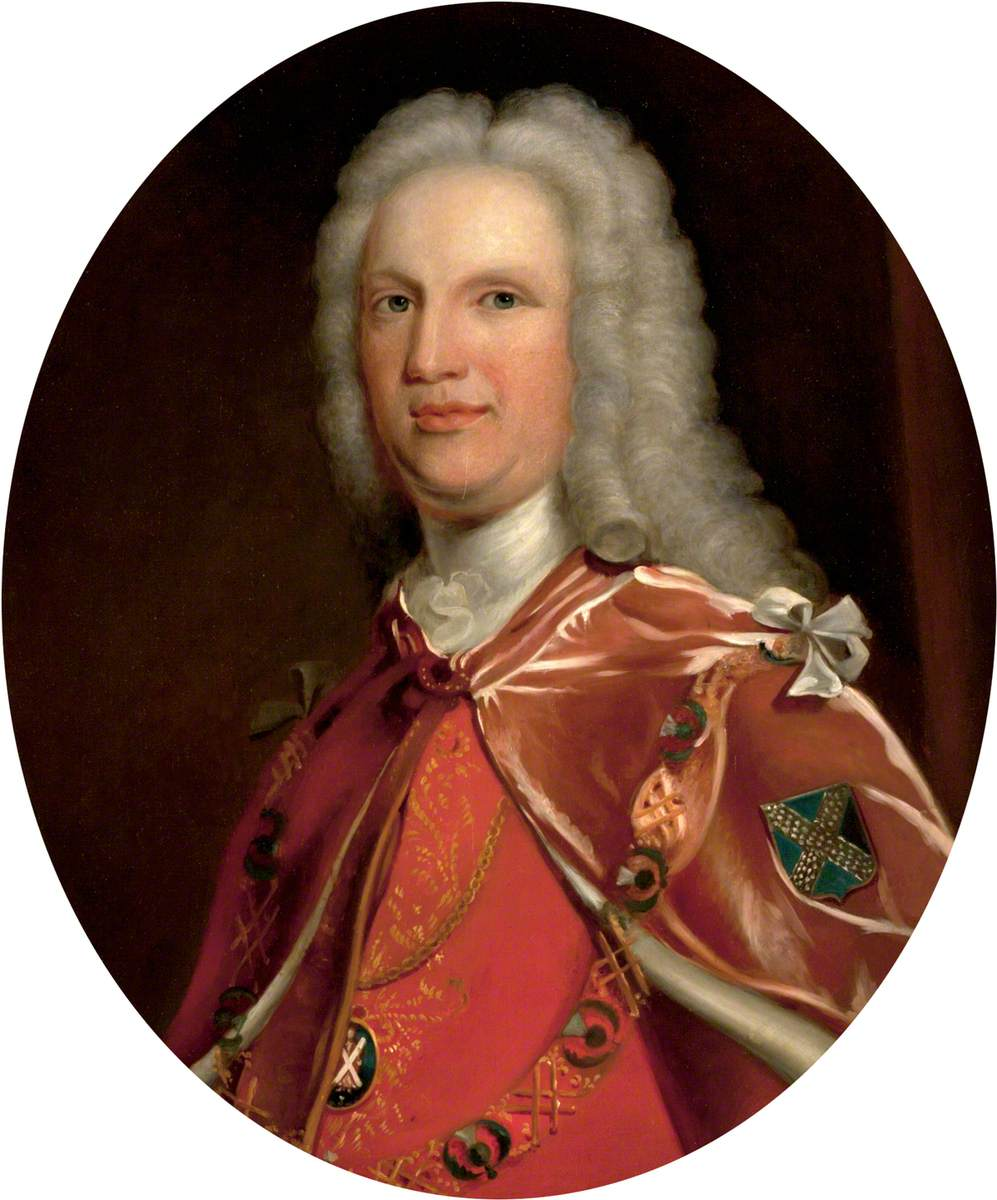
Alexander Brodie, 19th of that Ilk, was Lord Lyon from 1727 to 1754. Despite receiving the Lyon office as a political reward, he nevertheless undertook his duties seriously.

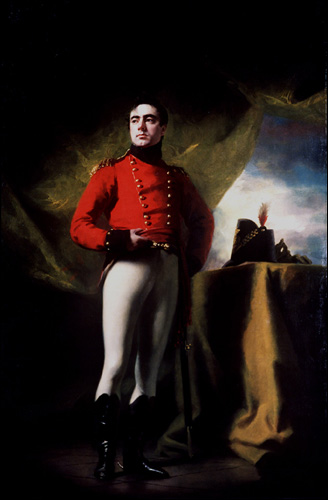
Thomas Hay-Drummond, 11th Earl of Kinnoull, was Lord Lyon from 1804 to 1866. Treated the office as a sinecure and left his duties to the Lyon Depute.

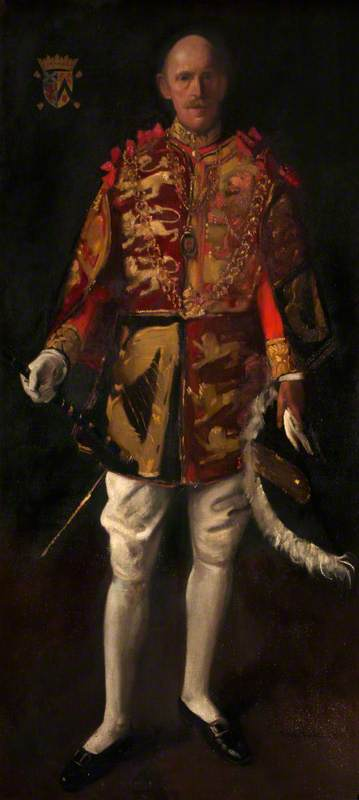
Sir James Balfour Paul was Lord Lyon from 1890 to 1926. Lawyer and scholar, he wrote many books concerning Scotland's heritage.

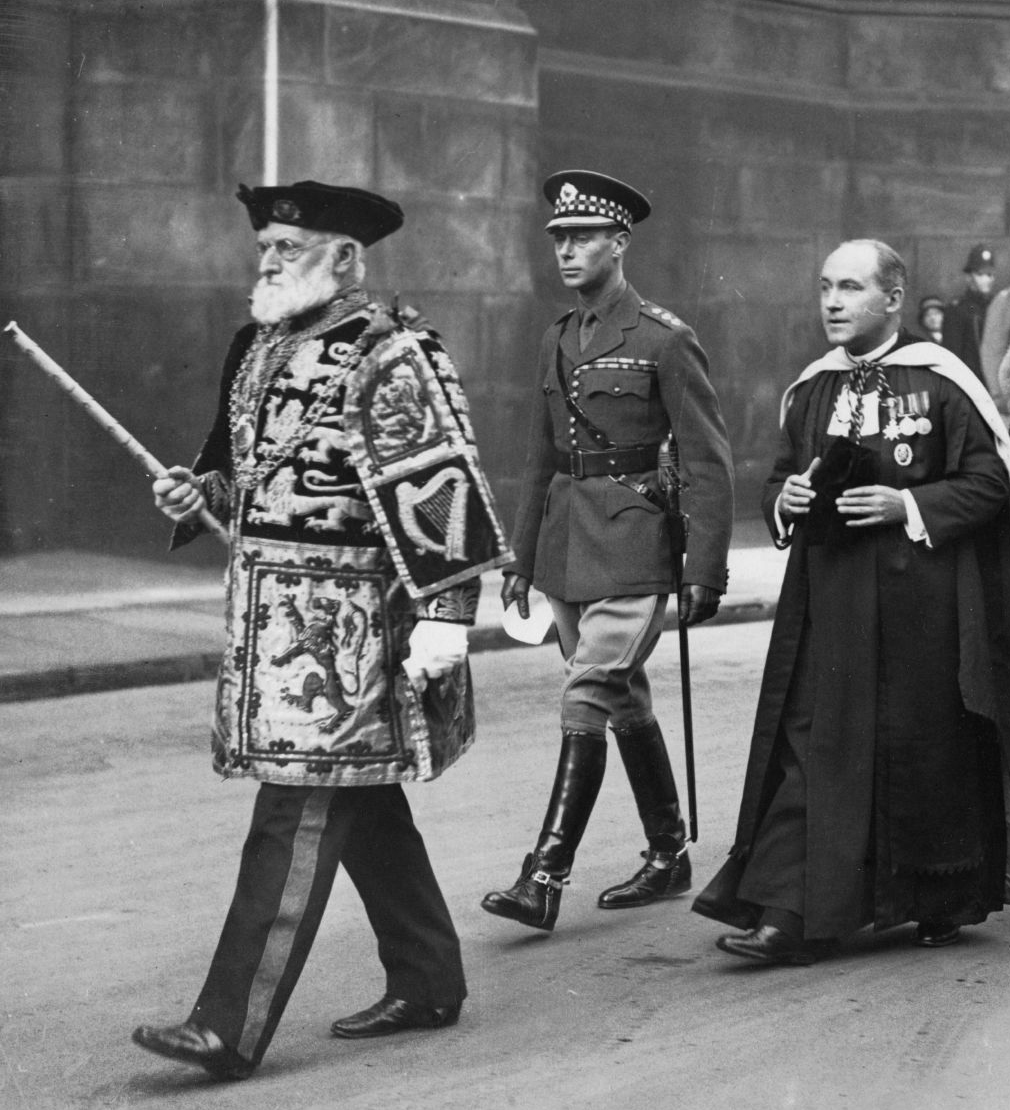
Sir Francis Grant was Lord Lyon from 1929 to 1945. Grant (left), and the Duke of York (centre) proceeding to St Giles' Cathedral in 1933.

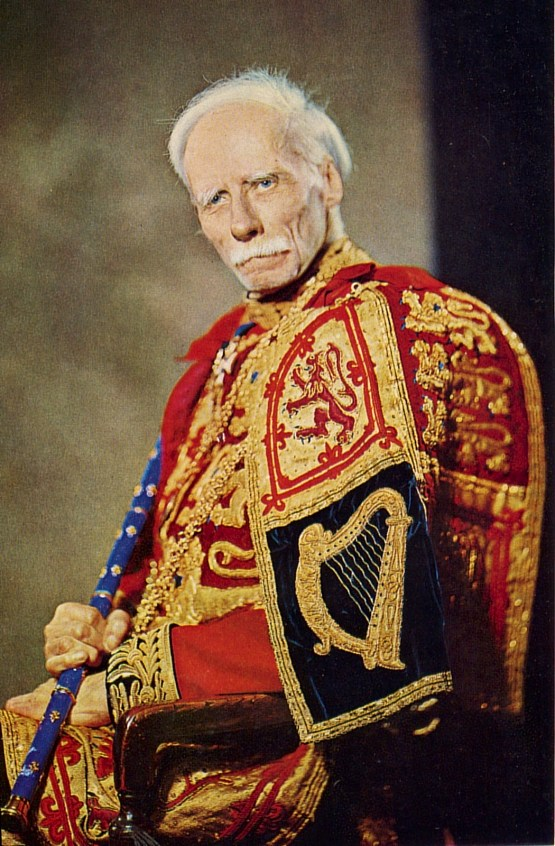
Sir Thomas Innes of Learney was Lord Lyon from 1945 to 1969, wearing the tabard of the Royal arms of the United Kingdom (with the Scottish royal arms taking precedence) and holding the staff of the Lyon's office.

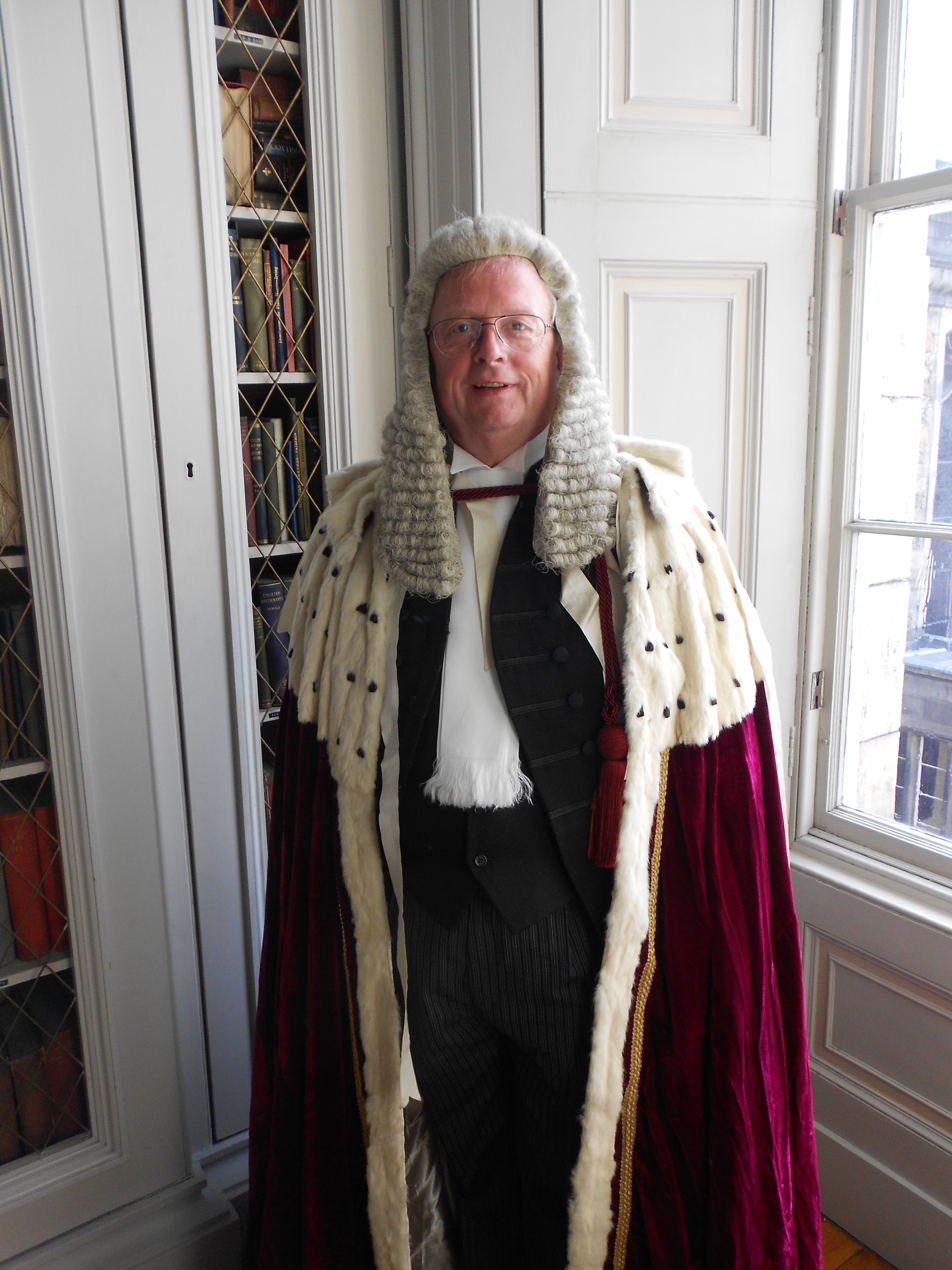
Dr. Joseph John Morrow has been Lord Lyon since 2014, wearing his wig and judicial robes as Lord Lyon.

Arms	Name	Dates of office	Notes	Ref
	Unknown	pre 1399 (1377)	There is an oft-repeated statement that Robert the Bruce created a Lyon King of Arms in 1318, but this is open to considerable doubt. The story seems to have been originated in the fifteenth century by a sub-prior of Arbroath Abbey, one William de Pittenweem. However, the Exchequer and other Records do not support the assertion and it is not until 1377 that the office of "Lyoun Herauld" is known to have existed.	
	Henry Greve	circa 1399	The office of Lord Lyon predates the year 1399, but with Henry Greve recorded as the first holder during the reign of Robert III. Greve was recorded in an English Issue Rolls as "King of Scottish Heralds", and that he was at the Tower of London in 1399, either at or immediately after the coronation of Henry IV. The Lyon appears in several embassies about this period both to England and France.	
	... Douglas	1400–1421	From 1391 onwards there is frequent mention of one Douglas, "Herald of the King", and in 1421 he is styled "Lyon Herald."	
	Alexander Nairne of Sandford	1437–1450	The founder of the House of Sandford, Lyon King of Arms, and Comptroller of Scotland of James II.	
	Duncan Dundas of Newliston	1450–1471	The second son of James Dundas of that Ilk, Dundas was much noted in his time and was frequently employed in embassies to England. He is said to have discharged his duty in those negotiations "with integrity and honour". He acquired the feudal barony of Newliston, and founded a branch of the Dundas family there, the Dundases of Newliston.	
	The Laird of Woodhead	1471–1481		
	Unknown	1481–1489	The name of this herald was not expressly mentioned, but he was sent on an errand as the king's "sympell servant" to Cumbernauld on the complaint of Lady Fleming in 1484. His seal was attached to a document and bears a crescent between three mullets, which may indicate that his name was Arbuthnot or Murray.	
	Sir Andrew Murray of Truim	1489–1496	Formerly Albany or Islay Herald	
	Henry Thomson of Keillour	1496–1512	Thomson took several diplomatic missions as Lyon. Such as one in 1505, when he was sent to Denmark on behalf of King James IV. Thomson was described by his king as "an experienced councillor" and "a man of much diplomatic skill" had been requested by King John as a mediator (the two kings were cousins), and to inform him that Scotland was unable to send ships to aid him in the Dano-Swedish War. Formerly Islay Herald.	
	Sir William Cumming of Inverallochy	1512–1519	Cumming took an important ultimatum from James IV to Henry VIII arriving at his camp in Thérouanne, France, on 11 August 1513. Henry's angry exchange with Cumming was recorded. Henry's rejection of the terms led to a declaration of war between the two countries, as a result he was not present at the defeat at Flodden. He was however present at the coronation of the infant James V on 21 September 1513. In 1514 Cumming was involved in a fracas with Lord Drummond, when he was appointed to deliver a charge citing the Earl of Angus, to appear before the Council regarding his marriage with Margaret Tudor, the widow of James IV. During the course of this mission Cumming was struck by Lord Drummond (the earl's grandfather) and due to the sanctity of the King of Arms' office, Lord Drummond was confined to Blackness Castle and had all his estates forfeited. After suffering several months of imprisonment, Lord Drummond was later released and had the charges removed. Formerly Marchmont Herald.	
	Thomas Pettigrew of Magdalensyde	1519–1542	Much is not known about Pettigrew except that during much of his tenure he was deemed unfit to discharge his duties and his functions were actually performed by Sir David Lindsay of the Mount, who succeeded to the full title on Pettigrew's death in 1542. Formerly Angus Herald.	
	Sir David Lindsay of the Mount	1542–1554	Appointed Lyon King of Arms, with an annual grant out of the lands of Luthrie in Fife, as his fee. The brilliant Lindsay thus became doubly the head of the heralds and poet laureate of the Scottish court. In the former capacity he took part in several embassies of the reign, while in the latter he expressed with the greatest freedom his views on the reformation of church and state, and became the poet of the Scottish Reformation. In June 1531 Lindsay went on his first embassy as Lyon king to the court of the Emperor Charles V. The embassy, which was appointed by the parliament in the preceding April, obtained a renewal of the alliance between Scotland and the Netherlands for a second term of 100 years. 'The Register of Arms of the Scottish Nobility and Gentry’ was completed under his direction as Lord Lyon in 1542. However the manuscript remained unpublished until 1821 when it was printed from the Advocates Library. Formerly Snawdoun Herald.	
	Sir Robert Forman of Luthrie	1555–1567	Forman was made a pursuivant in 1540, and created Ross Herald in November of the same year. In 1561 he received the appointment of Lyon from Queen Mary, in which it is stated he had filled the office with great ability during her "umquhill deirest moderis tyme." He received his salary from the lands of Rathillet, as most of his predecessors had theirs from Collessie. He reigned till 1567, when he probably retired, as he did not die for some years later. He compiled the voluminous 'Register of Lord Lyon', which consisted of several armorial registers bounded together.	
	Sir William Stewart of Luthrie	20 February 1567	Stewart was formerly Ross Herald, and his commission as Lyon under the Privy Seal was dated on 20 February 1568. He was stripped of his office (after being in it for less than six months) and then convicted for attempting the murder of the regent, the Earl of Moray. Sir James Balfour writes that he was "transported from Edinburgh Castle to Dumbrittane and ther committed to closse prissone, for conspyring to take the Regent's lyffe by sorcery and necromancy, for which he was put to death." He was in fact burned at the stake in St Andrews on the 16 August 1569. The charge against Stewart, though nominally witchcraft, was no doubt politically motivated, due to his opposition to Moray and loyalty to Queen Mary of Guise.	
	Sir David Lindsay of Rathillet	13 September 1568 – 1591	Younger half-brother of Sir David Lindsay of the Mount. In 1545 he was Dingwall Pursuivant and created Rothesay Herald in 1557. He became Lyon in 1568, and was crowned with great solemnity in presence of the regent and many nobles. Dying in 1591, he was succeeded by his nephew another Sir David Lindsay of the Mount.	
	Sir David Lindsay of the Mount (Secundus)	25 December 1591 – 1620	The second David Lindsay was a son of the first's half-brother, Alexander Lindsay. He was crowned on 2 May 1592, with James VI himself placing the ancient crown of Scotland on his head. He wore this also, as he told Sir William Segar Garter King of Arms, on the same day at dinner with the king. According to the Book of Caerlaverock he was raised to the dignity of a Lord of Parliament at the time of the accession of James to the throne of England. He was a good herald, and a volume of his collections dated 1586, is in the Advocates Library. He resigned in favour of his son-in-law the next holder in 1620, and died two years afterwards.	
	Sir Jerome Lindsay of Annatland	8 November 1620 – 1630	Lindsay of Dunino and Annatland had married his predecessor's daughter, and succeeded through her to the estate of the Mount. He was the last of the Lindsay dynasty in the office of Lyon. Of his official acts there is little record. His commission was dated 8 November 1620, and he reigned for ten years, when he resigned office at the age of sixty-eight.	
	Sir James Balfour of Denmilne and Kinnaird, 1st Baronet	20 April 1630 – 1654	Balfour received his commission as a young man in 1630, without having gone through any of the lower heraldic offices, and was crowned at Holyrood by the Viscount Dupplin, the Lord Chancellor. He was well suited for the role and cultivated friendships with fellow heralds such as Sir William Segar, who described him as "ane expert and graduate herauld in blazing of cotts and armories, in inventing of crests and supporters, in searching of genealogies and discents, in marshalling of funeralls, triumphs, and inaugurations, etc., and in all ceremonies whatsoever pertaining to honour or amies." In 1633 he was created a Baronet by Charles I. Sir James Balfour Paul said of him: "it is sufficient to say that few more accomplished men ever held the office of Lyon." He reigned as Lyon during turbulent times and he was deprived of his kingly office by Oliver Cromwell.	
	Sir James Campbell of Lawers	13 May 1658 – 1660	Oliver Cromwell, while he abolished the monarchy, did not extend the same fate to the crown heraldic, for he appointed two Lyons in his day. The first of these was Sir James Campbell of Lawers, who was commissioned to be "Lyon our Herald King of Arms," at Westminster on 13 May 1658. He was very soon followed by Gilbert Stewart, of whom we know nothing, save that he was deprived of office at the Restoration.	
	Sir Alexander Durham of Largo	28 August 1660 – 1663	Received his appointment on account of his services to the Royalist party in Scotland. His reign was not a long one, as he died in 1663.	
	Sir Charles Erskine of Cambo, Baronet	4 January 1663 – 1677	Appointed by Charles II in 1663. He succeeded in getting his son conjoined with him as a kind of "assistant and successor" on 27 June 1677. Sir Charles established the official Public Register of All Arms and Bearings. The fate of the old registers not having been known, perhaps they were burnt, lost at sea or looted when many books were taken by Cromwell or his armies to London. Despite repeated representations of the Scottish Parliament none were found. Sir Charles died in 1677.	
	Sir Alexander Erskine of Cambo, 2nd Baronet	1677–1726	Due to the arrangement in 1677, Sir Charles was succeeded by his son Alexander. An efficient officer, in 1702 he got a patent under the Great Seal to give the Lyon office to himself and his son (also named Alexander), declaring the office to be hereditary in his family. However his son predeceased him. He took part in the Jacobite rising of 1715, perhaps induced into it by his kinsman the Earl of Mar. He died in 1735, but he may have been deprived of office long before that.	
	Alexander Brodie, 19th of that Ilk	6 July 1727 – 1754	Elected a Member of Parliament (MP) for Elginshire in 1720, the laird of Brodie was an enthusiastic supporter of the government of Robert Walpole. He was rewarded with the Lyon office with a salary of £300 per year (equivalent to £53,000 in 2025). Brodie fulfilled the office with diligence. He was reputed to have enforced the laws of arms without fear or favour, and removed bogus arms even from senior peers. Despite being an informer for the Hanoverian regime, he was magnanimous to staff in the Lyon office who had supported the Jacobites. He intervened to protect them from punishment, ensured that their salaries were reinstated, and won a pardon from a death sentence for one of his clerks.	
	John Hooke-Campbell of Bangeston	3 April 1754 – 1795	A Campbell of Cawdor, and a nephew of Lord Cawdor. He probably inherited his Welsh estates through his mother's family and recorded arms in the Lyon Register with the name Campbell Hooke. He was seldom in Edinburgh, especially in the later part of his tenure of office. He met a sudden death in 1795.	
	Robert Boswell of St. Boswells	1795–1796	From 1770 the Lyon Clerk and Lyon Depute was Robert Boswell, who was a cousin of James Boswell, Samuel Johnson’s biographer. As Lyon Depute, Robert Boswell signed the grant of arms to the University of Edinburgh in 1789. After the death of John Hooke Campbell, Boswell was Lyon ad interim until the appointment of Lord Kinnoull.	
	Robert Aureol Hay-Drummond, 10th Earl of Kinnoull	26 May 1796 – 1804	Born in 1751, his father was Robert Hay Drummond, the Archbishop of York. In 1739, his father took on the Drummond name and arms as heir of entail of his great-grandfather Viscount Strathallan. Robert Hay-Drummond succeeded to the title of Earl of Kinnoull on 27 December 1787 on the death of his uncle, Thomas Hay. In 1796 he was sworn into the Privy Council and made Lord Lyon. He died in 1804. During his tenure the Lyon office became a sinecure and the heraldic tasks of the office were performed by a Lyon Depute.	
	Thomas Robert Hay-Drummond, 11th Earl of Kinnoull	12 April 1804 – 1866	Born in Bath, Somerset, to the 10th Earl and his second wife, Sarah Harley, daughter of Thomas Harley, Lord Mayor of London. He succeeded his father as Lord Lyon in 1804 although, like his father before him, he took no interest in heraldic work. He served as colonel of the Perthshire Militia from 1809 to 1855, and from 1830 to 1866 he was Lord Lieutenant of Perthshire. He died in Torquay in 1866.	
	George Burnett	26 July 1866 – 1890	Born in 1822, he was the second son of John Burnett, 5th Laird of Kemnay. Burnett was admitted a member of the Scottish Bar in 1845. In 1863 he was appointed Lyon Depute; in this position he was practically the head of the heraldic executive in Scotland. Three years later he succeeded Lord Kinnoull as Lord Lyon, an office to which he was pre-eminently qualified. For nearly a quarter of a century he administered the office wisely and well, and made it once more an efficient and reliable heraldic court.	
	Sir James Balfour Paul	12 March 1890 – 1926	Born in 1846. He was educated at Royal High School and the University of Edinburgh. He was admitted an advocate in 1870. Thereafter he was Registrar of Friendly Societies (1879–1890), Treasurer of the Faculty of Advocates (1883–1902), and appointed Lord Lyon in 1890. He was created a Knight Bachelor in the 1900. Shortly before his retirement in 1926, he was appointed a Knight Commander of the Royal Victorian Order. He was also admitted an Esquire and then a Commander of the Order of St. John of Jerusalem, elected a Fellow of the Society of Antiquaries of Scotland and was also the Secretary of the Order of the Thistle.	
	George Sitwell Campbell Swinton	1927–1929	Born in 1859. Swinton began his career in the army and was gazetted to the 71st (Highland) Regiment of Foot in 1878. He was an aide-de-camp to the Viceroy of India from 1888 to 1894. As a Conservative he served on various municipal offices. Swinton also served as March Pursuivant. He was Albany Herald from 1923 to 1926 and served as Lord Lyon and Secretary to the Order of the Thistle from 1927 to 1929.	
	Sir Francis James Grant	1929–1945	Born in 1863, the son of John Grant, Marchmont Herald from 1884 to 1888, Grant served as Carrick Pursuivant beginning on 17 May 1886. This appointment lasted until his promotion to the office of Rothesay Herald and Lyon Clerk and Keeper of the Records on 8 September 1898. On 10 May 1929, he was appointed Lord Lyon. In 1935 he was made a Knight Commander of the Royal Victorian Order. Grant retired from the office on 30 June 1945.	
	Sir Thomas Innes of Learney	1945–1969	Thomas Innes was born in 1893. Learney served as Carrick Pursuivant from 1926 to 1935 and as Albany Herald from 1935 to 1945. He was appointed Lord Lyon on 18 June 1945, until his retirement in 1969. On 10 June 1967 he was appointed a Knight Grand Cross of the Royal Victorian Order.	
	Sir James Monteith Grant	1969–1981	Born in 1903. Educated at the Edinburgh Academy and the University of Edinburgh, where he studied law, he was appointed a Writer to the Signet in 1927. He served as Carrick Pursuivant from 1946 to 1957 and as Marchmont Herald 1957–1969. He was appointed Lord Lyon in 1969, until his retirement in 1981. In 1969 he was appointed a Knight Commander of the Royal Victorian Order.	
	Sir Malcolm Rognvald Innes of Edingight	1981–2001	Born in 1938, the son of Thomas Innes of Learney. He served as Falkland Pursuivant from 1957 to 1958, then as Carrick Pursuivant from 1958 to 1971 and as Marchmont Herald from 1971 to 1981. He was Lyon Clerk and Keeper of the Records from 1966 to 1981. He was appointed Lord Lyon in 1981, until his retirement in 2001. Following this he was appointed Orkney Herald. He is also a Fellow, former president, and co-founder of the Heraldry Society of Scotland, as well as being Honorary President of the Scottish Genealogy Society. In 1990 he was appointed a Knight Commander of the Royal Victorian Order.	
	Robin Orr Blair	2001–2008	Born in 1940. Blair is a retired solicitor, and was a partner with Dundas & Wilson CS and later with Turcan Connell. He was appointed Lord Lyon on 9 February 2001, the first to have been appointed in accordance with the European Union's rules for appointments to the public service and the first senior member of the Royal Household in Scotland to have been appointed by the Scottish Executive rather than Whitehall. He was appointed after the position was publicly advertised. He retired in 2008. In the same year he retired he was appointed a Commander of the Royal Victorian Order.	
	William David Hamilton Sellar	2008–2014	Born in 1941. Sellar read history at Oxford University graduating as Bachelor of Arts before gaining a law degree (LLB) from the University of Edinburgh. He qualified as a solicitor in 1966, and in 1968 joined the Faculty of Law at the University of Edinburgh, where he was elected an Honorary Fellow in 1997. He was appointed Lord Lyon in 2008, until his retirement in 2014. In the same year he retired he was appointed a Member of the Royal Victorian Order.	
	The Reverend Canon Dr. Joseph John Morrow	2014–present	Morrow is a member of the Faculty of Advocates, with degrees in Theology and Law. He was appointed Lord Lyon on 17 January 2014, and sworn in before the Lord President of the Court of Session on 27 February 2014.	

=== Lyon Deputes ===
Arms	Name	Date of appointment	Notes
	Sir William Cumming of Inverallochy	1508	Also Marchmont Herald
	Sir David Lindsay of the Mount	1528	Also Snawdoun
	Sir Robert Forman of Luthrie	1554	Also Ross
	Sir David Lindsay of the Mount (Secundus)	1568	
	Thomas Lindesay	1591	Also Snawdoun
	Thomas Drysdale	1627	Also Islay
	Laurence Oliphant	31 January 1631	Advocate
	Harry Maule of Melgund	(1636)	
	Sir David Balfour	20 March 1650	Advocate, afterwards Knight and Lord of Session
	Sir John Baird, Lord Newbyth	15 August 1663	Advocate, afterwards Lord of Session
	William Thomson of Fairliehope	4 January 1666	
	James Skene	10 November 1677	(Joint); Also Kintyre
	Robert Innes of Blairtoun	4 November 1677	(Joint, then sole from 10 November 1687)
	James Douglas of Earnslaw	5 May 1689	
	David Erskine	6 June 1724	Also Rothesay.
	John Dundas of Newhalls	1 November 1728	
	Thomas Dundas of Fingask	18 June 1744	Member of Parliament for Orkney and Shetland
	Thomas Brodie	30 August 1754	
	Robert Boswell of St. Boswells	2 November 1770	After the death of John Hooke Campbell in 1795, Boswell was Lyon ad interim until the appointment of Lord Kinnoull in 1796.
	James Home of Linhouse	8 August 1796	
	David Clyne	21 February 1819	(Interim)
	George Tait	24 April 1819	(Interim)
	George Clerk Craigie of Dumbarnie	1 April 1823	Advocate
	James Tytler of Woodhouselee	2 June 1827	(Joint, then sole from 1845)
	George Burnett	9 November 1863	Appointed Lord Lyon King of Arms in 1866 and served in that post until his death in 1890.
Office abolished in 1866.

== Coat of arms ==
Coat of arms of Lord Lyon King of Arms
Helm Above the Shield is placed the proper Crown of the Lyon, being precisely after the model of the Crown of Scotland yet not set with stones but only enamel Escutcheon Argent a lion sejant guardant Gules armed and Iangued Azure holding in his dexter paw a thistle Proper and in his sinister a shield of the second; on a chief Azure a St. Andrew's cross of the first. Supporters On a compartment below the Shield are set the proper Supporters of the Lord Lyon King of Arms. two lions rampant guardant Gules armed and langued Azure each crowned with the proper crown of the Lord Lyon King of Arms, their bodies semee of thistles crowned Or. Other elements Behind the Shield are disposed in saltire two representations of the Batons of the Lord Lyon King of Arms, videlicet: Azure, tipped Or, that on the dexter semee of thistles, roses, harps and fleurs de lys also Or (as Lord Lyon King of Arms), that on the sinister semee of thistles and St. Andrew’s Crosses of the Last (as King of Arms of the Most Ancient and Most Noble Order of the Thistle) Badge Argent a lion sejant guardant Gules armed and Iangued Azure holding in his dexter paw a thistle Proper and in his sinister a shield of the second; on a chief Azure a St. Andrew's cross of the first. Around the Shield is placed the Lord Lyon’s Collar of Thistles linked with sprigs of rue interwoven Or and having from it pendent by a Scottish Imperial Crown Proper an oval medallion Or displaying the figure of Saint Andrew vested Vert surcoat Purpure bearing before him the cross of his martyrdom Argent.

== See also ==
- King of Arms
- Garter Principal King of Arms
- Clarenceux King of Arms
- Norroy and Ulster King of Arms

== Statutory acts ==
- Lyon King of Arms Act 1592
- Lyon King of Arms Act 1669
- Lyon King of Arms Act 1672
- Lyon King of Arms Act 1867
- The Superannuation (Lyon King of Arms and Lyon Clerk) Order 1979
