= Bute Pursuivant =

Scottish officer of arms

- The heraldic badge of Bute Pursuivant of Arms
- Heraldic tradition: Gallo-British
- Jurisdiction: Scotland
- Governing body: Court of the Lord Lyon

Bute Pursuivant of Arms is a Scottish pursuivant of arms of the Court of the Lord Lyon.

The title of the office derives from the Isle of Bute, which was the personal property of the Scottish monarchs.

The badge of office is A lymphad Sable, flagged Gules in full sail Or charged of a fess chequy Azure and Argent, the yard surmounted of a coronet of four fleur-de-lys (two visible) and four crosses pattee (one and two halves visible) Or.

As of 2024, the current holder of the office is Colin Russell (latterly Falkland Pursuivant Extraordinary).

== Holders of the office ==
Arms	Name	Date of appointment	Ref
	Robert Hart	1528	
	Peter Thomson	1535	
	Adam MacCulloch	1554	
	John Calder	1561	
	John Binsele	1590	
	William MacKiesoun	1598	
	Eleazor Mackesone	1616	
	John Thomson	1636	
	William Malcolm	1647	
	James Alisone	1661	
	John Hoge	1675	
	John Wright	1704	
	Sir Charles Erskine of Cambo, Baronet	1707	
	George Glass	1715	
	Alexander Thomson	1724	
	John Douglas	1765	
	George Douglas of Torquhine	1768	
	Archibald Campbell	1776	
	Alexander Law	1796	
	Daniel Menzies	1821	
	Ebenezer Macgeorge	1822	
	David Littlejohn	1833	
	William Goodall Bayley	1838	
	Walter Ferguson	1851	
	Robert Spence Livingstone	1884	
	Andrew Munro Ross	1885	
	John Thomas Loth	1888	
	James Keir Lamont	1899	
	Vacant	1901–2001	
	William David Hamilton Sellar	2001–2008	
	Vacant	2008–2024	
	Colin Russell	2024–Present	

== See also ==
- Officer of Arms
- Pursuivant
- Court of the Lord Lyon
- Heraldry Society of Scotland
