= Charles Shaw of Tordarroch =

British Army officer, Scottish officer of arms and clan chief

The arms of Charles Shaw of Tordarroch

Charles John Shaw-Mackenzie of Tordarroch, 7th of Newhall MBE TD DL (3 March 1899 – 2 August 1978) was a British Army officer, Scottish officer of arms and clan chief.

Shaw was the son of John Alexander Shaw-Mackenzie of Tordarroch, 6th of Newhall and Frances Yule. He was educated at Charterhouse School, before joining the British Army. He was commissioned into the Seaforth Highlanders in 1918 having attended the Royal Military College, Sandhurst. In 1924 he was appointed a Military Member of the Order of the British Empire. He was promoted to Captain in 1928. In 1934 he was appointed a Deputy Lieutenant for Ross and Cromarty. He fought in the Second World War, during which he was taken prisoner in the Battle of France in 1940; he was repatriated in September 1944. Shaw was Mentioned in Dispatches in 1945. He was awarded the Efficiency Decoration in 1948.

In November 1958 Shaw matriculated his arms in the Court of the Lord Lyon and in 1970 he was recognised by Lord Lyon King of Arms as the 21st Chief of Clan Shaw. He held the office of Falkland Pursuivant in 1966. He was a member of the Royal Company of Archers.

Shaw was a Fellow of the Royal Geographical Society and the Society of Antiquaries of Scotland.

Heraldic offices
Preceded by David Boyle	Falkland Pursuivant; 1966	Succeeded by David Maitland-Titterton
