= David Maitland-Titterton =

David Maitland Maitland-Titterton TD (1904 – 1988) was a Scottish British Army officer and officer of arms.

Maitland-Titterton was a commissioned officer in the Ayrshire Yeomanry and retired with the honorary rank of major in 1964. He was an officer of arms in the Court of the Lord Lyon, serving as Falkland Pursuivant from 1969 to 1971, Ormond Pursuivant from 1971 to 1982 and Marchmont Herald between 1982 and his death in 1988.

Heraldic offices
Preceded by Charles Shaw of Tordarroch	Falkland Pursuivant; 1969–1971	Succeeded by Lord James Douglas-Hamilton
Preceded by John Brown	Ormond Pursuivant; 1971–1982	Succeeded by Mark Dennis
Preceded by James Monteith Grant	Marchmont Herald; 1982–1988	Succeeded by Adam Bruce
