= David Reid of Robertland, Baron of Robertland =

Scottish barrister, officer of arms and archivist

Arms of David Reid of Robertland

David John Wilson Reid of Robertland, Baron of Robertland (1929 – 20 December 1973) was a Scottish barrister, officer of arms and archivist.

Reid studied law at Trinity College, Cambridge and The Hague Academy of International Law. Between 1955 and 1973 he was archivist at the University of Glasgow, and he was a founder and chairman of the Business Archives Council of Scotland. He was a Fellow of the Society of Antiquaries of Scotland. In 1967 he was adopted as prospective parliamentary candidate for the Conservatives for the constituency of West Fife. Reid was Carrick Pursuivant of the Court of the Lord Lyon between January and December 1973. He held the Barony of Robertland in East Ayrshire.

He married Diana Rosamond Angell, secretary of the Baronetage of Scotland; their daughter Jonet Clemency Wilson Reid married Sir Edward Hunter-Blair, 8th Baronet.

Heraldic offices
Preceded by Sir Malcolm Innes of Edingight	Carrick Pursuivant; 1973	Succeeded by John Alexander Spens
