= Sir Duncan Campbell, 3rd Baronet =

Scottish British Army officer, historian and officer of arms (1856-1926)

Arms of Sir Duncan Campbell, Baronet

Sir Duncan Alexander Dundas Campbell, 3rd Baronet CVO (4 December 1856 – 27 May 1926) was a Scottish British Army officer, historian and officer of arms.

Campbell was the son of Sir Alexander Campbell, 2nd Baronet and Harriette Augusta Royer Collier, and he succeeded to his father's title on 11 December 1880. He served as an officer in the Black Watch. Between 1884 and 1895 he was Gentleman Usher of the Green Rod. Campbell retired from the army in 1893, with the rank of Honorary Major, late of the 3rd and 4th Battalion Highland Light Infantry. From 1907 until his death in 1926, he was Carrick Pursuivant of the Court of the Lord Lyon and was a member of the Royal Company of Archers. Campbell was appointed a Commander of the Royal Victorian Order in the 1909 Birthday Honours while serving as Secretary to the Order of the Thistle.

Campbell was the author of several books, including The Clan Campbell, Records of Clan Campbell in the Military Service of the Honourable East India Company from 1600-1858 and Officers of the Clan Campbell in Army and Royal Marines from 1660–1924.

Heraldic offices
Preceded by William Rae Macdonald	Carrick Pursuivant; 1907–1926	Succeeded by Sir Thomas Innes
Baronetage of the United Kingdom
Preceded by Alexander Campbell	Baronet (of Barcaldine and Glenure); 1880–1926	Succeeded by Alexander Campbell
