= David Boyle (diplomat) =

British diplomat & intelligence officer (1883-1970)

David Hugh Montgomerie Boyle CMG (1 September 1883 – 5 October 1970) was a British diplomat, intelligence officer and officer of arms.

== Biography ==
Boyle was the son of Henry David Boyle, who was involved in mining in Rhodesia and Russia, and Emma Chambres Robinson. After being educated at Wellington College, Berkshire, he briefly attended New College, Oxford but left before graduating in order to take the Civil Service examinations. He subsequently worked for the Chinese Customs Service in Peking, and in Ceylon and Burma.

In 1911 he was made Gold Staff Officer to the Earl Marshal, and officiated at the coronations of George V, George VI and Elizabeth II.

In 1912 he was made an Assistant District Commissioner in the Gold Coast. In October 1914 he attempted to join the army, but was directed by the British government to return to Africa. In 1916 he was made Acting District Commissioner in the Ashanti Region and by 1917 he was Assistant Colonial Secretary in Accra. He returned to the UK later in 1917 and was briefly Private Secretary to Sir Everard im Thurn, before leaving the Colonial Office and joining the army; it was likely at this time that he was recruited by the Secret Intelligence Service. He received a commission in the 4th Argyll and Sutherland Highlanders in 1918.

In October 1919, Boyle was posted to the United States and then to Dublin in August 1920 as part of the Auxiliary Division, running the Police Adviser's Office. In January 1921, he took over the running of Auxiliary Division's Special Branch in Dublin, but resigned in September of that year. In February 1922 he was listed in the intelligence section of the Special Reserve of Officers. Between 1922 and 1924 he travelled to Canada, the United States, Japan, China and Malaya. In August 1924 he accompanied the Prince of Wales on a visit to New York as his Assistant Private Secretary.

He subsequently became a company director, including for Anchor Line and Dawnay Day. In 1933 he was removed from the Reserve of Officers upon reaching the age limit. In 1938 he was Personal Assistant to Hugh Sinclair and running Section N at MI6. He was sent to Berlin on 23 August 1939 on the eve of the Second World War, ostensibly as a King's Messenger. He then served as Personal Assistant to Stewart Menzies during the war.

He was appointed a Companion of the Order of St Michael and St George in the 1948 Birthday Honours, his citation stating "attached to a department of the Foreign Office". He was appointed Falkland Pursuivant in Extraordinary in the Court of the Lord Lyon four times, in 1953, 1955, 1962 and 1963.

He married Laura Grant Tennant, daughter of James Tennant and Henrietta Grant Fergusson, on 27 April 1916. Their son was the diplomat Ranald Boyle.

Heraldic offices
Preceded by Don Pottinger	Falkland Pursuivant; June 1953; June–July 1955	Succeeded by Malcolm Innes of Edingight
Preceded by Malcolm Innes of Edingight	Falkland Pursuivant; October 1962; June–July 1963	Succeeded by Charles Shaw of Tordarroch
