= James Douglas-Hamilton, Baron Selkirk of Douglas =

Scottish politician (1942–2023)

The Right Honourable The Lord Selkirk of Douglas PC KC
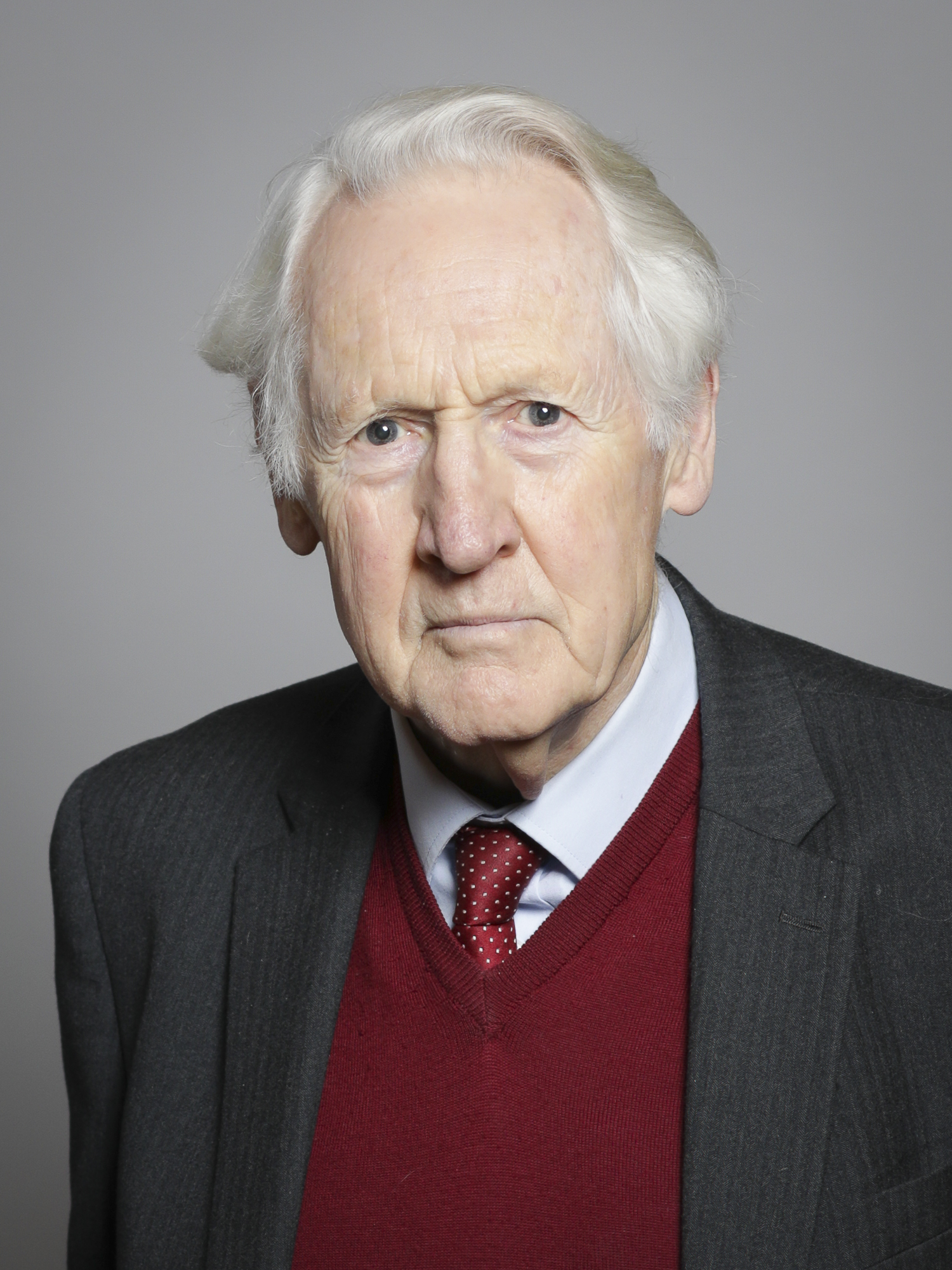
- Official portrait, 2019

Minister of State for Scotland
- In office 6 July 1995 – 2 May 1997
- Prime Minister: John Major
- Preceded by: The Lord Fraser of Carmyllie
- Succeeded by: Brian Wilson

Parliamentary Under-Secretary of State for Scotland
- In office 13 June 1987 – 6 July 1995
- Prime Minister: Margaret Thatcher; John Major
- Preceded by: Michael Ancram
- Succeeded by: Raymond Robertson

Lord Commissioner of the Treasury
- In office 7 May 1979 – 1 October 1981
- Prime Minister: Margaret Thatcher
- Preceded by: Alfred Bates
- Succeeded by: Tony Newton

Member of the Scottish Parliament for Lothians (1 of 7 Regional MSPs)
- In office 6 May 1999 – 2 April 2007

Member of the House of Lords
- Lord Temporal
- Hereditary peerage 24 November 1994 – 1 December 1994 (disclaimed)
- Preceded by: The 10th Earl of Selkirk
- Succeeded by: Seat abolished
- Life peerage 29 September 1997 – 27 July 2023

Member of Parliament for Edinburgh West
- In office 10 October 1974 – 8 April 1997
- Preceded by: Anthony Stodart
- Succeeded by: Donald Gorrie

Personal details
- Born: James Alexander Douglas-Hamilton; 31 July 1942 Dungavel House, Lanarkshire, Scotland
- Died: 28 November 2023 (aged 81)
- Party: Scottish Conservative
- Spouse: Priscilla Susan Buchan (m. 1974)
- Children: 4
- Parents: Douglas Douglas-Hamilton; Lady Elizabeth Percy
- Education: Balliol College, Oxford; University of Edinburgh (LL.B.)

James Alexander Douglas-Hamilton, Baron Selkirk of Douglas, PC, KC (31 July 1942 – 28 November 2023) was a Scottish Conservative politician who served as Member of Parliament (MP) for Edinburgh West and then as a member of the Scottish Parliament (MSP) for the Lothians region. Between 1997 and 2023 he was a member of the House of Lords as a life peer.

In 1994, he was briefly Earl of Selkirk, but disclaimed that peerage to remain in the House of Commons.

== Early life ==
James Alexander Douglas-Hamilton was born at Dungavel House on 31 July 1942, to the 14th Duke of Hamilton and the former Lady Elizabeth Percy. He was educated at Eton and Balliol College, Oxford, where he was president of the Oxford Union, and thereafter at the University of Edinburgh, earning a Bachelor of Laws degree.

== Political career ==
Douglas-Hamilton served as an advocate and an interim Procurator Fiscal Depute from 1968 to 1972. From 1972 to 1974, he was a councillor on Edinburgh District Council, and after unsuccessfully contesting Hamilton in February 1974, from October 1974 to 1997 he was Member of Parliament for Edinburgh West. During this time, he served in the Scottish Office. He was briefly Falkland Pursuivant in the Court of the Lord Lyon in July 1973.

In the years between 1987 and 1995 he served as Parliamentary Under-Secretary of State for Scotland, and thereafter as Minister of State between 1995 and 1997. He had previously been a Lord Commissioner of the Treasury between 1979 and 1981. He was appointed a Privy Counsellor and Queen's Counsel in 1996.

It was announced on 12 December 2011 that he would serve as Lord High Commissioner to the General Assembly of the Church of Scotland (as well as to the Free Church of Scotland), who is the Sovereign's personal representative to the Annual General Assembly of the Church of Scotland, in 2012. He also served the same role at the 2013 General Assembly of the Church of Scotland and Free Church of Scotland.

== Peerage ==
In 1994 on the death of George Nigel Douglas-Hamilton, 10th Earl of Selkirk, Selkirk inherited the earldom, although the succession was disputed, as Alasdair Douglas-Hamilton, a nephew of the 10th Earl, claimed it, ultimately without success. Due to the terms of the Peerage Act 1963, Selkirk was considered to be unable to vote in the House of Commons until he had disclaimed the title, even though the succession to it had not been decided. As the Conservative government of the day had a small majority, he felt obliged to disclaim immediately.

After losing his seat in the 1997 general election, he was elevated to the House of Lords as a life peer, being created Baron Selkirk of Douglas, of Cramond in the City of Edinburgh council area. Lord Selkirk retired from the House of Lords on 27 July 2023.

== Scottish Parliament ==
From 1999 to 2007 he was a member of the Scottish Parliament and was deputy Convener of its Education Committee. In November 2005, Lord Selkirk of Douglas announced his intention to retire at the end of the 2003–2007 session of the Scottish Parliament. He continued to sit in the House of Lords, taking a particular interest in British legislation as it affects Scotland.

== Books ==
Lord Selkirk of Douglas wrote a number of books, including Motive for a Mission: The Story Behind Hess's Flight to Britain about his father's meeting with Rudolf Hess when he landed in Scotland during World War II. He later wrote a biography on Rudolf Hess entitled The Truth About Rudolf Hess (1993).

== Personal life ==
On 24 August 1974 Douglas-Hamilton married Priscilla Susan Buchan, daughter of John Buchan, 2nd Baron Tweedsmuir, and Priscilla Jean Fortescue Thomson, and granddaughter of the politician and novelist John Buchan. They had four sons – John, 12th Earl of Selkirk, Charles, Jamie, and Harry.

Douglas-Hamilton was fifth in line to the Dukedom of Hamilton, after the sons and the brother of the 16th Duke.

His aunt was the pioneer aviator Audrey Sale-Barker, later Countess of Selkirk.

Douglas-Hamilton died of pneumonia on 28 November 2023, at the age of 81.

== See also ==
- Commission on Scottish Devolution

Parliament of the United Kingdom
Preceded by Anthony Stodart	Member of Parliament for Edinburgh West; Oct. 1974 – 1997	Succeeded by Donald Gorrie
Peerage of Scotland
Preceded by George Douglas-Hamilton	Earl of Selkirk; 1994	Disclaimed Title next held by John Douglas-Hamilton
Heraldic offices
Preceded by David Maitland-Titterton	Falkland Pursuivant; 1973	Succeeded by Peter de Vere Beauclerk-Dewar
