= David Sellar =

Scottish legal historian (1941–2019)

William David Hamilton Sellar (27 February 1941 – 26 January 2019) was a legal historian who served as Lord Lyon King of Arms from 2008 to 2014.

Sellar studied history at Oxford University graduating as Bachelor of Arts before gaining a law degree (LLB) from the University of Edinburgh. He qualified as a Scottish solicitor in 1966, and after two years as a legal assessor with the Scottish Land Court joined in 1968 the Faculty of Law at the University of Edinburgh, where he was elected an Honorary Fellow.

Sellar wrote about the Lordship of the Isles and on the origins of many Highland families.

Lord Lyon's official coat of arms

He served as a Member of the Ancient Monuments Board for Scotland, was President of the Scottish Genealogy Society and sat on the council of the Heraldry Society of Scotland, and as Vice-President of the Society of Antiquaries of Scotland. He was the O'Donnell Lecturer, in Celtic Studies, at Edinburgh in 1985 and the Rhind Lecturer for the Society of Antiquaries in 2000. He held the office of Bute Pursuivant of Arms from 2001 until his appointment in 2008 as Lord Lyon King of Arms.

A Fellow of the Society of Antiquaries of Scotland (FSA Scot) and a Fellow of the Royal Historical Society (FRHistS), Sellar was appointed Member of the Royal Victorian Order (MVO) in the 2014 New Year Honours in anticipation of his retirement from the office of Lord Lyon. Upon retirement, he was appointed Islay Herald Extraordinary.

He died on 26 January 2019. His funeral took place in the Lorimer chapel at Warriston Crematorium, Edinburgh, on Saturday 23 February 2019, with standing room only, followed by a reception in the Playfair Library at Edinburgh University.

== Arms ==
Coat of arms of David Sellar
Escutcheon Azure on a Chevron Argent between two cups Or in chief and a smith’s hammer proper shafted Or in base, a book fore-edges Gules.

Heraldic offices
Preceded by James Keir Lamont	Bute Pursuivant; 2001–2008	Succeeded by Colin Russell
Preceded by Robin Blair	Lord Lyon King of Arms; 2008–2013	Succeeded by Joseph Morrow
Preceded by Alastair Campbell of Airds	Islay Herald; 2014–2019	Succeeded by Yvonne Holton
