= George Way of Plean =

Scottish Sheriff (born 1956)

Sheriff The Much Honoured Baron of Plean CStJ
- Born: George Alexander Way; 22 May 1956 (age 70); Scotland
- Occupation: Rothesay Herald
- Title: Sheriff Baron
- Spouse(s): Rosemary, Lady Plean
- Children: 1

Styles of The Sheriff Baron of Plean
- Reference style: The Baron
- Spoken style: Baron or Sheriff

George Alexander Way of Plean, Baron of Plean CStJ is a Scottish Sheriff and former Procurator Fiscal of the Court of the Lord Lyon in Scotland. In November 2015, it was announced that he was to be the first Scottish Sheriff to be appointed a member of the Royal Household in Scotland as Falkland Pursuivant Extraordinary at the Court of the Lord Lyon. In December 2017, he was promoted to Carrick Pursuivant in Ordinary and then to Rothesay Herald in 2024. In 2020, he was appointed Chancellor of the Diocese of Brechin. In June 2021, he was appointed as Genealogist of the Priory of Scotland in the Most Venerable Order of St.John.

== Education and career ==
He is a graduate of the University of Edinburgh and Pembroke College, Oxford. Until 2009, he was a senior partner at the law firm Beveridge and Kellas SSC. He served as Convenor for Civil Justice on the Council of the Law Society of Scotland and is a past president of the Society of Solicitors in the Supreme Courts of Scotland.

Plean succeeded Malcolm Strang-Steel WS as Secretary to the Standing Council of Scottish Chiefs in 1984 and served until 2003, when he stood down in order to carry out his duties as Procurator Fiscal to the Lyon Court impartially. In addition to his specialist work in peerage and heraldic law, he has a strong interest in judicial procedure. He served on the Scottish Courts Rules Council and other regulatory bodies in Scotland, and represented the Sheriffdom of Tayside, Central and Fife on the Sheriffs' Council.

He holds the honorary rank of lieutenant colonel as an external judge advocate in the California Army Reserve, reviewing court-martial procedures.

== Publications ==
His published works include Collins Scottish Clan and Family Encyclopaedia (3rd edition, 2017), Everyday Scots Law, Scottish Clans and Tartans, and The Homelands of the Clans.

== Arms ==
Coat of arms of The Much Hon. Baron of Plean
Crest On a wreath of the liveries, a wyvern wings addorsed Gules gorged of a crest coronet Or supporting with the dexter claw a double knot Sable. Escutcheon Quarterly 1st and 4th Azure three luces haurient Argent in chief and an anchor with the crossbar supporting a pair of balances Or in base (for Way of Plean); 2nd Grand-quarterly the Arms of Romilly Squire 3rd per fess enarched Gules and Or, in chief two Chinese lotus flowers Argent and in base an open crown of the First (for Gauld). Motto VIA UNA COR UNUM ("One way, one heart")

== See also ==
- Heraldry
- Court of the Lord Lyon
- Heraldry Society of Scotland

Baronage of Scotland
Preceded by unknown	Baron of Plean; 1985-present	Succeeded by incumbent

Heraldic offices
Preceded by Peter de Vere Beauclerk-Dewar	Falkland Pursuivant; 2016-2017	Succeeded by Roderick Macpherson
Preceded by Elizabeth Ann Roads	Carrick Pursuivant; 2017–2024	Succeeded by Gillian Black
Preceded by Liam Devlin	Rothesay Herald; 2024-Present	Incumbent
