= James Monteith Grant =

Lord Lyon King of Arms from 1969 to 1981

James Monteith Grant, Lord Lyon King of Arms

Sir James Monteith Grant KCVO KStJ WS FSA Scot FRHSC (Hon) (19 October 1903 – 1 December 1981) was Lord Lyon King of Arms of Scotland from 1969 to 1981.

Educated at the Edinburgh Academy and the University of Edinburgh, where he studied law, he was appointed a Writer to the Signet (WS) in 1927. His first heraldic appointment was as Carrick Pursuivant in 1946. He was promoted to Marchmont Herald in 1957 and then to Lord Lyon in 1969. He was also Secretary to the Order of the Thistle from 1971 until 1981. From his retirement as Lord Lyon in 1981, he again held the post of Marchmont Herald until his death later that year.

He was a Fellow of the Society of Antiquaries of Scotland (FSA Scot), a Knight of the Venerable Order of St John (KStJ) from 1970, and a Commander 2nd Class of the Order of the Polar Star (KNO2kl) of Sweden from 1975. He was appointed a Knight Commander of the Royal Victorian Order (KCVO) in 1969.

== Arms ==
Coat of arms of Sir James Monteith Grant
Adopted Matriculated 31 March 1971 Crest A dexter hand issuant proper, grasping a chevron couped Gules. Escutcheon Argent, a quill pen Or, feathered Gules between two manches Sable, on a chief of the Third three antique crowns of the Second. (the whole ensigned with a King of Arms crown gold, the cap Gules tasselled Or) Supporters On a compartment two black faced rams proper. Motto Adsum

== See also ==
- Officer of Arms
- King of Arms
- The Heraldry Society of Scotland

Heraldic offices
Preceded by Thomas Innes of Learney	Carrick Pursuivant; 1946 – 1957	Succeeded by Malcolm Innes of Edingight
Preceded by John William Balfour Paul	Marchmont Herald; 1957 – 1969	Succeeded by Sir Thomas Innes of Learney
Preceded by Sir Thomas Innes of Learney	Lord Lyon King of Arms; 1969 – 1981	Succeeded by Sir Malcolm Innes of Edingight
Preceded by Sir Malcolm Innes of Edingight	Marchmont Herald; 1981	Succeeded by Maj David Maitland Maitland-Titterington
