= John William Balfour Paul =

Scottish officer of arms (1873–1957)

Lieutenant Colonel John William Balfour Paul DSO (4 June 1873 – 23 April 1957) was a Scottish soldier and officer of arms in the Court of the Lord Lyon.

He was the son of James Balfour Paul and brother of Arthur Forman Balfour Paul, and educated at Sedbergh School. He served in World War I, and was awarded the Distinguished Service Order in 1919.

He was Falkland Pursuivant Extraordinary from 1927 to 1939, and Marchmont Herald from 1939 to 1957. In 1951 he was appointed a Vice-Lieutenant of Midlothian, having been a Deputy Lieutenant for the county since 1931. He was made an Officer of the Order of St John the same year.

Heraldic offices
Preceded by John Horne Stevenson	Marchmont Herald; 1939–1957	Succeeded by James Monteith Grant
Vacant	Falkland Pursuivant; 1927–1939	Succeeded by Sir Iain Moncreiffe
