= John Spens =

Scottish lawyer (1933–2021)

John Alexander Spens MVO RD (7 June 1933 – 14 January 2021) was a Scottish lawyer and officer of arms.

Spens was the son of Thomas Patrick Spens and Nancy Farie Anderson. He was educated at Rugby School, Corpus Christi College, Cambridge and the University of Glasgow.

He was a partner of the legal firm Maclay, Murray and Spens, and a director of Scottish Amicable Life Assurance Society and Standard Property Investment Ltd. He was a commissioned officer in the Royal Naval Reserve, attaining the rank of lieutenant commander and being awarded the Decoration for Officers of the Royal Naval Reserve in 1970. In 1965 he was admitted to the Royal Company of Archers. From 1977 he was a member of the Society of Writers to Her Majesty's Signet.

Spens was Carrick Pursuivant of the Court of the Lord Lyon from 1974 to 1985, and Albany Herald from 1985 to 2011. He became an Officer of the Order of St John in 1988 and he was appointed a Member of the Royal Victorian Order in the 1999 New Year Honours.

He married Finella Jane Gilroy, daughter of Donald Duff Gilroy, on 14 October 1961.

Heraldic offices
Preceded by David Reid of Robertland	Carrick Pursuivant; 1974–1985	Succeeded by Elizabeth Roads
Preceded by Sir Iain Moncreiffe	Albany Herald; 1985–2011	Succeeded by Sir Crispin Agnew, Bt
