= Orkney Herald =

- The heraldic badge of Orkney Herald of Arms
- Heraldic tradition: Gallo-British
- Jurisdiction: Scotland
- Governing body: Court of the Lord Lyon

Orkney Herald of Arms is a Scottish herald of arms in the Court of the Lord Lyon.

The title is locative in origin, from the Orkney Isles or the creation of the Earls of Orkney. It was probably created in late period.

The badge of office is Two dragons’ heads erased and addorsed their necks entwined Or breathing flames of fire Gules all ensigned of the Crown of Scotland Proper.

The office was last held by Sir Malcolm Innes of Edingight, the former Lord Lyon King of Arms. He was appointed to this post on 9 February 2001. The office became vacant upon his death in September 2020.

== Holders of the office ==
Arms	Name	Date of appointment	Ref
	Adam MacCulloch	1571	
	Sir Malcolm Innes of Edingight (Office used in Extraordinary)	2001–2020	
	Vacant	2020–Present	

== See also ==
- Officer of Arms
- Herald
- Court of the Lord Lyon
- Heraldry Society of Scotland
