= Malcolm Innes of Edingight =

Lord Lyon King of Arms of Scotland (1938–2020)

The heraldic achievement of the Office of the Lord Lyon King of Arms.

Sir Malcolm Rognvald Innes of Edingight KCVO WS FSA Scot (25 May 1938 – 20 September 2020) was Lord Lyon King of Arms of Scotland from 1981 until 2001.

== Early life ==
He was the son of Sir Thomas Innes of Learney (Lord Lyon from 1945 to 1969) and Lady Lucy Buchan, daughter of Norman Macleod Sinclair, 18th Earl of Caithness. He was educated at Edinburgh Academy and at the University of Edinburgh where he studied law.

== Career ==
He was appointed a Writer to the Signet in 1964. His first heraldic appointment was as Falkland Pursuivant of Arms Extraordinary from 1957 to 1958, then as Carrick Pursuivant of Arms in Ordinary from 1958 to 1971 and as Marchmont Herald of Arms in Ordinary from 1971 to 1981.

He was Lyon Clerk and Keeper of the Records from 1966 to 1981. He was Lord Lyon King of Arms from 1981 to 2001, also holding the office of Secretary to the Order of the Thistle for the same period.

Following his retirement in 2001, he was appointed Orkney Herald of Arms Extraordinary. He was also a Fellow, former president, and co-founder of the Heraldry Society of Scotland, as well as being Honorary President of the Scottish Genealogy Society until 19 February 2007, when he retired after many years in that position.

Innes of Edingight was appointed a CVO in the 1981 Birthday Honours and promoted to KCVO in 1990. He was a member of the Royal Company of Archers from 1971, and was a Grand Officer of Merit of the Sovereign Military Order of Malta.

He died in September 2020 at the age of 82 from cancer.

== Arms ==
Coat of arms of Sir Malcolm Innes of Edingight
| Escutcheon Argent three mullets Azure, a bordure chequy of the second and first. |

== See also ==
- Heraldry
- Pursuivant
- Herald
- King of Arms

Heraldic offices
| Preceded by David Boyle | Falkland Pursuivant; 1957 – 1958 | Succeeded by David Boyle |
| Preceded by Sir James Grant | Carrick Pursuivant; 1958 – 1971 | Succeeded by David Reid of Robertland |
| Preceded by Harold Andrew Balvaird Lawson | Lyon Clerk and Keeper of the Records; 1966-1981 | Succeeded by Don Pottinger |
| Preceded by Sir Thomas Innes of Learney | Marchmont Herald; 1971 – 1981 | Succeeded by Sir James Grant |
| Preceded by Sir James Monteith Grant | Lord Lyon King of Arms; 1981 – 2001 | Succeeded by Robin Orr Blair |
