= Romilly Squire of Rubislaw =

Romilly Squire of Rubislaw (3 May 1953 – 7 December 2016) was an heraldic artist and designer and expert on Scottish heraldry. He acquired the feudal superiority of Rubislaw in Aberdeen and thus acquired the suffix "of Rubislaw". The hatchment of his personal arms carried at his funeral procession was painted by the Ormond Pursuivant. His ashes were placed near the grave of his 4th great grandfather William Squire at Whitechapel Church, Cleckheaton, and his hatchment within the church.
