= Thomas Innes of Learney =

Scottish officer of arms (1893-1971)

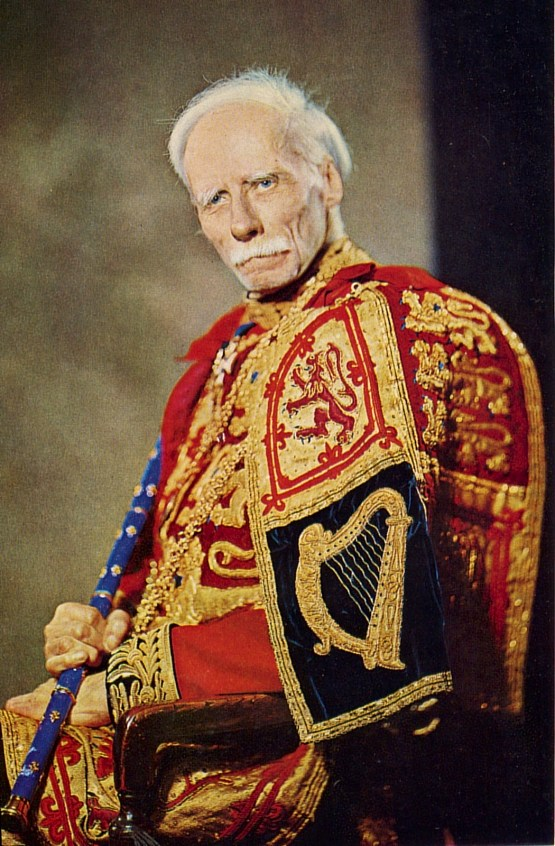
Sir Thomas Innes of Learney

The heraldic achievement of the Office of the Lord Lyon King of Arms.

Sir Thomas Innes of Learney GCVO WS (26 August 1893 – 16 October 1971) was a Scottish officer of arms who was Lord Lyon from 1945 to 1969.

== Life ==
Innes was born in 1893. He succeeded his grandfather as Laird of Learney at the age of 17.

He studied law at Edinburgh University and in 1922, he became an advocate in Scotland.

He was Carrick Pursuivant and Albany Herald in the 1920s and 1930s. In 1928, he married Lady Lucy Buchan, sister of the heiress of Auchmacov and daughter of the 18th Earl of Caithness.

In 1945, he succeeded Sir Francis Grant as Secretary of the Order of the Thistle and Lord Lyon King of Arms. He was a very active Lord Lyon, strongly promoting his views of what his office was through his writings and pronouncements in his Court. In 1950, he convinced the Scots Law Times to start publishing the decisions made in Lyon Court. By ruling on uncontested petitions, he was able to expound many of his theories in court but not under review of his superior court, and get them published in the judicial record. His treatise, Scots Heraldry, was first published in 1934 when he was Carrick Pursuivant; then a second, enlarged edition came out in 1956, and it has practically eclipsed earlier works on the subject. Following his retirement as Lord Lyon in 1969, he was appointed Marchmont Herald, and continued as Secretary of the Order of the Thistle until 1971.

Innes of Learney's writings contain a number of theories which, at a time when English armorial law had come to dominate even Scottish heraldry, may have seemed quite novel, despite his claims that they were grounded in Scotland's feudal past. Most notable is the claim that a grant of arms in Scotland confers what he calls "noblesse" and equates with nobility in the original sense, namely basic untitled nobility possessed by everyone noble, from Gentleman to Duke – though the word is nowadays generally taken to mean exclusively the Peerage, which is why the French word noblesse seemed to him a better term. There are also other claims, such as his right to decide disputes over chiefships of clans or branches of clans, his right to decide disputes of precedence, his right to confer nobility to non-physical persons such as corporations or associations, etc. These rights are still (2007) being exercised by the Court of the Lord Lyon. As a jurist, in 'Scots Heraldry' and in his revision of Adam's The Clans, Septs and Regiments of the Scottish Highlands as well as in The Tartans of the Clans and Families of Scotland he offers evidence from ancient legal documents as well as more recent parliament and court decisions to support his position.

Innes was appointed a Knight Commander of the Royal Victorian Order (KCVO) in the 1946 Birthday Honours and a Knight Grand Cross of the same Order in the 1967 Birthday Honours.

He was senior vice-president of the Scottish Genealogy Society and a member of the Council of the Scottish History Society and the Scottish Record Society. Innes died in Edinburgh at age 78 on Saturday 16 October 1971.

== Written works ==
- Armorial Conveyancing (by Learney as Albany Herald, in: Notes and Queries.1941; 180: 128–133).
- Adams, Frank, revised by Sir Thomas Innes of Learney, Lord Lyon King of Arms, The Clans, Septs and Regiments of the Scottish Highlands, 4th ed. Edinburgh & London 1952. (First published 1908, 2nd ed. 1924, 3rd ed. 1934) [Important and authoritative additions by Learney as the Lord Lyon King of Arms.]
- "Law of Succession in Ensigns Armorial" (in: Notes and Queries?).
- Scots Heraldry, W. & A.K. Johnston Limited, Edinburgh & London: 1938. 2nd ed. revised and enlarged, Edinburgh & London 1956. 3rd ed. revised by Malcolm R. Innes of Edingight, Marchmont Herald (his son, later Lord Lyon King of Arms) London & Edinburgh 1978.
- The Tartans of the Clans and Families of Scotland, 1st ed. 1938, 2nd ed. 1945, 3rd ed. 1947, 4th ed. 1948, 5th ed. 1950, reprinted 1952, 6th ed. 1958, 7th ed. Edinburgh & London 1964.
- The Scottish Tartans with Historical Sketches of the Clans and Families of Scotland. The Arms of Chiefs of Clans and Families and Clansmen's Badges, Illustrated by William Semple. W. & A. K. Johnston & G. W. Bacon Ltd., Edinburgh and London, revised and reprinted edition 1966.

== Arms ==
Coat of arms of Sir Thomas Innes of Learney
Adopted Matriculated 3 April 1916 Crest For dexter Crest, a boar's head erased proper, langued Gules, accompanied by two palm branches also proper, one on either side of the head, and, for sinister crest, a cubit arm in armour, the hand naked holding a dart point downwards, proper between two wings erect Or, each charged with a fess Ermine. Escutcheon Quarterly, 1st and 4th, Argent, three mullets Azure, within a bordure chequy of the Second and First, charged with as many crescents Gules for difference (for Innes); 2nd Gules, three boar's heads erased Or, armed proper, langued Sable (for Aberchirder of that Ilk); 3rd Or, a fess Ermine between three griffins' heads erased Vert, langued Gules (for Brebner of Learney). Motto Ornatur Radix Fronde

== See also ==
- Heraldry
- Pursuivant
- Herald

Heraldic offices
Preceded by Sir Duncan Campbell, Bt	Carrick Pursuivant; 1926–1935	Succeeded by James Monteith Grant
Preceded by Sir Thomas Wolseley Haig	Albany Herald; 1935–1945	Succeeded by Sir Francis James Grant
Preceded by Sir Francis James Grant	Lord Lyon King of Arms; 1945–1969	Succeeded by Sir James Monteith Grant
Preceded by Sir James Monteith Grant	Marchmont Herald; 1969–1971	Succeeded by Malcolm Innes of Edingight
