= Marchmont Herald =

Scottish officer of arms at the Court of the Lord Lyon

- The heraldic badge of Marchmont Herald of Arms
- Heraldic tradition: Gallo-British
- Jurisdiction: Scotland
- Governing body: Court of the Lord Lyon

Banner of the Marchmont Herald

Marchmont Herald of Arms is a current Scottish herald of arms of the Court of the Lord Lyon (there are six herald titles but only three heralds at any one time)

The office was first mentioned in 1438, and the title is derived from the royal castle of Marchmont, an older name for Roxburgh Castle in the Scottish Borders.

The badge of office is A tower of three castellations Vert masoned Argent, the dexter castellation Azure charged of a saltire Argent the sinister castellation Argent charged of a cross Gules, all ensigned of the Crown of Scotland Proper..

The office is currently held by The Hon. Adam Bruce, WS. He was appointed to this post on 2 April 2012.

== Holders of the office ==
Arms	Name	Date of appointment	Ref
	David Weymyss	1482	
	Sir William Cumming of Inverallochy	1494	
	John Meldrum	1515	
	Adam or Alexander MacCulloch	1562	
	Gilbert Guthrie	1572	
	Gilbert Guthrie	1588	
	James Workmam	1597	
	James Cunningham	1625	
	Alexander Guthrie	1630	
	James Esplin	1630	
	James Tailefer	1661	
	George Porteous of Craiglockhart	1674	
	Michael Baillie	1698	
	Alexander Drummond	1704	
	James Brodie	1729	
	Robert Donaldson	1760	
	Robert Dods of Muircleugh	1764	
	George Douglas of Torquhen	1775	
	Archibald Campbell	1796	
	Thomas Small	1801	
	Alexander MacCulloch Anderson	1830	
	William Anderson	1836	
	Vacant	1874–1884	
	John Grant	1884–1885	
	Andrew Ross	1885–1901	
	Vacant	1901–1925	
	John Horne Stevenson	1925–1939	
	Lt-Col. John William Balfour Paul of Cakemuir	1939–1957	
	James Monteith Grant	1957–1969	
	Thomas Innes of Learney	1969–1971	
	Malcolm Innes of Edingight	1971–1981	
	James Monteith Grant	1981–1982	
	Maj. David Maitland-Titterton	1982–1988	
	Vacant	1988–2012	
	The Hon. Adam Bruce, WS	2012–Present	

== See also ==
- Officer of Arms
- Herald
- Court of the Lord Lyon
- Heraldry Society of Scotland
