= Ormond Pursuivant =

- The heraldic badge of Ormond Pursuivant of Arms
- Heraldic tradition: Gallo-British
- Jurisdiction: Scotland
- Governing body: Court of the Lord Lyon

Ormond Pursuivant of Arms in Ordinary (also spelt Ormonde) is a current Scottish pursuivant of arms in Ordinary of the Court of the Lord Lyon.

The office was probably instituted around the same time as the creation of James Stewart, second son of James III of Scotland, as Marquess of Ormonde in 1476. There is a mention of Ormond being sent with letters to the Earl of Angus in 1488.

The badge of office is A mullet gyronny of ten Or and Gules five fleur-de-lys Gules in the angles between the points surmounted of a coronet of four fleur de-lys (two visible) and four crosses pattée (one and two-halves visible) Or.

The office is currently vacant and was last held by John Stirling, WS. He took part in the Royal Procession at the 2023 Coronation.

== Holders of the office ==
| Arms | Name | Date of appointment | Ref |
|---|---|---|---|
| | John Scrimgeour of Glaster | 1501 | |
| | Alexander Oliphant | 1557 | |
| | Martin Udwart | 1566 | |
| | Alexander MacCulloch | 1569 | |
| | John Gledstanes of Quothquhan | 1577 | |
| | David Gardner | 1607 | |
| | James Currie | 1622 | |
| | Adam Clerk | 1636 | |
| | Patrick Murdoch | 1641 | |
| | Mungo Murray | 1661 | |
| | James Spence | 1668 | |
| | William Smith | 1701 | |
| | John Turner | 1708 | |
| | Alexander Martin | 1710 | |
| | George Dick | 1725 | |
| | Patrick Begbie | 1769 | |
| | James Lawrie | 1782 | |
| | William Allan | 1807 | |
| | Edward Livingstone | 1834 | |
| | George Goldie | 1835 | |
| | Andrew Paterson | 1840 | |
| | John Brown | 1855 | |
| | Vacant | 1879–1971 | |
| | Maj. David Maitland-Titterton | 1971–1982 | |
| | Vacant | 1982–2009 | |
| | Mark D. Dennis | 2009–2017 | |
| | Vacant | 2017–2021 | |
| | John Stirling, WS | 2021–2024 | |
| | Vacant | 2024-Present | |

== See also ==
- Officer of Arms
- Pursuivant
- Court of the Lord Lyon
- Heraldry Society of Scotland
