= New Register House =

House in Edinburgh, Scotland

Coordinates: 55.9542°N 3.1902°W

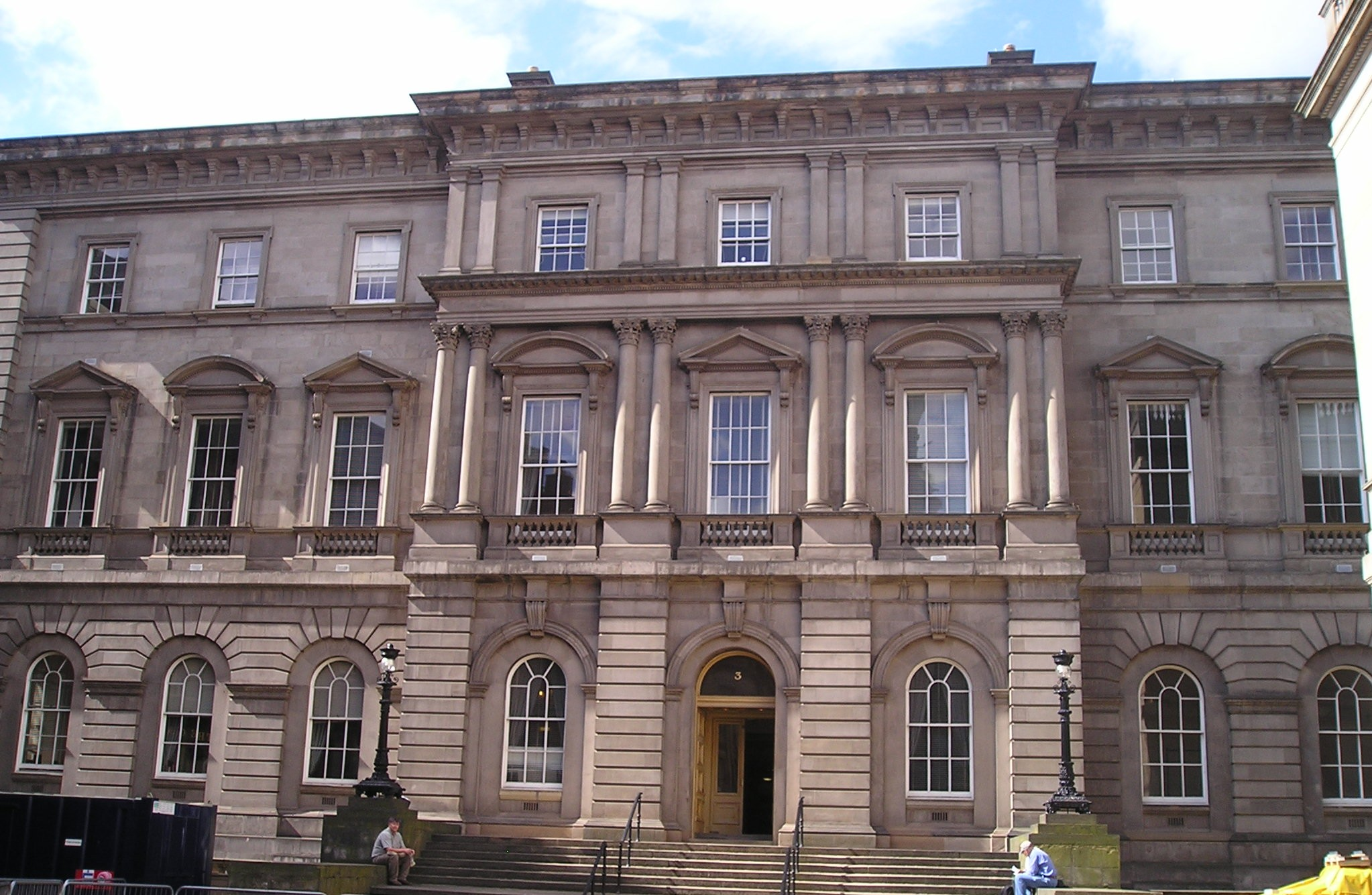
New Register House

New Register House is one of multiple buildings within the National Records of Scotland estate. It is located near St Andrew Square to the east end of Princes Street in the New Town of Edinburgh, Scotland. It also houses the Court of the Lord Lyon and housed the Office of Director of Chancery until its abolition in 1928.

== Architecture and construction ==
The building is located in West Register Street, Edinburgh behind Robert Adam's 18th century Register House (referred to now as General Register House). The Italianate structure was built by architect Robert Matheson between 1859 and 1863 and was complementary in architectural style to Adam's Neoclassical original. A portico was added to the south elevation to give it the character of a public building; and the style of internal finish was kept simple. New Register House was needed to provide additional storage capacity for Scotland's archives, particularly for the birth, death and marriage records, which were the result of compulsory registration after 1855. The building was first occupied in 1861 and completed in 1863 following the addition of 5 offices to each floor on the north side. The Accountant in Bankruptcy and Lord Lyon's departments were also allocated rooms. It cost, complete with fittings, nearly £35,000 to build.

The main feature of the building is the lofty fireproof central repository, the Dome, which consists of five tiers of ironwork shelving and galleries and is surrounded on the outside by staff and search rooms on three floors. The Dome is a large and striking circular chamber, over 27 m (90 ft) high and of interest as a piece of 19th century functional architecture and structural engineering. The 6.5 km (4.0 mi) of shelving in the Dome contain some half a million volumes. These include some 400,000 statutory registers of all the births, deaths and marriages in Scotland since 1855, still being added to every year. Red birth volumes are on the first tier, the death volumes in funereal black on the second, and the marriage volumes in green on the third. The original marriage schedules, which are signed by the parties immediately after marriage ceremonies in Scotland, are shelved on the top tier of the Dome as are the open Census records from 1841 to 1891.

== Repository ==
It is today popular among genealogists because, in addition to the Statutory Registers from 1855 onwards, it houses the Old Parish Registers, some of which date back to the 16th century, and the declassified Census records, starting in 1841. The oldest parish volume dates from 1553 and is for the parish of Errol, near Perth. The Canongate parish supplies the earliest parish register for the city of Edinburgh. It dates from 1564, before the Canongate became part of the royal burgh. Among records of ordinary citizens and burgesses it contains the proclamation of banns of marriage of Mary Queen of Scots and Lord Darnley. As well as royals, the building contains records of most famous Scots, for example Robert Burns, David Livingstone and James Watt.

== Potential closure ==
In January 2015 it was revealed that both New Register House and the neighbouring General Register House had been recommended for closure, and that staff and records would be relocated to the existing storage facility in Sighthill. In October 2021, the National Records of Scotland appointed conservation specialists to examine and produce a repair plan for the New Register House's roof. In 2019, rain leaked through the roof, damaging documents.
