= Ranald Boyle =

Ranald Hugh Montgomerie Boyle DSC (19 August 1921 – 17 September 1999) was a British diplomat.

Boyle was the son of David Boyle and Laura Tennant. He was educated at Wellington College, Berkshire and Exeter College, Oxford.

He joined the Royal Naval Volunteer Reserve in 1941 and served in the Second World War, including in the Dieppe Raid during which he was wounded. In 1944 he was awarded the Distinguished Service Cross.

Following the war, Boyle joined the Sudan Political Service in Anglo-Egyptian Sudan. He was District Commissioner of Gogrial between 1946 and 1953. He then joined Her Majesty's Overseas Civil Service and was a District Commissioner in Kenya Colony from 1956 to 1964. From 1964 to 1969 he served in Her Majesty's Diplomatic Service as political agent in Qatar, from where he went to the British embassy in Khartoum, resigning in 1970.

Boyle subsequently worked for Hambros Bank between 1970 and 1981 and for the Bank ABC between 1981 and 1983. He was admitted to the Royal Company of Archers.

He married Norma Gray on 27 April 1957; together they had seven children.
