= Islay Herald =

- The heraldic badge of Islay Herald of Arms
- Heraldic tradition: Gallo-British
- Jurisdiction: Scotland
- Governing body: Court of the Lord Lyon

Islay Herald of Arms is a Scottish herald of arms of the Court of the Lord Lyon.

The office was first mentioned in 1493. Islay is an island off the west coast of Scotland and was the headquarters of the Lord of the Isles. When the influence of that powerful noble was broken by the King of Scots during the fifteenth century, several names associated with the Lord of the Isles were absorbed and used by the crown.

The badge of office is Two salmon hauriant embowed Proper encircling a lymphad sails furled oars in action two armed men on deck sinister Sable by a flag Gules ensigned of the Crown of Scotland Proper.

The office is currently vacant and was last held by Yvonne Holton.

== Holders of the office ==
Arms	Name	Date of appointment	Ref
	Henry Thomson of Keillour	1496	
	... Hay	1531	
	Peter Thomson	1531	
	Gilbert Lindsay of Trakwan	1534	
	Peter Morrison	1552	
	James Purdie of Kinaldies	1572	
	Patrick Bannatyne	1588	
	Sir David Lindsay of the Mount (Secundus)	1591	
	John Blinsele	1596	
	Thomas Drysdale	1617	
	James Currie	1636	
	John Cullen	1661	
	John Balsillie	1667	
	William Govan	1676	
	James Still	1701	
	Alexander Martin	1725	
	Valentine White	1757	
	William Robertson	1776	
	Robert Grant	1795	
	John Cook	1811	
	William Goodall Bayley	1852	
	Henry Wilson	1864	
	Vacant	1884–1981	
	John Inglis Drever "Don" Pottinger	1981–1986	
	Vacant	1986–2008	
	Alastair Campbell of Airds	2008–2014 (in Extraordinary)	
	William David Hamilton Sellar	2014–2019 (in Extraordinary)	
	Vacant	2019–2021	
	Yvonne Holton	2021–2024	
	Vacant	2024–Present	

== See also ==
- Officer of Arms
- Herald
- Court of the Lord Lyon
- Heraldry Society of Scotland
