= Joseph Morrow (officer of arms) =

Scottish officer of arms (born 1954)

The Reverend Canon Joseph Morrow CVO CBE KC DL FRSE
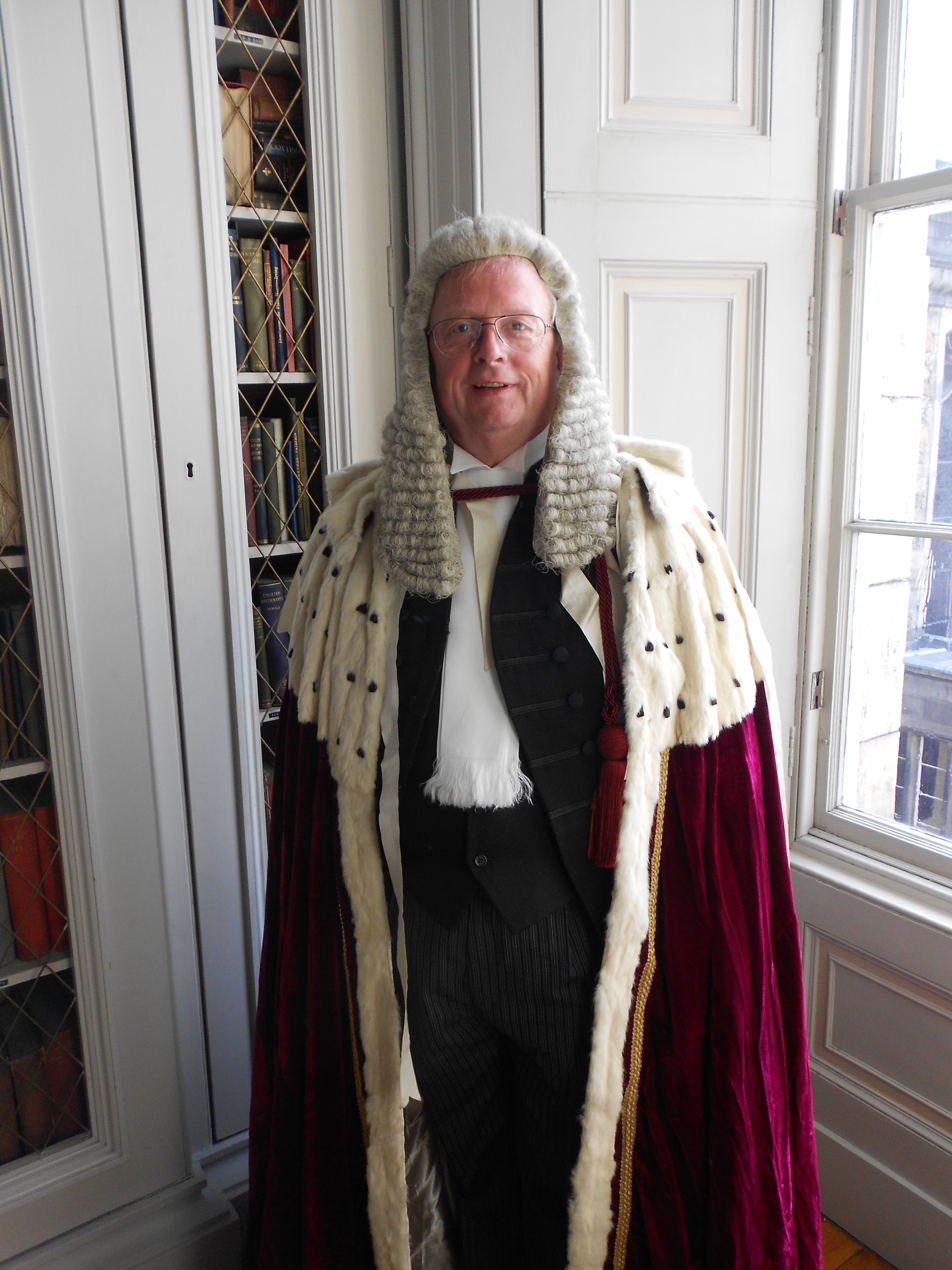
- Dr Morrow formally robed as Lord Lyon King of Arms

Lord Lyon King of Arms
- Incumbent
- Assumed office 27 February 2014
- Monarchs: Elizabeth II; Charles III
- Preceded by: David Sellar

Personal details
- Born: 12 December 1954 (age 71)

Joseph John Morrow CVO CBE KC DL FRSE (born 12 December 1954), is the current Lord Lyon King of Arms. He was appointed on 17 January 2014 and, sworn of office on 27 February before the Lord President of the Court of Session, as Lord Lyon, Morrow took part in the Coronation of Charles III and Camilla in 2023.

== Biography ==
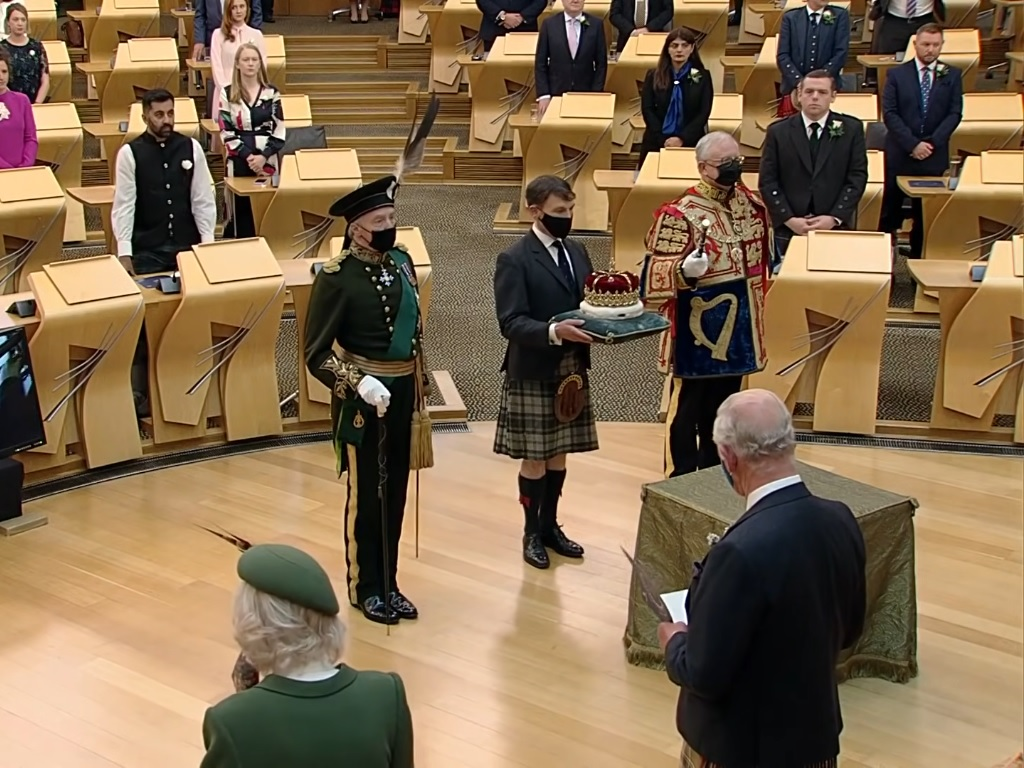
Dr Morrow in the Lord Lyon's tabard at the Scottish Parliament, 2021

A member of the Faculty of Advocates, Morrow took silk in September 2015. In 2008 he was appointed President of the Mental Health Tribunal for Scotland (demitted office October 2019). He has previously served as Her Majesty's Commissioner for the Mental Welfare Commission for Scotland (1999–2006), as a First-Tier Tribunal Judge (Immigration and Asylum Chamber) (2002–2013), and as President of the Additional Support Needs Tribunals for Scotland (2010–2014).

In 2009, Morrow was appointed as Vice Lord-Lieutenant of Dundee, having served as a Labour councillor for the Maryfield ward until that year. He held the positions of Convenor of the Economic Development Committee, Convenor of the Dundee Waterfront Development Board, and was Deputy Lord Provost during his time as an elected member.

Formerly Chaplain of Glamis Castle and Chancellor of the Diocese of Brechin, Morrow now serves as an Honorary Canon of St Paul's Cathedral, Dundee.

He was a Freemason who from 2004 to 2005 served as the 108th Grand Master Mason of the Grand Lodge of Scotland. In March 2018 he was appointed as the First Grand Principal of the Supreme Grand Royal Arch Chapter of Scotland. On 26 October 2023 he was elected to a further term as the Grand Master Mason and was installed into this role in November 2023. It was announced on 17 September 2024 that he had resigned as Grand Master Mason and was stepping back from all Masonic duties with effect from 16 September 2024, citing personal reasons as the cause.

Appointed Commander of the Order of St John (CStJ) in 2012, in December 2015 he was promoted Knight of Justice of the Order of St John (KJStJ). In 2016 he was awarded an Honorary Doctorate of Laws by Edinburgh Napier University.

In 2020, Morrow was appointed Honorary Colonel of 2 (City of Dundee and Highland) Signal Squadron, a sub-unit of 32nd Signal Regiment, a Royal Signals Army Reserve based in Dundee and Aberdeen, a position he relinquished when the tenure expired in November 2025.

Morrow's interests include ecclesiastical history, the practical application of ceremonial to state, civil, military and ecclesiastical areas of Scottish life, together with over thirty years' experience in the field of heraldry.

== Arms ==
Coat of arms of Joseph Morrow
Crest A Dexter Hand Or holding a Dagger erect Purpure hilted and pomelled Or Escutcheon Per Fess enhanced Or and Purpure over all three Piles conjoined in point counter-changed, the centre Pile charged with a Maunch and the other two with Passion Crosses Or Motto Deo Volente ("With God Willing")

== See also ==
- Masters of the Grand Lodge of Scotland

Masonic offices
Preceded by Sir Archibald Orr-Ewing, 6th Bt	Grand Master of the Grand Lodge of Scotland; 2004–2005	Succeeded by Sir Archibald Orr-Ewing, 6th Bt
Heraldic offices
Preceded by David Sellar	Lord Lyon King of Arms; 2014–present	Incumbent
