= Falkland Pursuivant =

- The heraldic badge of Falkland Pursuivant of Arms
- Heraldic tradition: Gallo-British
- Jurisdiction: Scotland
- Governing body: Court of the Lord Lyon

Falkland Pursuivant of Arms is a Scottish pursuivant of arms of the Court of the Lord Lyon.

The title was first mentioned in 1493 and it is derived from the Royal Palace of the same name located in Fife. The title is often used for a Pursuivant Extraordinary: an officer who is not part of the ordinary complement of the Court but is called to duty when needed.

The badge of office is A stag lodged reguardant Gules, gorged of a coronet of four fleur-de-lys (two visible) and four crosses pattee (one and two halves visible) Or.

The office is currently held by Major Neil Cargill and immediately prior to him was held by Colin Russell, who took part in the Royal Procession at the 2023 Coronation.

== Holders of the office ==
Arms	Name	Dates of tenure	Ref
	Alexander Guthrie	1532	
	Lt-Col. John William Balfour Paul of Cakemuir	1927–1939	
	Iain Moncreiffe	1952–1953 (in Extraordinary)	
	David Hugh Montgomerie Boyle	16–29 June 1953 (in Extraordinary)	
	David Hugh Montgomerie Boyle	27 June – 10 July 1955	
	Sir Malcolm Innes of Edingight	1957–1958 (in Extraordinary)	
	David Hugh Montgomerie Boyle	15–28 October 1962 (in Extraordinary)	
	David Hugh Montgomerie Boyle	28 June – 11 July 1963	
	Maj. Charles John Shaw of Tordarroch	10 June – 31 August 1966 (in Extraordinary)	
	Maj. David Maitland-Titterton	1969–1971 (in Extraordinary)	
	Lord James Alexander Douglas-Hamilton	7–14 July 1973 (in Extraordinary)	
	Peter de Vere Beauclerk-Dewar	1975 (in Extraordinary)	
	Brig. Francis Henderson Coutts	1977 (in Extraordinary)	
	Peter de Vere Beauclerk-Dewar	1982 (in Extraordinary)	
	Peter Drummond-Murray of Mastrick	1990 (in Extraordinary)	
	Peter de Vere Beauclerk-Dewar	1991 (in Extraordinary)	
	Maj. Christopher Roads	1996 (in Extraordinary)	
	Peter de Vere Beauclerk-Dewar	1997 (in Extraordinary)	
	George Way of Plean	2016–2017 (in Extraordinary)	
	Roderick Macpherson	2018–2021 (in Extraordinary)	
	Colin C. Russell	2021–2024 (in Extraordinary)	
	Major Neil Kilpatrick Cargill	2024–Present (in Extraordinary)	

== See also ==
- Officer of Arms
- Pursuivant
- Court of the Lord Lyon
- Heraldry Society of Scotland
