= Robin Blair =

Lord Lyon King of Arms

The heraldic achievement of the Office of the Lord Lyon King of Arms.

Robin Orr Blair, CVO, WS (born 1 January 1940), former Lord Lyon King of Arms of Scotland, is a retired solicitor, and was a partner with Dundas & Wilson CS and later with Turcan Connell. From 1988 until his appointment as Lord Lyon, he held the post of Purse Bearer to the Lord High Commissioner to the General Assembly of the Church of Scotland. He is a member of the Royal Company of Archers.

He was appointed Lord Lyon by Queen Elizabeth II on 9 February 2001 following a recommendation from Scotland's First Minister Henry McLeish. The role had been publicly advertised beforehand, for the first time in 700 years, and the selection process was overseen, also for the first time, by the Scottish Executive.

On 19 February 2007, he became the Honorary President of the Scottish Genealogy Society upon the retirement after many years of Sir Malcolm Innes of Edingight, who had preceded him as Lord Lyon.

In August 2007, Blair intimated his resignation as Lord Lyon. In 2008 his successor, David Sellar, was appointed.

Already a Lieutenant of the Royal Victorian Order (LVO), he was appointed Commander of the Royal Victorian Order (CVO) in the 2008 Birthday Honours.

== Arms ==
Coat of arms of Robin Blair
Escutcheon Argent on a saltire between in the flanks two maunches, the sinister contournee, Sable five mascles Or.

== See also ==
- Heraldry
- Officer of Arms
- The Court of the Lord Lyon King of Arms

Heraldic offices
Preceded by Sir Malcolm Innes of Edingight	Lord Lyon King of Arms; 2001–2008	Succeeded by David Sellar
