= Carrick Pursuivant =

Scottish title

- The heraldic badge of Carrick Pursuivant of Arms
- Heraldic tradition: Scottish
- Jurisdiction: Scotland
- Governing body: Court of the Lord Lyon

Carrick Pursuivant of Arms is a Scottish pursuivant of arms of the Court of the Lord Lyon.

The title is derived from the Earldom of Carrick, one of the titles borne by Robert the Bruce before his succession to the crown. The arms of the Earldom are Argent, a chevron Gules, hence the chevron in the pursuivant's badge. The earliest known reference to the office is from 1364.

The badge is blazoned: A chevron Gules enfiled of a coronet of four fleurs-de-lys (two visible) and four crosses pattee (one and two halves visible) Or.

The current Carrick Pursuivant is Professor Gillian Black. She took part in the Royal Procession at the 2023 Coronation in her previous role of Linlithgow Pursuivant alongside her predecessor as Carrick Pursuivant George Way of Plean.

== Holders of the office ==
Arms	Name	Date of appointment	Ref
	John Trupour	1364	
	... (was Rothesay Herald)	1478	
	James Anderson	1526	
	James Wallace	1531	
	John Paterson	1538	
	Alexander Forrester	1557	
	Robert Campbell	1582	
	James Cunningham	1617	
	Alexander Neilson	1622	
	John Spence of Brunstane	1633	
	Gideon Weir	1633	
	John Sawers	1637	
	Thomas Allan	1661	
	Willian Glover	1672	
	Robert Glover	1672	
	John Young	1678	
	Patrick Wilson	1679	
	Harry Armstrong	1699	
	Robert Brown	1706	
	George Brodie	1747	
	William Douglas	1753	
	Malcolm Grant	1771	
	John Grieve	1790	
	John Young	1818	
	James Gillon	1827	
	William Anderson	1833	
	William Dunnett	1836	
	Henry Wilson	1855	
	Archibald Thornburn	1864	
	Vacant	1872–1879	
	Sir James William Mitchell, Baronet	1879	
	John Spence	1879–1883	
	John Grant	1883–1884	
	William Macfarlane Wylie	1884–1886	
	Sir Francis James Grant	1886–1898	
	William Rae Macdonald	1898–1907	
	Sir Duncan Alexander Dundas Campbell, Baronet	1907-1926	
	Sir Thomas Innes of Learney	1926-1935	
	Sir Alexander Hay Seton, Baronet	1935–1939	
	Alexander James Stevenson	1939–1946	
	Sir James Monteith Grant	1946–1957	
	Sir Malcolm Innes of Edingight	1958–1971	
	David John Wilson Reid of Robertland	1972–1974	
	John Alexander Spens	1974–1985	
	Vacant	1985–1992	
	Elizabeth Ann Roads	1992–2010	
	Vacant	2010–2017	
	George Way of Plean	2017–2024	
	Prof. Gillian Black	2024–Present	

== See also ==
- Officer of Arms
- Pursuivant
- Court of the Lord Lyon
- Heraldry Society of Scotland
