= Alastair Lorne Campbell of Airds =

Scottish officer of arms and author (1937–2022)

Alastair Lorne Campbell of Airds (1937–2022) was a former Scottish officer of arms and author. Campbell of Airds was appointed Unicorn Pursuivant of Arms in Ordinary in 1987. In 2008, he was appointed Islay Herald Extraordinary. As an active member of the Highland Society of London, Airds published a short history of the society in 1978. He has also written several books on the history of Clan Campbell.

He was the son of Lorne MacLaine Campbell of Airds.
