= Court of the Lord Lyon =

Court which regulates heraldry in Scotland

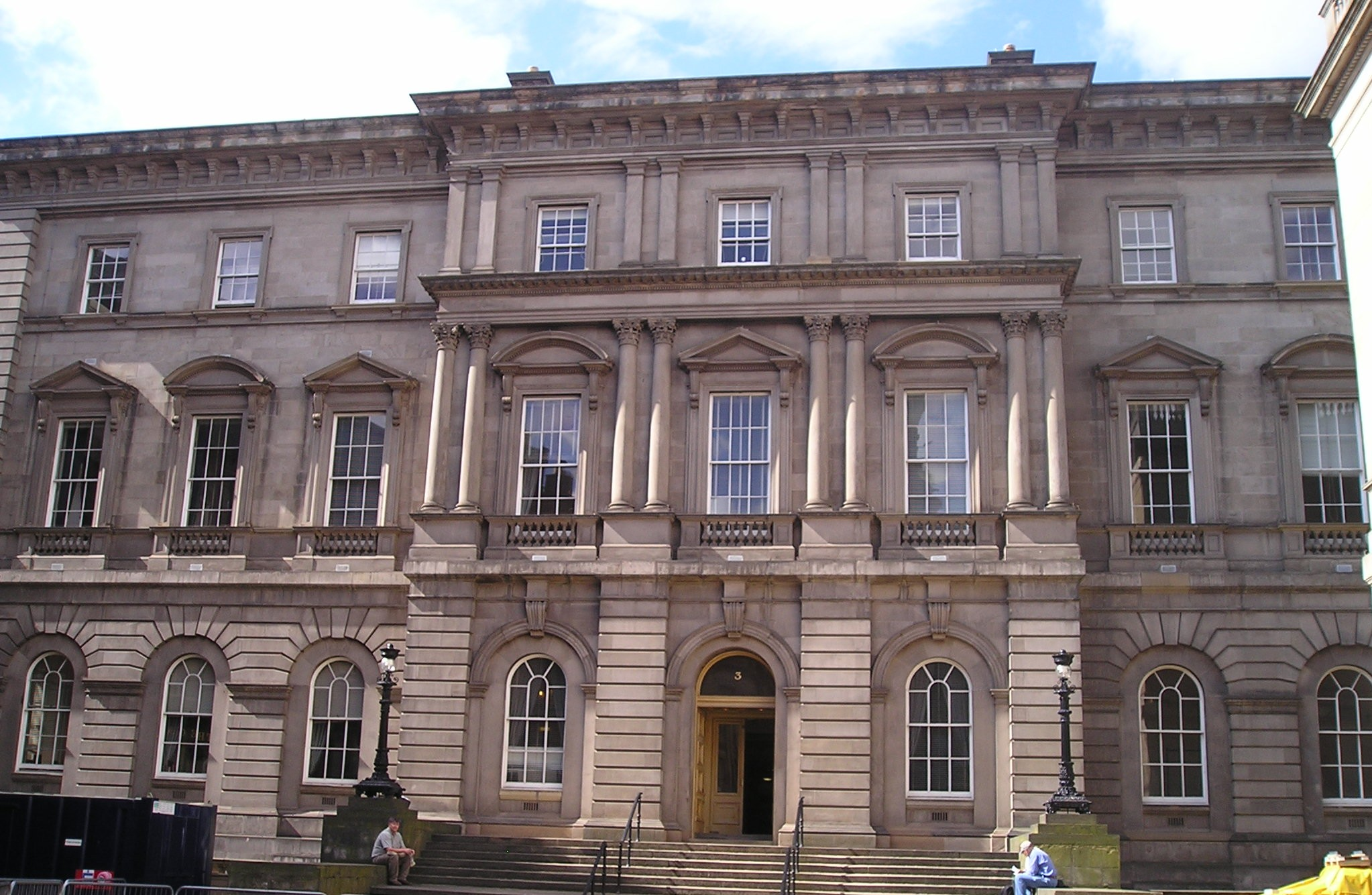
- The arms of office of the Lord Lyon King of Arms New Register House, Edinburgh
- Interactive map of Court of the Lord Lyon
- 55.954°N 3.190°W
- Established: 1532; 494 years ago
- Jurisdiction: Scotland
- Location: New Register House; 3 West Register Street; Edinburgh; EH1 3YT
- Coordinates: 55.954°N 3.190°W
- Composition method: Appointed by the Monarch
- Authorised by: Lyon King of Arms Act 1592 and subsequent statutes
- Appeals to: Civil: Inner House of the Court of Session; Criminal: High Court of Justiciary
- Website: www.courtofthelordlyon.scot

Lord Lyon King of Arms
- Currently: Joseph Morrow CVO CBE KStJ KC
- Since: 17 January 2014

The Court of the Lord Lyon, or Lyon Court, is a standing court of law, based in New Register House in Edinburgh, which regulates heraldry in Scotland. The Lyon Court maintains the register of grants of arms, known as the Public Register of All Arms and Bearings in Scotland, as well as records of genealogies.

The Lyon Court is a public body, and the fees for grants of arms are paid to His Majesty's Treasury. It is headed by the Right Honourable the Lord Lyon King of Arms, who must be legally qualified, as he has criminal jurisdiction in heraldic matters, and the court is fully integrated into the Scottish legal system, including having a dedicated prosecutor, known in Scotland as a procurator fiscal.

Its equivalent in England, Wales, and Northern Ireland, in terms of awarding arms, is the College of Arms, which is a royal corporation and not a court of law. The High Court of Chivalry is a civil court in England and Wales with jurisdiction over cases dealing with heraldry.

== Remit and jurisdiction ==
=== Rights to arms and pedigree ===
The Lyon Court is directly responsible for the establishment of the rights to arms and pedigree. These can include the granting and regranting of armorial bearings by letters patent and various Birthbrieves, such as Diplomas of Nobility or of the Chiefship (Diploma Stemmatis). All of these actions must begin with a formal petition to the court.

When sufficient evidence of these rights is attested, a judicial interlocutor or warrant will be issued by the Lord Lyon. This power of the Lord Lyon is derived from the monarch's royal prerogatives, which have been delegated to the office by law. The warrant will then authorise the Lyon Clerk and Keeper of the Records to prepare Letters Patent of the particular coat of arms or genealogy to be recorded in the Public Register of All Arms and Bearings in Scotland or in the Public Register of All Genealogies and Birthbrieves in Scotland. The fees for all of these procedures are payable to the Exchequer. This is in contrast to the College of Arms in London, which, being an independent corporate body rather than a government department, reinvests all fees into itself.

=== Jurisdiction ===
The court does not have universal jurisdiction and usually cannot accept applications (petitions) from abroad. According to the court's official publication on its website, "the governing factor in the case of an original Grant of Arms is the domicile of the petitioner or the ownership of property in Scotland." In the second case, when the petitioner is not able to reside on the land, e.g. forestry land, the land is usually not able to bring the owner into the Lord Lyon's jurisdiction. One major exception from this principle applies to Commonwealth citizens if their local jurisdiction does not have its own heraldic office. "Commonwealth citizens, in particular those of Scottish descent – save for Canada and South Africa which have their own heraldic authorities – can apply to the Lord Lyon King of Arms."

=== Protection of arms ===
The penal aspect of the court is concerned with the protection of the rights, both of private individuals and of the Crown (represented by the Scottish Government) in Scottish armorial bearings. The Lord Lyon also has control over messengers-at-arms, judicial officers responsible for serving documents and enforcing legal orders throughout Scotland.

The protection of the rights to arms is of signal importance because an individuals and corporations have paid fees to the Crown in return for exclusive rights to use those armorial bearings. A coat of arms can only belong to one particular person at a time. Without such protection, a coat of arms would be useless as a form of identification and worthless as a piece of private property. Furthermore, a misappropriation or unauthorised use (displaying or usurping) of a man's coat of arms is still considered a 'real injury' under Scottish common law.

Accordingly, an owner of a Scottish coat of arms may obtain a judicial order in the court against anybody using his arms. The Crown and the public have an interest in these cases: the Crown has such an interest because, in Scotland, all fees on the registration of armorial bearings and pedigrees are payable to HM Treasury; the public has an interest in terms of the prevention of fraud and of the misappropriation of property. Individual coats of arms are also considered legal evidence, which means that they could be used in legal cases concerning the establishment of succession or identity.

=== Punishment ===
Seal of the Lord Lyon King of Arms that is used to seal on all grants of arms.

The Lyon Court, like all Scottish courts, has a public prosecutor; styled 'Procurator Fiscal to Lyon Court', and independently appointed by the Scottish Ministers. This fiscal raises proceedings, when necessary, against those who improperly usurp armorial bearings. The punishment for this offence is set out in several Scottish statutes. The court has the power to fine the offender and to ensure items bearing the offending Arms are removed, destroyed or forfeited. In lieu of the financial interests of the Treasury, the High Court of Justiciary will therefore sometimes regard cases brought by the Procurator Fiscal similarly to those of the Inland Revenue. Accordingly, an armorial offender was viewed as sternly as any other evading national taxation. This is in contrast to the Court of Chivalry in England, which has similar powers to the Lyon Court, but is a civil court, and has met only once in the last 230 years, in 1954, and is unlikely to sit again unless for a substantial cause.

Historically the punishment for the usurpation of arms were severe. In the Lyon King of Arms Act 1592 and the Lyon King of Arms Act 1672, the court was given the full power to fine and imprison offenders. In the Lyon King of Arms Act 1669 the court was given the power to issue letters of horning; as well as the full power to erase unwarranted arms, to "dash them furth" of stained-glass windows and to break unwarranted seals. Where the cases involve forfeiture, the Court could grant a warrant for the seizure of movable goods and gear where unwarranted arms are found.

== Judges and office holders ==
=== Officers of the Lyon Court ===
The only judge of the Lyon Court is the Lord Lyon King of Arms. The Lord Lyon is part of the judiciary of Scotland but is not subject to the discipline of the Lord President of the Court of Session. The Lord President's powers of discipline are outlined in the Judiciary and Courts (Scotland) Act 2008 and the Courts Reform (Scotland) Act 2014; the Lord Lyon is included in neither act. The administration of the court is also separate from the Scottish Courts and Tribunals Service.

The other officers of the Lyon Court are the Lyon Clerk and Keeper of the Records, whose appointments are made by royal sign-manual, and the Procurator Fiscal who is independently appointed by the Scottish Ministers. Both officers are registered in The Edinburgh Gazette. There is also a Macer to the Lord Lyon who is a senior Messenger-at-Arms. The Macer appears when the court is sitting in public and when proclamations are made by the Lord Lyon.

==== Lord Lyon ====
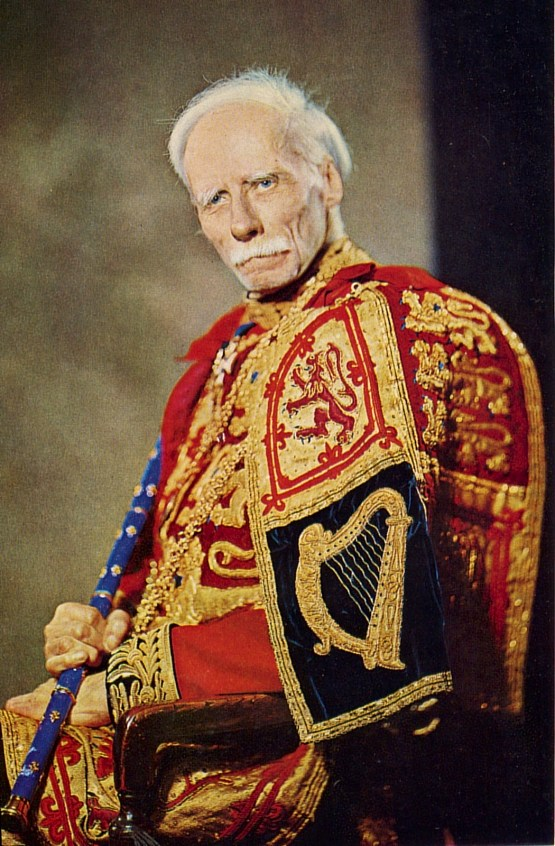
Sir Thomas Innes of Learney in his tabard of the Royal Arms, He held the office of the Lord Lyon from 1945 to 1969.

The Lord Lyon King of Arms is the chief heraldic officer of Scotland and a Great Officer of State and a judge in the judiciary of Scotland. The Lord Lyon's judicial duties concerning Scottish heraldic business and heraldic laws are conducted through the machinery of the Court of the Lord Lyon. The court exercises both civil and penal jurisdiction under the old common law of Scotland and many acts of Parliament.

The Lord Lyon has administrative functions, and is responsible for granting commissions to messengers-at-arms. The power to appoint the Lord Lyon is vested in the monarch of the United Kingdom by section 3 of the Lyon King of Arms Act 1867.

==== Lyon Clerk and Keeper of Records ====
The Lyon Clerk is responsible for the administration of the Lyon Court. With every submission of application for a grant of arms, a matriculation of arms or the recording of genealogy must be made through the Lyon Clerk. This submission must be done either personally, by an intermediary agent or by correspondence. The Lyon Clerk is required to personally interview and reply to each applicant. As such, the Lyon Clerk must take receipt of all documents and evidence submitted by the applicant in each case. Finally, after the grant or matriculation has been made, the Lyon Clerk must ensure that the resulting patent of arms is properly illuminated and emblazoned for the applicant and for the Lyon Court's register.

As Keeper of the Records, the Lyon Clerk is responsible for the maintenance of the Public Register of All Arms and Bearings in Scotland. This is done through the regular addition of new grants and matriculations. The Lyon Clerk must ensure that members of the public have access to the register by facilitating searches and studies of the records.

The Lyon Clerk's salary is paid by the Crown. This has been the case since the Lyon King of Arms Act 1867.

==== Procurator Fiscal ====
The Procurator Fiscal to the Court of the Lord Lyon is responsible for investigating complaints about usurpation of coats of arms (someone using arms to which they are not entitled) or the use of unregistered homemade coats of arms. The Procurator Fiscal can issue a letter or a warning, and where needed initiate a prosecution before the Lyon Court. The Procurator Fiscal undertakes these prosecutions on behalf of the Lord Advocate.

The Procurator Fiscal is legally qualified, either as an advocate or as a solicitor, and is appointed by the Scottish Ministers. Until 2001 the Procurator Fiscal was appointed by the Lord Lyon, but in order to ensure compliance with Article 6 of the European Convention on Human Rights, the power to appoint the Procurator Fiscal was transferred to the Scottish Ministers by the Convention Rights (Compliance) Scotland Act 2001.

==== Hereditary Lord Assessors ====
The Earl of Erroll, and Duke of Hamilton serve as hereditary assessors at the court of the Lord Lyon.

=== Current officers ===
The composition of the Lyon Court as of September 2021 is:

Court of the Lord Lyon
Insignia	Office	Arms	Name (Date of appointment)
	Lord Lyon King of Arms		Joseph Morrow, CVO, CBE, KStJ, KC, DL (17 January 2014)
	Lyon Clerk and Keeper of the Records		Russell Hunter Esq. (25 June 2018)
	Procurator Fiscal to the Court of the Lord Lyon		Alexander M. S. Green Esq., M.Theol (Hons), LL.B, LL.M, M.Litt. FSA Scot (3 August 2010)
Other officials
	Herald Painter to the Court of the Lord Lyon		Ms. Clare McCrory (1 September 2021)
	Lyon Macer		David Walker Esq. (1 May 2018)
	Office Manager		Ms Jacqueline Higginson
	Ceremonial & Development Officer		Mrs Julie Smith
	Honorary Vexillologist to the Court of the Lord Lyon		Philip Tibbetts Esq. (also March Pursuivant Extraordinary) (1 August 2018)
	Honorary Photographer		Edward Mallinson Esq.

== Officers of Arms ==
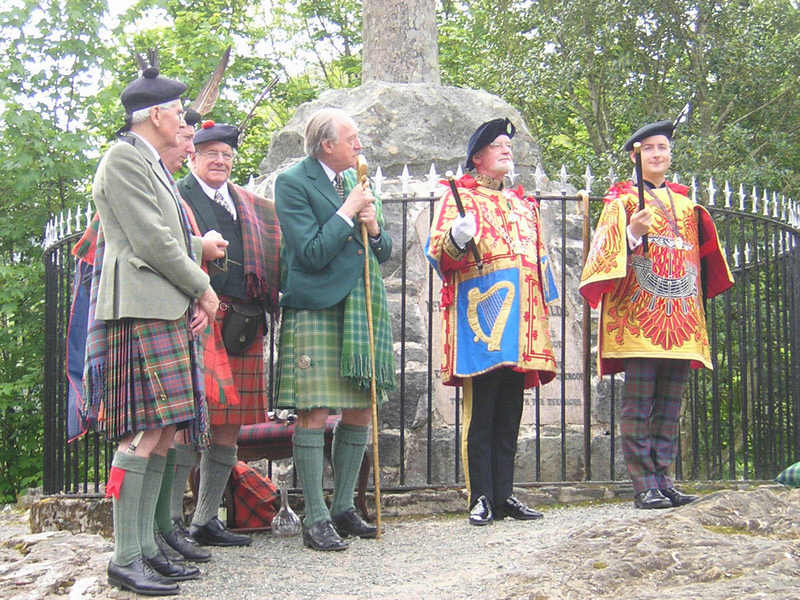
Charles Burnett, Ross Herald at the installation ceremony of the Honourable Adam Bruce as Finlaggan Pursuivant of Arms, a private herald, to Clan MacDonald in 2006.

HM Officers of Arms come under the control of the Lord Lyon and are members of the Royal Household in Scotland, however they are not officers of the Court of the Lord Lyon. They carry out many ceremonial duties in Scotland, such as on state and royal occasions and those in connection with Scottish public life. They may act as professional consultants in the realms of heraldry and genealogy, like an advocate or a law agent for members of the public and could appear for their clients before the Lyon Court as well as in the English Court of Chivalry.

Formerly there were: six Heralds of Arms and six Pursuivant of Arms in Ordinary (full-time members) and at various times any number of Extraordinary officers. The Lyon King of Arms Act 1867 reduced the number of Ordinary officers to just three of each rank. The act also set out their salaries and reaffirmed their rights and duties. These officers of arms wear the tabard of the Royal Arms of the United Kingdom, with the Scottish quarter taking precedence. They frequently appear in this uniform, when accompanying the monarch in royal ceremonies whilst he is in Scotland.

Other ceremonies in which the HM Officers of Arms take part include:

- the announcement of the dissolution of Parliament from the Mercat Cross on the Royal Mile in Edinburgh
- the inauguration of the governors of Edinburgh Castle
- the ceremonial opening of the annual meeting of the General Assembly of the Church of Scotland.

Currently there are three Heralds of Arms in Ordinary and three Pursuivants of Arms in Ordinary.

From time to time, other officers can be appointed temporarily or in recognition of their work. These are styled Heralds or Pursuivants Extraordinary. Currently there are two Heralds of Arms Extraordinary and three Pursuivants of Arms Extraordinary.

In Scotland there are also four private pursuivants who are independent of Lyon Court. These officers are employed by Scottish nobles and chiefs and perform duties relating to genealogical, heraldic, and ceremonial matters of clan members.

His Majesty's Officers of Arms as of September 2022 are:

Heralds of Arms in Ordinary
Insignia	Office	Arms	Name (Date of appointment)
	Marchmont Herald of Arms		The Hon. Adam Bruce, WS (2 April 2012)
	Rothesay Herald of Arms		George Way of Plean (1 August 2024)
	Ross Herald of Arms		John Stirling, WS (1 August 2024)
Pursuivants of Arms in Ordinary
	Unicorn Pursuivant of Arms		Roderick Alexander Macpherson, Esq. (1 September 2021)
	Carrick Pursuivant of Arms		Prof. Gillian Black (1 August 2024)
	Bute Pursuivant of Arms		Colin C. Russell (1 August 2024)
Heralds of Arms Extraordinary
	Angus Herald of Arms Extraordinary		Robin O. Blair, Esq., CVO, WS (17 March 2008)
	Albany Herald of Arms Extraordinary		Sir Crispin Agnew of Lochnaw, Bt., LVO, KC (1 September 2021)
Pursuivants of Arms Extraordinary
	March Pursuivant of Arms Extraordinary		Philip Tibbetts Esq. (also Honorary Vexillologist) (1 September 2021)
	Falkland Pursuivant of Arms Extraordinary		Lieutenant Colonel Neil Kilpatrick Cargill MVO (1 August 2024)
	Kintyre Pursuivant of Arms Extraordinary		Susan Flintoff VR (1 October 2025)

=== Vacant offices ===
Heralds of Arms
Insignia	Office	Notes
	Islay Herald of Arms
	Orkney Herald of Arms
	Snawdoun Herald of Arms
Pursuivants of Arms
	Ormond Pursuivant of Arms
	Dingwall Pursuivant of Arms
	Linlithgow Pursuivant of Arms Extraordinary

=== Private Pursuivants ===
Private Pursuivants of Arms
Arms of Chief	Office	Names
	Slains Pursuivant of Arms of Clan Hay	Reginald John Malden (2016)
	Garioch Pursuivant of Arms of the Earl of Mar	Lt-Cmdr Laurence of Mar, MA, FSA Scot, ATCL, RN (2013)
	Endure Pursuivant of Arms of Clan Lindsay	The Hon. Alexander Walter Lindsay (2006)
	Finlaggan Pursuivant of Arms of Clan Donald	Thomas Miers (2009)

== See also ==
- Bureau of Heraldry (South Africa)
- Canadian Heraldic Authority
- College of Arms (London)
- Council of Heraldry and Vexillology (Belgium)
- Flemish Heraldic Council
- Office of the Chief Herald of Ireland

== Bibliography ==
- Burnett, Charles J.; Dennis, Mark D. (1997). Scotland's Heraldic Heritage: The Lion Rejoicing. South Gyle Crescent, Edinburgh: The Stationery Office. ISBN 978-0-11-495784-1.
- Innes of Learney, Thomas; Innes of Edingight, Malcolm (1978). Scots Heraldry. London: Cassell Ltd. pp. 6–9. ISBN 0-7179-4224-7.
- Stevenson, John Horne (1914). Heraldry in Scotland. Glasgow: J. Maclehose and sons. OCLC 646916108. OL 24871294M.

== Statutory Acts ==
- Lyon King of Arms Act 1592
- Lyon King of Arms Act 1669
- Lyon King of Arms Act 1672
- Lyon King of Arms Act 1867
