= Heraldry Society of Scotland =

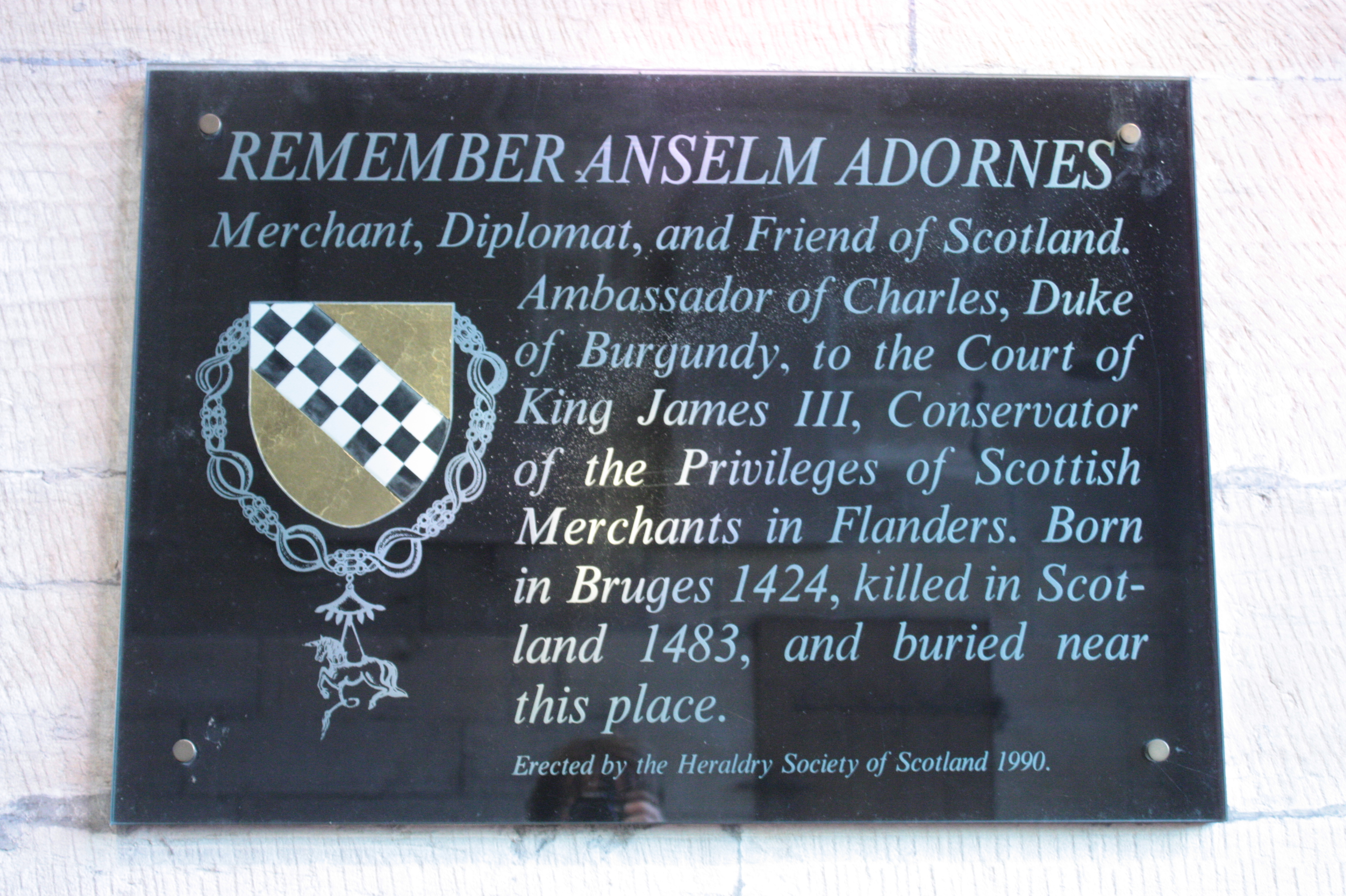
A plaque affixed by the Heraldry Society of Scotland.

The Heraldry Society of Scotland was founded in 1977 with the aim of improving the study of heraldry.

The Society's arms feature a Saint Andrew's Cross with silver thistles and a red shield. Their crest is a herald wearing a tabard of the arms, and their motto is Tak Tent of Armes, Scots for "take notice of arms".

== History ==
The society was founded in 1977 and was a notable part of a scholastic revival of heraldry that occurred in Scotland in the 1970s. In 1986 the society's St Andrew Lecture was presented by John Brooke-Little, in his capacity of Norroy and Ulster King of Arms, the first official visit to Scotland by an English herald since 1639.

In 2001 it registered with the Office of the Scottish Charity Regulator.

In 2003 the society commissioned a crown for the Lord Lyon King of Arms at the cost of around £10,000, to replace the crown that was last seen in the 17th century. The next year the society assisted United States Secretary of State Colin Powell when he sought to register a coat of arms to mark his Scottish ancestry.

The Society also participated, in conjunction with the Scottish Genealogy Society, in the planning of the XXVIIth International Congress of Genealogical and Heraldic Sciences which was convened in St Andrews in August 2006.

In 2008, the chairman of the society commented on the coat of arms used by Donald Trump, noting that it broke several conventions.

== Office holders ==
As of 2021, the Society's President is Dr. Joseph J. Morrow, Lord Lyon King of Arms and the Chairman Edward J.H. Mallinson. The Heraldic painter Romilly Squire of Rubislaw was chairman for two terms 2002–2008.

The Heraldry Society publishes a journal entitled The Double Tressure (ISSN 0141-237X). It also produces a newsletter entitled Tak Tent. There is a large quantity of information on the society's website.

== See also ==
- American Heraldry Society
- Committee on Heraldry of the New England Historic Genealogical Society
- The Heraldry Society
- Royal Heraldry Society of Canada
