= Yeomen of the Guard =

The King's Body Guard of the Yeomen of the Guard
- Badge of the Yeomen of the Guard
- Active: 1485–present
- Country: United Kingdom
- Type: Dismounted bodyguard
- Role: Royal Body Guard
- Size: One company sized formation
- Part of: Sovereign's Bodyguard
- Garrison/HQ: St James's Palace, London
- Motto: Dieu et mon droit
- March: Men of Harlech
- Engagements: Boulogne, Boyne, Dettingen

Commanders
- Colonel in Chief: Charles III
- Captain: Margaret Wheeler, Baroness Wheeler; Government Deputy Chief Whip in the House of Lords

Insignia
- Collar Badge: Rose, Thistle and Shamrock

The King's Body Guard of the Yeomen of the Guard is a bodyguard of the British monarch. The oldest British military corps still in existence, it was created by King Henry VII in 1485 after the Battle of Bosworth Field. The Yeomen of the Guard are popularly known as Beefeaters, a nickname they share with the Yeomen Warders of the Tower of London.

== History ==
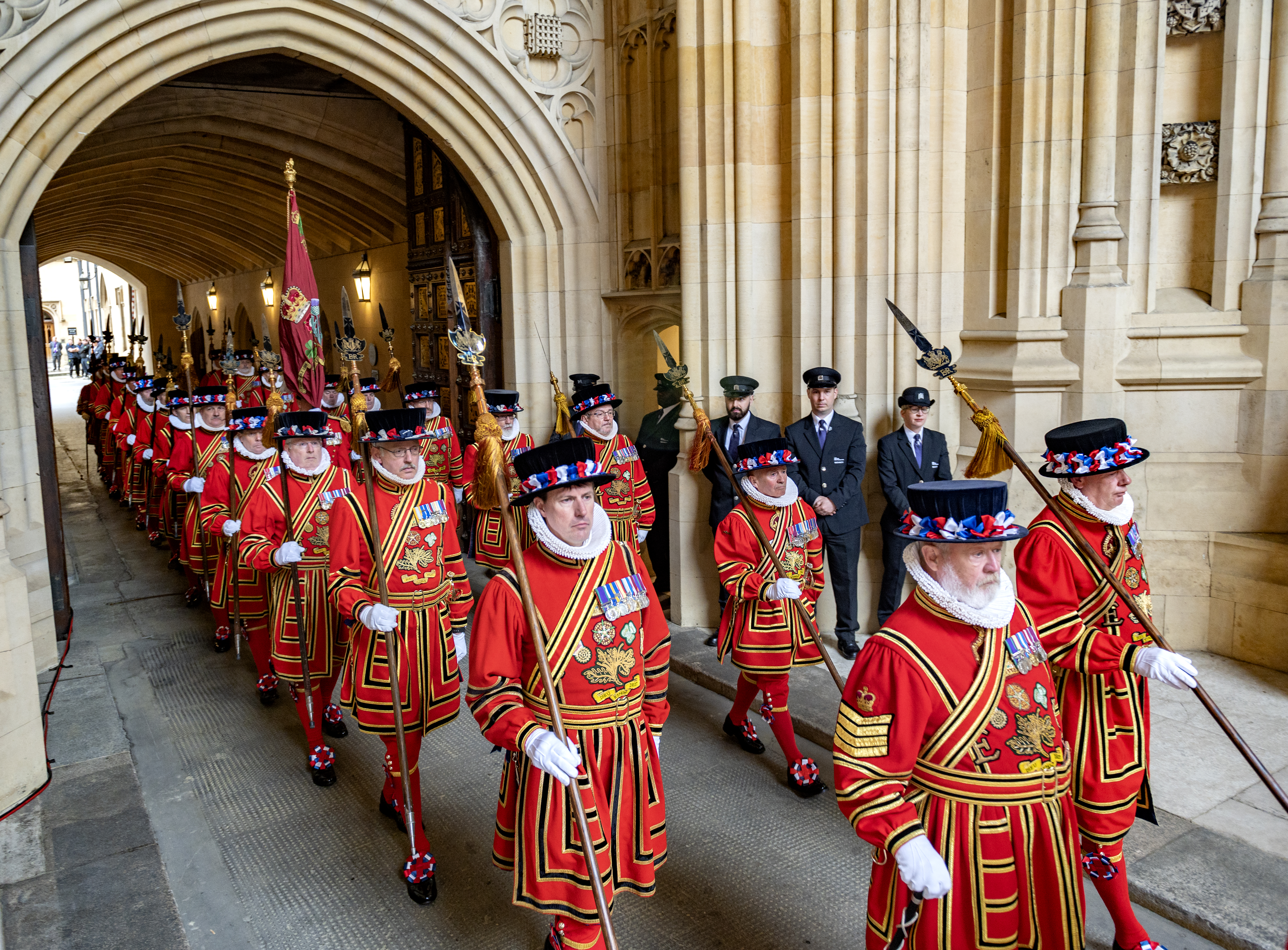
The Queen's bodyguard at the State Opening of Parliament (2022).

The kings of England always had bodyguards surrounding them. The Anglo-Saxon kings had their house guards, and the Danish kings their housecarls. By the 13th century, the Anglo-Norman kings had three groups specifically ordered to protect them: (1) the royal household sergeants-at-arms; (2) the king's foot archers (also known as the Yeomen of the Crown); and (3) the esquires of the royal household. The actual number of archers varied over the course of the 14th-15th centuries. In 1318, a Household Ordinance (the King's Proclamation containing the yearly budget for his royal household) specified that the number of archers should be 24. Edward III had between 16 and 22 yeomen, Richard II recruited an additional 300 archers from Cheshire, Edward IV had 24 yeomen, and Richard III had 138 yeomen.

=== Sources ===
Reconstructing the history of the Guard is difficult. An 1809 fire in St James's Palace, the headquarters of the Guard, destroyed whatever records may have remained from the 15th-18th centuries. The earliest mentions of the Guard are in histories from the 16th century: (a) Robert Fabian's The New Chronicles of England and France (1516); (b) Polydore Vergil's Angelica Historia (1534); and (c) Edward Hall's Chronicle (1547). Francis Bacon mentioned them in his History of the Reign of King Henry the Seventh (1622). A short history of the Guard was written by Samuel Pegge as part of his Curialia (1782).

A 50-page history of the Guard appeared in 1852, with Thomas Smith's Some Account of the Royal Body-Guard entitled the ancient corps of the Yeomen of the Guard, instituted 1485. With a brief notice of the Warders of the Tower. Smith acknowledged he used Pegge's Curialia and records of the Guard as his sources. This was followed in 1904 with Sir Reginald Hennell's 350-page The History of the King's Body Guard of the Yeomen of the Guard. Hennell was a lieutenant in the Guard at the time, who discovered that there were no records save for one old order book and miscellaneous papers. Extensive modern research has been done by Anita Hewerdine for her 1998 doctoral thesis The Yeomen of the King’s Guard 1485-1547. Results of her subsequent research are found in her 2012 book The Yeomen of the Guard and the Early Tudors: The Formation of a Royal Bodyguard (See Further Reading). Hewerdine's thesis is referenced in this article for the Tudor period, whilst Hennell's book is referenced for the 17th-19th centuries.

=== Battle of Bosworth Field ===
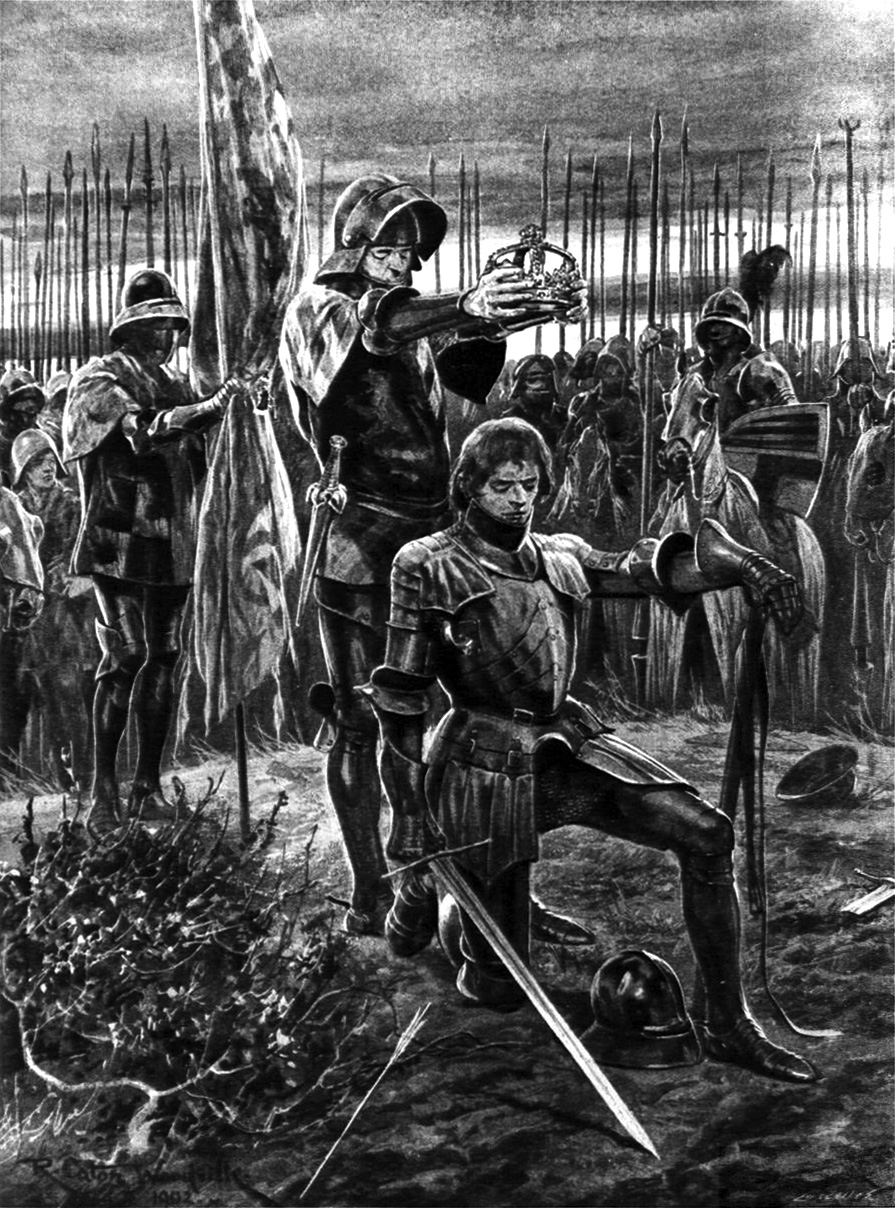
1902 depiction of Henry Tudor on Crown Hill, surrounded by his Yeomen. Note the hawthorn bush in which Richard III's crown was reportedly found.

On 22 August 1485, near the small village of Stoke Golding, Henry Tudor met King Richard III in battle for the Crown of England. The War of the Roses had persisted intermittently for more than 30 years between the rival claimants of the House of York (symbolised by a white rose) and the House of Lancaster (symbolised by a red rose). In 1483, Richard, of the House of York, had deposed his young nephew, 12-year-old Edward V. Henry Tudor, of the House of Lancaster, was the favoured candidate to replace Richard.

Three armies met that day on Bosworth Field: Richard, with his supporters, John Howard, 1st Duke of Norfolk and Henry Percy, 4th Earl of Northumberland; Henry, with his troops under command of the veteran John de Vere, 13th Earl of Oxford; and the troops of Thomas, Lord Stanley. Stanley was a powerful lord in northwest England. But he was stepfather of Henry Tudor, and Richard was holding his son hostage. Stanley's forces remained uncommitted as the battle raged. As Oxford advanced, the troops appeared to leave Henry, his bodyguards, and some French mercenaries isolated, or so it appeared to Richard. Sensing an opportunity, Richard charged toward Henry. Seeing this, Stanley made his decision, and charged to reinforce Henry. Henry's bodyguards fought bravely to hold off Richard's bodyguards until the arrival of Stanley's troops. During the melee, Richard's horse became mired in the marsh, and he was killed. Henry had won.

=== Original unit formation ===
Henry rewarded his bodyguards by formally establishing the Yeomen of the Guard of (the body of) our Lord the King. This royal act recognized their bravery and loyalty in doing their duty, and designated them as the first members of a bodyguard to protect the King (or Queen) of England forever. In their first official act on 1 October 1485, fifty members of the Yeoman of the Guard, led by John de Vere, 13th Earl of Oxford, formally escorted Henry Tudor to his coronation ceremony. This appearance of the Guard at Henry VII's coronation was first documented by Francis Bacon in 1622. The coronation appears to have been hastily arranged, using the regulations for Richard III's coronation as a draft. The Guard is not mentioned in the regulations.

There are no surviving original documents ordering the establishment of the Guard. There is only a draft document from ca 1536-37 proposing the formation of what would become the Gentlemen at Arms. The proposal contains this statement for a precedent:

the most noble and memory worthy king Henry VII for the better furnishment of his house first established and ordained the yeomen of his guard in their livery coats to wait upon his grace in his chamber, to the great setting forth and honour of his house.

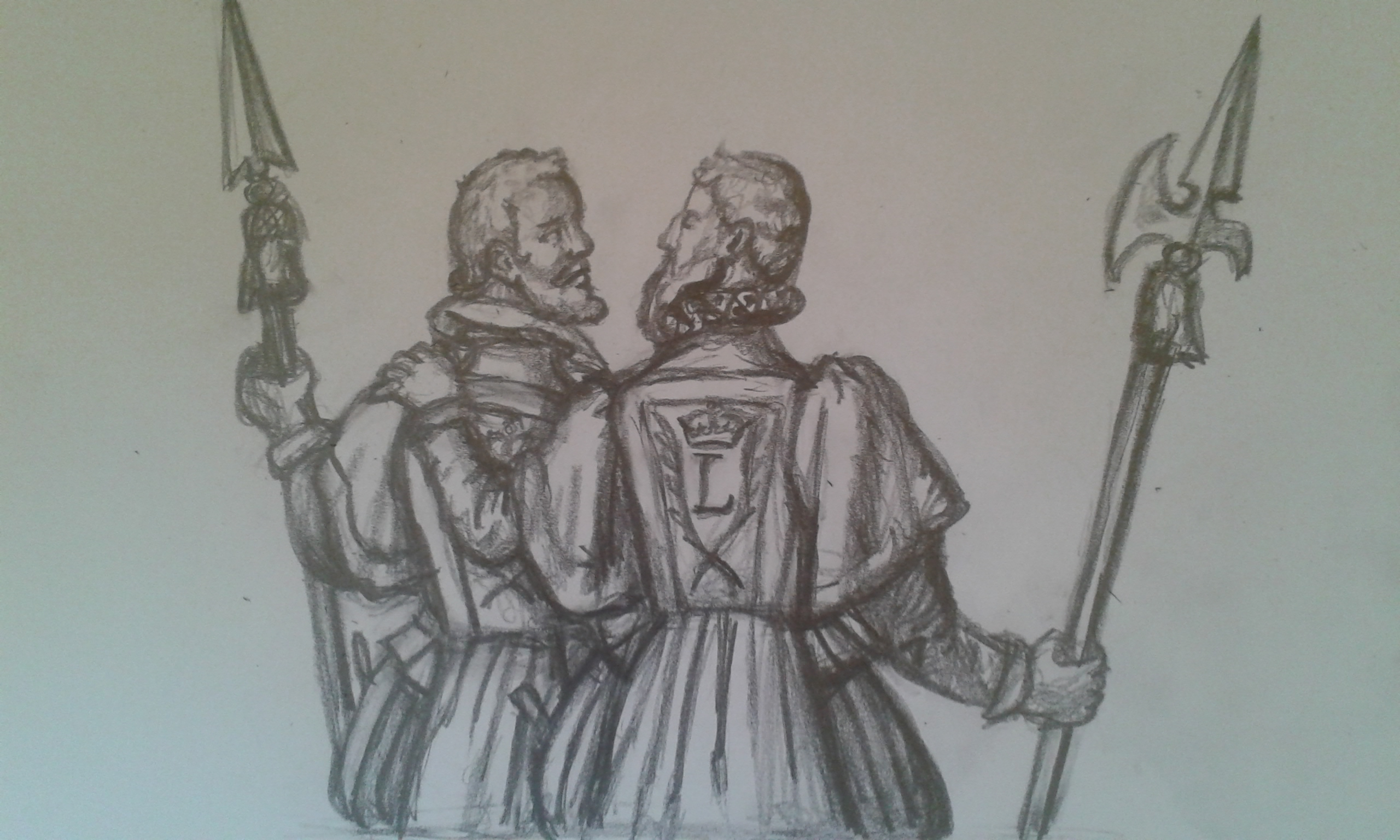
French Gardes Écossaises, from a 1610 drawing.

Hewerdine proposes that Henry VII may have copied the Scots bodyguard of the French king. In 1445, Charles VII of France had established two companies of Scots: one contained 100 men-at-arms; the second contains 104 archers designated as personal bodyguards. These Scottish archers were being recognized for their service and loyalty to the French crown. Part of the royal retinue and used for ceremonial purposes, they wore richly decorated and embroidered jackets displaying the royal badges. They were armed with swords and halberds.

The earliest documents mentioning individual Yeomen of the Guard date from September 1485 through January 1846. They are signet warrants (signed orders) from Henry to his Keeper of the Privy Seal, granting offices throughout the realm. The first is dated 16 September 1485, less than one month after the Battle of Bosworth, and about six weeks before his coronation. It appointed John Frye, yeoman of the king's guard, to the office of Searcher at the port of Bristol. From these warrants, Hewerdine was able to identify 32 Yeomen. Of these 32 warrants, 13 mention former service overseas, and 6 indicate presence at Bosworth Field. The remaining warrants mention "good and faithful service", which Hewerdine interprets as meaning either service overseas, or presence at Bosworth, or both. Service overseas refers to Henry's exile to Brittany after the execution of Henry Stafford, 2nd Duke of Buckingham. According to sources quoted by Hewerdine, Henry had a retinue of about 500 men while in Brittany, of which 200 followed him to France. It was probably from among these 200 followers that the original Guard was formed.

Under Henry VII the Guard had only 2 officers: the Captain, and the Clerk of the Cheque. The latter position (similar to a bookkeeper) was added by Henry later in his reign.

==== Size of the Guard ====
The only accounts which provide a size of the Guard during the early years of Henry VII's reign are Virgil, who gives a total of about 200, and Bacon, who gives a total of 50. Hewerdine has reconstructed a list of approximately 100 yeomen for the first year or two of Henry's reign. During the reigns of Henry VII and Henry VIII, Hewerdine has established that the size fluctuated greatly between the 1470s and about 1540. In April 1489, Henry VII took 200 yeomen to northern England, and a similarly sized contingent in 1500, when Henry visited Archduke Philip of Austria in Calais. However, for Arthur, Prince of Wales marriage with Catherine of Aragon in 1501, the Guard numbered 300. Eight years later (1509), the names of 193 Yeomen are listed in the Lord Chamberlain's records for Henry VII's funeral. However, 300 Yeomen appeared for Henry VIII's coronation. The greatest increase in Guard size occurred in 1513, for Henry VIII's campaign in France. Two years later, 170 Yeomen were discharged as part of an effort to reduce spending. During the 1520s, the royal household sizes and expenses were scaled back in the Eltham Ordinance. The Guard was probably reduced to 80 members at that time. Hewerdine proposes another possible reason for the inability to determine the number of Yeomen of the Guard. It appears that the Yeomen served at court for specified terms of duty. Some of the Household Ordinances indicate that some served quarterly, whilst others served daily.

=== Original duties ===
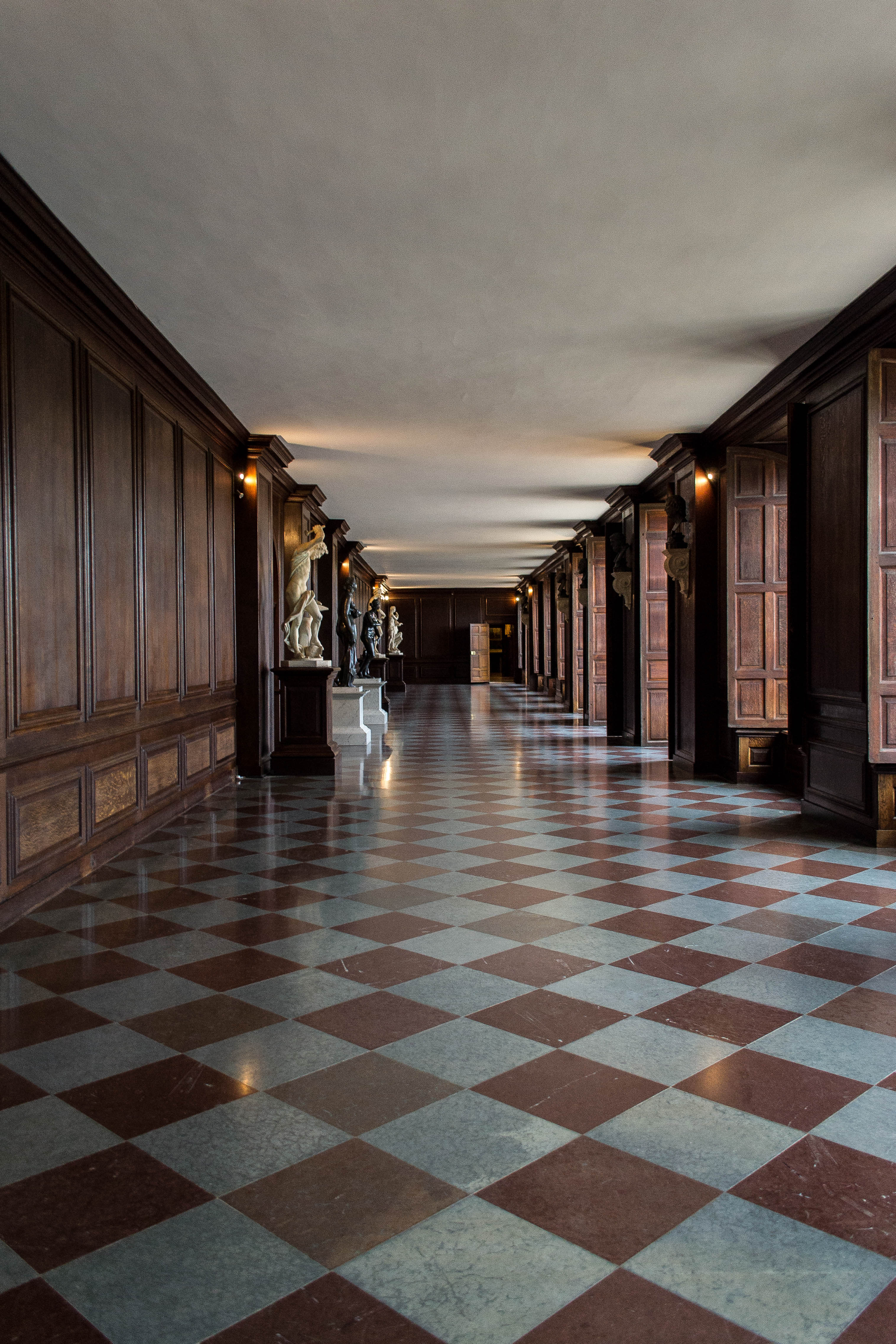
A long corridor in Hampton Court Palace. Here the Guard lined along the walls, forming a security cordon as the King passed.

Hewerdine mentions that the primary sources appear to make little distinction between the newly instituted Yeomen of the Guard, and the older positions of Yeomen of the Chamber, and the Yeomen of the Crown, which Henry VII kept as part of his household. Based upon the names of individuals, she suggests that the Yeomen of the Crown was the group of retainers who could serve as Yeomen of the Chamber or Yeomen of the Guard as openings occurred.

The Guard's primary function was protection. Hewerdine quotes one of Henry VII's heralds describing the Guard as: "evermore standing by the ways and passages upon a row in both the sides where the king's highness should from chamber to chamber or from one place to another at his goodly pleasure be removed". In other words, the Guard formed a physical security shield wherever he went in the palace. (Illustrations in this section are from the reign of Henry VIII. Very little remains of palace interiors from Henry VII's reign due to remodelling, for example, Windsor Castle, or demolition, such as Greenwich Palace, by later monarchs.)

==== In the King's Chambers ====
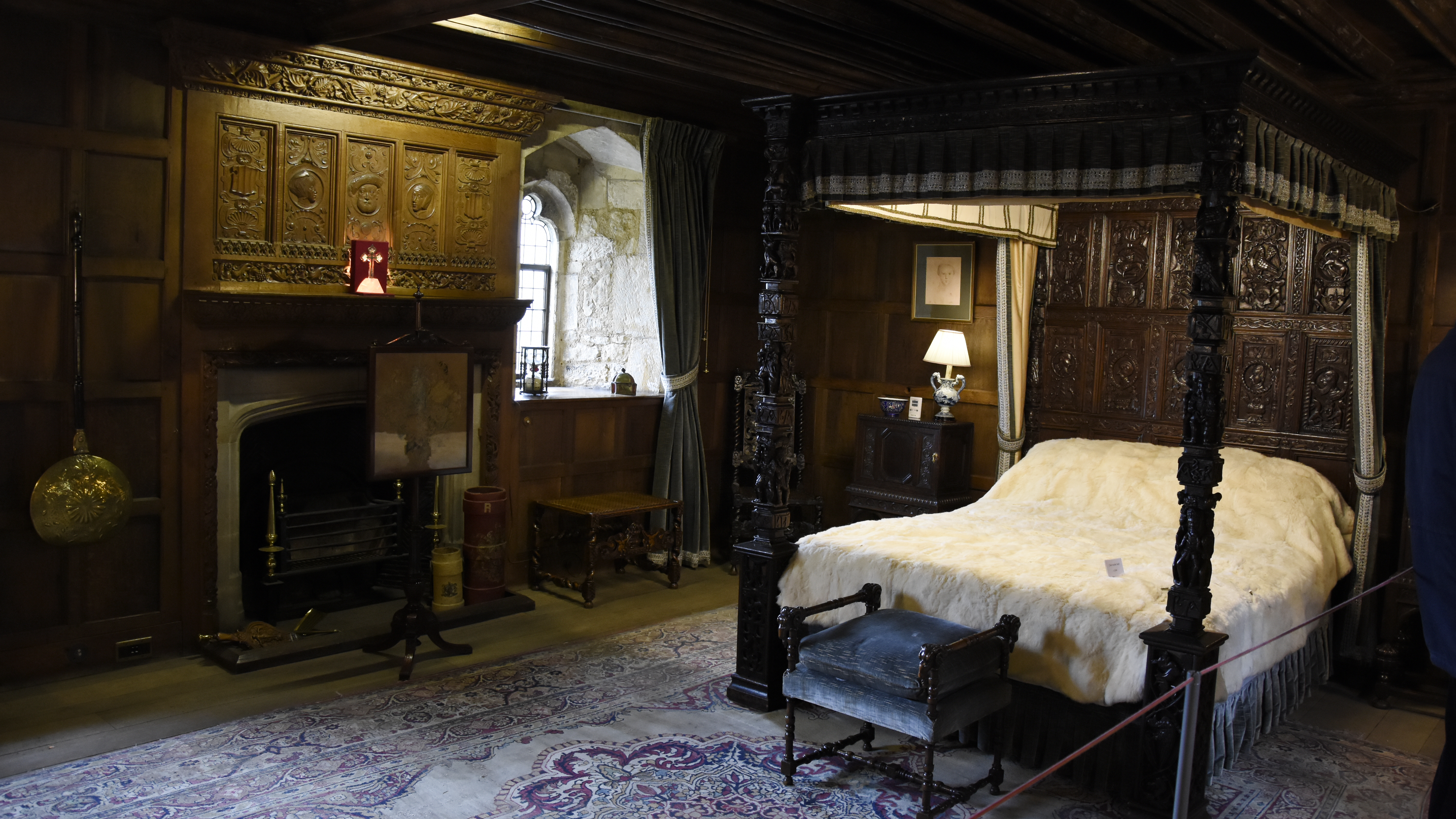
Henry VIII's bedchamber at Hever Castle.

Many of the daily duties performed by the yeomen who served the King are described in Yeoman. Additional duties performed included: (1) carrying torches when escorting the king to and from the royal chapel; (2) advising the Officer of the Kitchen when to prepare the King's meals; and (3) during meals, a yeoman usher was required to circulate throughout the King's Chambers, ensuring good service and good order.

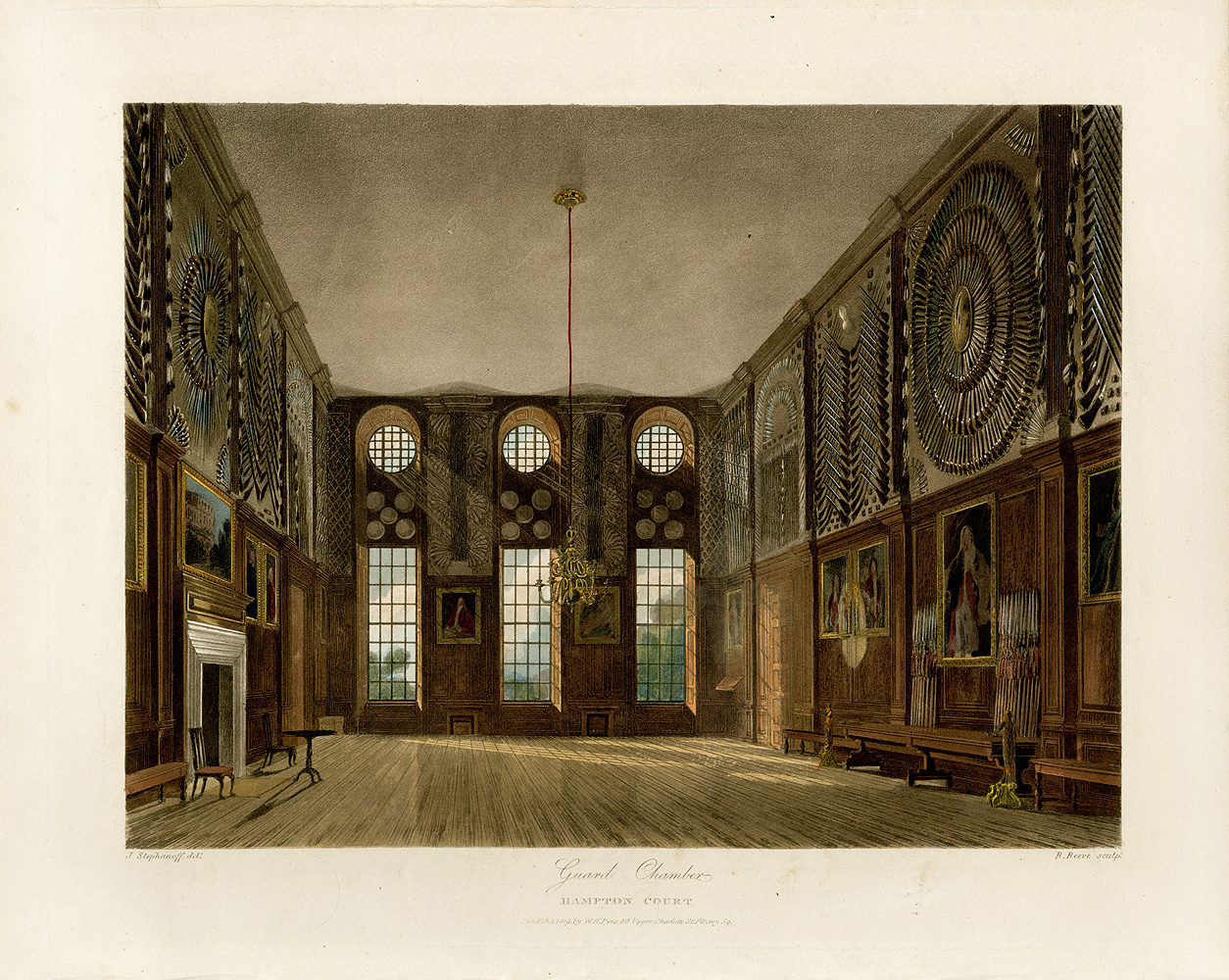
The Guard Chamber at Hampton Court. All visitors to the King's Chamber had to pass through this room.

In the evening, the All Night ritual would begin. A Yeoman Usher would assist a Gentleman Usher in collecting food and drink for the king, should he become hungry or thirsty overnight. The food and drink was given to the Squire for the Body who was on duty in the King's Chamber that night. The roster of the night watch was also given to the Squire, who was responsible for locking the chamber doors. Next came the making of the king's bed for the night. There were two versions of the ritual. The old order required that a yeoman would stab the straw mattress with a dagger, searching for anything that should not be there. Then the canvas and feather beds were laid over the straw mattress. The new order required that a yeoman would jump upon the canvas and feather beds, and roll around, spreading them out. After either procedure was carried out, precise instructions were followed for placing the sheets, pillows and covers on the bed.

Yeomen on night watch not serving within the King's Chamber were required to sit outside in the Guard Chamber. Four times each night, the yeomen locked inside the King's Chamber would patrol the king's chamber, and the yeomen in the Guard Chamber would patrol the palace. They were alert to signs of fire, any disturbances that might wake the king, or possible attacks on the king's person.

==== At royal events ====
There are few mentions of the Guard at royal events during Henry VII's reign, and they are not detailed. When Prince Arthur was christened in Winchester Cathedral in 1486, five Yeomen of the Guard controlled access to the specially-constructed stage erected for the royal font. When Princess Margaret was christened in Westminster Abbey in 1489, 120 torches were held in front of the chapel by knights, squires, gentlemen, and Yeomen of the Crown. During the two-week-long celebration of the marriage of Prince Arthur to Catherine of Aragon in 1501, the Guard is mentioned several times in the herald's record. When Prince Henry was made Prince of Wales in 1504, some Yeomen of the Guard kept vigil (watched) with him during the night before the ceremony.

At Henry VII's funeral in May 1509, twelve chosen Yeomen of the Guard, garbed in black livery, carried the royal coffin from the west door of Old St Paul's Cathedral to the high altar for the lying in state. The following day the Yeomen carried their former leader to Westminster Abbey. The rest of the Guard, also in black livery, marched on foot, holding their halberds upside down (reversed). One month later, three hundred Yeomen of the Guard participated in the procession on the eve of Henry VIII's coronation. They wore Henry VII's livery of green and white. Most Yeomen carried bows and arrows, whilst the others carried halberds or other weapons.

There were various annual festivals and special ceremonies in which the Guard most probably participated but for which there are no records earlier than the reign of Henry VIII. The Whitsuntide feast at Windsor Castle in "honour of God, St. George and the noble Order of the Garter" is described in detail from May 1519. It includes the processions, church service, and the feast afterwards. Another annual feast was the Easter celebration, which can only be inferred from the royal expense accounts.

=== Changes under King Henry VIII ===
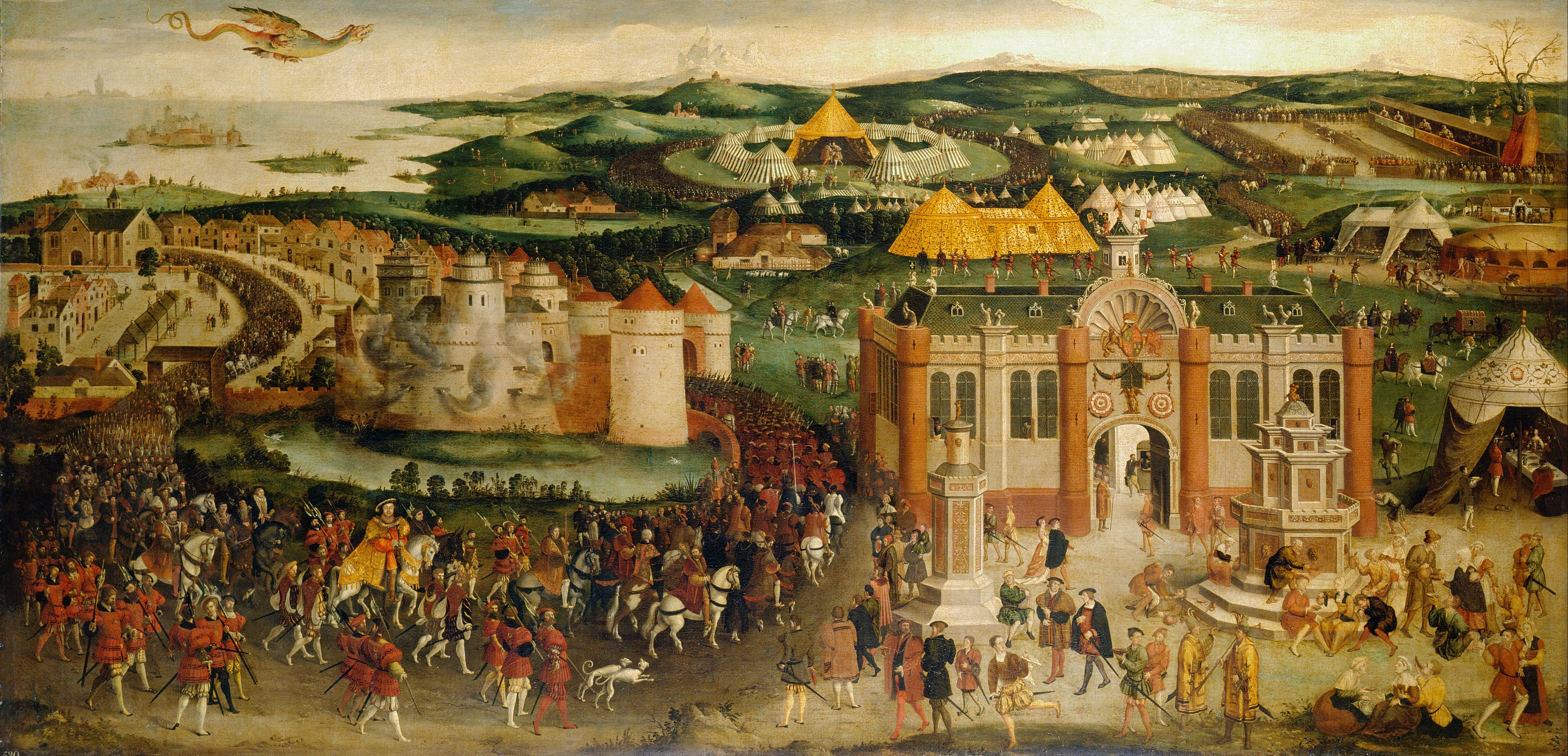
ca 1545 painting of the Field of the Cloth of Gold, held near Calais, where Henry VIII met Francis I of France in 1520.

Henry VIII was ostentatious, and enjoyed impressing foreign dignitaries. Hewerdine quotes the impression made on the Venetian ambassador by his visit to Henry VIII at Richmond Palace in 1515:

... we were conducted to the presence, through sundry chambers all hung with most beautiful tapestry, figured in gold and silver and in silk, passing down the ranks of the bodyguard, which consists of 300 halberdiers in silver breast-plates and pikes in their hands; and, by God, they were all as big as giants, so that the display was very grand." The following year (1520), Henry VIII commanded the Captain of the Guard, Sir Henry Mamey, to select 200 of his tallest men to accompany the King to his meeting with Francis I, king of France, at the Field of the Cloth of Gold. 100 Yeomen were to be mounted on "suitable horses".

- barracks moved to St James's Palace
- issued harquebus

==== Eltham Ordinance of January 1526 ====
This Household Ordinance is the first to mention regulations for the Yeomen of the Guard. It described the need to reduce the size of the Guard from its wartime strength back down to a peacetime level. The surviving copy of the Ordinance has left a space for that number to be written in – it never was. Holinshed reported that the number was 84.

=== Elizabeth I and the Gunpowder Plot ===
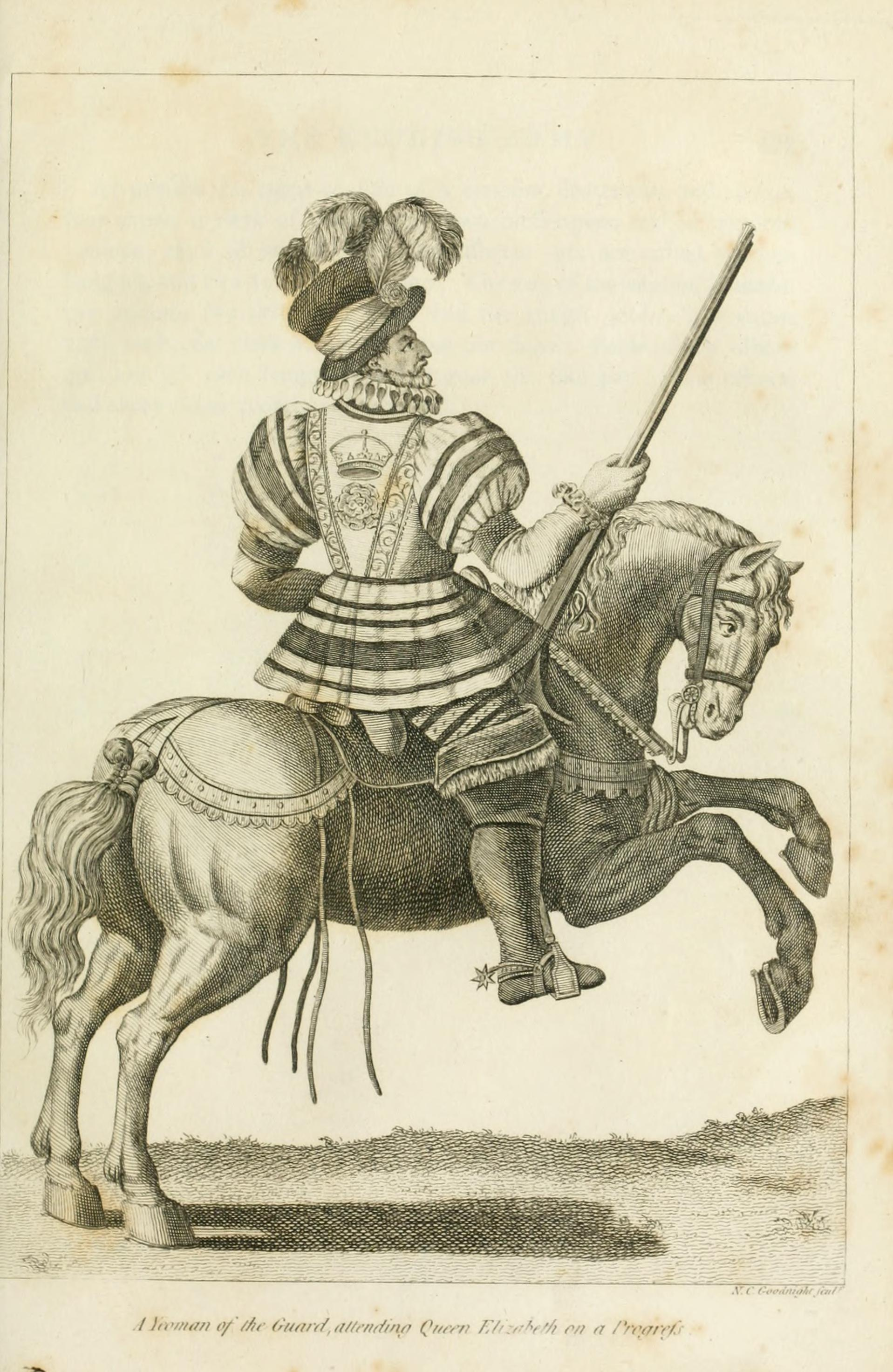
Yeoman of the Guard of the reign of Queen Elizabeth I

- search of Parliament

=== During English Civil War ===
- protection of Charles I
- protection of Charles II after regicide

=== Reorganization under King Charles II ===
With the Restoration of the monarchy, the King's bodyguard was re-formed: "For Our Yeomen of the Guard we have made a new Establishment, there being added to the captain a lieutenant, ensign and four corporals being commissioned officers; and we have continued the Clerk of the Cheque and one hundred yeomen of our guard to be in constant waiting". At any one time, one of the commissioned officers was to be "always in waiting" to receive orders; and forty yeomen were to be "constantly upon duty as well, to attend upon Our Person".

As previously, the Yeomen of the Guard attended in the Great Chamber (also called the Guard Chamber) of the palace. According to the Ordinances made by Charles II for the government of his Household, the Yeomen of the Guard were there to serve "not only the safety of Our Person but the honour of Our Court", and he ordained that "none hereafter be sworn and enrolled of that Band that is not of tall personage, strong, active and of manly presence" and that such persons "according to Our prerogative [may] be chosen out of the servants of Our nobility if we please or where else they may be found".

=== 19th century ===
In the eighteenth century some 40 Yeomen were on duty daily, and 20 at night. This stopped in 1813, and thereafter only one division was required daily until about 1837.

== Modern day ==
=== Membership ===
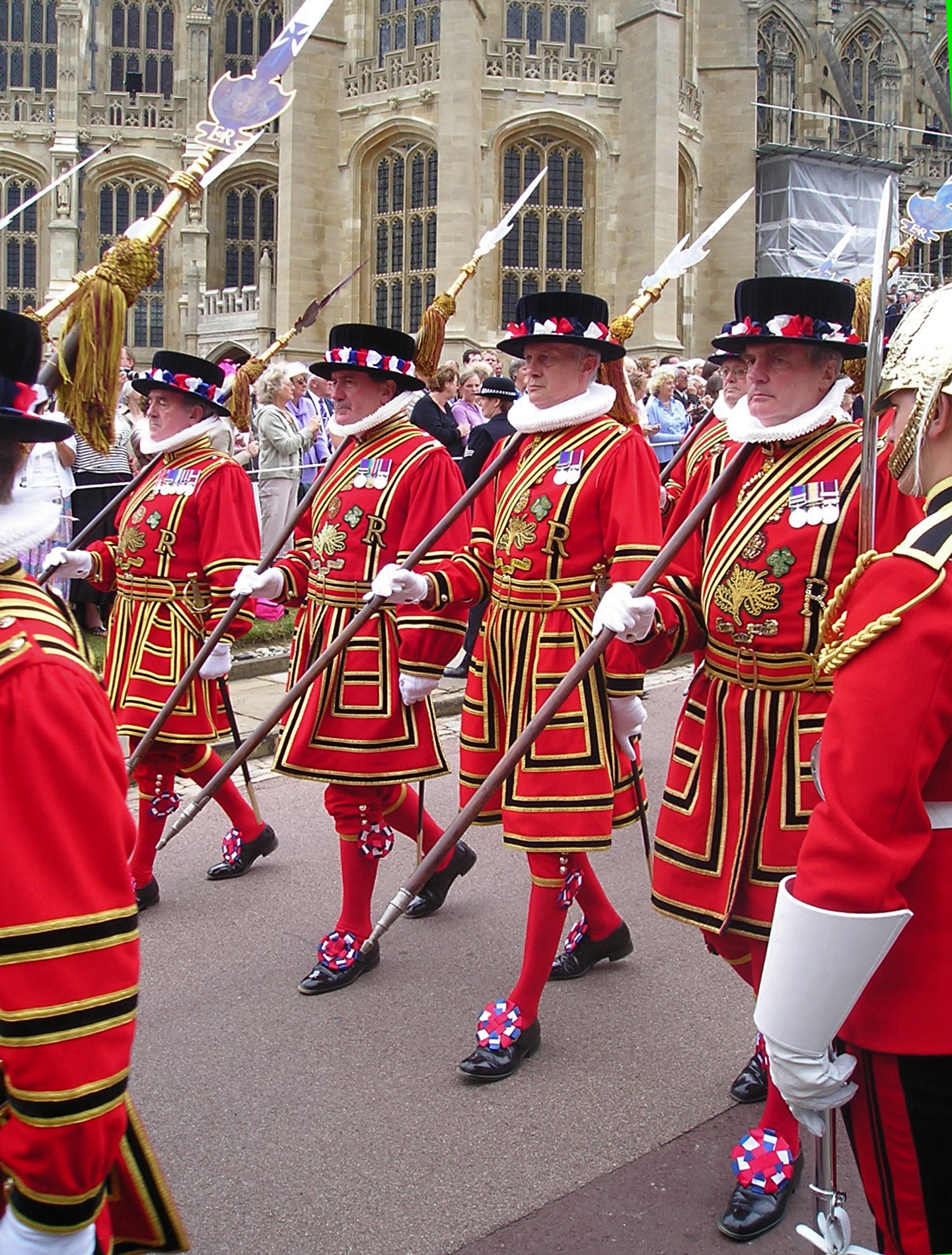
Yeomen of the Guard in the procession to the annual service of the Order of the Garter at Windsor Castle

From 1830 candidates must have served in either the British Army or Royal Marines. In 1934, the first Royal Air Force candidate was accepted. In 2018, the first Royal Navy Warrant Officer was appointed. Candidates (both servicemen and servicewomen) must have completed at least 22 years of service, attained at least the rank of Sergeant or Petty Officer, and been awarded the Long Service and Good Conduct Medal. On appointment, the age required is between 42 and 55. All Yeomen retire at 70 years of age. The corps' size varied slightly over the times. Once, the Guard had a limit of 64 Yeomen and Officers available for appointments. As of 2022, it was made up of 73 servicemen and officers.

=== Duties ===
Today, the Yeomen of the Guard have a purely ceremonial role. As a visual reminder of their origin, the Yeomen still wear the red and gold uniforms of the Tudor period. Armed with a sword (which is always sheathed) and an ornamental partisan, they escort the sovereign. The Guard is mustered on demand, about eight times each year. This includes an annual Roll Call and the Sovereign's Inspection (which has been changed to once every 4–5 years). They are in attendance at various occasions such as at the annual Royal Maundy service, the Epiphany Service in the Chapel Royal at St James's Palace, installations of Knights of the Garter, investiture of the prince of Wales, lying-in-state, the funeral of the Sovereign, as well as all investitures, and summer garden parties at Buckingham Palace. One of their most famous duties is to perform a ceremonial search of the cellars of the Palace of Westminster prior to the State Opening of Parliament, which remembers the Gunpowder Plot of 1605.

== Uniform ==
=== Tudor livery of green and white ===
There are only two contemporary records of the livery of the Yeomen of the Guard during Henry VII's reign. The first was written by a herald, who was present for the marriage of Prince Arthur to Catherine of Aragon in November 1501. Hewerdine quotes the herald's description:

The yeomen of the Guard were clothed in 'large jackets of damask, white and green, goodly embroidered both on their breasts before and also on their backs behind, with round garlands of vine branches, beset before richly with spangles of silver and gilt, and in the middle a red rose, beaten with goldsmiths' work, with bright halberds in their hands'.

Hewerdine interprets this written description as referring to horsemen's coats. These were close-fitting to the upper body, and expanded below the waist into a flared skirt to cover the thighs when the rider was on horseback.

The second record is an illuminated border from the 1527 Treaty of Amiens. This is the earliest known illustration of the Bodyguard. Two yeomen are illustrated, wearing either a striped tunic or sleeveless jacket of green and white. The neckline is a gold band, and there is a gold crowned rose on the chest. One yeoman wears scarlet hose and a gold-coloured cap, whilst the other wears white hose and a black cap. (A photograph appears on page 60 of Hewerdine's thesis.)

When members of the Guard were performing their duties as yeomen of the chamber, they were furnished with watching clothing for their night-time watches around the king's chamber. The color was described either as russet cloth or tawny medley. Neither color has been identified with certainty. For royal funerals, the Guard wore black.

=== Scarlet and gold livery ===
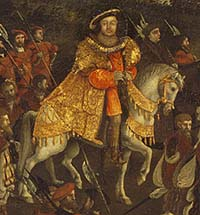
Yeomen of the Guard (top left) attending Henry VIII at the Field of the Cloth of Gold (as depicted in 1545).

In common with other members of the King's household, the Guard wore scarlet for Henry VIII's coronation in 1509. Thereafter they resumed the traditional green and white livery, but periodically red was worn (most notably at the Field of the Cloth of Gold in 1520); and in June 1526 the colour appears to have been officially changed to red. From this time the Guard began on a regular basis to wear the scarlet and gold livery that is familiar today, albeit the styling varied over the years.

Records survive from Henry VIII's reign regarding the special care and storage of the scarlet coats. In February 1528, two Yeomen of the Guard and four women were paid 6 shillings for two days work of brushing and airing out the coats. The coats were kept in large containers known as standards. The coat standards were not stored in one of the palaces or usual wardrobe buildings. They were kept at rented locations. As Henry VIII's court moved around, the coat standards would accompany their retinue train. In 1519, the Guard's Clerk of the Cheque received 3 shillings 8 pence to rent two carts to move the coat standards from Greenwich Palace to Richmond Palace. The next July, the Clerk received 6 pounds 2 shillings for transportation of the coat standards from London to Calais and Guisnes and then back to London. Another 6 shillings 8 pence was spent for renting accommodations to store the coats and the Guards' accoutrements while they were in Calais for Henry VII's meeting with Francis I of France.

=== Officers' ranks and today's uniform ===
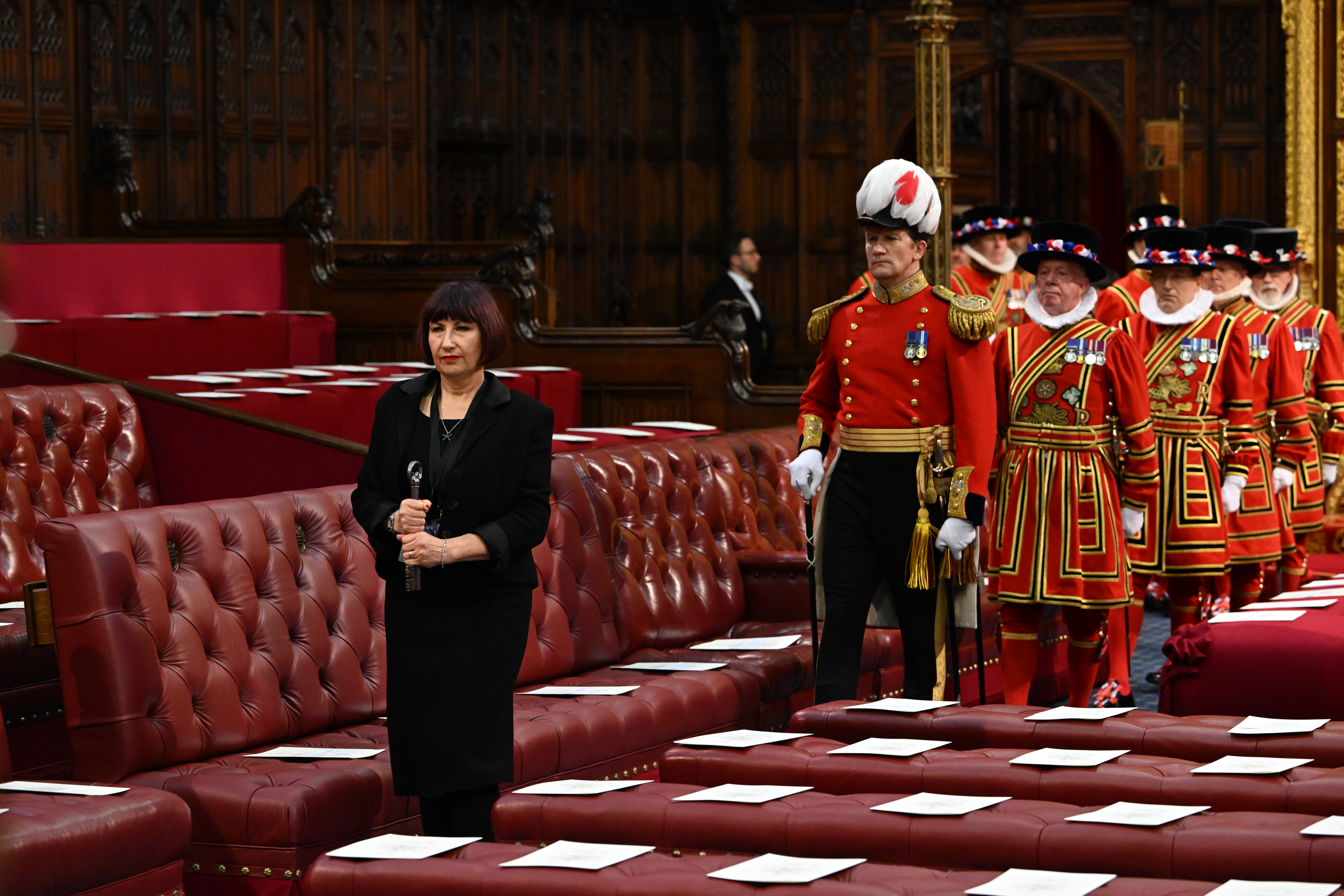
An Officer with a detachment of Yeomen, on their way to search the cellars of the Houses of Parliament on the day of the State Opening. A palace official carrying the key proceeds them.

The senior officer is the Captain of the Yeomen of the Guard, which is filled by the current Deputy Chief Whip in the House of Lords. Officers ranking below the Captain are Lieutenant, Clerk of the Cheque and Adjutant, Ensign or Standard Bearer, and the Exon. In common with other branches of the military, a standardised uniform for officers was not adopted until the 18th century. By the early 19th century the officers of the Bodyguard were wearing red coatees, blue trousers and a cocked hat (much as they do today). In the 20th century it is described as a scarlet cloth double-breasted coatee with gold epaulettes and dark blue collar and cuffs; the skirts turned back with white cloth. Nine buttons in each row down the front, and two on the skirts behind. The buttons have a rose, shamrock and thistle device, topped by a crown; and a rose, shamrock and thistle appear within the gold embroidery of the epaulettes, collar, cuff slashes, sword flaps and also on the skirts of the coatee. The trousers are blue, with a gold stripe, and the hat has a 'General's plume' of 11-inch white swan feathers with red feathers under.

Aiguillettes are worn by the Captain, the Lieutenant, the Clerk of the Cheque & Adjutant and the Ensign, but not by the Exon. A 'gold stick' (ebony, with a gold top) is carried by the captain, and 'silver sticks' by the other officers.

=== Non-Commissioned Officers' ranks and insignia ===
Non-commissioned officers are the two Messenger Sergeant Majors (MSM), the Divisional Sergeant Majors (DSM) heading each division, the Yeoman Bed Goers (YBG), the Yeoman Bed Hangers (YBH), and the Yeomen.

The badges of rank are worn on the right upper arm: The MSM wear four gold chevrons point down surmounted by a gold crown. The DSM are recognisable by four white chevrons surmounted by a gold crown. All Sergeant majors are distinguished by their black batons, which they carry instead of the partisan.

=== Differences between the Yeoman of the Guard and the Yeoman Warders ===
The Yeomen of the Guard, the original "Beefeaters", are often confused with the Yeomen Warders of His Majesty's Royal Palace and Fortress the Tower of London, who are also known as "Beefeaters", a similar but distinct body. The Yeoman Warders wear their daily "undress" dark blue uniform and only on ceremonial occasions wear the Yeomen of the Guard's distinctive uniform that consists of a royal red tunic with purple facings and stripes and gold lace ornaments, red knee-breeches and red stockings, flat hat, and black shoes with red, white and blue rosettes. The gold-embroidered emblems on the back and front of the coats consist of the crowned Tudor Rose, the shamrock and the thistle, the motto Dieu et mon droit, and the royal cypher of the reigning sovereign (currently CIIIR for "Carolus Rex"). The State Dress is sometimes worn without a white ruff, which is reserved for highly official occasions.

The item of uniform that distinguishes The Yeomen of the Guard from the Tower Warders is the red cross-belt or baldric, worn from the left shoulder. This is a relic from the time when the Guard, and not the Warders, carried the harquebus.

== Standard ==
Traditionally, the corps carried a standard, in the manner of army regiments. The corps' first standard was supposedly destroyed in a fire at St James's Palace in 1809. King George VI presented a replacement standard to the corps in 1938. This was replaced by a new standard presented by Queen Elizabeth II in 1985.

The standard is a crimson-coloured damask – in the centre is the corps' badge of a combined rose, thistle and shamrock, with the royal cypher of the reigning monarch either side, and the royal motto Dieu et mon Droit below. Either side of this device are ribbons containing two of the corps' battle honours, Tournai and Boulogne. In each corner are symbols representing the various royal houses that the corps has served:

- Top left: a crowned hawthorn bush and the letters 'HR', representing King Henry VII and the legend that the crown was discovered by the guard in a hawthorn bush following the Battle of Bosworth Field.
- Top right: a crowned thistle, representing King James I and the personal union of England and Scotland.
- Bottom left: a white horse on a green mound surmounted by the crown, representing the House of Hanover.
- Bottom right: the Round Tower of Windsor Castle crowned, representing the House of Windsor.

== Battle honours ==
- Field of Stoke, 1487
- Boulogne, 1492
- Blackheath, 1497
- **Tournai 1513**
- **Boulogne, 1544**
- Boyne, 1690
- Dettingen, 1743

Honours in bold are displayed on the corps' standard.
