= Archers' Hall =

Archery clubhouse in Edinburgh, Scotland

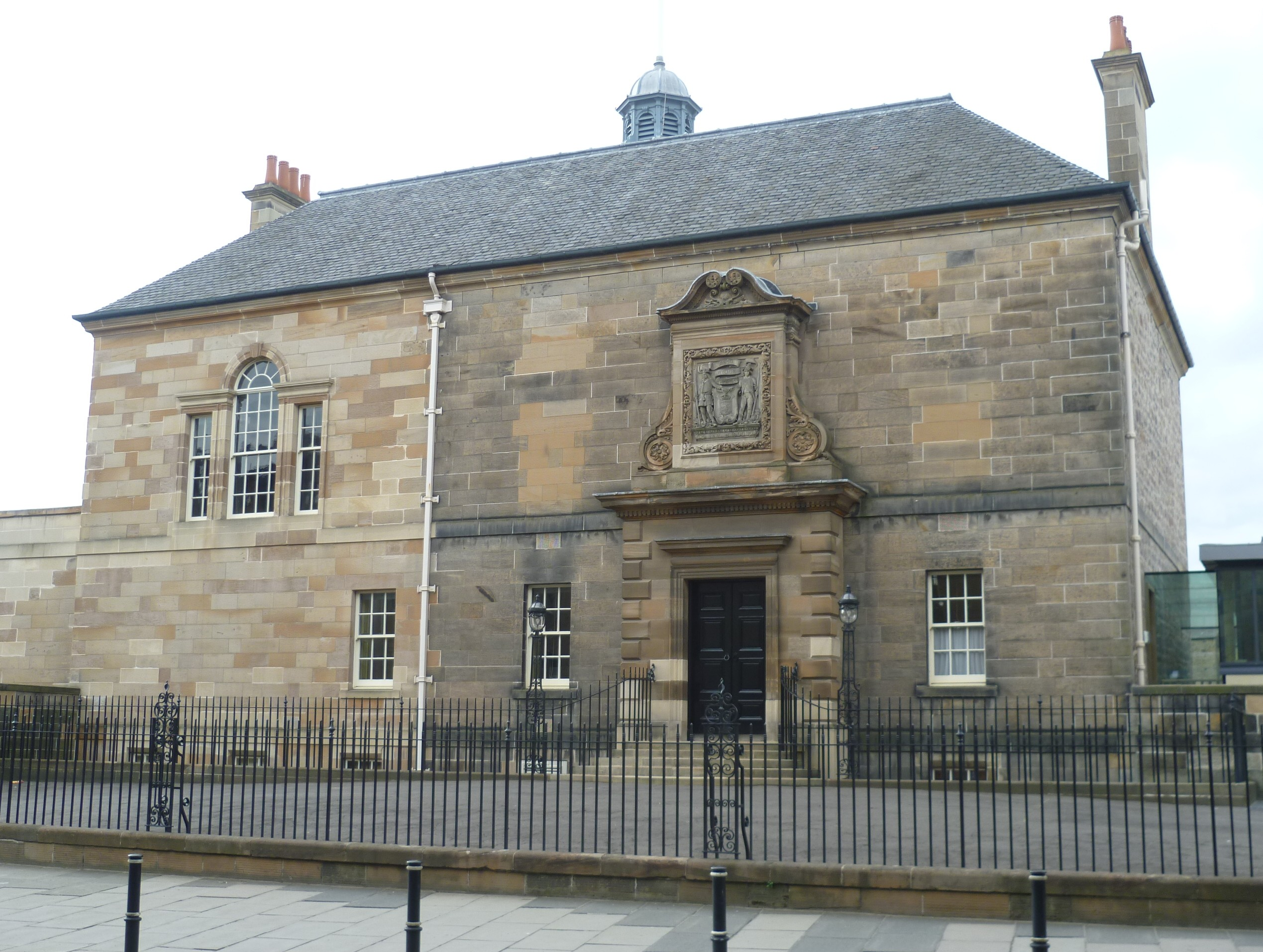
- Archers' Hall
- Interactive map of the Archers' Hall area

General information
- Location: 66 Buccleuch St, Edinburgh, Scotland
- Coordinates: 55°56′32″N 3°11′04″W
- Construction started: 15 August 1776
- Completed: 1777
- Owner: Bowmen Limited

Design and construction
- Architects: Alexander Laing; Robert R. Anderson; A. F. Balfour Paul

The Archers' Hall is the club house of the Royal Company of Archers, the Sovereign's Bodyguard in Scotland. It is located at 66 Buccleuch Street in the Southside of Edinburgh, and has been used by the company for over 230 years. Building commenced on 15 August 1776, and was completed in 1777 to designs by Alexander Laing. When the foundation stone was laid in 1776, two lines of Latin were inscribed on a plate which was set in the stone. These lines, beginning Nulla Caledoniam, were taken from:

Ecce pharetratos mavortia pectora Scotos,
Hostibus ut fortes tela tremenda ferunt
Nulla Caledoniam gens unquam impune lacesset,
Usque sagittiferis robur et ardor inest

Behold the Scots, furnished with quivers from Mars' breasts,
To their enemies, however furious, they will send forth tremendous missiles.
No people whosoever who provoke Caledonia go unpunished,
Oak and ardour imbue the archers through and through.

The Royal Company of Archers were granted the motto "Nemo me impune lacessit" by a Royal charter of Queen Anne, 1713.

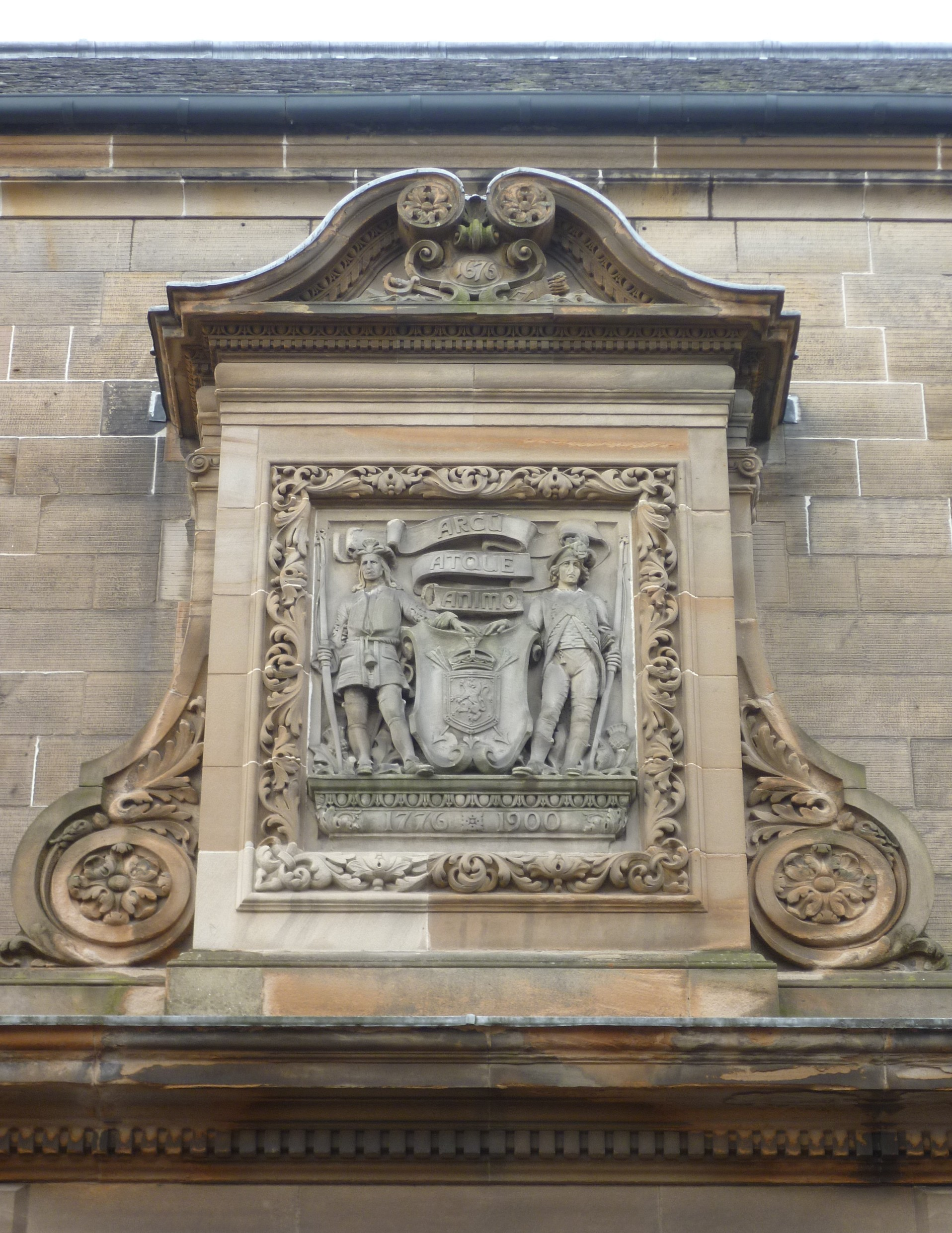
The Company's coat of arms above the Hall entrance

The building was extended in 1900 by Robert Rowand Anderson and his partner, A. F. Balfour Paul. The principal hall inside measures 40 by 24 feet (12.2 by 7.3 m), and is 18 feet (5.5 m) high. Two other rooms of 18 by 19 feet (5.5 by 5.8 m) are contained in the building, as well as a kitchen, cellars, lobby, and other apartments. The ground behind the house was laid out into a bowling green, maintained by the Edinburgh Bowling Club until its redevelopment in 2008. The hall serves as a venue for various dinners and meetings of the Royal Company of Archers and the club. An external lodge, adjacent to the hall, houses an indoor changing rooms, shooting gallery and a bow workshop.

Archers' Hall is a category A listed building, a building "of regional or more than local importance". There is a proposal to demolish the lodge.

In 2008 09 the corner lodge, existing archery butts and bowling pavilion were demolished to improve club facilities. Inside, an 8-person lift was installed to connect the basement, principal and main hall levels, and a new access through the north façade was built. The work also included repairs to existing stonework, and replacement of missing sections using natural stone chosen to match. The work was carried out by LDN Architects. Since 9 February 2008 the club's commercial entity is Bowmen Limited, a registered private company. It caused considerable distress when Edinburgh Bowling Club, founded in 1848 and said to be Edinburgh's oldest, was obliged by the Royal Company of Archers to vacate the site. The Edinburgh Bowling Club subsequently disbanded and closed.

The Archers' Hall development involved an extension to house archery practice ranges and the creation of fifteen two and three-storey multiple occupancy residences to provide accommodation for around 75 University of Edinburgh postgraduate students which the university has taken on a long lease. The project makes imaginative use of the space available and is focused around a lawn area where the original bowling green was. Among those organisations involved were Sir Robert McAlpine, Harley Haddow engineers and LDN Architects. Public access to the Archers' Hall is available by appointment.
