= Paul MacKenzie (physician) =

Scottish physician, soldier and sportsman (1919–2014)

Paul MacKenzie TD CStJ
- Born: Percy Arthur Paul Peter MacKenzie; 31 July 1919; Edinburgh, Scotland
- Died: 16 September 2014 (aged 95); Edinburgh, Scotland
- Education: University of Edinburgh
- Occupations: Physician; soldier; sportsman
- Spouse: Barbara Ashmead-Bartlett (m. 1956)
- Children: 2

Percy Arthur Paul Peter MacKenzie TD CStJ (31 July 1919 – 16 September 2014) was a Scottish physician, soldier and sportsman. He was a pioneer of modern sports medicine. He was the founder of the Glenshee Ski Rescue Service and joint founder of the British Association of Sports Medicine.

== Life ==
He was born on 31 July 1919 the son of Major Lionel do Amaral MacKenzie and his wife Mary Isobel (née Rusk). His father was born in Rio de Janeiro, the son of Peter Alexander Cameron Mackenzie, and his Brazilian wife Anita (née do Amaral). Lionel died in 1927 aged 36 from an accidental insulin overdose in treatment of his diabetes.

MacKenzie was educated at Edinburgh Academy and then joined the British Army in 1938. He saw active service in the World War II as an officer in the Border Regiment serving under Lord Mountbatten in Burma at the rank of captain. After the war he studied medicine at the University of Edinburgh, qualifying at the age of 33, going on to be a GP at Bridge of Earn in Perthshire. He lived at Forgandenny.

A keen skier from the age of ten he skied regularly at Lech am Arlberg in Austria staying with his friend, the Olympic skier Othmar Schneider. As an archer he won 27 trophies. He was also a keen golfer.

He died on 16 September 2014 aged 95, and was buried with his parents in the western extension to Grange Cemetery in south Edinburgh.

== Family ==
He married Barbara Jean Ashmead-Barlett at St Giles Cathedral in Edinburgh in 1956. They had a daughter, Fiona, and a son, Ruari.

== Positions of Note ==
- Member of the Royal Company of Archers (the Queen's bodyguard in Scotland)
- Fellow of the Faculty of Sports and Exercise Medicine
- Member and Medical Advisor to The Royal and Ancient Golf Club of St Andrews
