= Royal Company of Archers =

Scottish military unit founded 1676

The Royal Company of Archers, The King's Bodyguard for Scotland
- Badge of the Royal Company of Archers
- Active: 1676–present
- Country: Scotland
- Type: Private archery club
- Role: Royal bodyguard
- Size: 530
- Part of: Sovereign's Bodyguard
- Garrison/HQ: Edinburgh
- Mottos: Dat gloria vires Nemo me impune lacessit Dulce pro patria periculum
- Colours: two standards
- March: Archer's March

Commanders
- Captain-General: The Duke of Buccleuch and Queensberry

Insignia
- Hackle: Eagle Feathers; Number dependent on rank

The Royal Company of Archers, The King's Bodyguard for Scotland, is a ceremonial unit that serves as the Sovereign's bodyguard in Scotland—a role it has performed since 1822 during the reign of King George IV when the company provided a personal bodyguard to the King on his visit to Scotland. It is currently known as the King's Bodyguard for Scotland or, more often and colloquially, The Royal Company. It is located in Edinburgh, the capital city of Scotland. The Royal Company of Archers has a long history in Scotland as a body that celebrated both the recreation and talent of local archers. As a body established by the Monarch, the company has a long history of unique prizes, influential supporters, and ceremonial roles. It has an associated charity, the Royal Company of Archers Charitable Trust, dedicated to helping disadvantaged individuals with their health and wellbeing in Scotland.

== Early history ==
During the 17th and 18th centuries in Scotland, a muster or military rendezvous, called a "wapinschaw" ('weapon-show') was held at least twice a year. Men were summoned by the sheriff and other civil magistrates to attend a muster in their respective counties at least 20 days in advance of the meeting. The civil magistrates, in conjunction with commissioners appointed by the King, supervised this body of militia, divided it into companies, and appointed captains. People of all stations were obligated to play their part in each rendezvous and to show up equipped in military kit that conformed to their respective ranks. The Lords and Barons were required to provide a list of the members of their company and the weapons they brought with them to the civil magistrates and King's commissioners. The commissioners then compiled a list of the whole muster, which was presented to the King.

By using the old laws of wapinschaw, the Jacobites formed a plan to institutionalise a military corps, under a pretext of sports and recreation, that could be assembled by an authority as occasion offered. A society for encouraging and exercising archery had already been formed in 1676, as a private archery club. This society sought and acquired the patronage of the Scottish Privy Council, which provided a prize that was shot for by the company's members. The company consisted of distinguished nobles and gentlemen of the day. The Marquis of Athole was the company's Captain-General in 1670; and they held frequent meetings during the reign of the royal brothers. No traces of this company exist for some time after the Glorious Revolution. Upon the accession of Queen Anne and the death of the Marquis of Athole, they appointed Sir George Mackenzie, then Lord Tarbat and Secretary of State, and afterwards Earl of Cromarty, their Captain-General.

Having chosen a new leader, the society obtained from Queen Anne a charter under the Great Seal of Scotland, establishing it as a corporation by Letters Patent, dated 31 December 1713 into a Royal Company. These letters of patent revived and ratified, on their behalf, the old laws and acts of Parliament that favoured archery; gave them power to admit members; choose a President and council; appoint commanding officers; to meet and act under their officers' supervision in military form for weapon-shawing as often as they should think convenient; and prohibited the civil magistrate from interrupting their activities. These rights and privileges were designed after the mode of feudal tenure, and to hold them in the blanch fee (reddendo) of Her Majesty and her successors, therefore annually acknowledging a pair of barbed arrows. The society received these rights and privileges in its charter from Queen Anne in 1704. In return for being endowed with "perpetual access to all public butts, plains and pasturages legally allotted for shooting arrows", the Royal Company is required to present to the Sovereign three barbed arrows on request.

The first such weapon-shawing was held on 14 June 1714, with the Marquis of Athole as the company's Captain-General, even though he was in his 80s by this time, and the Earl of Wemyss as Lieutenant-General at the head of about 50 archers. On that occasion, the society shot a silver arrow, presented to them by the City of Edinburgh, at Leith. By the following year, the company had doubled in number and was led by David Wemyss, 4th Earl of Wemyss after the death of the Marquis of Athole.

After the Jacobite rising of 1715, no parade was held for nine years, but they resumed under James Hamilton, 5th Duke of Hamilton on 4 August 1724 at Musselburgh. However, after 1734 public parades were discontinued until the Napoleonic Wars were over.

== Traditions ==
The Royal Company's traditions relate to its reason for formation, the archery competition. To further this, it offers thirteen prizes that were at some time in the past competed for annually. Many are retained to the present day.

=== The Musselburgh Arrow ===
The tradition of shooting the silver Musselburgh Arrow, a small arrow presented by the town of Musselburgh in 1603, predates the creation of the Royal Company and follows in the traditions of other burghs of Scotland. A new, large arrow was presented in 1713. The victor of the shooting retains the arrow for a year, and on handing it over to the next victor appends a medal to the arrow with an engraved personal motto, all of which are held by the Royal Company. One hundred and three such medals were held by the company by 1816.

=== Three Arrows ===
By the 1820s, three more arrows were also presented by the cities of Peebles (1626), Selkirk (1675) and Edinburgh.

The Edinburgh Arrow was presented by the City of Edinburgh in 1709, and the medals appended to it are in gold. The winner was at one time entitled to a prize of five pounds Sterling from the city, but this fell into abeyance after 1716. The 'Edinburgh Arrow' is an annual competition competed for at the nearby Bruntsfield Links. It is the rule of the prize "1. That the said Silver Arrow be shot for at the rovers in Leith Links, upon the second Monday of June yearly, at ten of the clock in the forenoon if the day be favourable; and if not, that the shooting be adjourned to the next fair Monday." 16 June 2009 marked the 300th anniversary of the first competition for The Edinburgh Arrow.

The three arrows are now depicted on one of the standards. Until the institution of the third prize, only a pair of arrows was presented to the Sovereign on demand, this now increased to three.

=== The Silver Punch Bowl and Ladle ===
The fifth prize is The Silver Punch Bowl and Ladle presented to the company in 1720, and likewise had medals appended to it by its winner. The Bowl made to the value of £20, and the bill for its construction and the engraving on it came to £22, 13s. 9d. sterling. It had inscribed on one side the common seal of the company, and on the opposite side the reverse of the seal; and between those, on one side a Saint Andrew, and on the other the following inscription: "Edinburgh, 20th June 1720. — The Councill of the Royall Company of Archers, viz., Mr David Drummond, Praeses, Thomas Kincaid, John Nairn, James Ross, Robert Lowis, John Lowis, John Carnegy, George Drummond, Tresr., William Murray and James Lowis, clerks, ordered this piece of plate to be furnished out of the stock of the Company, and to be shot for as ane annual pryze. at rovers by the said Company, as the Councill for the time shall appoint"

=== The Pagodas Medal ===
This prize consists of a medal, one of two which were presented to the Company in 1793 by Major James Spens, The 73rd Regiment (Royal Highland East Indies). (Note: Later the 2nd/42nd Royal Highlanders better known as the Black Watch.) They were made from fifty "pagodas", being part of the money actually paid by Tippu Sultan to the allies at the Treaty of Seringapatam in 1792.

=== Silver Vase and Gold Medal ===
A prize by the General John Earl of Hopetoun commemorating the 1822 visit by King George IV is also competed for annually on the king's or queen's birthday, and known as the Commemoration Prize.

=== The Royal Prize of 20 Guineas ===
Since 1677, there has also been a competition for The Royal Prize for which £20 is awarded on the condition that the winner contributes to the Company silver plate to the value of money received from the Crown. The condition is that the plate must bear the insignia of Archery.

=== The Silver Bugles ===
The ninth and tenth prizes are a pair of Silver Bugles, one presented to the Royal Company by one of the General Officers, Sir Henry Jardine, Knight, and which was shot for on 9 April 1830, for the first time. The second was presented later by the Sovereign's Bodyguard.

=== St. Andrew's Prize ===
St. Andrew's Cross, given in the 1840s by Sir George Steuart Mackenzie, of Coul, to the Royal Company, and called the "St.Andrew's Prize."

The above prizes were competed at the 180, 185 and 200 yards distances with two targets, or 'clouts,' as the aiming mark, one located at each end of the range. Two further prizes are competed for 'at butts' or point blank distance.

=== Prize of the Goose ===
The Prize of the Goose was competed for since 1703 and involved a live goose, requiring the winner to kill the goose when only its head protruded from the mark. The winner was to be known as the Captain of the Goose for a season. At some time in the history of the company the above method was adopted for shooting for the prize of the Goose by inserting a small glass globe of about an inch in diameter in the centre of the butt-mark, which is a circular piece of cardboard, four inches in diameter. The competitor whose arrow first breaks this globe is declared " Captain of the Goose " for the year, and was awarded the other gold medal presented by Major Spens.

=== The Gold Medal ===
This is the more often competed for prize, the competition being held three times a year for three days each time, the scoring accounted in points like the usual archery competition.

=== Competition rules ===
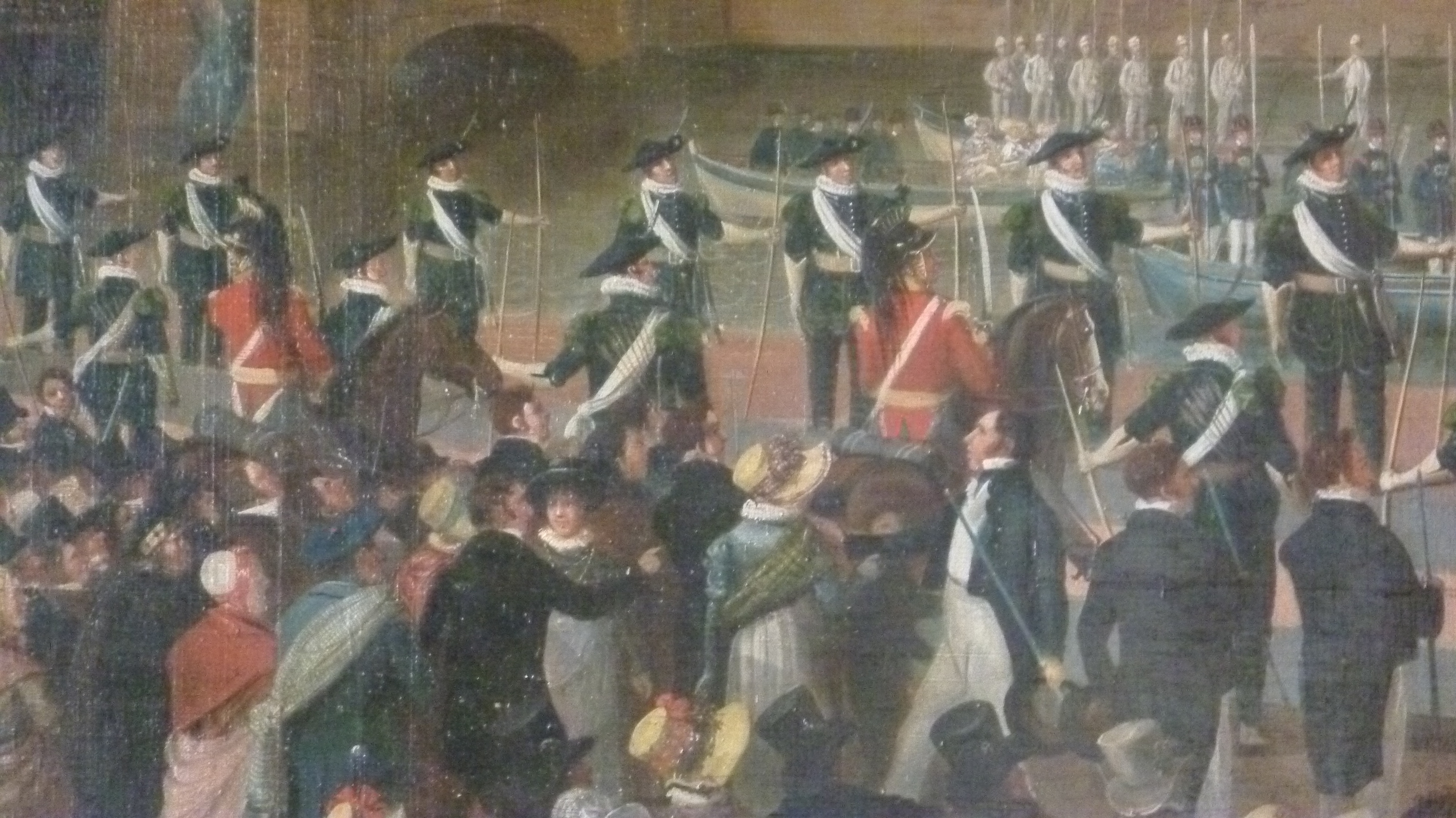
Members of the company on parade at the landing of King George IV at Leith in 1822. Detail from a painting by Alexander Carse

The rules and regulations of the Royal Company of Archers have never been printed, and, in fact, were never completed. The society may, therefore, be considered as "lawless" when within the precincts of their shooting ground.

== Duties ==
The main duties of the company are now ceremonial, and since the 1822 appointment as the Sovereign's 'Body Guard in Scotland' for George IV's visit to Edinburgh, include attending the Sovereign at various functions during the annual Royal Visit to Scotland when he or she approaches within five miles of Edinburgh, including the Order of the Thistle investitures at the High Kirk of Edinburgh (St Giles' Cathedral), the Royal Garden Party and the Ceremony of the Keys at the Palace of Holyroodhouse, and the presentation of new colours to Scottish regiments.

The Company arrives at the Palace of Holyroodhouse by march at noon, preceded by their pipes and drums band, and holding the unstrung bows in their right hands. Initially they occupy the colonnades of the façade.

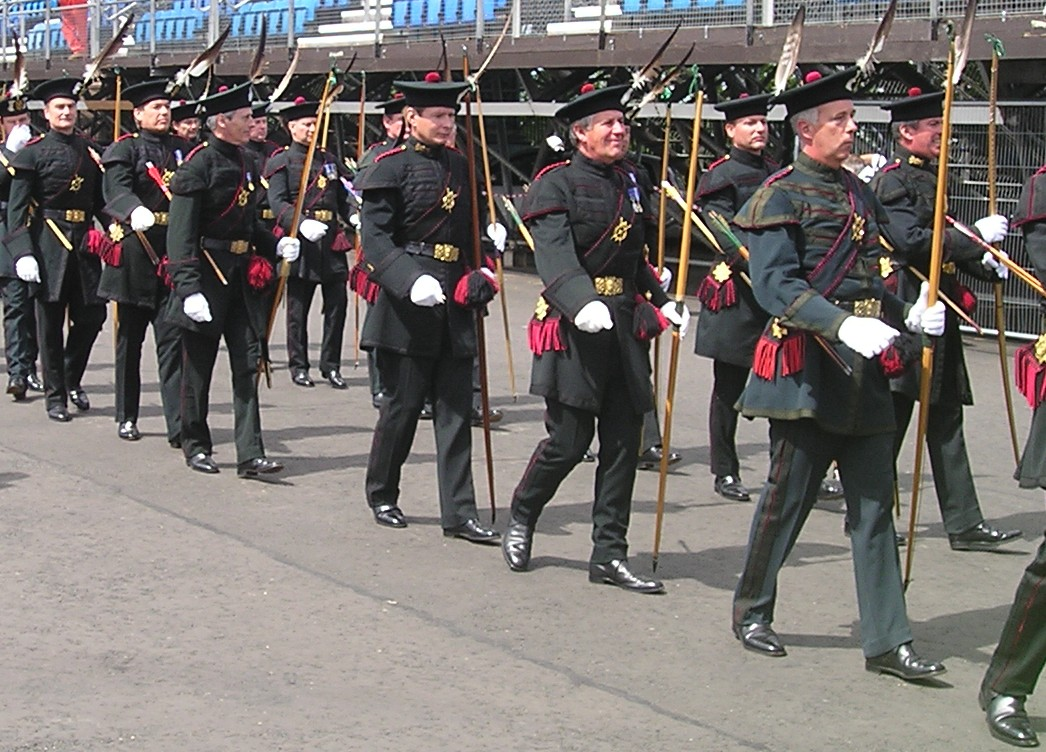
The Royal Company of Archers outside Edinburgh Castle

The company has a march, the Archer's March composed by Allan Ramsay, which was played on special occasions.

Sound, sound the music, sound it,
Let hills and dales rebound it,
Let hills and dales rebound it
In praise of Archery.
Used as a Game it pleases,
The mind to joy it raises,
And throws off all diseases
Of lazy luxury.

Now, now our care beguiling,
When all the year looks smiling,
When all the year looks smiling
With healthful harmony.
The sun in glory glowing,
With morning dew bestowing
Sweet fragrance, life, and growing
To flowers and every tree.

Tis now the archers royal,
An hearty band and loyal,
An hearty band and loyal,
That in just thought agree,
Appear in ancient bravery,
Despising all base knavery,
Which tends to bring in slavery,
Souls worthy to live free.

Sound, sound the music, sound it,
Fill up the glass and round wi't,
Fill up the glass and round wi't,
Health and Prosperity
To our great chief and officers,
To our president and counsellors,
To all who like their brave forbears
Delight in Archery.

== Organisation ==
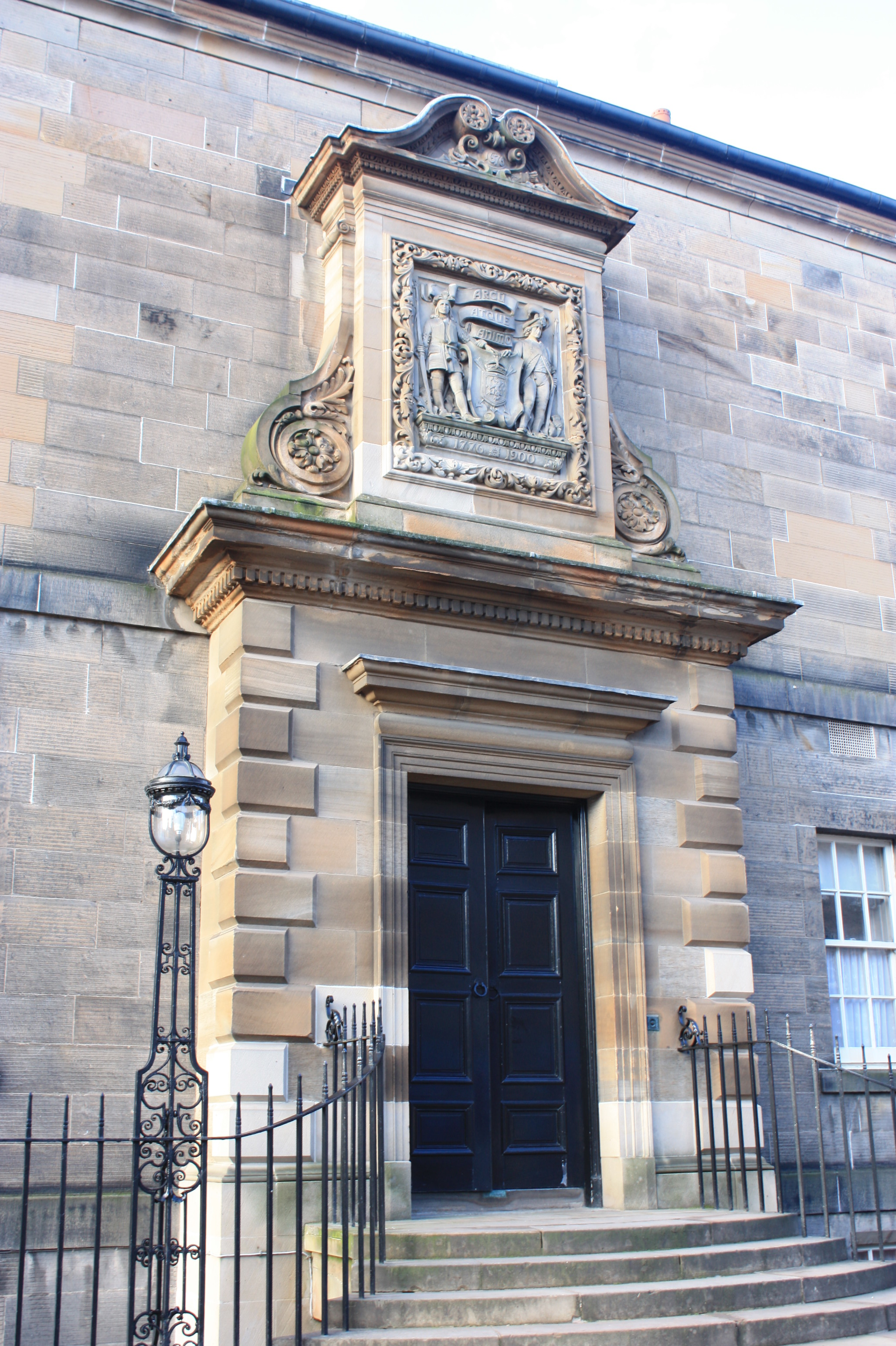
Entrance to Archer's Hall, Edinburgh, by Arthur Forman Balfour Paul (1875–1938)

The Royal Company of Archers has its base in Buccleuch Street, Edinburgh, at Archers' Hall. Building commenced on 15 August 1776, and was completed in 1777 by Alexander Laing (1752–1823). The Hall was extended in 1900 by Arthur Forman Balfour Paul (1875–1938), and recently refurbished. The Hall consists of a hall, 40 feet (12 metres) by 24 feet (7.3 metres), and 18 feet (5.5 metres) high; two rooms of 18 feet (5.5 metres) by 19 feet (5.8 metres), and kitchen, cellars, lobby, and other apartments. Until 2010, the ground behind the house was laid out into a bowling-green, known as The Meadows or Hope Park, a spot deriving its name from Sir Thomas Hope, who drained and converted it into an archery ground, maintained by the Edinburgh Bowling Club. The Hall serves as a venue for various dinners and meetings of the Royal Company.

The affairs of the Royal Company are managed by a President and six counsellors, who are chosen annually by the whole membership. The Adjutant, an officer, is the only ex-officio member of Council. The council is vested with the power of receiving or rejecting candidates for admission, and of appointing the company's officers, civil and military.

The structure of the organisation is divided between officers and Archers. By seniority, the officers comprise one Captain-General, four Captains, four Lieutenants, four Ensigns and twelve Brigadiers.

From the starting membership of fifty, the number of the corps numbered about 1,000 in the late 18th century, but only exceeded five hundred by the 1930s. The Captain-General is the Gold Stick for Scotland.

The Royal Company of Archers functions as the Sovereign's 'Body Guard in Scotland'. Every officer of The Royal Company is of the rank of a general, and the Archers of the corps rank at Court as colonels.

Members of the Royal Company must be Scots or have strong Scottish connections. Membership is by election; the present membership totals around 530, with an active list of some 400. Members pay an annual subscription, and are also expected to cover the cost of their uniforms and equipment, as well as of travel and other expenses incidental to their duties.

== Company standards ==
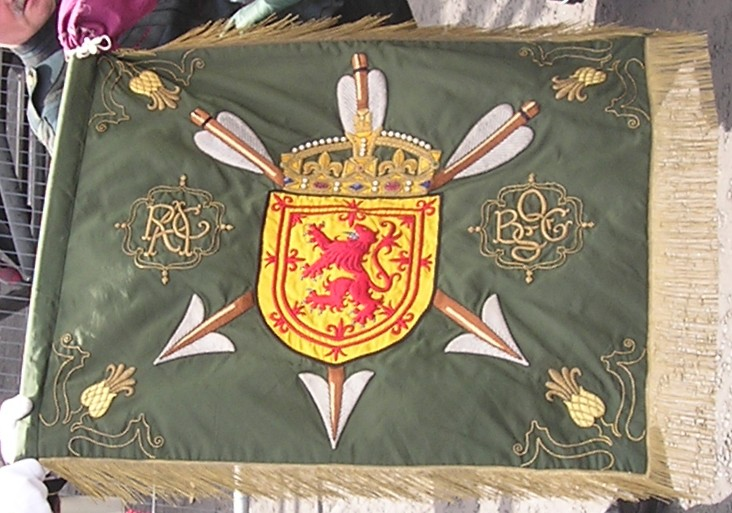
One of the current standards of the Royal Company of Archers

The Royal Company has two standards. The first of these bears on one side Mars and Cupid encircled in a wreath of thistles, with this motto: In peace and war. On the other, a yew tree, with two men dressed and equipped as archers, encircled as the former motto: Dat gloria vires (Glory Gives Strength). The other standard displays on one side, on a field or, a lion rampant gules, encircled with a double tressure flory-counter flory of the second (the Royal Arms of Scotland); on the top, a thistle and crown, motto: Nemo me impune lacessit (no one provokes me with impunity). On the other, St Andrew on the cross on field argent; at the top, a crown, motto: Dulce pro patria periculum (danger is sweet for one's country).

The three arrows on the standard were added after introduction of a third-place winner in the competition since 1720.

== Uniforms ==
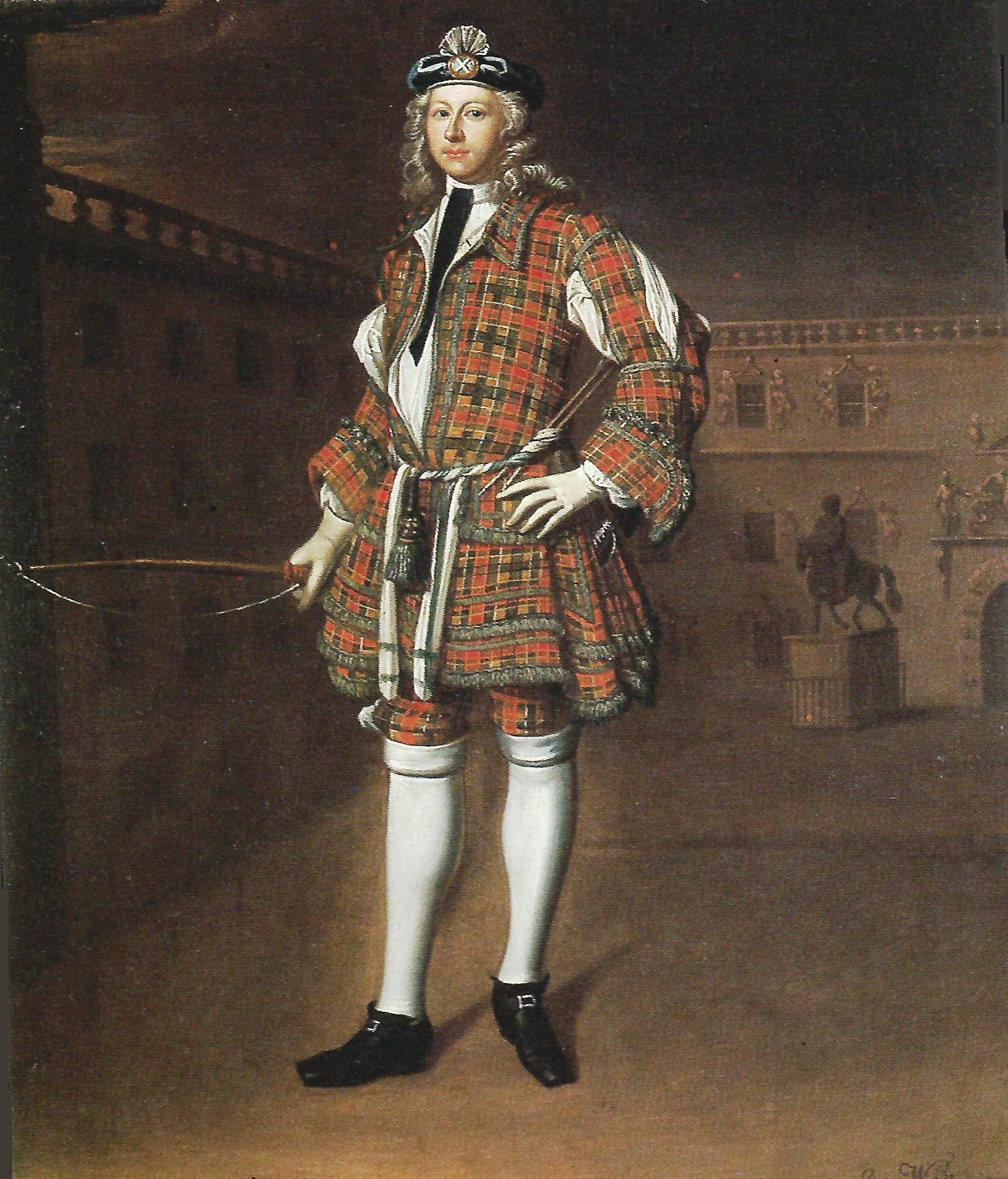
Original Royal Company of Archers uniform tunic and short trews as worn by Archibald Grant of Monymusk, painted 1715 by Richard Waitt

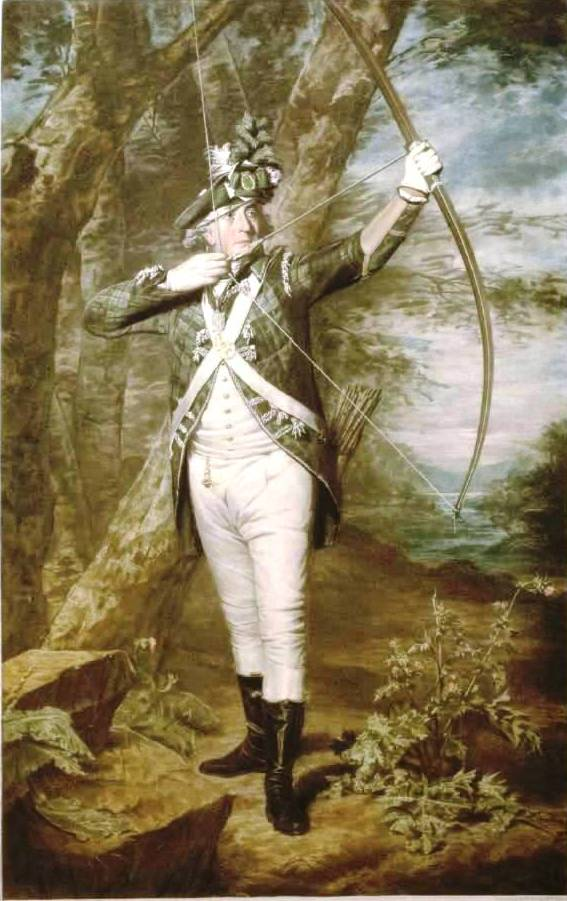
Dr Nathaniel Spens in 1793 Royal Company of Archers uniform

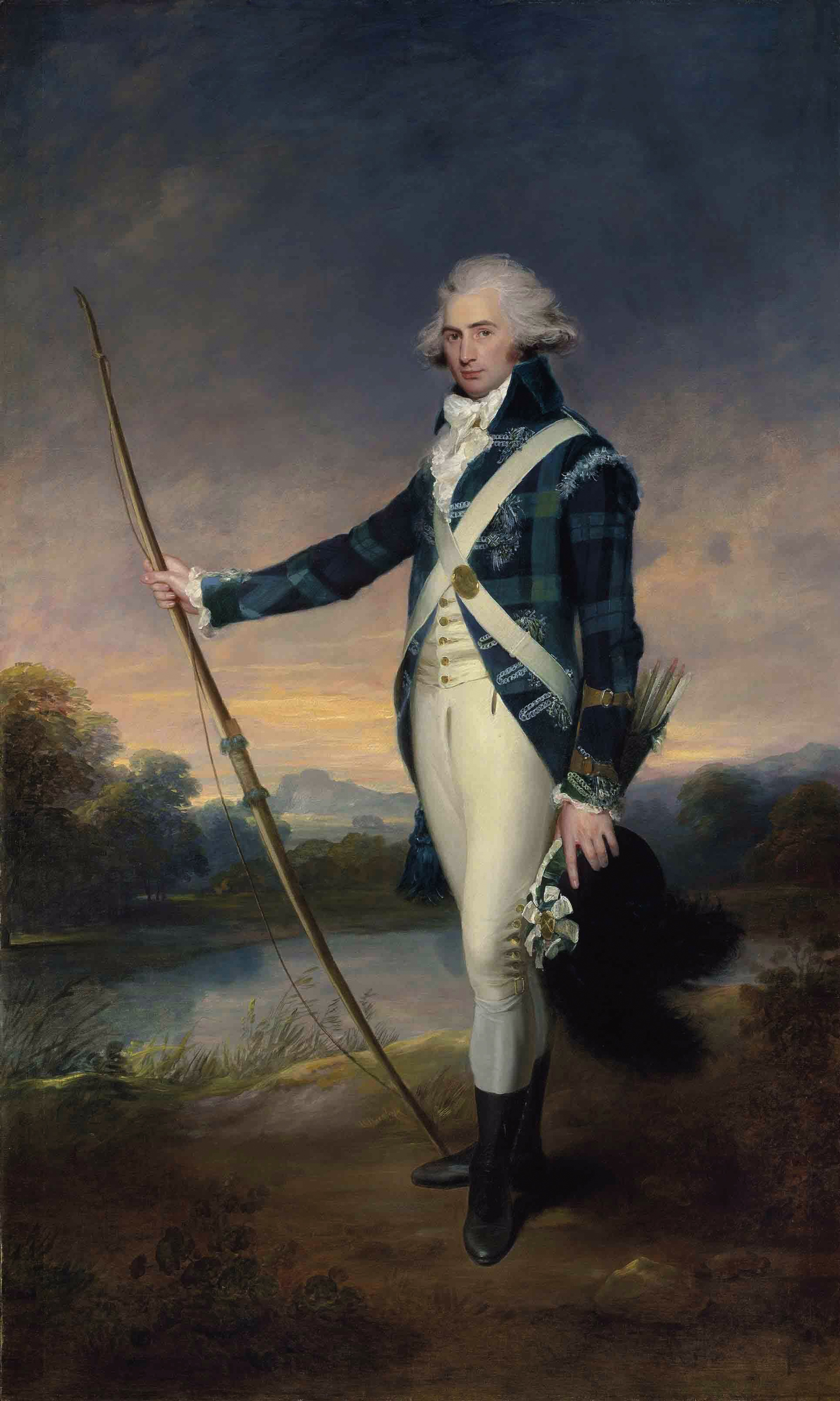
George Douglas, 16th Earl of Morton in the dress of the Royal Company of Archers at the turn of the 18th and 19th century, holding a longbow and a black-plumed white cockaded cap, in Holyrood Park, with Duddingston Loch and Edinburgh Castle beyond (William Beechey)

The Royal Company of Archers have the distinction of being the first unit in the service of the British Crown who adopted tartan as a part of their uniform.

The original uniform of the corps appears to have been a "shooting" dress, consisting of a tartan, lined with white, trimmed with green and white ribbons; a white sash, with green tassels; and a blue bonnet, with a St. Andrew's cross, a tartan coat, with knee-breeches and white vest; and a "common uniform", the coat of which was "a green lapelled frock." Tartan was fashionable at the time as an expression of anti-Union and pro-Jacobite sentiment and many of the company were known Jacobites.

From 1713 to 1746, a red tartan was used for shooting uniform's dress-like tunic, coat, and short trews. The tartan was thought lost for some time, but some of the tunics survive at Archers' Hall, and the sett of the quite complicated tartan has been analysed in detail (including variations). After 36 years following the Battle of Culloden the Act of Proscription passed by Parliament which "proscribed or banned the making or wearing of Tartan cloths" was repealed, and from 1783 tartans were worn again. However, in 1789 the red tartan sett was discarded for the Black Watch one. In 1734 the headgear worn by the corps was a flat bonnet, ornamented with green and white feathers. Until 1823 (and possibly later) the Royal Company of Archers still wore tartan.

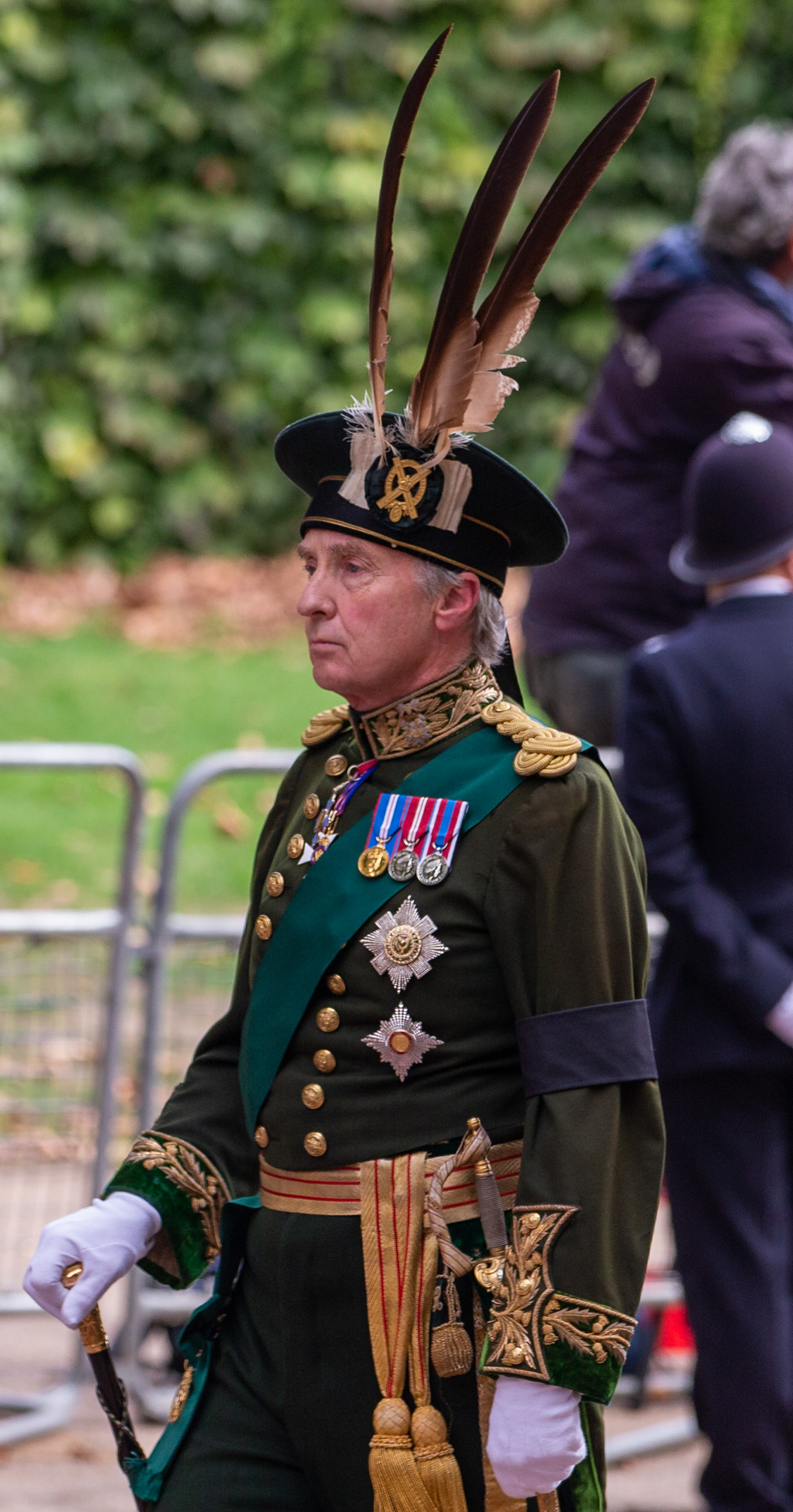
The Duke of Buccleuch as Captain General of the Royal Company of Archers

Late in the 19th century when the Queen Victoria opened the Glasgow Exhibition, Her Majesty's Scottish Body Guard wore their dark green tunics (formerly of the "Black Watch" tartan), with black braid facings and a narrow stripe of crimson velvet in the centre; shoulder wings and gauntleted cuffs similarly trimmed; dark green trousers with black and crimson stripe; a bow case worn as a sash, adorned with two arrows forming a St. Andrew's cross surmounted by a crown; a black leather waist-belt with richly chased gold clasp; a short, gilt-headed Roman sword, like an English bandsman's; Highland bonnet with thistle and one or more eagle feathers.

Their uniform until the Second World War, however, had been a court dress of green with gold embroidery and a cocked hat with a plume of dark cock's feathers. The officers' dress has gold embroidery, and their rank is indicated by two or, in the case of the captain, three, feathers being worn in the bonnet. The corps shooting dress is a dark-green tunic with crimson facings, shoulder-wings and gauntleted cuffs and dark-green trousers trimmed with black and crimson, a bow-case worn as a sash, of the same colour as the coat, black waistbelt with sword, Highland cap with thistle ornament and one or more eagle feathers, and a hunting knife. The weapon worn with this uniform is the sword.

== Captains-general ==
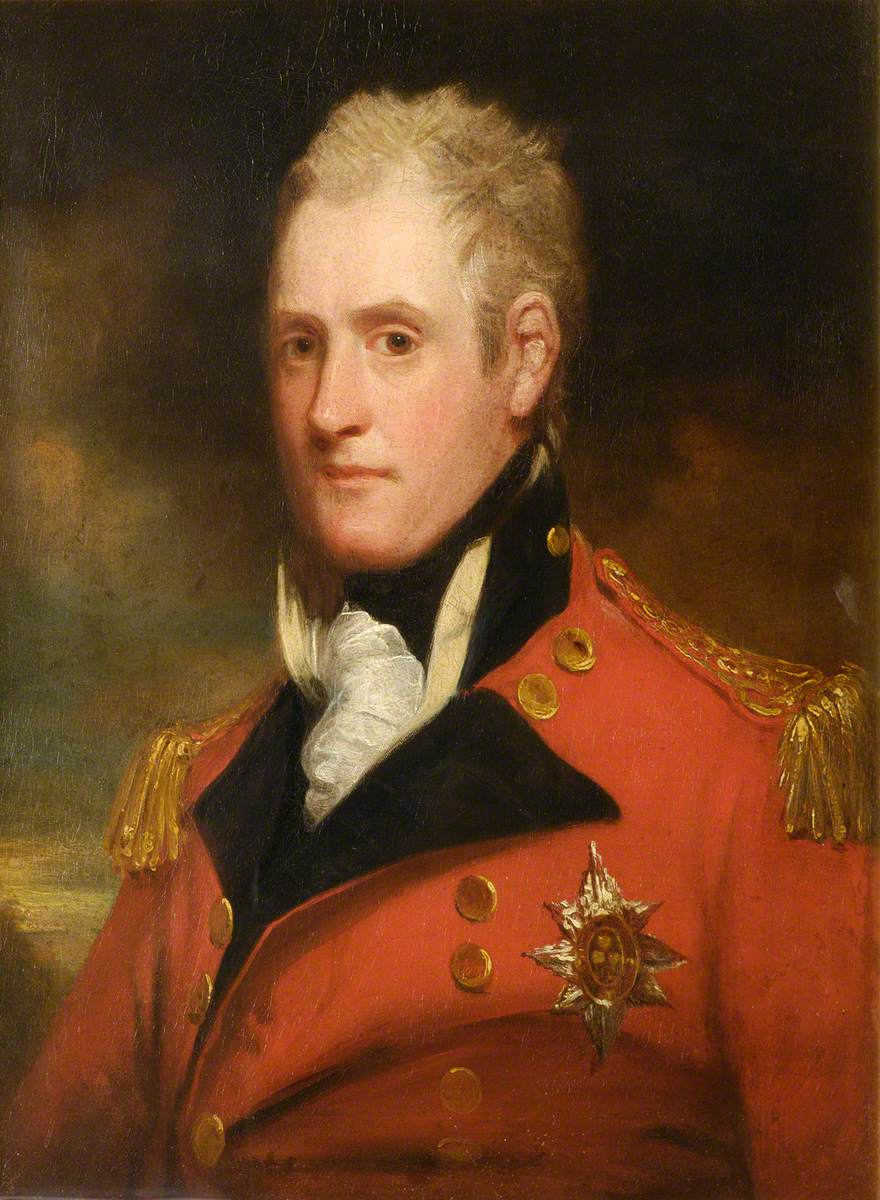
An able officer and veteran of the Napoleonic wars, John Hope, 4th Earl of Hopetoun reinvigorated the Royal Company of Archers and helped to steer it towards the role it occupies now since the 1822 visit by King George IV to Edinburgh.

- John Murray, 1st Marquess of Atholl c.1676–1703
- George Mackenzie, 1st Earl of Cromartie 1703–1714
- David Wemyss, 4th Earl of Wemyss 1715–1720
- vacant
- James Hamilton, 5th Duke of Hamilton 1724–1743
- James Wemyss, 5th Earl of Wemyss 1743–1756
- Charles Douglas, 3rd Duke of Queensberry 1756–1778
- Henry Scott, 3rd Duke of Buccleuch 1778–1812
- Charles Montagu-Scott, 4th Duke of Buccleuch 1812–1819
- John Hope, 4th Earl of Hopetoun 1819–1823
- James Graham, 3rd Duke of Montrose 1824–1830
- George Ramsay, 9th Earl of Dalhousie 1830–1838
- Walter Montagu-Douglas-Scott, 5th Duke of Buccleuch 1838–1884
- William Montagu-Douglas-Scott, 6th Duke of Buccleuch 1884–1914
- John Montagu-Douglas-Scott, 7th Duke of Buccleuch 1914–1935
- Sidney Buller-Fullerton-Elphinstone, 16th Lord Elphinstone 1935–1953
- John Dalrymple, 12th Earl of Stair 1953–1961
- Walter Montagu-Douglas-Scott, 8th Duke of Buccleuch 1961–1973
- John Dalrymple, 13th Earl of Stair 1973–1988
- Ronald Colville, 2nd Baron Clydesmuir 1988–1996
- Sir Hew Fleetwood Hamilton-Dalrymple, 10th Baronet 1996–2004
- David Ogilvy, 13th Earl of Airlie 2004–2006
- James Graham, 8th Duke of Montrose 2006–2014
- Richard Walter John Montagu Douglas Scott, 10th Duke of Buccleuch, 12th Duke of Queensberry 2014–present

== Notable members ==
Over the years, the Company members have included soldiers, scientists, lawyers and politicians:

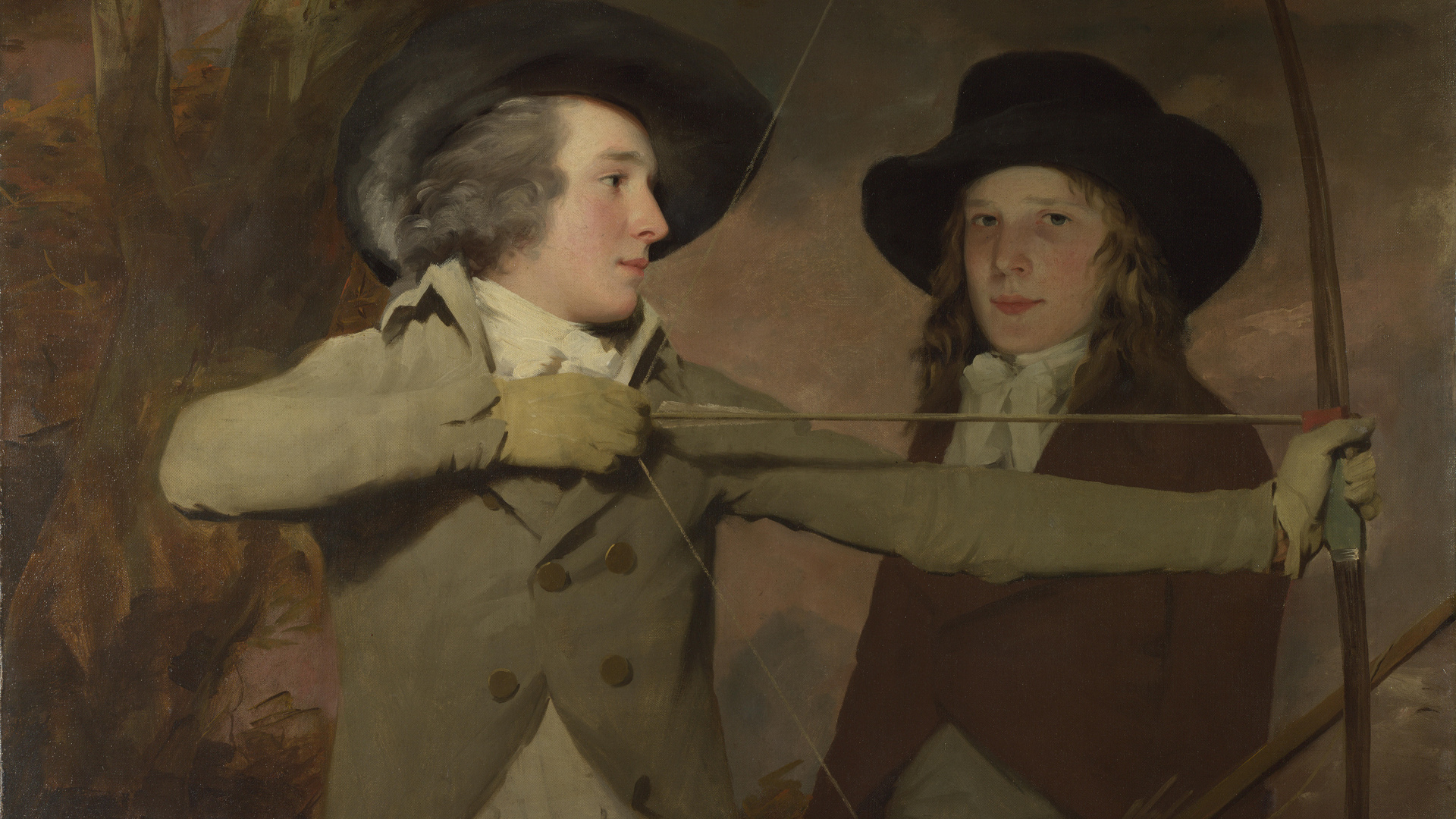
Robert and Ronald Ferguson as painted by Sir Henry Raeburn in "The Archers"

- Sir James Pringle, 4th Baronet, (1726–1809) soldier and Member of Parliament. He was President of Council 1783 to 1809.
- Robert Ferguson of Raith (1770–1840) and his brother Lt-Gen. Sir Ronald Craufurd Ferguson (1773–1841) – subjects of the painting "The Archers" (1789 or 1790), by Sir Henry Raeburn (1756–1823). (Collection: National Gallery)
- Sir Walter Scott (1771–1832)
- Sir Henry Raeburn (1756–1823)
- Robert Burns (1759–1796)
- John Rattray (1707–1771), surgeon and golfer
- Sir Patrick Ford, 1st Baronet 1877–1945
- James Duff, Edinburgh, Author: Bows and Arrows, 1927, Jersey City, New Jersey bowmaker and fletcher
- Sir Tony Keswick (1903–1990), managing director of Jardine, Matheson & Co., governor of the Hudson's Bay Company and a director of the Bank of England
- Sir Maxwell Inglis, 9th Baronet (1903–1974), Lord-Lieutenant of Midlothian
- Brig Patrick Sholto Douglas (1912–1977)
- Dr Paul MacKenzie (1919–2014)
- Lt-Col Malcolm Robert Wallace of that Ilk (1921–1990)
- Donald Erskine of Cardross and Carnock (1925–2017)
- James Charles Macnab, The Macnab (1926–2013)
- Charles Jauncey, Baron Jauncey of Tullichettle (1925–2007), a British Law Lord
- Sir Angus Ogilvy (1928–2004), husband of Princess Alexandra of Kent
- Aidan Cuthbert (1934–), of Beaufront Castle and former husband of Lady Lucy Percy
- Robin Orr Blair (1940–), late Lyon King of Arms
- Sir Lachlan Maclean, 12th Baronet (1942–), 28th Chief of Clan Maclean
- Sir Crispin Agnrey of Lochnaw, Baronet (1944–), explorer and herald of arms
- Mark Agnew of Lochnaw (1991–), adventurer and European Adventurer of the Year 2023
- Sir Malcolm Leslie Rifkind (1946–), former Secretary of State for Scotland
- Merlin Hay, 24th Earl of Erroll (1948–), Chief of Clan Hay, hereditary Lord High Constable of Scotland and a crossbench member of the House of Lords
- Lt-Gen Sir Alastair Irwin (1948–), Adjutant General
- Professor Sir Hew Strachan (1949–)
- Maj-Gen Alastair Bruce of Crionaich (1960–), Governor of Edinburgh Castle
- Alister Jack, Baron Jack of Courance (1963–), former Secretary of State for Scotland
- Sir Ben Wallace (1970–), former Secretary of State for Defence

== Significance ==
The Royal Company forms a part of the King's Household in Scotland.

Archers' Hall is a Category B listed building, i.e. "buildings of regional or more than local importance, or major examples of some particular period, style or building type which may have been altered" in compliance with Scotland's Town and Country Planning (Listed Buildings and Conservation Areas) (Scotland) Act 1997.

== See also ==
- Woodmen of Arden
- High Constables and Guard of Honour of the Palace of Holyroodhouse
- Guard and archers of Mary, Queen of Scots
