= Sovereign's Bodyguard =

UK ceremonial units

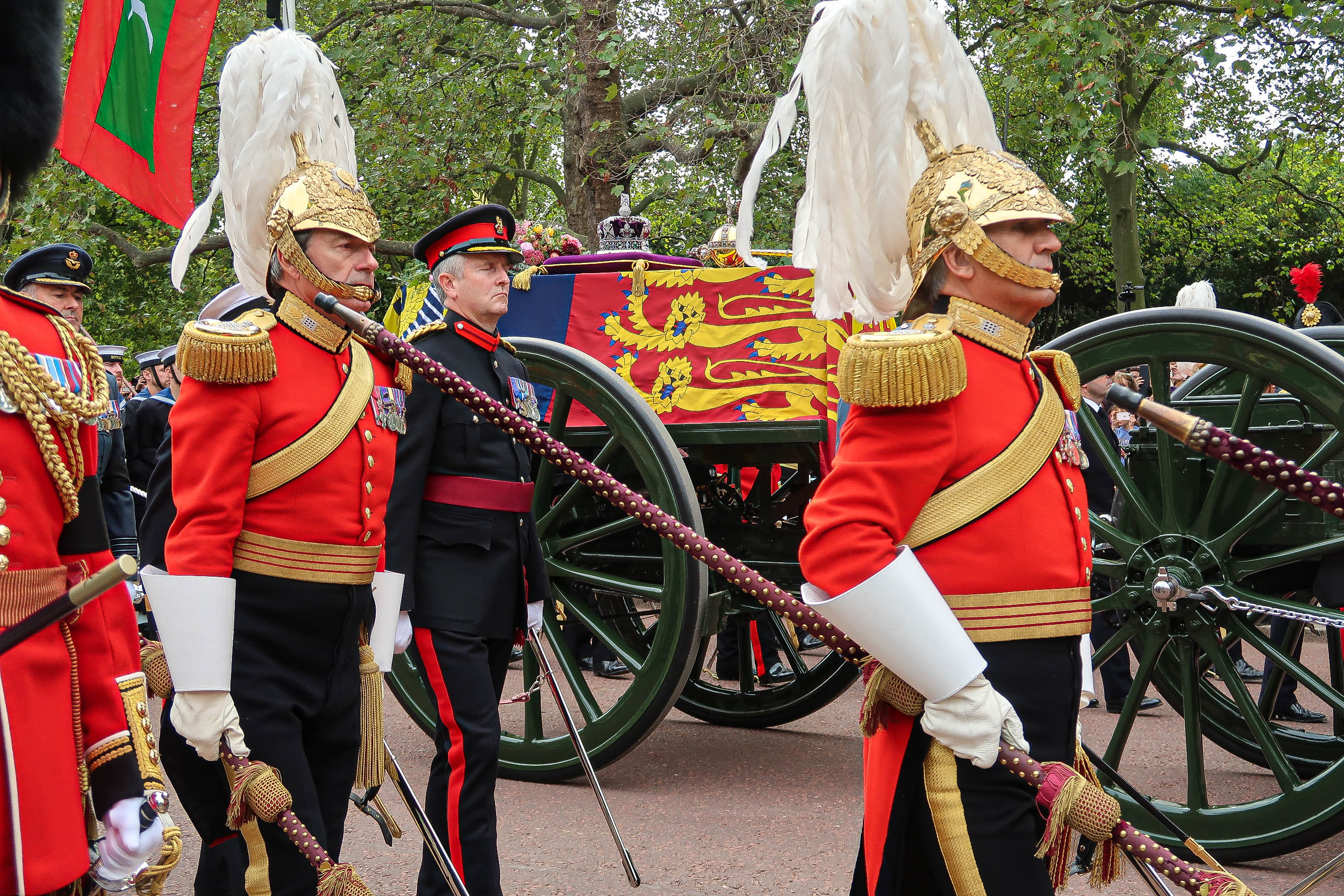
Gentlemen at Arms

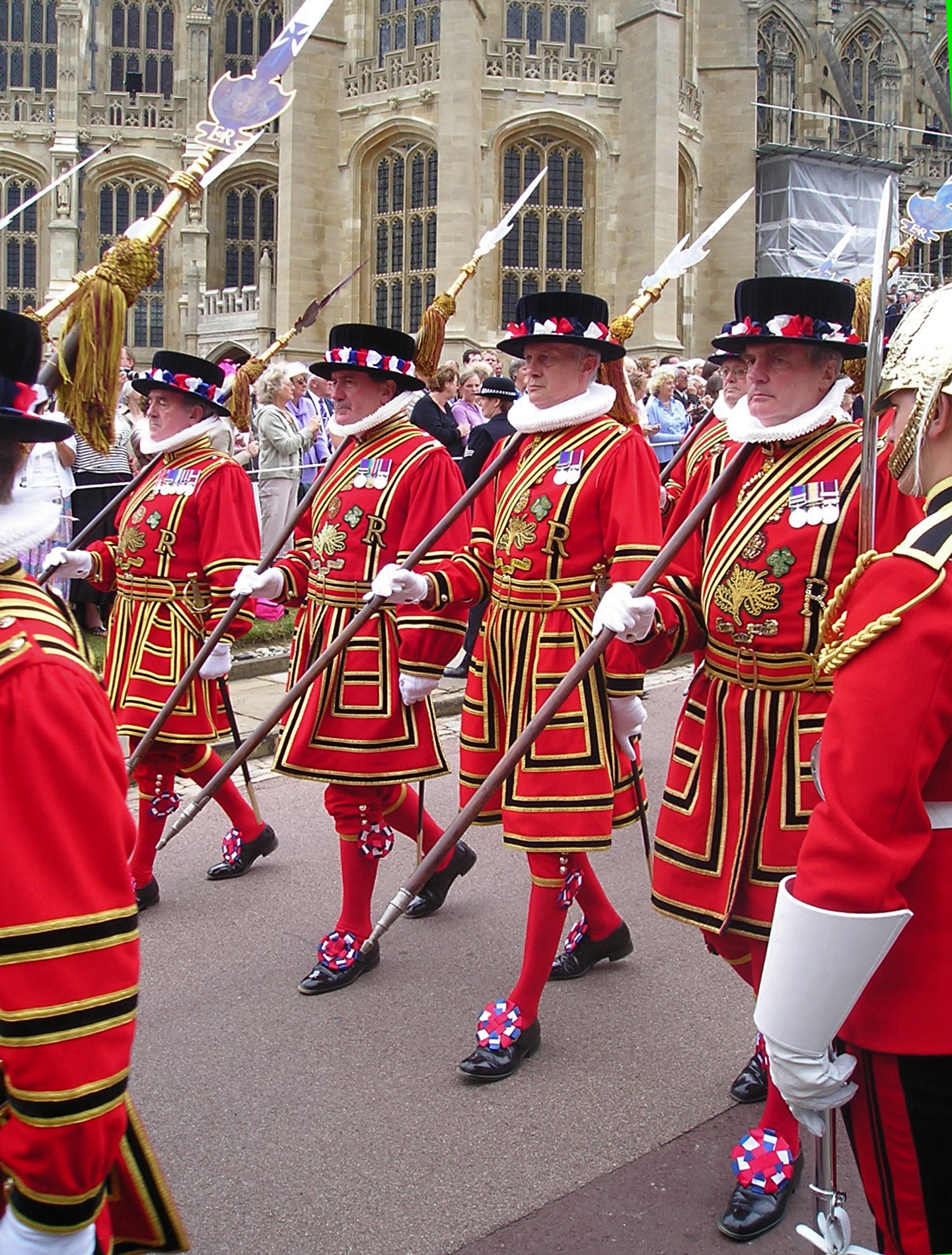
Yeomen of the Guard

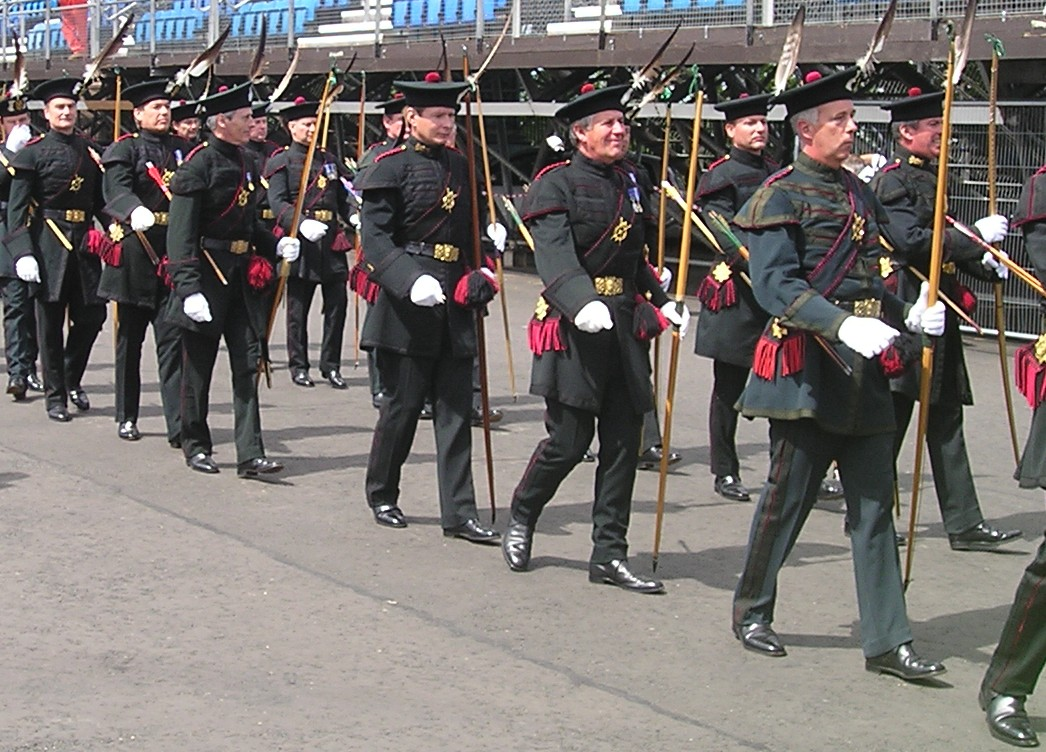
Royal Company of Archers

Sovereign's Bodyguard is the name given to three ceremonial units in the United Kingdom who are tasked with guarding the Sovereign. These units are:

- His Majesty's Body Guard of the Honourable Corps of Gentlemen at Arms – formed 1509
- King's Body Guard of the Yeomen of the Guard – formed 1485
- Royal Company of Archers, the King's Body Guard for Scotland – formed 1676; entered royal service 1822

Although the Yeomen of the Guard is older, the Gentlemen at Arms are more senior, due to their being classed as 'gentlemen' rather than 'yeomen', and because they are classed as the 'nearest guard', i.e. the personal guard to the Sovereign. The Royal Company of Archers has responsibility for guarding the sovereign while they are in Scotland.

== Other Royal Bodyguards ==
- Yeomen Warders were originally a detachment of the Yeoman of the Guard, appointed by Henry VIII to guard the Royal Palace of the Tower of London in 1509
- High Constables and Guard of Honour of the Palace of Holyroodhouse created in the early sixteenth century to guard the Palace and Abbey of Holyroodhouse, and enforce law and order within the precincts of the Palace and the Holyrood Abbey Sanctuary.
- Doorward Guard of Partizans are the personal bodyguard of the King in Scotland serving under the Lord High Constable of Scotland. They are claimed to be the oldest bodyguard in Britain.

== Former Royal Bodyguards ==
- Guard and archers of Mary, Queen of Scots, Scottish bodyguard formed in 1562.

== See also ==
- Protection Command
- Gold Stick and Silver Stick
- Household Division
- King's Guard
