= Honourable Corps of Gentlemen at Arms =

Bodyguard of the British monarch

His Majesty's Body Guard of the Honourable Corps of Gentlemen at Arms
- Badge of the Gentlemen-at-Arms
- Active: 1509-
- Country: England
- Type: Dismounted bodyguard
- Role: Royal Body Guard
- Size: One Troop
- Part of: Sovereign's Body Guard
- Garrison/HQ: London
- March: The Nearest Guard
- Engagements: Guinegate, Boulogne

Commanders
- Colonel in Chief: Charles III
- Captain: Roy Kennedy, Baron Kennedy of Southwark; Chief Whip in the House of Lords

Insignia
- Collar badge: Portcullis
- Plume: White

His Majesty's Body Guard of the Honourable Corps of Gentlemen at Arms is a bodyguard to the British Monarch. Until 17 March 1834, they were known as The Honourable Band of Gentlemen Pensioners.

== Formation ==
The corps was formed as the Troop of Gentlemen in 1509 by King Henry VIII to act as a mounted escort, armed with spear and lance to protect the sovereign, in battle or elsewhere. Henry decided to have "this new and sumptuous Troop of Gentlemen composed of cadets of noble families and the highest order of gentry as his personal Body Guard or 'Nearest Guard'", cadets being the younger sons of nobles.

As his bodyguard, it accompanied Henry to France in 1513 and took part in the Battle of Guinegate (1513) (better known as the Battle of the Spurs) and then at the Field of the Cloth of Gold in 1520. In 1526, they became a dismounted bodyguard armed with battleaxes. They last saw service in battle during the English Civil War, during which a Gentleman Matthews saved the Prince of Wales at the Battle of Edgehill (1642) from one of the Earl of Essex's troopers. They were always intended as a primarily ceremonial unit, but were on regular duty until the 19th century.

Under Henry VIII, the Troop of Gentlemen varied in size, according to funding available. As the "Nearest Guard" to the Monarch, the unit attracted an aristocratic and aspiring membership, which could be utilised as a cadre of young officers when levies were raised for overseas service.

== Duties ==
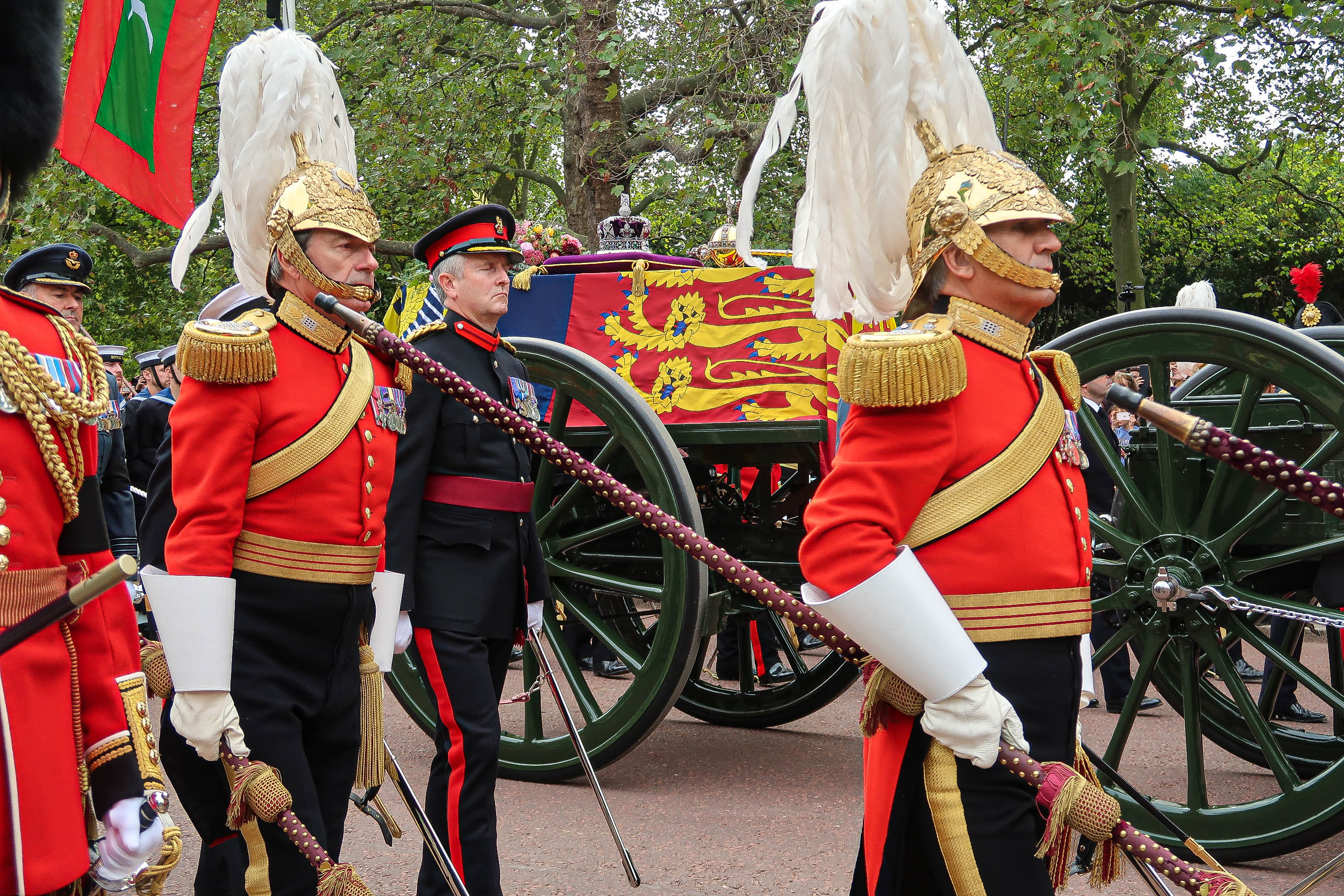
Gentlemen at Arms marching alongside the coffin of Queen Elizabeth II, as part of the procession following her funeral.

Today, the duties are purely ceremonial: the Gentlemen accompany and attend the sovereign at various events and occasions, including state visits by heads of state, the opening of parliament, and ceremonies involving the various orders of chivalry, including the Order of the Garter. The Gentlemen now parade for the State Opening of Parliament, state visits, royal garden parties, the Garter service, receptions of the diplomatic corps, royal weddings, coronations, the Investiture of the Prince of Wales, lyings in state and State Funerals. They also have three mess dinners annually.

== Officers and administration ==
The Corps today consists of five Officers (the Captain, the Lieutenant, the Standard Bearer, the Clerk of the Cheque and Adjutant and the Harbinger) and 24 Gentlemen. The senior Officer is the Captain, a political appointee who is now always the Government Chief Whip in the House of Lords. The senior permanent officer is the Lieutenant. The Clerk of the Cheque and Adjutant issues all orders to the Corps. The Harbinger runs the Mess and assists the Clerk. The Mess, at St. James's Palace, is run by a permanent Axe Keeper and Butler. All Officers (except the Captain) must have served in the Corps prior to promotion to officer rank. In the 17th century, there was also the office of Paymaster of the Honourable Corps of Gentlemen at Arms and Co-Paymaster of the Honourable Corps of Gentlemen at Arms.

== Membership and age limits ==
All subordinate officers, and all Gentlemen, must be under the age of 55 years on joining, and are on average 52. The Gentlemen retain their prior military ranks (currently most rank between major and colonel). They must retire at 70 years.

Although all Gentlemen are retired officers, uniquely one recent member is also a clergyman. Colonel the Reverend Richard ("Dick") H. Whittington joined the Corps in 1999 after retiring from the Corps of Royal Engineers. He was ordained a deacon in 1993 and a priest in 1994. He was Chaplain of the Royal Hospital Chelsea from 2001 to 2013.

Another notable Gentleman was Major Walter Clopton Wingfield, one of the pioneers of lawn tennis, who served from 1870 to 1909.

== Uniform ==
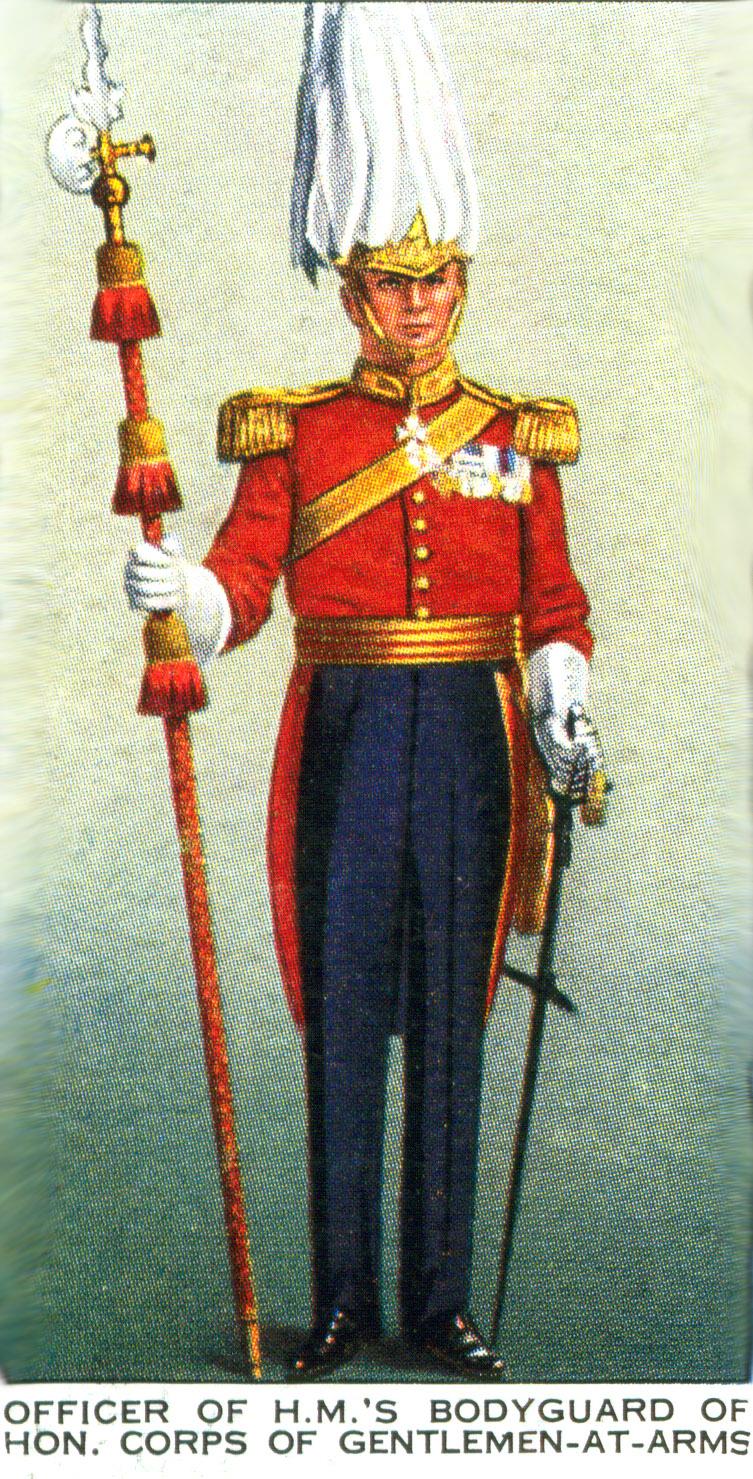
The uniform of the Gentlemen at Arms, depicted on a cigarette card produced for the Coronation of King George VI and Queen Elizabeth in 1937.

The uniform is that of a Dragoon Guards officer of the 1840s. It has a skirted red coatee with Garter blue velvet cuffs and facings embroidered with the Tudor royal badge of the portcullis. Helmets with white swan feather plumes are worn when on duty, even in church. Officers wear, in addition, gold aiguillettes, and carry sticks of office—gold for the Captain, silver for the Lieutenant, Standard Bearer and Clerk of the Cheque, and ivory for the Harbinger—which they receive from the Sovereign on appointment. Cavalry swords are worn, and long ceremonial battle-axes, over 300 years old, are carried by all the Gentlemen.

The uniforms are produced by the royal warrant holder Gieves & Hawkes from Savile Row in London, with the helmets handcrafted and maintained by the royal warrant holder Thomas Lyte at their goldsmithing and silversmithing workshops, also in London.

== Standard ==
The corps carries a standard, similar to that carried by cavalry and infantry regiments of the British Army, upon which is mounted the corps' various accoutrements and a selection of its battle honours. In the case of the Gentlemen at Arms, this is a swallowtailed standard of crimson edged in gold. The cross of St George is at the hoist. Next to this is the Royal Cipher of the reigning monarch, with the name of the corps ("Gentlemen at Arms") put diagonally from top to bottom. Between the two pieces of text is the corps' portcullis badge, while at the end of the standard are a selection of battle honours. In 2009, at a celebration of the Corps' 500 years of personal service to the Sovereign, Queen Elizabeth II presented a special riband to be displayed on the Standard.

== Battle honours ==
- 1513 **Guinegate**
- 1520 Field of Cloth of Gold
- 1544 **Siege of Boulogne**

Honours in bold are displayed on the corps' standard.

== See also ==
- Rynda
- Spatharios
