= Kintyre Pursuivant =

- The heraldic badge of Kintyre Pursuivant of Arms
- Heraldic tradition: Gallo-British
- Jurisdiction: Scotland
- Governing body: Court of the Lord Lyon

Kintyre Pursuivant of Arms is a Scottish pursuivant of arms of the Court of the Lord Lyon.

The Kintyre Pursuivant was formerly a private officer of arms in the service of the Lord of the Isles, but along with Dingwall Pursuivant, Ross Herald, and Islay Herald became an officer of arms to the Scottish Crown when the last Lord of the Isles forfeited his estates and titles to James IV of Scotland in 1493.

The badge of office is Two dolphins hauriant addorsed Azure enfiled of a coronet of four fleurs-de-lys (two visible) and four crosses pattee (one and two halves visible) Or.

John Charles Grossmith George held the office of Kintyre Pursuivant from 1986 to 2000, before his retirement and subsequent appointment as Linlithgow Pursuivant Extraordinary. Thereafter it remained vacant until 1 October 2025, when Susan Flintoff VR was appointed.

== Holders of the office ==
Arms	Name	Date of appointment	Ref
	Adam Loutfoot	1494	
	Sir John Pettigrew	1536	
	John Forsyth	1548	
	Patrick Davidson	1557	
	James Purdie of Kinaldies	1569	
	William Rankeillour	1595	
	Walter Ritchie	1616	
	John Ritchie	1632	
	William Stewart	1633	
	George Stewart	1641	
	George Gordon	1661	
	John Dale (or Daill)	1668	
	Alexander Barbour	1684	
	John Skene	1706	
	Sir John Erskine of Cambo, Baronet	1707	
	Alexander Green	1714	
	John Masson	1715	
	James Clarkson	1724	
	Thomas Nicolson	1761	
	James Geddes	1785	
	Robert Hamilton	1821	
	William Robert Montignani	1859	
	John Jeffers Wilson	1860	
	Hugh Gray Tibbetts	1866	
	Vacant	1869–1953	
	Iain Moncreiffe of that Ilk	1953–1955	
	Charles Jauncey, Baron Jauncey of Tullichettle	1955–1971	
	Vacant	1971–1986	
	John Charles Grossmith George	1986–2000	
	Vacant	2000–2025	
	Susan Flintoff	2025 - Present	

== See also ==
- Officer of Arms
- Pursuivant
- Court of the Lord Lyon
- Heraldry Society of Scotland
