= Lyon Clerk and Keeper of the Records =

- The arms of office of the Lyon Clerk
- Heraldic tradition: Gallo-British
- Jurisdiction: Scotland
- Governing body: Court of the Lord Lyon
- Chief officer: Russell Hunter Esq., Lyon Clerk

Lyon Clerk and Keeper of the Records is a legal and heraldic office in Scotland. The holder of this office is appointed by the Crown, and like the Lord Lyon King of Arms receives an annual salary. Lyon Clerk's duties include heraldic research, the preparation of papers, lectures and conducting and assisting with the preliminary business of application for a grant or matriculation of armorial bearings. This includes scrutiny of documents supporting the application. As Keeper of the Records the duties include maintaining the records of the Court of the Lord Lyon, overseeing the preparation of documents, allowing inspection of the Public Register of All Arms and Bearings in Scotland and other records, and issuing certified extracts when required. Until 1867 there was a Lyon Clerk Depute, and in 1986 Elizabeth Ann Roads became the first woman appointed to the office of Lyon Clerk and Keeper of the Records.

== Role ==
Badge of the office of the Lyon Clerk was approved in 2010. The badge depicts: "On a mount strewn with thistles vert, a lion sejant affrontée gules supporting in each paw a feather Or quilled gules".

In 1669 the Parliament of Scotland passed the Lyon King of Arms Act 1669, the act confirmed the privileges and emoluments of the: '"Lyon King at Armes and his breethren heraulds and pursevants their Clerk of Court and thair successors". The Lyon King of Arms Act 1672 mentioned the 'Lyon Clerk' as one of the recipients of all documents, on behalf of the Lord Lyon King of Arms.

The Lyon Clerk, together with the Lord Lyon King of Arms, the Procurator fiscal, the Herald painter and the Macer of the Court constitutes the Court of the Lord Lyon. The Lyon Court is a part of the Scottish judiciary and deals with the subject of heraldry and genealogy in Scotland. The Lyon Clerk assists the Lord Lyon in both his ministerial and judicial work. The Lyon Clerk is appointed by the Crown through the Royal sign-manual, the appointment is then published in the Edinburgh Gazette. The Lyon Clerk's salary is paid for by the Crown. This has been the case since the Lyon King of Arms Act 1867, when the whole of the Lyon Court and Her Majesty's Officers of Arms were formally made into civil servants. Prior to this reform the Lyon Clerk received fees for every grant and matriculation. In 1837 the Lyon Clerk is paid £19 6s. for a grant of arms with supporters and £15 15s. without, for a matriculation £4 10s. 6d with supporters and £2 17s. without.

The Lyon Clerks have a prominent role in the operations of the Lyon Court. Every submission of application for a grant of arms, a matriculation of arms or the recording of genealogy must be made through the Lyon Clerk. This submission must be done either personally, by an intermediary agent or by correspondence, the Lyon Clerk is required to personally interview and reply to each applicant. As such the Lyon Clerk must take receipt of all documents and evidence submitted by the applicant in each case. Finally after the grant or matriculation has been made the Lyon Clerk must ensure that the resulting patent of arms is properly illuminated and emblazoned for the applicant and for the Lyon Court's register.

As Keeper of the Records, the Lyon Clerk is responsible for the maintenance of the Public Register of All Arms and Bearings in Scotland. This is done through the regular addition of new grants and matriculations. The Lyon Clerk must ensure that members of the public have access to the register by facilitating searches and studies of the records.

== Lyon Clerks and Keepers of the Records ==
Arms	Name	Date of appointment	Notes	Ref.
	Adam or Alexander MacCulloch	(1554)	Marchmont	
	James Purdie of Kinaldies	(1584)	Islay	
	John Purdy	4 January 1587	Ross	
	James Borthwick, WS	(1594)	Rothesay	
	James Winram	(1607)		
	Robert Winram	1625		
	George Watson, WS	1625		
	Thomas Drysdale	1632	Islay	
	William Weir	1660		
	Robert Smith of Gibleston	8 August 1663		
	Harry Maule, WS	1709		
	Charles Erskine	4 June 1715	Bute	
	David Erskine	6 June 1724	Rothesay	
	Thomas Brodie, WS	8 December 1769	Lyon Depute	
	Robert Boswell of St. Boswells, WS	2 November 1770		
	James Home of Linhouse, WS	4 May 1804	Lyon Depute	
	David Clyne, SSC	3 February 1819		
	Edward William Auriol Drummond Hay	1 April 1823		
	Alexander Macdonald	5 May 1845	(Ad interim)	
	James Lorimer of Kellyfield	7 November 1848	(Ad interim)	
	James Lorimer of Kellyfield	3 May 1864	(For life)	
	James William Mitchell	6 March 1890	Rothesay	(Note: '"`UNIQ--templatestyles-00000010-QINU`"'"No. 26030". The London Gazette. 7 March 1890. p. 1268.)
	Francis James Grant, WS	3 September 1898	Rothesay	(Note: '"`UNIQ--templatestyles-00000012-QINU`"'"No. 27012". The London Gazette. 7 October 1898. p. 5863.)
	Harold Andrew Balvaird Lawson, CVO	4 September 1929	Rothesay	(Note: '"`UNIQ--templatestyles-00000014-QINU`"'"No. 33534". The London Gazette. 13 September 1929. p. 5904.)
	Malcolm Innes of Edingight, CVO, WS	4 August 1966	Carrick; Marchmont	(Note: '"`UNIQ--templatestyles-00000016-QINU`"'"No. 18483". The Edinburgh Gazette. 12 August 1966. p. 630.)
	John Inglis Drever "Don" Pottinger, LVO	9 July 1981	Islay	(Note: '"`UNIQ--templatestyles-00000018-QINU`"'"No. 20951". The Edinburgh Gazette. 31 July 1981. p. 1023.)
	Elizabeth Ann Roads, LVO	5 February 1986	Linlithgow; Carrick; Snawdoun	(Note: '"`UNIQ--templatestyles-0000001A-QINU`"'"No. 21892". The Edinburgh Gazette. 21 February 1986. p. 247.)
	Russell Hunter Esq.	25 June 2018		(Note: '"`UNIQ--templatestyles-0000001F-QINU`"'Lyon Court [@Lyoncourt] (25 Jun 2018). "Her Majesty the Queen has appointed Mr Russell Hunter to be Lyon Clerk and Keeper of the Records. He was admitted as a solicitor in 1997 and has degrees in history and law from the Universities of Glasgow and Edinburgh, respectively. He will take up office during July" (Tweet) – via Twitter.)

== Lyon Clerks Depute ==
Name	Date of appointment	Notes
Robert Innes, WS	(1675)	
James Dallas	1715	
David Erskine	1718	Rothesay
No depute	1724–1751	
William Richardson	6 May 1751	
Robert Donaldson	1755 April 17	Marchmont
William Walker	29 July 1769	Marchmont
James Cumyng	7 November 1770	Herald painter
Robert Ranken	7 November 1773	
William Boswell	24 December 1794	
Alexander Liston Ramage	7 September 1796	
John Blair	12 January 1799	
Alexander Boswell	23 January 1801	
Thomas Small	2 May 1804	Marchmont
John Edward Touch	20 June 1807	
David Clyne (joint)	25 August 1807	
Alexander Lambe Robertson and William Thomson (joint)	25 August 1812	
De Carteret Mendell	5 November 1819	
William Smith	17 May 1823	
Archibald Duncan	7 September 1825	
William Anderson	8 November 1828	Marchmont
Alexander Macdonald	3 June 1829	
William Anderson	7 May 1845	Marchmont
John Whyte	29 June 1863	
Robert Riddle Stodart	9 May 1864	
James William Mitchell	4 June 1886	Rothesay
Office abolished in 1867.

== See also ==
- Heraldry Society of Scotland
