= A Practical Guide to Racism =

2007 book by Sam Means

- Author: Sam Means
- Language: English
- Genre: Satire humor
- Publisher: Gotham Books
- Publication date: December 27, 2007
- Publication place: USA
- Media type: Hardback
- Pages: 224 pp (1st edition)
- ISBN: 1-59240-348-4
- OCLC: 152580699

A Practical Guide to Racism is a 2007 humorous satirical book written by Sam Means under the pseudonym C.H. Dalton. The book is similar to the Douglas Sutherland book The English Gentleman, in that it is constructed as a "guide" to the behaviors of various social groups (in this case ethnic races) built entirely out of stereotypes associated with said groups. It reached number 8 on the LA Times Bestseller list shortly after its release.
