= Hatchment =

Hatchment may refer to:

- Hatchment (heraldic achievement), a full display of all the heraldic components to which the bearer of a coat of arms is entitled
- Funerary hatchment, a depiction within a black lozenge-shaped frame of a deceased's heraldic achievement
