= Doorward Guard of Partizans =

Scottish ceremonial military unit

The Doorward Guard of Partizans
- Country: Scotland
- Type: Ceremonial Bodyguard
- Role: Royal bodyguard
- Size: 24
- Garrison/HQ: Holyrood Palace

Commanders
- Current commander: Merlin Hay, 24th Earl of Erroll
- Ceremonial chief: Lord High Constable of Scotland

The Doorward Guard of Partizans is a Scottish ceremonial bodyguard unit. It is composed of personal retainers of the Earl of Erroll, chief of the Clan Hay and Lord High Constable of Scotland, appointed to guard the King's body under the Constable. It is claimed to be the oldest bodyguard in Britain.

== History ==
Historically the King of Scotland would appoint an officer called a Hostarius who was charged with guarding the king's door. This position was known in Scotland as a Durward or 'Door ward'. By the 1300s the Lord High Constable of Scotland was placed in charge of a bodyguard of 24 sergeant partizans to guard the king's body under the Constable. They would generally operate in shifts of 12 until vespers when the whole guard would watch the king's chamber all night. When the Court moved, the twenty-four doorwards went or ran on foot before the Constable. The guard were all said to be gentlemen of good family. They formed part of the King's procession in 1822.

The bodyguard continues to be appointed, and in 2018 formed part of the birthday celebrations of the Earl of Erroll.
