= Funerary hatchment =

Heraldic memorial to a deceased person

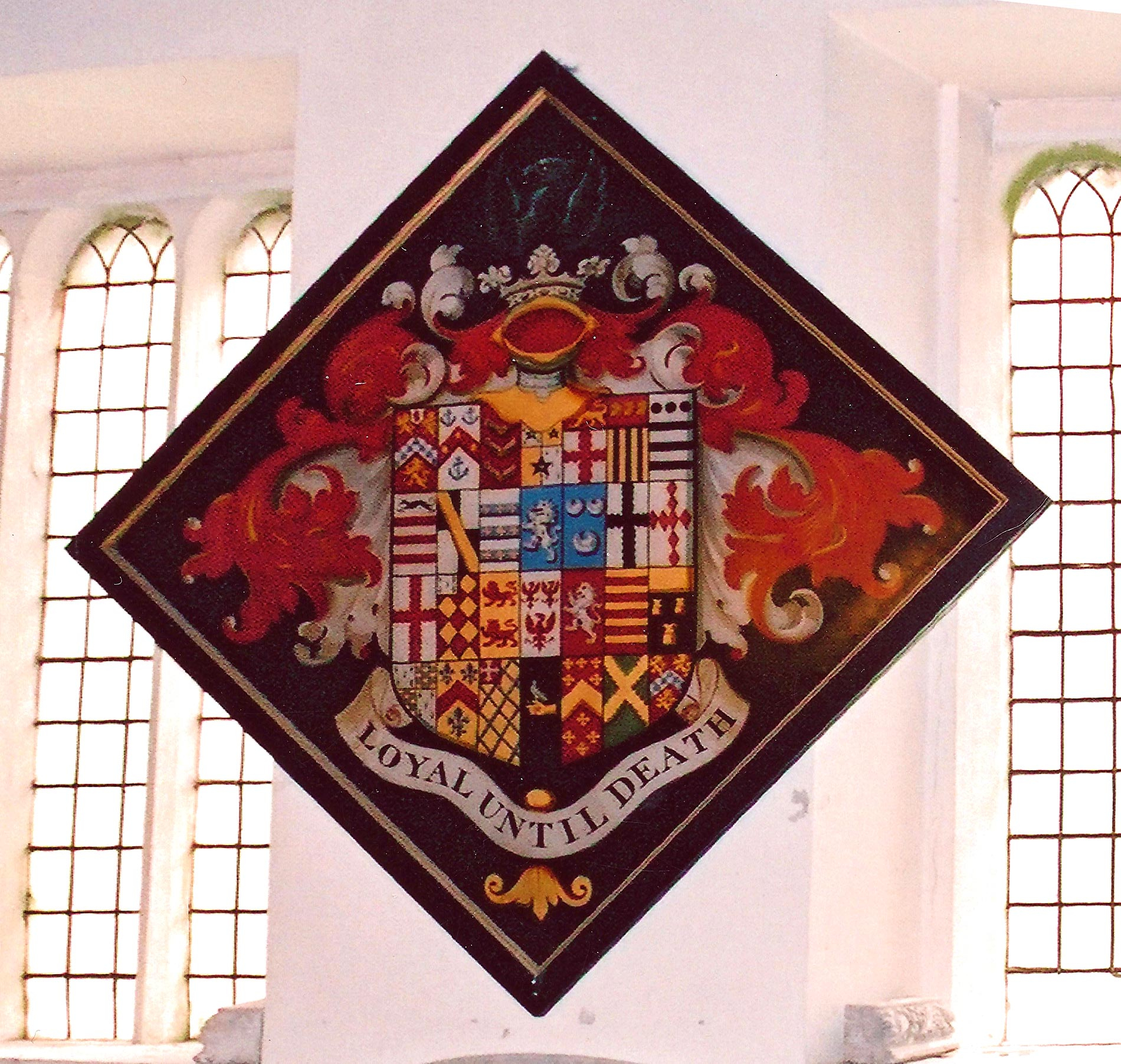
The funerary hatchment of Sir Thomas White, 2nd Baronet (1801–1882), at Tuxford Church in Nottinghamshire

A funerary hatchment is a depiction within a black lozenge-shaped frame, generally on a black (sable) background, of a deceased's heraldic achievement, that is to say the escutcheon showing the arms, together with the crest and supporters of his family or person. Regimental Colours and other military or naval emblems are sometimes placed behind the arms of military or naval officers. Such funerary hatchments would therefore generally be restricted in use to members of the nobility or armigerous gentry, and were hung on the wall of a deceased person's house. They were later transferred to the parish church, often within the family chapel therein which appertained to the manor house; the lord of the manor usually held the advowson of the church. In Germany, the approximate equivalent is a Totenschild, literally "shield of the dead".

== Etymology ==
The ancient term used in place of "achievement" was "hatchment", being a corruption (through such historic forms as atcheament, achement, hathement, etc.) of the French achèvement, from the verb achever, a contraction of à chef venir ("to come to a head"), ultimately from Latin ad caput venire, "to come to a head", thus to reach a conclusion, accomplish, achieve. The word "hatchment" in its historical usage is thus identical in meaning and origin to the English heraldic term "achievement". However, in modern times the word "hatchment" has come to be used almost exclusively to denote "funerary hatchment", whilst "achievement" is now used in place of "hatchment" in a non-funereal context. An example of the historic use of "hatchment" in a non-funerary context to denote what is now termed "achievement" is in the statute of the Order of the Garter laid down by King Henry VIII (1509–1547) concerning the regulation of Garter stall plates:

It is agreed that every knyght within the yere of his stallation shall cause to be made a scauchon of his armes and hachementis in a plate of metall suche as shall please him and that it shall be surely sett upon the back of his stall.

The word appears in Shakespeare's play Hamlet (1599/1602): Laertes laments that his dead father Polonius has "No trophy, sword or hatchment o'er his bones" (Act IV, Scene 5). The word scutcheon, an alternative word for a funerary hatchment, appears in Shakespeare's play Henry IV, Part 1: Falstaff: "Honour is a mere scutcheon, and so ends my catechism." (Act V, Scene 1).

== Usage ==
=== England ===
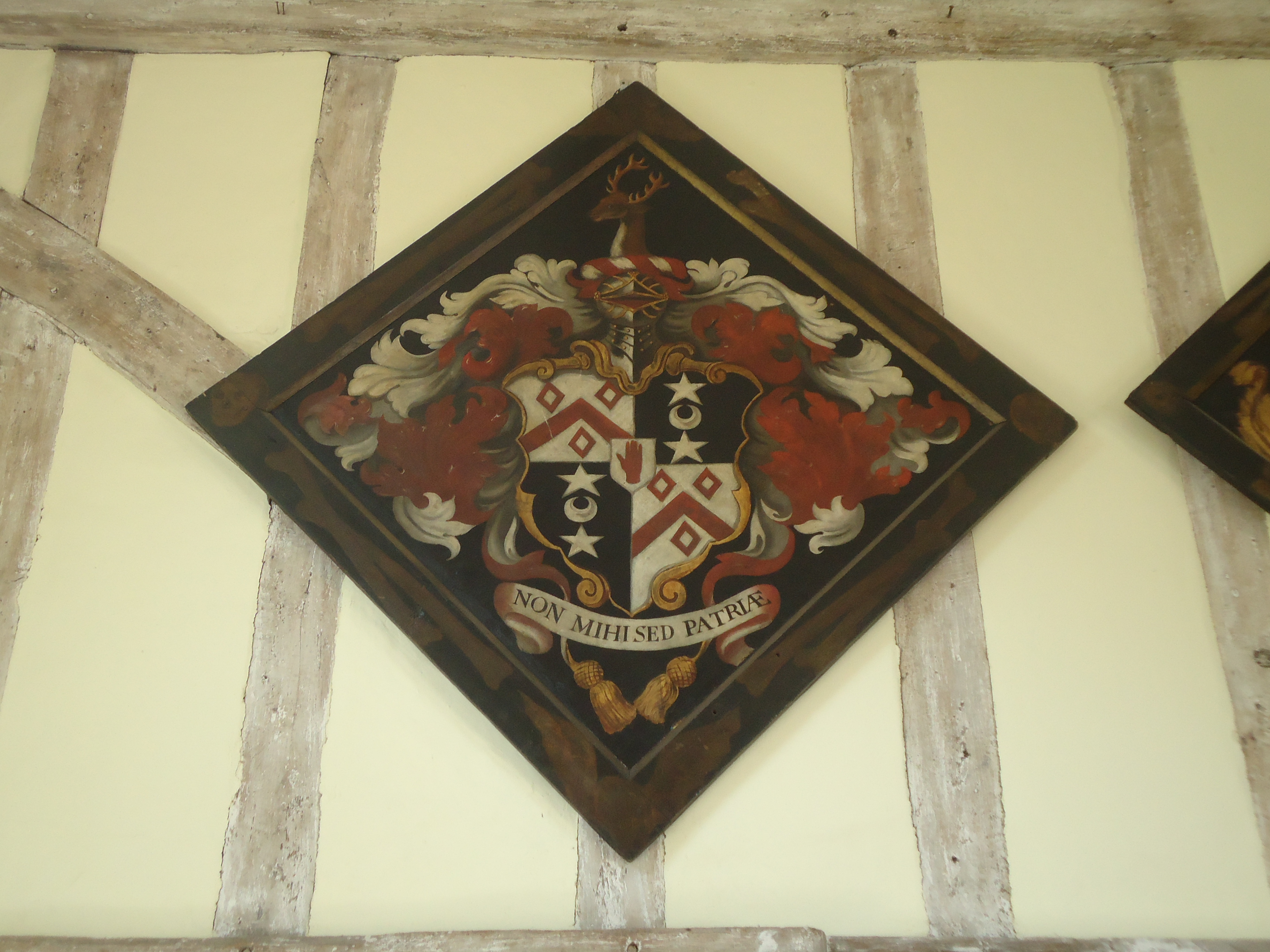
Funerary hatchment of Sir William Spring, 4th Baronet (d.1737), of Pakenham, displayed in Lavenham Guildhall in Suffolk

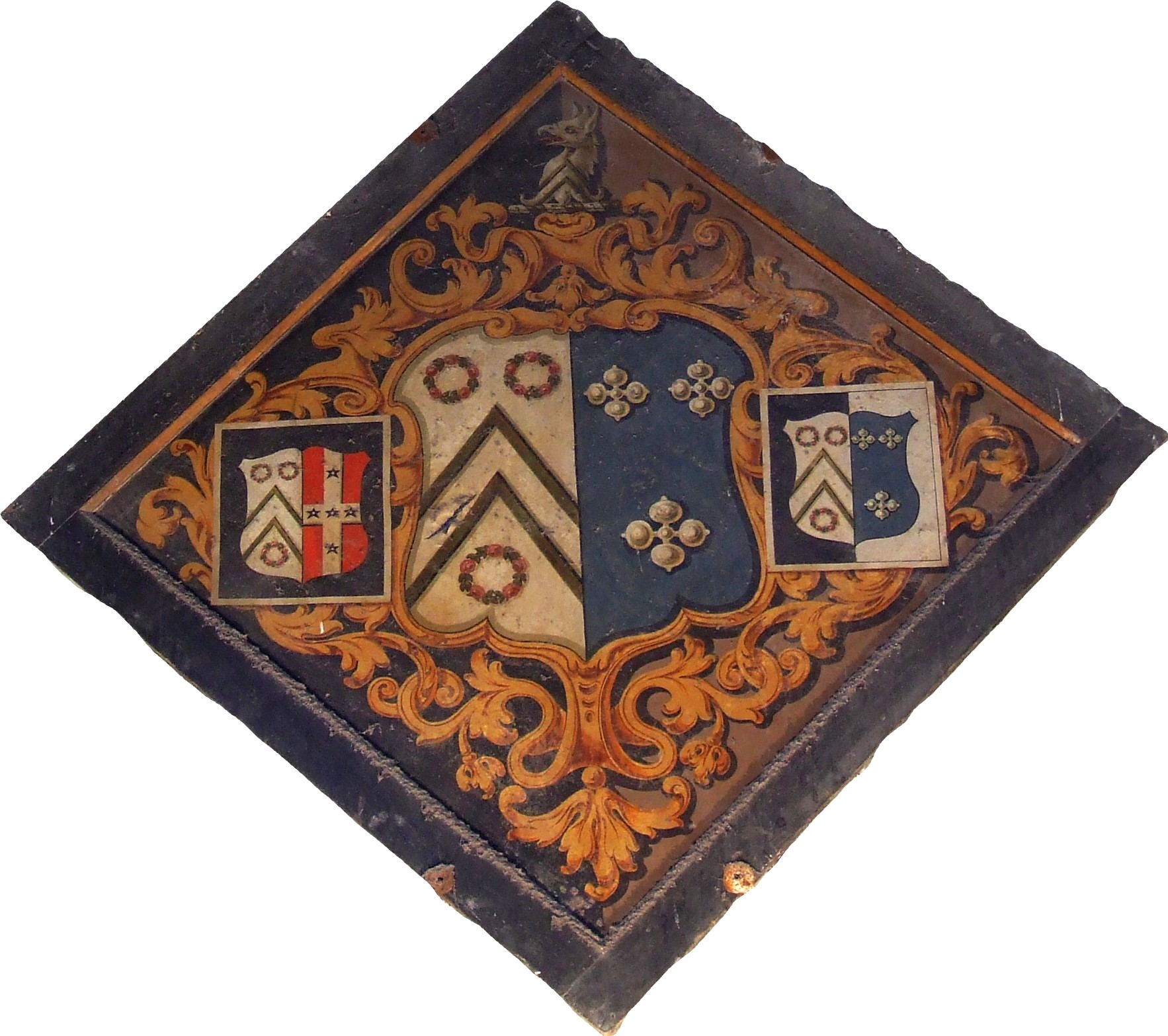
Hatchment in Wymondham Abbey bell chamber, Norfolk

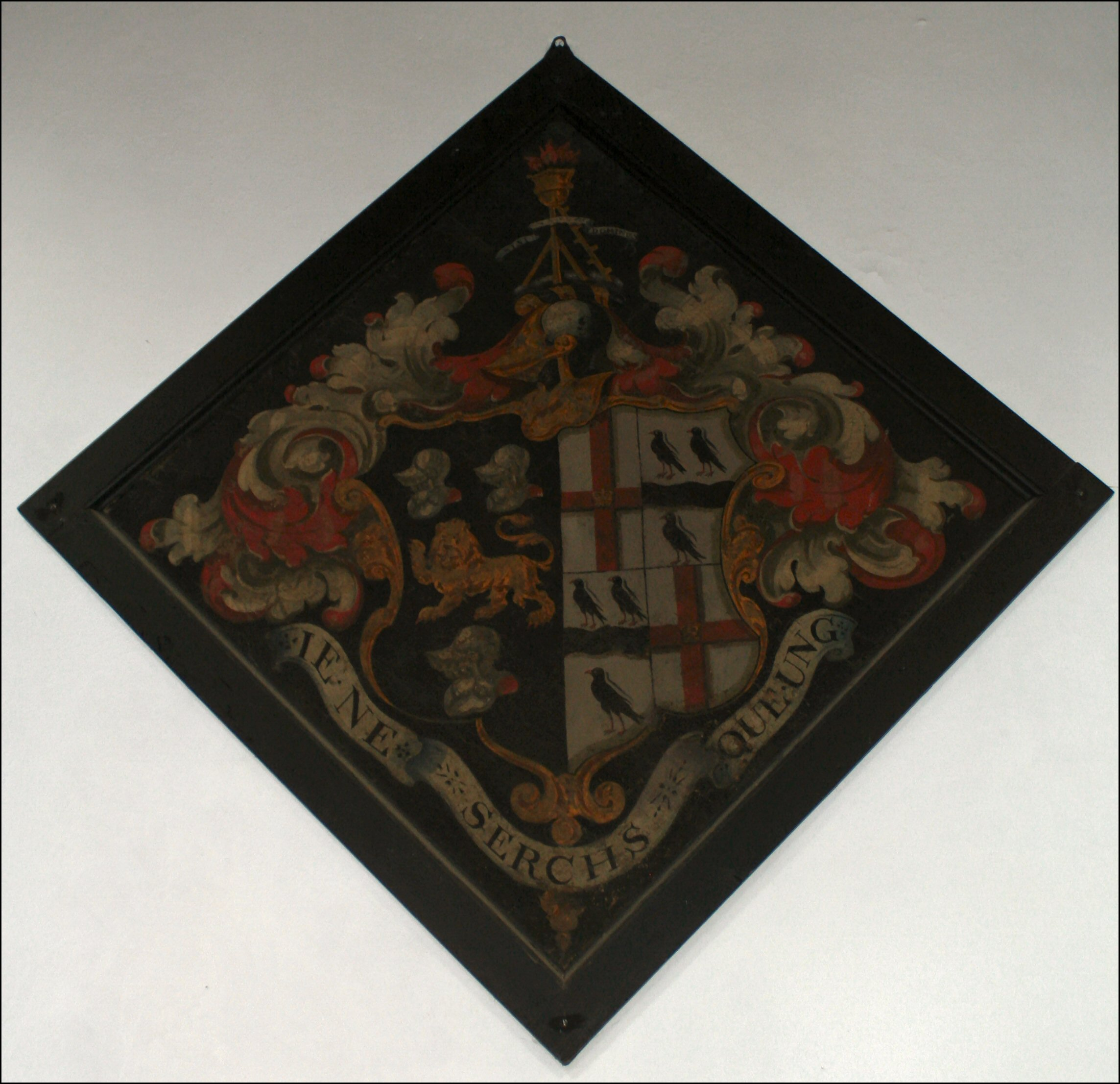
Funerary hatchment at Grendon parish church in Northamptonshire, showing in the dexter half the arms of Compton, Marquess of Northampton

The funerary hatchment was usually placed over the entrance door of the deceased's residence at the level of the second floor, and remained in situ for six to twelve months, after which it was removed to the parish church. The practice developed in the early 17th century from the custom of carrying an heraldic shield before the coffin of the deceased, then leaving it for display in the church. Funerary hatchments also survive displayed in homes or local museums. In medieval times and later, helmets and shields were sometimes deposited in churches, and helmets (made for the purpose) survive for example in the churches of Iron Acton in Gloucestershire and King's Nympton in Devon.

At the universities of Oxford and Cambridge it was usual to hang the funerary hatchment of a deceased head of house over the entrance to his lodge or residence.

In the 21st century the display of funerary hatchments has largely been discontinued, except in the case of royalty and occasionally by the higher nobility, but many ancient funerary hatchments survive displayed in parish churches throughout England.

==== Male and female usages ====
For a bachelor the hatchment bears his heraldic achievement (shield, crest, supporters and other appendages) on a black lozenge. For a spinster, her arms are represented upon a lozenge, bordered with knotted ribbons, also on a black lozenge. In the case of a married man with a surviving wife, within his funerary hatchment is an escutcheon displaying his arms impaling the paternal arms of his wife. If she should be an heraldic heiress her paternal arms are placed upon an inescutcheon of pretence, and crest and other appendages are added. The dexter half of the background is black (the husband being dead), whilst the sinister half of the background is white (his wife still being alive).

For a deceased woman whose husband is alive the same arrangement is used, but the sinister background is black (for the wife) and the dexter background is white (for the surviving husband). For a widower the same is used as for a married man, but the whole ground is black (both spouses being dead). For a widow the husband's arms are given with her own, but upon a lozenge in place of an escutcheon, with ribbons, without crest or appendages, with the whole of the ground black. When there have been two wives or two husbands the ground may be divided in a number of different ways. Sometimes the shield is divided into three parts per pale (vertical divisions), with the husband's arms in the middle section and the arms of each of his wives to each side of his. Sometimes the husband's arms remain in the dexter half and the two wives have their arms in the sinister half, divided per fess (horizontal divisions), each wife having one quarter of the whole shield, that is one half of the sinister half.

=== Scotland ===
In Scottish funerary hatchments it was not unusual to place the arms of the father and mother of the deceased in the two lateral angles of the lozenge, and sometimes there are 4, 8 or 16 genealogical escutcheons ranged along the margin.

=== Belgium and Netherlands ===
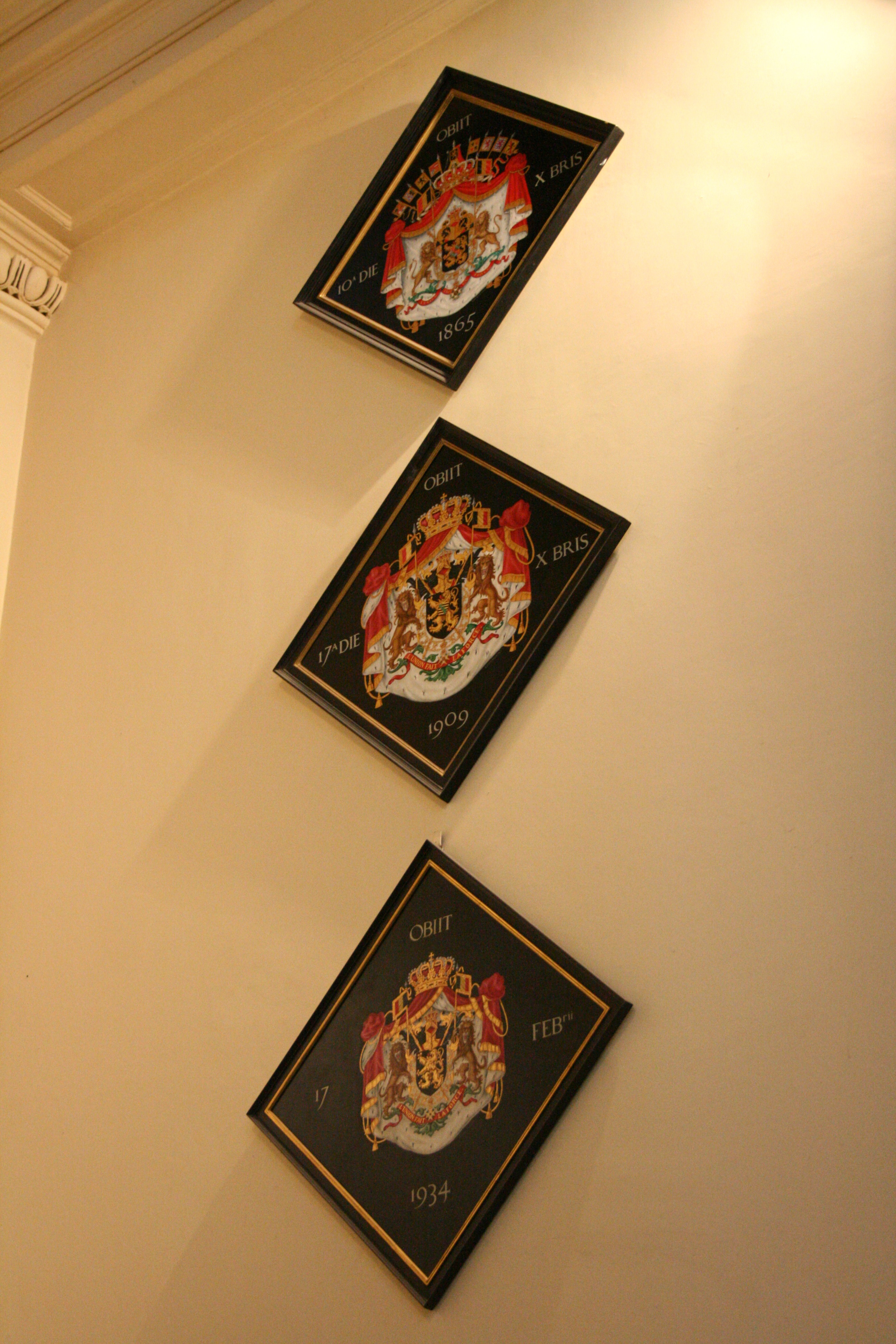
Royal hatchments at the Church of St. James on Coudenberg in Brussels

In the Netherlands, hatchments (in Dutch, rouwbord, literally meaning "mourning shield") with the word "OBIIT" (Latin:"deceased") and the date of death were hung over the door of the deceased's house and later on the wall of the church where he was buried. In the 17th century the hatchments were sober black lozenge-shaped frames with the coat of arms. In the 18th century both the frames and the heraldry got more and more elaborate. Symbols of death like batwings, skulls, hour-glasses and crying angels with torches were added and the names of the 8, 16 or even 32 armigerous forebears (sometimes an invention, there were a lot of "nouveaux riches") and their genealogical escutcheons were displayed. The British tradition of differentiating between the hatchments of bachelors, widowers and others is unknown in the Low Countries. The arms of a widow are sometimes surrounded by a cordelière (knotted cord) and the arms of women are often, but not always, shaped like a lozenge. There were no Kings of Arms to rule and regulate these traditions.

In 1795 the Dutch republic, recently conquered by revolutionary France, issued a decree that banned all heraldic shields. Thousands of hatchments were chopped to pieces and burned. In the 19th century the hatchments were almost forgotten and only a few noble families kept the tradition alive.

In Flanders, the clergy of the Roman Catholic Church have kept the tradition of putting up hatchments alive to this day. Noble families have continued to put up hatchments in churches.

Unlike the British hatchments the Dutch and Belgian examples are often inscribed with dates of birth and death, often the Latin words "obit", "nascent" and "svea" are used to give the dates of death and birth and the age of the deceased. The name and titles are sometimes added along with the arms of various ancestors.

Sometimes the coats of arms of man and woman are shown on a hatchment.

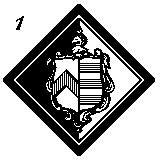
Hatchment of a man leaving a surviving wife

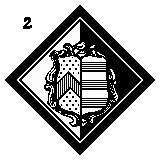
Hatchment of a woman leaving a surviving husband

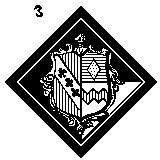
Hatchment of a man who dies after his first wife (her arms top right), and before his second wife (her arms bottom right)

== Scotland ==
Only about fifty hatchments still exist in Scotland, unlike the many to be found in England and the Netherlands, where there may well be more Scots hatchments surviving than in Scotland. Part of this is undoubtedly due to the Church of Scotland in the mid 17th century. In 1643 the General Assembly passed an Act in 1643 which prohibited 'Honours of Arms or any such like monuments' to be displayed in any church. A surviving document of Strathbogie in Aberdeenshire records that: "Att Grange, 19th December, 1649... the presbytry finding some pinselis in memorie of the dead hinging in the kirk, presentlie caused them to be pulled doun in face of presbytry, and the minister rebuiked for suffering to hing ther so long."

Scots hatchments do not follow in the sparse pattern that modern writers prescribe for hatchments and funeral heraldry, being sometimes quite highly decorated with the coats of antecedents and with tears, skulls (mort heads) and mantles.

Hatchments, and funeral heraldry in general, are discussed in a 1986 article by Charles J Burnett, Dingwall Pursuivant.

== Canada ==
There are eight hatchments in Nova Scotia, Canada, which are located in St. Paul's Church in Halifax. They include:

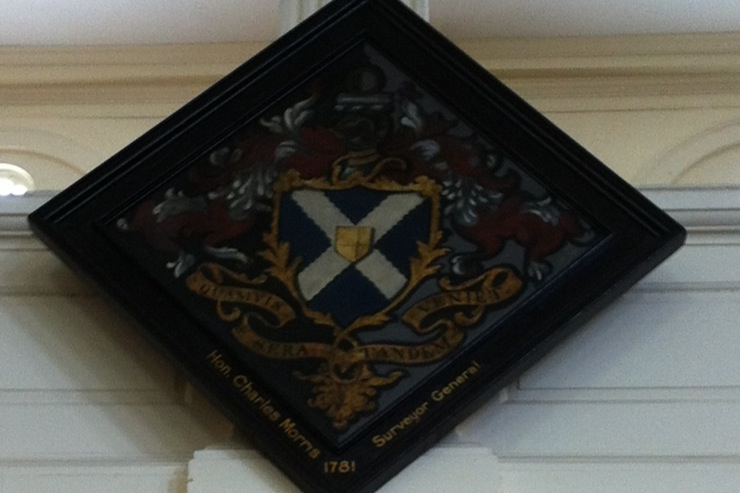
Charles Morris (surveyor general)

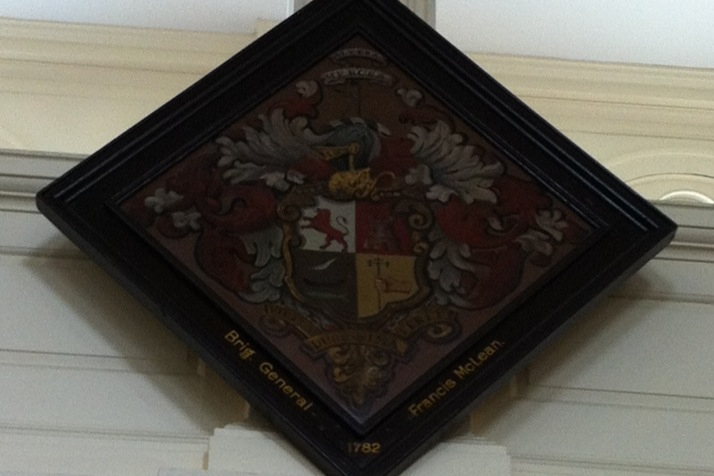
Francis McLean (British army officer)

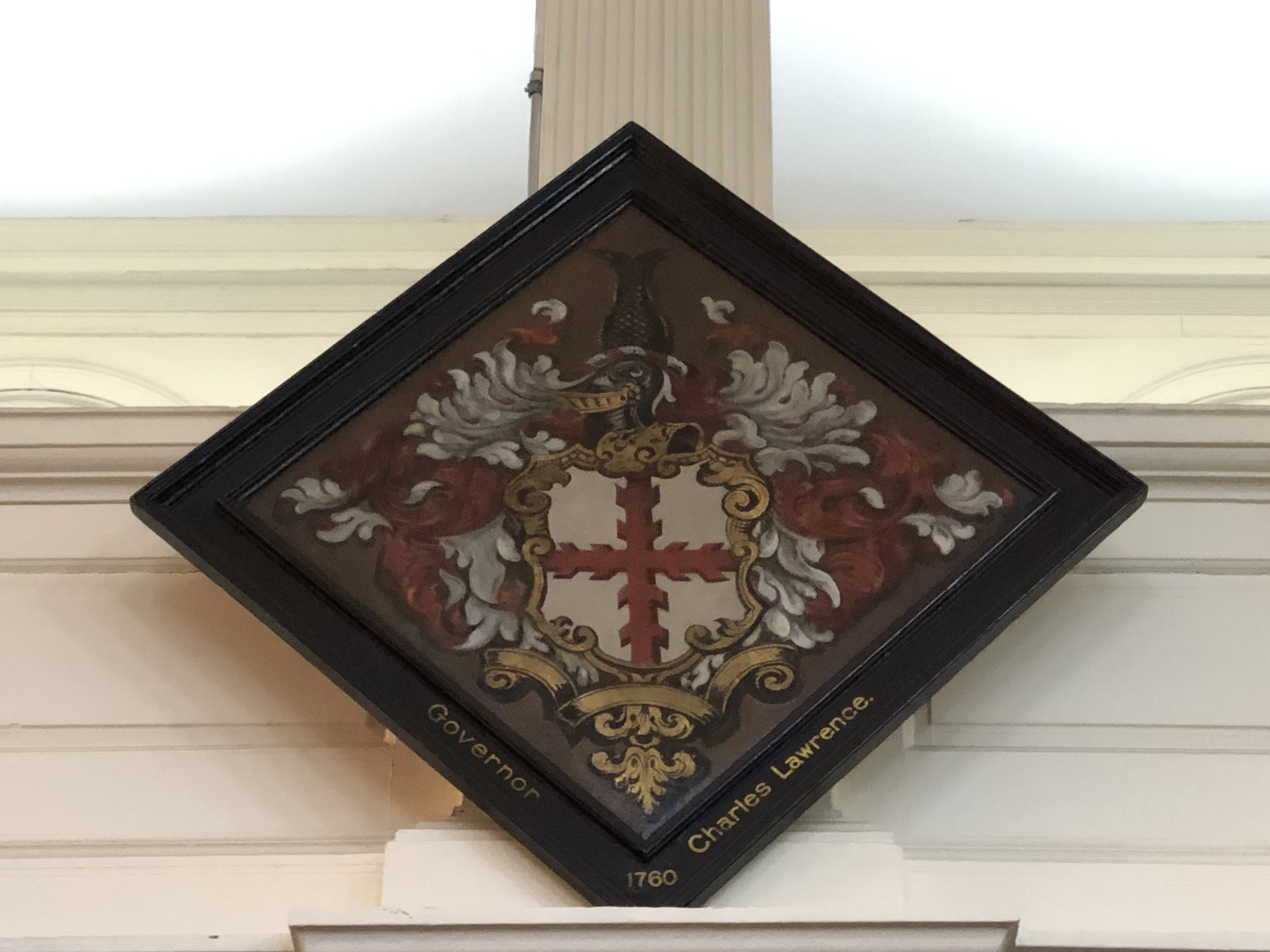
Charles Lawrence (British Army officer)

== South Africa ==
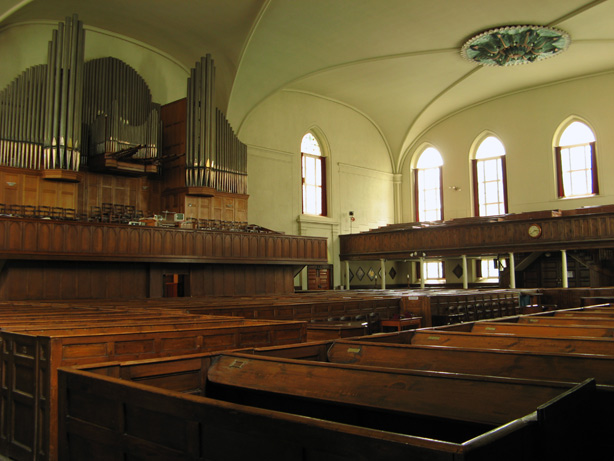
Some of the rouwborden in the Groote Kerk, Cape Town can be seen on the walls below the gallery to the right of this photo.

Twenty-nine 18th- and early 19th-century Dutch-style rouwborden ('mourning boards') are known to survive in the province of the Western Cape, which was a Dutch colony from 1652 to 1806. Twenty-five are in the Groote Kerk in Cape Town, one is in the Western Cape Archives, and the other three are in museums.

During the period of Dutch rule, the display of rouwborden was evidently restricted to senior officials and military officers, and a few high-ranking foreign dignitaries who died at the Cape. When the main part of the church building was demolished in 1836, because it had become structurally unsound, the rouwborden were stored in the tower. They were left there after the rebuilt church was completed in 1841, and reportedly deteriorated with the passage of time. Some forty years later, the newly established Colonial Archives rescued twenty-five of them, and they were displayed in the Archives until the church reclaimed them in 1910. They were then hung in the vestry, and it was not until the 1960s that they were hung in the church itself.

== Sources ==
- Summers, Peter G.; Titterton, John E., eds. (1974–1994). Hatchments in Britain. Vol. 10 vols. ISBN 9780850330854.
