= Elizabeth Roads =

Former Scottish herald (born 1951)

Elizabeth Ann Roads, LVO, CStJ (née Bruce; born 1951) is a former Scottish herald, an office from which she retired in 2021; in July 2018, she retired as Lyon Clerk at the Court of the Lord Lyon.

== Personal life and education ==
Elizabeth Roads is the daughter of Lt Col. James Bruce MC and his wife Mary Hope Sinclair. She was born in 1951 and educated at Lansdowne House in Edinburgh, the Cambridgeshire College of Technology, the Study Centre for Fine Art in London, and Edinburgh Napier University (LLB with distinction). She married Christopher Roads in 1983. They have two sons, Timothy and William, and a daughter, Emily; they also have a granddaughter and grandson.

== Career ==
Having worked for Christie's Auctioneers in London, Elizabeth Roads joined the staff of the Court of the Lord Lyon in 1975 and was appointed Lyon Clerk and Keeper of the Records in 1986 an office she held until her retirement in 2018. In this position, she maintained, among other things, the Public Register of All Arms and Bearings in Scotland. She was appointed Linlithgow Pursuivant in 1987, becoming the first female Officer of arms in the world. This was a temporary appointment, when she represented the Lord Lyon in Canada in the discussions that led to the establishment of the Canadian Heraldic Authority. Roads was appointed Carrick Pursuivant in 1992 and promoted to Snawdoun Herald in 2010, and retired from being an officer of arms in 2021.She briefly held the office of Lord Lyon King of Arms ad interim at the end of 2017 during the absence of the Lord Lyon. She was appointed Secretary of the Order of the Thistle in 2014, having been Deputy Secretary since 2008.

In 2026, she was appointed Chancellor, and Board member, of the Priory of Scotland, Most Venerable Order of St John of Jerusalem. She has been a Chapter Member of the Priory of Scotland of the Most Venerable Order of St John of Jerusalem since 2018.

As Elizabeth Bruce, Roads was a founder member of the Heraldry Society of Scotland in 1977. She was Chairman of that Society in the late 1990s and is now a Vice President and Fellow of the Heraldry Society of Scotland, Fellow of the Heraldry Society of New Zealand and of the Heraldry Society, an Honorary Fellow of the Royal Heraldry Society of Canada and an Honorary Member of the Heraldry Society of Sweden. She is an Academician and President of the Academie Internationale d'Heraldique and a Fellow and Honorary Fellow of the Society of Antiquaries of Scotland, honours in recognition of her heraldic expertise. She has published many articles and lectures regularly at home and abroad on heraldic and genealogical subjects.

She is currently (appointed 2022) President of the Academie Internationale d'Heraldique and a former President of the Bureau Permanent des Congres Genealogique et Heraldique. She also serves on the board of the International Commission on Orders of Chivalry and the International Confederation of Genealogy and Heraldry.

In addition to her heraldic interests, she is a Trustee of the Black Watch Regimental Trust, Chairman of the Royal Celtic Society, Heraldic Adviser to the Standing Council of Scottish Chiefs, a Trustee of Scotland's Churches Trust, a Council member of the Scottish Records Association, and Diocesan Secretary, Lay Representative and Lay member of Synod of the Diocese of St Andrews, Dunkeld and Dunblane of the Scottish Episcopal Church. She was (2019–2025) an Independent Patron of Cowane's Hospital Trust, one of Scotland's two oldest charities and Lord Dean of the Incorporation of the Merchant Guildry of Stirling founded in 1119 and remains a member of the Lord Dean's Council.

== Orders and decorations ==
Lieutenant of the Royal Victorian Order (LVO)	2012
Member of the Royal Victorian Order (MVO)	1990
Commander of the Order of St. John (CStJ)	2024
Officer of the Order of St. John (OStJ)	1999
Queen Elizabeth II Silver Jubilee Medal	1977
Queen Elizabeth II Golden Jubilee Medal	2002
Queen Elizabeth II Diamond Jubilee Medal	2012

== Arms ==
Coat of arms of Elizabeth Roads
Notes Elizabeth Roads bears Arms appropriate to her maiden name of Bruce, incorporating the arms of Sinclair (for her mother) as a difference. Sometimes bore her arms on a shield of oval form. Crest From a Wreath of Or and Gules a dexter Arm in armour embowed the hand proper grasping a broken Sceptre Gules. Escutcheon Or a Saltire Gules on a Chief Gules a Pale Argent charged of a Cross engrailed Sable. Motto Sic Fuimus ("So we were") Previous versions Formerly bore the arms with a bordure or.

== See also ==
- Heraldry
- Pursuivant
- Herald
- The Court of the Lord Lyon
- The Heraldry Society of Scotland

Heraldic offices
Preceded by Don Pottinger	Lyon Clerk and Keeper of the Records; 1986–2018	Succeeded by Russell Hunter
Preceded by Don Pottinger	Linlithgow Pursuivant; 1987	Succeeded by John Charles Grossmith George
Preceded by John Alexander Spens	Carrick Pursuivant; 1992–2010	Succeeded by George Way of Plean
Preceded by William Robert Montignani	Snawdoun Herald; 2010–2021	Vacant
