= Clan Moncreiffe =

Highland Scottish clan

- Monadh Craoibhe
- Crest: Issuing from a crest coronet Or, a demi-lion rampant Gules, armed and langued Azure.
- Motto: Sur Esperance (Upon hope)

Profile
- Region: Highlands
- District: Perthshire
- Plant badge: Oak

Chief
- The Hon. Peregrine Moncreiffe of that Ilk
- Baron of Moncreiffe and Easter Moncreiffe
Septs of Clan Moncreiffe
Moncreiffe, Moncreife, Moncreif, Moncrieffe, Moncriefe, Moncrief
Clan branches
Moncreiffe of Moncreiffe (chiefs)
Moncreiff of Tulliebole (principal cadets)
Moncreiff of Bandirran
Moncreiff of Kinmonth
Scot-Moncreiffs
Allied clans
Clan Ruthven
Clan Murray
Rival clans
Clan Charteris

Clan Moncreiffe is a Highland Scottish clan.

== History ==
=== Origins ===
The name Moncreiffe comes from the feudal barony of Moncreiffe in Perthshire. The lands of Moncreiffe take their name from the Monadh croibhe which is Scottish Gaelic for Hill of the sacred bough. The plant badge of the clan is the oak and this presumably comes from the sacred tree. Moncreiffe Hill dominates the south-east Perth valley and was a stronghold of the Pictish kings. This connects the clan with the lands of Atholl and Dundas, both of which were held by branches of the Picto-Scottish royal house.

Albany Herald and chief of the clan Iain Moncreiffe (1919–1985) asserted that the coat of arms with the red royal lion on a silver shield were the colours of the house of Maldred, Regent of Cumbria and brother of Duncan I of Scotland, indicating that they were cadets of Maldred's line. Maldred himself was a descendant of Niall of the Nine Hostages, king of Ireland.

In 1248 Matthew Muncrephe received a charter from Alexander II of Scotland for lands in Perthshire. Sir John Moncref and William de Moncrefe were amongst the many Scottish nobles who pledged loyalty to Edward I of England.

=== 15th and 16th centuries ===
Malcolm Moncreiffe the sixth Laird was a member of James II of Scotland's council and received from him a charter incorporating his Highland and Lowland estates into the barony of Moncreiffe. He died in about 1465 and was succeeded by his son, the seventh Laird who was James III of Scotland's chamberlain and shield bearer. The seventh Laird married Beatrix, daughter of James Dundas of that Ilk, but was murdered some time before 1475 by Flemish pirates.

The three main branches of the clan descend from the eighth Laird of Moncreiffe who died in about 1496. The Moncreiffes of Moncreiffe are the chiefly line of the clan. The principal cadets of the clan are the Baron Moncreiffs of Tulliebole. From the barons descend the Moncreiffs of Bandirran, from whom the Moncreiffs of Kinmonth and the Scot-Moncreiffs descend.

During the sixteenth century one branch of the Clan Moncreiffe joined the famous Scots Guard of Archers for the king of France and established at least three noble French families. However the Marquis de Moncrif was one of the French nobles who met his end on the guillotine during the French Revolution.

In 1513, Sir John Moncreiffe, the ninth Laird was killed at the Battle of Flodden, as was his cousin, John, Baron of Easter Moncreiffe. His son was William Moncreiffe the tenth Laird who supported the Douglas Earl of Angus and in 1532 was fined for refusing to attend the Court that condemned Janet Douglas, Lady Glamis to be burned to death as a witch, when her only crime was that of being a Douglas by birth. William Moncreiffe was later captured at the Battle of Solway Moss in 1542 and was imprisoned in the Tower of London. When he was released he embraced the Protestant religion and was one of the barons who subscribed to the Articles in the General Assembly of the Church of Scotland in 1567.

In 1544, the Clan Moncreiffe supported the Clan Ruthven in a clan battle against the Clan Charteris. The Ruthvens held considerable sway over Perth from their Huntingtower Castle. In 1544 Patrick, Lord Ruthven was elected as Provost of Perth but at the intervention of Cardinal Beaton, Ruthven was deprived of the office and Charteris of Kinfauns was appointed instead. The city refused to acknowledge Charteris and barred the gates against him. Charteris along with Lord Gray and the Clan Leslie then attacked the town, however they were repulsed by the Ruthvens who were assisted by the Clan Moncreiffe. As a result Ruthven remained Provost of Perth until 1584 when William Ruthven, Earl of Gowrie was executed.

=== 17th century and civil war ===
Sir John Moncreiffe the twelfth Laird and chief of Clan Moncreiffe was made Baronet of Nova Scotia in April 1626. However John was unable to support the king and signed the National Covenant in 1638. His son also called John personally raised a company of the King's Scots Guards by warrant of Charles II of England in 1674. This John was heavily in debt and in 1667 a charter was secured for a family agreement whereby the Barony of Moncreiffe was sold to Thomas Moncreiffe who was a direct descendant of the eighth Laird of Moncreiffe. However the Baronetcy of Moncreiffe passed to John's brother.

In 1685, a second Moncreiffe baronetcy was created in which Thomas, now the fourteenth Laird was himself created a baronet by James II of England and VII of Scotland. Thomas later became Clerk of Exchequer in Scotland and baillie of the Regality of St Andrews. He commissioned a new seat at Moncreiffe which was the first major country house to be completed by Sir William Bruce in 1679.

== Clan chief and seat ==
A new seat was built for the Chief at Moncreiffe, the first major country house completed by Sir William Bruce in 1679. It was the family seat until it was destroyed by fire in November 1957, claiming the life of Sir David Moncreiffe of that Ilk, 10th Baronet, the twenty-third Laird. This tragedy led to the chiefship of the great Scottish herald and historian Sir Iain Moncreiffe of that Ilk, 11th Baronet.

Sir David’s sister, Miss Elizabeth Moncreiffe of Moncreiffe, was his heir, but declared that it was her wish that he be succeeded by her cousin, Sir Iain, the Baron of Easter Moncreiffe, while she retained the feudal barony of Moncreiffe. She built a modern country house on the site of the old seat which incorporates the doorway reclaimed from the ashes of the burned house. Sir Iain died in 1985 and the chiefship reverted to Miss Moncreiffe. On her death, the chiefship passed to Sir Iain’s younger son, the Hon. Peregrine Moncreiffe of Easter Moncreiffe — his elder brother Merlin having assumed the name and arms of Hay on succeeding their mother Diana as Earl of Erroll and Chief of Clan Hay.

== Clan profile ==
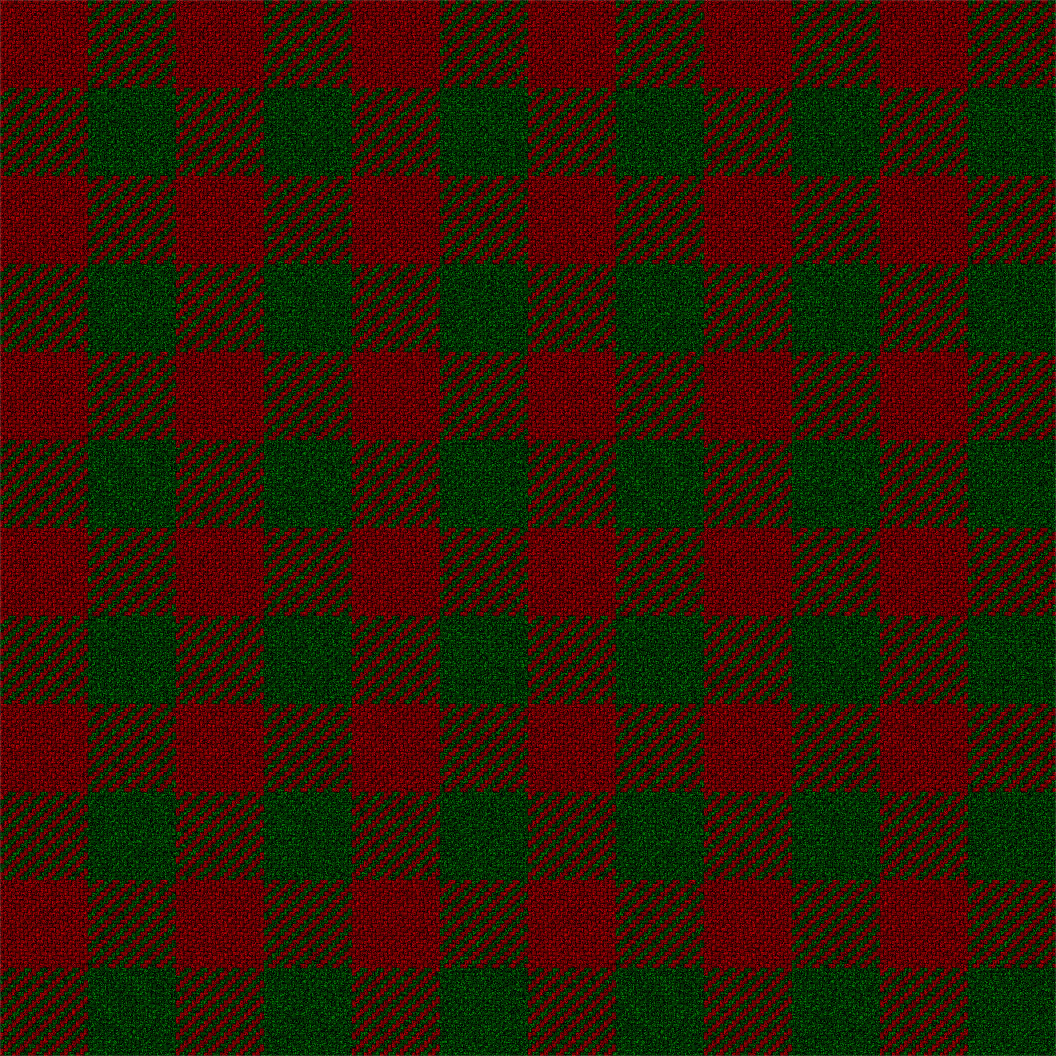
Clan Moncreiffe's tartan

- Gaelic Name: Monadh Craoibhe.
- Motto: Sur Esperance (Upon hope).
- Badge: Oak.
- Lands: Perthshire.
- Origin of Name: Gaelic, Monadh Craoibhe (The Hill of the Sacred Bough).

== Clan septs ==
Moncreiffe septs include:

- Moncreiffe of Montcreiffe – Chief branch.
- Moncreiff of Tulliebole – Founded by the Rev. Archibald Moncreiff, who married Catherine Halliday, heiress of Sir John Halliday of Tulliebole Castle, in 1722. Upon her death in 1740, the estate passed to Moncreiff.
- Moncrieff of Bandirran
  - Scott-Moncreiff
  - Moncreiff of Kinmouth

Spelling variations of the Clan Moncreiffe include: Moncreiffe, Moncrieffe, Moncrieff, Moncreiff, Moncrief, MonCrief, Moncreiff, Montcrieff, Mancrief and Muncrief.

Scott-Moncrief is a branch of the Moncrieffs of Bandirran.

== See also ==
- Baron Moncreiff
- Moncreiffe baronets
