= Charles Ian Fraser =

Scottish British Army officer, historian and officer of arms

Arms of Charles Fraser of Reelig

Charles Ian Fraser of Reelig CBE TD DL (1903–1963) was a Scottish British Army officer, historian and officer of arms.

Fraser was a commissioned officer in the Lovat Scouts. He served in the Second World War and in 1942 he was awarded the Efficiency Decoration. In 1944 he was appointed a Deputy Lieutenant for Inverness-shire. He was confirmed in the honorary rank of Major in 1951. He was later granted the honorary rank of Colonel. He was made a Commander of the Order of the British Empire in the 1962 New Year Honours for his work as Chairman of the Territorial and Auxiliary Forces Association of the County of Inverness.

In 1939, Fraser was made Dingwall Pursuivant herald in the Court of the Lord Lyon. In 1953 he was promoted to Albany Herald. An expert on Scottish clan history, heraldry and genealogy, he contributed two books to Johnston & Bacon's Clan Histories series: The Clan Cameron, A Patriarchy Beset (1953) and The Clan Munro (1954).

In 1929 he married Mary Charity Campbell-Preston and together they had four children. He was Laird of Reelig.

Heraldic offices
Preceded by Samuel Bough	Dingwall Pursuivant; 1939–1953	Succeeded by Charles Burnett
Preceded by Francis James Grant	Albany Herald; 1953–1961	Succeeded by Sir Iain Moncreiffe, Bt
