= Keeper of the Records =

Keeper of the Records can refer to:

- Keeper of the Records of Scotland, the head of the National Archives of Scotland
- Lyon Clerk and Keeper of the Records, a post within the Court of the Lord Lyon, responsible for maintaining the Public Register of All Arms and Bearings in Scotland
- Secretary and Keeper of the Records, the chief executive of the Duchy of Cornwall

== Northern Ireland ==
- Keeper of the Records, a title held by the Minister for Culture, Arts and Leisure
- Deputy Keeper of the Records, the Director of the Public Record Office of Northern Ireland

== See also ==
- Deputy Keeper of the Records or Keeper of Public Records, the chief executive of the Public Record Office
- Keeper of the Archives, a position at the University of Oxford
- List of Keepers of the Records in the Tower of London, an obsolete title
