= Iain Moncreiffe =

British officer of arms

Sir Iain Moncreiffe Bt CVO QC FSA Scot
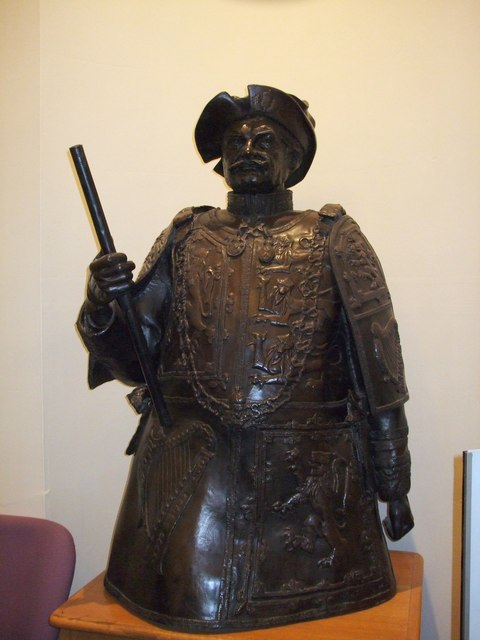
- Bust of Moncreiffe in the Register House, Edinburgh
- Born: 9 April 1919
- Died: 27 February 1985 (aged 65)
- Education: University of Edinburgh; Christ Church, Oxford
- Occupations: Officer of Arms, genealogist
- Spouses: Diana Hay, 23rd Countess of Erroll (m. 1946–1964) Hermione Patricia Faulkner (m. 1966–1985)
- Children: Merlin Hay, 24th Earl of Erroll; Peregrine Moncreiffe of that Ilk; Lady Alexandra Moncreiffe Hay
- Writing career
- Subjects: Genealogy, heraldry
- Notable works: Simple Heraldry (1953); Blood Royal (1956); The Highland Clans (1967)

Sir Rupert Iain Kay Moncreiffe of that Ilk, 11th Baronet, CVO, QC, FSA Scot (9 April 1919 – 27 February 1985), Chief of Clan Moncreiffe, was a British Officer of Arms, historian and genealogist. (Note: He used various forms of his name: His columns for Books and Bookmen were signed Iain Moncreiffe; Royal Highness is by Sir Iain Moncreiffe of that Ilk, Bt.; Simple Heraldry is by Sir Iain Moncrieffe of Easter Moncreiffe. Like other Scottish landowners, and other baronets, he distinguished himself from other Moncreiffes by referring to his estate: of that Ilk is Scots for "of the same [place]", since his estate was Moncreiffe Island itself; (Easter Moncreiffe was the name of his house; Moncreiffe House burnt down in 1957, and its ruins were inherited by his cousin's daughter).)

== Biography ==
Moncreiffe was the son of Lieutenant-Commander Gerald Moncreiffe, RN, and Hilda, daughter of the Comte de Miremont. He succeeded his cousin as 11th Baronet and Chief of Clan Moncreiffe in 1957.

Educated at Stowe School, Heidelberg, and Christ Church, Oxford, as a cadet officer Moncreiffe trained with Derek Bond (actor) and Patrick Leigh Fermor, and served in the Scots Guards during the Second World War, then as attaché at the British embassy in Moscow, before studying Scots Law at the University of Edinburgh. He was awarded a PhD (1958) with a thesis on the Origins and Background of the Law of Succession to Arms and Dignities in Scotland, which was published as a monograph in 2010.

A prominent member of the Lyon Court, Moncreiffe held the offices of Falkland Pursuivant (1952), Kintyre Pursuivant (1953), Unicorn Pursuivant (1955), and (from 1961) Albany Herald. He wrote a popular work about the Scottish clans, The Highland Clans (1967), and with Don Pottinger Simple Heraldry, Cheerfully Illustrated (1953), Simple Custom (1954), and Blood Royal (1956), but his interests also extended to Georgian and Byzantine noble genealogies. Lord of the Dance, A Moncreiffe Miscellany, edited by Hugh Montgomery-Massingberd encompassed his genealogical world-view.

He was elected a Fellow of the American Society of Genealogists in 1969.

He was an incorrigible snob; he even called himself Master Snob. He took silk (relatively late in his career) because very few barristers specialised in heraldic matters and he wished to highlight the importance of this field of speciality. He was a frequent writer of amusing and often illuminating letters to newspapers, particularly The Daily Telegraph, and provided the introduction to Douglas Sutherland's satirical book The English Gentleman (1978). He held membership in many London clubs and founded his own club in Edinburgh, called Puffin's Club, – the name was taken from the nickname of Sir Iain's first wife, 'Puffin', Diana Hay, 23rd Countess of Erroll. It was and continues to be a weekly luncheon club, which between the early 1960s and late 1990s met in Martin's restaurant in Rose Street Lane North, Edinburgh. It still meets monthly in London and Edinburgh. The membership was and is as varied and eccentric as its founder. Ex-King Zog I, King of Albania paid his founding subscription of £5 in 1961, but died before he could attend. The actor Terence Stamp, Sir Nicholas Fairbairn, Sir Fitzroy Maclean and Lord Dacre all attended with varying frequency. It was said that at some point half the crowned heads of Europe were on the list.

== Family ==
Moncreiffe married twice. Firstly Diana Hay, 23rd Countess of Erroll, whom he married on 19 December 1946 at St Margaret's, Westminster. They had three children:

- Merlin Sereld Victor Gilbert Hay, 24th Earl of Erroll, Chief of Clan Hay (b. 20 April 1948).
- Hon. Peregrine David Euan Malcolm Moncreiffe of that Ilk, Chief of Clan Moncreiffe (b. 16 February 1951), married in 1988 Miranda Mary Fox-Pitt (b. 29 December 1968).
- Lady Alexandra Victoria Caroline Anne Moncreiffe Hay (b. 30 July 1955), married Jolyon Connell (b. 16 May 1952); they have two daughters, Flora Diana Catharine Cecelia Connell (b. 24 February 1990) and Ciara Edith Elisabeth Connell (b. 28 March 1994). Lady Alexandra also has a son, Ivar Francis Grey de Miremont Wigan.

Moncreiffe's first marriage was dissolved in 1964 and in 1966 he took as his second wife Hermione Patricia Faulkner, daughter of Lieutenant-Colonel Walter Douglas Faulkner and Patricia Katherine Montagu Douglas Scott.

== Notes ==
Baronetage of Nova Scotia
Preceded by David Moncreiffe	Baronet (of Moncreiffe); 1957–1985	Succeeded by Merlin Hay
Heraldic offices
Preceded by John William Balfour Paul	Falkland Pursuivant; 1952–1953	Succeeded by Don Pottinger
Preceded by Hugh Gray Tibbetts	Kintyre Pursuivant; 1953–1955	Succeeded by Charles Jauncey
Preceded by Gordon Dalyell of the Binns	Unicorn Pursuivant; 1955–1961	Succeeded by Don Pottinger
Preceded by Charles Ian Fraser	Albany Herald; 1961 – bef. 1985	Succeeded by John Spens
