= James Mitchell (herald) =

The arms of James Mitchell

James William Mitchell (1836 – 1898) was a Scottish officer of arms.

In 1879, Mitchell was appointed Carrick Pursuivant in the Court of the Lord Lyon and between 1879 and 1898 he was Rothesay Herald. He was also Lyon Clerk and Keeper of the Records between 6 March 1890 and his death.

Mitchell was a descendant of Sir John Mitchell, 1st Baronet and in 1895 he was recognised as heir male to the Mitchell baronetcy of West Shore by the Sheriff of Chancery. He never assumed or used the title, but he is recorded by some sources, including The National Archives and the Court of the Lord Lyon, as the 9th baronet. Mitchell married Maria Wilmot, daughter of Sir Henry Sacheverel Wilmot, 4th Baronet, on 15 June 1854. Their son, Hugh Sykes Mitchell, also never presented a claim on the baronetcy.

Heraldic offices
Preceded by Vacant	Rothesay Herald; 1879-1898	Succeeded by Sir Francis James Grant
Preceded by Vacant	Carrick Pursuivant; 1879	Succeeded by John Spence
