= David de la Hay =

Scottish nobleman

- Born: c.1318
- Died: 1346 (aged 27–28) west of Durham, England
- Cause of death: killed in Battle of Neville's Cross
- Occupation: Lord High Constable of Scotland
- Spouse: Lady Margaret Innerpeffer Keith
- Father: Nicholas de la Haye

Sir David de la Hay (c. 1318–1346) was Lord High Constable of Scotland.

David was a son of Nicholas de la Haye. He succeeded to his grandfather Gilbert de la Hay's titles as 6th Lord Errol after David's father died at the battle of Dupplin Moor on 10–11 August 1332. He married a daughter of Sir John Keith of Innerpeffer, Lady Margaret Innerpeffer Keith.

David was killed at the Battle of Neville's Cross on 17 October 1346. He was succeeded by his son Thomas de la Haye.
