= Snawdoun Herald =

- The heraldic badge of Snawdoun Herald of Arms
- Heraldic tradition: Gallo-British
- Jurisdiction: Scotland
- Governing body: Court of the Lord Lyon

Snawdoun Herald of Arms in Ordinary is a current Scottish herald of arms in Ordinary of the Court of the Lord Lyon.

The office was first mentioned in 1443 and the title is derived from a part of Stirling Castle which bore the same name. The previous Snawdoun Herald of Arms to serve retired in 1883.

The office was last held by Elizabeth A. Roads, former Lyon Clerk and Keeper of the Records for the Court of the Lord Lyon in Edinburgh. She was appointed to this post on the 17 December 2010, and retired in 2021.

The badge of office is Issuant from battlements Proper a unicorn’s head erased Argent, horned and crined and grasping in his mouth the sword Excalibur Or all ensigned of the Crown of Scotland Proper. The granting of this badge completed the devising of badges for all the ordinary and regularly used extraordinary officer of arms titles.

== Holders of the office ==
Arms	Name	Date of appointment	Ref
	... (was Unicorn Pursuivant)	1467	
	John Scrimgeour of Glaster	1511	
	Sir David Lyndsay of the Mount	1531	
	John Paterson	1543	
	Alexander Guthrie	1571	
	Thomas Lindesay	1571	
	Thomas Tod	1579	
	James Law	1607	
	James Sawers	1643	
	Robert Porteous	1661	
	Andrew Grierson	1665	
	James Dunbar	1682	
	John Dale (or Daill)	1684	
	Peter King	1692	
	James Fairbairn	1703	
	George Philip	1712	
	David Dewar of Balgonie	1715	
	James Fordyce	1728	
	Joseph Strachan	1750	
	Kenneth Mackenzie	1767	
	Daniel Menzies	1821	
	David Alexander	1828	
	James Cook	1845	
	William Robert Montignani	1860	
	Vacant	1883–2010	
	Elizabeth A. Roads	2010–2021	
	Vacant	2021–Present	

== See also ==
- Officer of Arms
- Herald
- Court of the Lord Lyon
- Heraldry Society of Scotland
