= Diana Hay, 23rd Countess of Erroll =

British noblewoman (1926–1978)

The Right Honourable The Countess of Erroll
- Lady Erroll in 1946

Member of the House of Lords Lord Temporal
- In office 29 July 1964 – 16 May 1978; Hereditary Peerage
- Preceded by: The 22nd Earl of Erroll
- Succeeded by: The 24th Earl of Erroll

Personal details
- Born: Lady Diana Denyse Hay; 5 January 1926 Aberdare Range, Kenya
- Died: 16 May 1978 (aged 52) Oban, Argyll, Scotland
- Spouses: Sir Iain Moncreiffe (m. 1946; div. 1964) Raymond Carnegie (after 1964)
- Children: Merlin, Peregrine, Lady Alexandra, Jocelyn
- Parent(s): Josslyn, Earl of Errol; Lady Idina Sackville

Diana Denyse Hay, 23rd Countess of Erroll (5 January 1926 – 16 May 1978) was a British noblewoman.

== Early life ==
Diana was the only child of Josslyn, Earl of Errol and his first wife Lady Idina Sackville. She was born in Kenya. Their home was a bungalow on the slopes of the Aberdare Range which they called Slains, after the former Hay family seat of Slains Castle which was sold by Hay's grandfather, the 20th Earl, in 1916. The bungalow was sited alongside the high altitude farms which other white Kenyans were establishing at the time.

When her mother divorced her father in 1930, she was taken home to England to be raised firstly by her uncle The Earl De La Warr and then by her aunt, Lady Avice Sackville, in Wiltshire.

== Career ==
When her father was murdered in 1941, she inherited the earldom of Erroll and the lordship of Hay, while the barony of Kilmarnock, which could only be inherited by a male heir, passed to her uncle Gilbert Boyd. She also inherited the hereditary position Lord High Constable of Scotland.

After the passing of the Peerage Act 1963 which allowed suo jure peeresses to take a seat in the House of Lords, Lady Erroll did so, with eleven other peeresses.

== Personal life ==
On 19 December 1946, at St Margaret's, Westminster, Lady Erroll married Sir Iain Moncreiffe of that Ilk, the Chief of Clan Moncreiffe and a herald at the Court of the Lord Lyon. Together, they were the parents of three children:

- Merlin Sereld Victor Gilbert, 24th Earl of Erroll (born 1948), who married Belgian-born Isabelle Jacqueline Laline Astell Hohler, in 1982.
- Hon. Peregrine David Euan Malcolm Moncreiffe of that Ilk (born 1951), who became Chief of Clan Moncreiffe and who married Miranda Mary Fox-Pitt, in 1988.
- Lady Alexandra Victoria Caroline Anne Moncreiffe Hay (born 1955), who married Jolyon Connell.

=== Second marriage ===
Moncreiffe and Lady Erroll were divorced in 1964 and on 27 November that year, she married Maj. Raymond Carnegie (born 1920) in Lonmay. Carnegie was a grandson of Charles Carnegie, 7th Earl of Southesk. Together, they were the parents of one son:

- Hon. Jocelyn Jacek Alexander Bannerman Carnegie (born 1966), who married Susan Mhairie Butler in 1990.

Lady Erroll died in 1978, aged 52. Her titles passed to her eldest son, Merlin, the incumbent Earl of Erroll. The cause of death has never been publicly disclosed.

== Sources ==
- Genealogy website

Honorary titles
Preceded by Josslyn Hay	Lord High Constable of Scotland; 1941–1978	Succeeded by Merlin Hay
Peerage of Scotland
Preceded by Josslyn Hay	Countess of Erroll; 1941–1978	Succeeded by Merlin Hay
