= Moyra Fraser =

Australian-born English actress and ballet dancer (1923–2009)

- Born: 3 December 1923; Sydney, New South Wales, Australia
- Died: 13 December 2009 (aged 86); England, UK
- Years active: 1940–2005
- Spouse(s): Douglas Sutherland (1944-54, divorced); Roger Lubbock (1955-87, his death)
- Children: 3
- Relatives: Shelagh Fraser (sister)

Moyra Fraser (3 December 1923 – 13 December 2009) was an Australian-born English actress and ballet dancer, who is best known for playing Penny in the long-running sitcom As Time Goes By.

== Early life ==
Moyra Fraser was born in Sydney, Australia to John Newton Mappin Fraser, a director of Mappin & Webb, and Vera Eleanor (née Beardshaw) on 3 December 1923. Her sister was the actress Shelagh Fraser. Her family emigrated to the United Kingdom in June 1924. She was educated at St Christopher's, Kingswood, and Eversfield, Sutton. She left school at 14 to take up a scholarship with Sadler's Wells Ballet, where she was befriended by ballet dancer Robert Helpmann.

== Stage career ==
Fraser joined the Sadler's Wells Ballet after training, dancing the title role in Giselle, the Lilac Fairy in The Sleeping Princess and creating the role of Hope in The Quest (Ashton/Walton after Spenser). She left the company to play the principal role in Song of Norway at the Palace Theatre, London. Following that Fraser appeared as Venus in The Olympians at Covent Garden, and starred in many plays and pantomimes. These included Girl in the Window and the musical romance Golden City; she was in the revue Airs on a Shoestring at the Royal Court Theatre from 1953 to 1955. The Country Wife followed at the same theatre. She was part of the Old Vic Company in 1959–60, appearing in As You Like It, The Double Dealer and The Merry Wives of Windsor.

In the 1960s and 1970s, she was seen in Through the Looking Glass at the Lyric, Hammersmith, the revue See You Inside, The Buxom Muse, Ring Round the Moon at the Haymarket Theatre in 1968, and for four years was in the farce No Sex Please, We're British.

== Film and television ==
Fraser's first film role was in the musical The Dancing Years (1950), and she then appeared in the David Lean film Madeleine (also 1950). She appeared in the film Here We Go Round the Mulberry Bush (1968) and starred in The Boy Friend (1971). Fraser's television career began in the 1960s, and she appeared on The Benny Hill Show, ITV Playhouse, Hancock, and an episode of Comedy Playhouse in 1973. In 1975, she appeared in two episodes of the BBC Television series The Good Life as Felicity, the wife of Jerry's boss, Andrew.

From 1985 to 1986, Fraser played Annie Jolly in From the Top appearing in a total of 12 episodes. She first played Penny, the sister of Jean's first husband, in 1993, on As Time Goes By. She continued with the part until the programme's final episode in 2005. During the show's run, Fraser appeared in other programmes including Rumpole of the Bailey and Jeeves and Wooster.

== Personal life ==
Fraser married author Douglas Sutherland, with whom she had a daughter, and Roger Lubbock, by whom she had two sons.

== Selected filmography ==
- Madeleine (1950) – Highland Dancer
- The Dancing Years (1950) – Minor Role (uncredited)
- Moulin Rouge (1952) – Cancan Dancer (uncredited)
- The Man Who Loved Redheads (1955) – Ethel
- The V.I.P.s (1963) – Air Hostess
- Here We Go Round the Mulberry Bush (1968) – Mrs. McGregor
- Prudence and the Pill (1968) – Woman in Tea Shop
- The Boy Friend (1971) – Moyra Parkhill / Madame Dubonnet
- Take Me High (1974) – Molly Jones
- A Handful of Dust (1988) – Mrs. Northcote
