= Charles Jauncey, Baron Jauncey of Tullichettle =

British judge and advocate

The Right Honourable The Lord Jauncey of Tullichettle PC

Member of the House of Lords
- Lord Temporal
- Lord of Appeal in Ordinary; 9 February 1988 – 18 July 2007

Personal details
- Born: 8 May 1925
- Died: 18 July 2007 (aged 96)

Charles Eliot Jauncey, Baron Jauncey of Tullichettle, PC (8 May 1925 – 18 July 2007) was a British judge and advocate. He was often praised as one of the finest legal minds of his generation in Scotland, and his legal opinions – both as a practising advocate and as a judge – commanded immense respect.

== Early life and career ==
Jauncey was the son of Captain John Henry Jauncey, who came out of retirement to command destroyers in the Second World War, and Muriel Dundas, daughter of Admiral Sir Charles Dundas. He was educated at Radley College, leaving in 1943 to join the Royal Naval Volunteer Reserve. He served in Egypt and India in the Second World War, from 1943 to 1946, reaching the rank of Sub-Lieutenant. He contracted polio in Ceylon and was invalided home, being left with a slight limp for the rest of his life.

He read law at Christ Church, Oxford, graduating with a Bachelor of Arts degree in jurisprudence in 1947, and at the University of Glasgow, where he received a Bachelor of Laws degree in 1949. He became an advocate of the Scottish Bar in 1949, joining the Faculty of Advocates. He undertook a wide range of civil legal work, but his practice concentrated mostly on wills, trusts and estates. He became a standing junior counsel to the Ministry of Works in Scotland in 1953, and standing junior counsel to the Admiralty in 1954.

Supporting Ian Fraser QC (later Lord Fraser of Tullybelton), he was junior counsel to Margaret Campbell, Duchess of Argyll, from 1959 to 1963 in the notorious divorce action brought by her husband, Ian Campbell, 11th Duke of Argyll, alleging her adultery, which broke new ground in the law of confidentiality. He took silk becoming a Queen's Counsel for Scotland in 1963. He was part-time Sheriff Principal of Fife and Kinross from 1971 to 1974, resigning to continue his legal practice when the position became full-time. He was a Judge of the Courts of Appeal of Jersey and Guernsey from 1972 to 1979.

== Judicial career ==
He became a Senator of the College of Justice in Scotland in 1979, taking the judicial courtesy title Lord Jauncey. Amongst other cases, he sat in two particularly long-running cases: McColl v. Strathclyde Regional Council [1983] SC 225, a 203-day hearing contesting the mandatory fluoridation of the water supply in Glasgow, and Santa Fe v. Heerama, a patent infringement case relating to semi-submersible drilling platforms in the North Sea which settled after 191 days in court. He held this post until 1988, when he became a Lord of Appeal in Ordinary. He was appointed to the Privy Council and was created a life peer with the title Baron Jauncey of Tullichettle, of Comrie in the District of Perth and Kinross. He also sat on the Judicial Committee of the Privy Council. He retired in 1996, but the Queen appointed him a special commissioner and arbitrator in 1998 to determine a dispute between the Dean of Westminster Abbey and its dismissed organist, Dr Martin Neary and Mrs Neary. He was chairman of the House of Lords Committee in 2001-2 that investigated the crash of the RAF Chinook helicopter ZD576 in the Mull of Kintyre in 1994 that killed all 29 on board. He continued to be active in the House of Lords after his retirement, until a stroke in November 2004. He twice caught MRSA while recuperating at Perth Royal Infirmary.

Outside the law, Jauncey became a member of the Royal Company of Archers in 1951. His interest in genealogy led to his appointment as Kintyre Pursuivant of Arms from 1955 to 1971. He was also a member of the Historic Buildings Council for Scotland from 1972 to 1992 and he was chairman of the influential Edinburgh conservation body the Cockburn Association from 1975 to 1978. He enjoyed fishing in the rivers of Perthshire. He lived in Tullichettle, near Comrie in Perthshire, for 60 years, and was a member of his local Episcopal church. He died in Comrie.

== Personal life ==
He married three times. He first married Jean Cunninghame Graham, daughter of Admiral Sir Angus Cunninghame Graham, in 1948. They had two sons, Jamie and Simon, and a daughter, Arabella. After their divorce in 1969, he married Elizabeth Ballingal, widow of Major John Ballingal, in 1973. After a second divorce in 1977, he married a third time, to Camilla Cathcart, daughter of Lieutenant-Colonel Charles Cathcart, later that year. They had one daughter, Cressida.

== In popular culture ==
In the 2021 mini-series A Very British Scandal, Jauncey was played by Richard Goulding.

== Arms ==
Coat of arms of Charles Jauncey, Baron Jauncey of Tullichettle
Crest An arm embowed in armour Argent holding in the gauntlet Or a battle-axe in fess also Argent the forearm environed of a wreath of laurel Vert. Escutcheon Or three chevronels engrailed Gules in chief two lions rampant and respectant of the second. Supporters Dexter a lion Gules gorged of a collar Or charged with a chevronel engrailed Gules, sinister a buck Proper attired collared and chained Or the collar charged with a chevronel engrailed Gules. Motto Virtute Majorum

Heraldic offices
Preceded by Iain Moncreiffe of that Ilk	Kintyre Pursuivant; 1955–1971	Succeeded by John Charles Grossmith George
