= Don Pottinger =

British artist (1919-1986)

John Inglis Drever "Don" Pottinger (1919–1986) was a Scottish officer of arms, artist, illustrator and author. He is remembered for the publication, with Sir Iain Moncreiffe, of Simple Heraldry, Cheerfully Illustrated (1953).

== Early life ==
Pottinger was born at Carnoustie, Angus in 1919. He was the second son of Reverend William Pottinger, and younger brother of William George Pottinger, known as George. He himself was known as Don from childhood because he was unable to pronounce his given name properly. He was educated at the High School of Dundee and received a scholarship to the Edinburgh College of Art in 1937.

His plans were interrupted by the outbreak of World War II in 1939. He served in the British Army throughout North Africa and Italy and ended his service in Palestine in 1946. During the war, he took time off to marry Fay Keeling.

After he was demobilized, Pottinger returned to his art studies in Edinburgh. In 1947 he won the Chalmer's Prize from the Royal Scottish Academy, and received his Diploma in Drawing and Painting in 1948. He completed an MA in Fine Arts in 1951 at the University of Edinburgh.

== Heraldic career ==
Pottinger's training led to a career in portrait painting, and he painted many of the most prominent people in Scotland during the 1950s. In 1949, he was commissioned to paint the official portrait of Lord Lyon King of Arms, Sir Thomas Innes of Learney.

During the sittings for the portrait, Pottinger was delighted by his conversations with Learney about the art of heraldry. This led to an appointment as a part-time herald painter at the Court of Lord Lyon King of Arms. Another result of this commission was Pottinger's meeting Sir Iain Moncreiffe of that Ilk and collaborating with him on the book Simple Heraldry, Cheerfully Illustrated (1953). This book was a best-seller and was reprinted three times in its first year. No small part of the success were Pottinger's "cheerful" illustrations.

In 1953 he was appointed as Linlithgow Pursuivant of Arms Extraordinary, as Unicorn Pursuivant of Arms in Ordinary in 1961 and Islay Herald of Arms in Ordinary in 1981. Also in 1981, he was appointed Lyon Clerk and Keeper of the Records at Lyon Court. Throughout his heraldic career, he continued to paint portraits and other works for a variety of clients.

In 1985, he was made an Honorary Senior Fellow of Renison University College, in Waterloo, Ontario, Canada, for his contributions to heraldry.

Pottinger remained Islay and Lyon Clerk until his death in 1986.

== Personal life ==
Don and Fay Pottinger lived in the New Town, Edinburgh. He was a member of the New Club.

== Pottinger's own arms ==
Coat of arms of Don Pottinger
Crest A raven wings elevated Sable gorged with a collar of three mullets Or. Escutcheon Sable three pelicans Or nests fretty of the First and Second within a bordure of the Second. Motto A Outrance

== Published works ==
- Moncreiffe, Sir Iain; Pottinger, Don (1953). Simple Heraldry Cheerfully Illustrated. London: Thomas Nelson & Sons Ltd.
- Moncreiffe, Sir Iain; Pottinger, Don (1954). Simple Custom Cheerfully Illustrated. London: Thomas Nelson & Sons Ltd.
- Moncreiffe, Sir Iain; Pottinger, Don (1956). Blood Royal Cheerfully Illustrated. London: Thomas Nelson & Sons Ltd.
- Moncreiffe, Sir Iain; Pottinger, Don (1985). Bartholomew's Clan Map of Scotland. Edinburgh: John Bartholomew and Son. ISBN 0851527329.
- Pottinger, Don (1976). Kings and Queens of Great Britain: Chart. London: Elm Tree Books. ISBN 0241894530.
- Pottinger, Don (1978). Tower of London. London: Elm Tree Books. ISBN 0241899303.
- Pottinger, Don; Cousins, Geoffrey (1974). Atlas of Golf. London: Thomas Nelson & Sons Ltd. ISBN 0171520092.
- Pottinger, Don; Grant, Michael (1958). Greeks. London: Thomas Nelson & Sons Ltd.
- Pottinger, Don; Grant, Michael (1960). Romans. London: Thomas Nelson & Sons Ltd.
- Pottinger, Don; Nicolson, Iain (1973). Simple Astronomy. New York: Charles Scribner's Sons. ISBN 0-684-13640-6.
- Norman, A.V.B.; Pottinger, Don (1966). Warrior to Soldier 449–1660 A brief introduction to the history of English warfare. London: Weidenfeld & Nicolson (Educational) Ltd.
- Norman, A.V.B.; Pottinger, Don (1994). The Medieval Soldier. New York: Barnes & Noble. ISBN 1566193818.

== See also ==
- Scottish Heraldry

== Sources ==
- Campbell, Ilay (2002). "Three Bookplates by Don Pottinger". The Double Tressure. 25: 72–6.

Heraldic offices
Preceded by Iain Moncreiffe of that Ilk	Falkland Pursuivant; 1953	Succeeded by David Boyle
Preceded by Gilbert Guthrie	Linlithgow Pursuivant; 1958–1961	Succeeded by Elizabeth Roads
Preceded by Iain Moncreiffe of that Ilk	Unicorn Pursuivant; 1961–1981	Succeeded by Crispin Agnew of Lochnaw
Preceded by Henry Wilson	Islay Herald; 1981–1986	Succeeded by Alastair Lorne Campbell of Airds
Preceded by Malcolm Innes of Edingight	Lyon Clerk and Keeper of the Records; 1981-1986	Succeeded by Elizabeth Roads
