= John George (officer of arms) =

British officer of arms (1930–2012)

John Charles Grossmith George (15 December 1930 – 20 May 2012) was a British officer of arms. He was educated at the Ampleforth College in England and began his career as Lieutenant in the Hertfordshire Yeomanry (RA, TA). He was with the College of Arms from 1963 to 1972 and was Earl Marshal's liaison officer with the funeral of Sir Winston Churchill 1965. He was a Green Staff Officer at the Investiture of Charles, Prince of Wales in 1969 and was Garioch Pursuivant to the Countess of Mar from 1976 to 1986. He was appointed Kintyre Pursuivant of Arms in Ordinary in 1986. He was then appointed Linlithgow Pursuivant Extraordinary in 2001 and retired in December 2005.

George was the son of Colonel Edward Harry George (1904–1957) and Rosa Mary Grossmith (1907–1988). He had two brothers: Timothy David George (born 1933) and Peter Michael Chrytall George (born 1935). His grandparents on his mother's side were the comic actor and impresario George Grossmith, Jr. and the actress Gertrude Elizabeth "Cissie" Rudge (1873–1951), whose stage name was Adelaide Astor. His great grandfather was the comedian, songwriter and Gilbert and Sullivan actor George Grossmith.

George was active in organizations concerning heraldry, insignia, flags, history, genealogy, astronomy and graphology and enjoyed sport. He was co-designer of the Royal Wedding Stamp (Crown Agents Issue) in 1981 and vice-president of the BBC Mastermind Club 1979–81. He also received many honours. He wrote The Puffin Book of Flags, published by Viking Children's Books (1978). He was also interested in musical comedy, in which his grandfather starred, and Gilbert and Sullivan, for whom his great-grandfather originated the famous "patter" roles. This interest led him to consult on the biography George Grossmith – Biography of a Savoyard (1982), by Tony Joseph, and on recordings of his great grandfather's comic songs by Leon Berger and Selwyn Tillett. George and his wife Margaret lived in Edinburgh from 1986 to 2005, when he retired. They lived in Spain for two years and then moved to North Yorkshire where he spent his last years.

== Notes ==
Heraldic offices
Preceded by Charles Jauncey	Kintyre Pursuivant; 1986-2001	Vacant
Preceded by Elizabeth Roads	Linlithgow Pursuivant; 2001–2005	Succeeded by Christopher Roads
