= The English Gentleman =

- First edition
- Author: Douglas Sutherland
- Language: English
- Genre: Satire, humour
- Publisher: The Viking Press
- Publication date: June 1978
- Publication place: England
- Media type: Print (hardback)
- Pages: 77
- ISBN: 978-0-670-29681-1

The English Gentleman (1978) is a humorous book written by Douglas Sutherland and illustrated by Timothy Jacques, with an introduction by Sir Iain Moncreiffe of that Ilk. The book acts as a satirical guide to the life of an English gentleman in various contexts, featuring such chapters as "The Gentleman at Play", "The Gentleman at War", and "The Gentleman and the Opposite Sex".

Each of the fourteen chapters gives tongue-in-cheek descriptions of the life of an English gentleman.

== See also ==
- A Practical Guide to Racism
