= Dingwall Pursuivant =

- The heraldic badge of Dingwall Pursuivant of Arms
- Heraldic tradition: Gallo-British
- Jurisdiction: Scotland
- Governing body: Court of the Lord Lyon

Dingwall Pursuivant of Arms is a current Scottish pursuivant of arms of the Court of the Lord Lyon.

Dingwall Pursuivant was formerly a private officer of arms in the service of the Lord of the Isles, but along with Kintyre Pursuivant, Ross Herald, and Islay Herald became an officer of arms to the Scottish Crown when the Lord of the Isles forfeited his estates and titles to James IV of Scotland in 1493.

The badge of office is A mullet within an annulet rayonnee Or and enfiled in chief of a coronet of four fleurs-de-lys (two visible) and four crosses pattee (one and two halves visible) Or.

The office is currently vacant.

== Holders of the office ==
Arms	Name	Date of appointment	Ref
	James Aikman	1460	
	David Blyth	1580	
	David Spens	1545	
	Sir David Lindsay of Rathillet	1545	
	John Brown	1565	
	William Henderson	1566	
	John Purdy	1590	
	Daniel Graham	1596	
	John Yellowlees	1603	
	Gilbert Hunter	1617	
	Alexander Murray	1661	
	Robert Knox	1668	
	James Dunbar	1675	
	James Guthrie	1682	
	David Auchmouty of Drummeldrie	1712	
	William Gray	1718	
	Hugh Spark	1747	
	William Gordon of Craig and Holm	1761	
	James Mitchell	1774	
	Robert Thomson	1795	
	David Alexander	1823	
	Alexander MacCulloch Anderson	1828	
	John Neill	1830	
	Samuel Bough	1864–1878	
	Vacant	1878–1939	
	Major Charles Ian Fraser of Reelig	1939–1953	
	Vacant	1953–1983	
	Charles John Burnett	1983–1988	
	Vacant	1988–2011	
	Yvonne Holton	2011–2021	
	Vacant	2021–Present	

== See also ==
- Officer of Arms
- Pursuivant
- Court of the Lord Lyon
- Heraldry Society of Scotland
