= Lord High Constable of Scotland =

Hereditary ceremonial office in Scotland

- The Royal Coat of Arms of Scotland

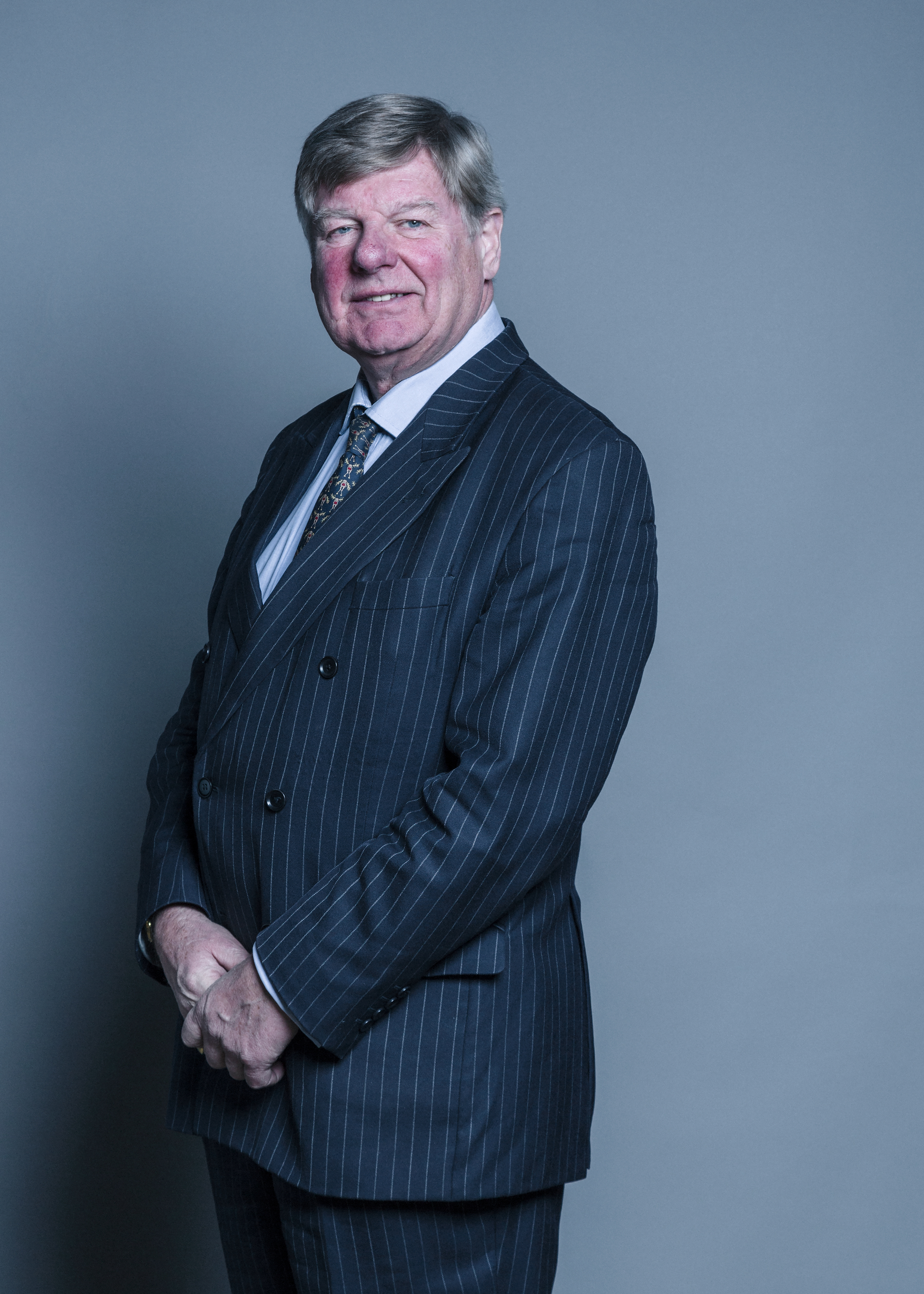
- Incumbent; Merlin Hay, 24th Earl of Erroll since 16 May 1978
- Style: The Earl of Errol, Lord High Constable of Scotland
- Succession: Hereditary

The Lord High Constable is a hereditary, now ceremonial, office of Scotland. In the order of precedence of Scotland, the office traditionally ranks above all titles except those of the royal family. The Lord High Constable was, after the King of Scots, the supreme officer of the Scottish army. He also performed judicial functions as the chief judge of the High Court of Constabulary. From the late 13th Century the Court – presided over by the Lord High Constable or his deputies – was empowered to judge all cases of rioting, disorder, bloodshed and murder if such crimes occurred within four miles of the King, the King's Council, or the Parliament of Scotland. Following James VI's move to England, the jurisdiction of the Lord High Constable was defined in terms of the "resident place" appointed for the Council.

The Constable historically also commanded the Doorward Guard of Partizans, the oldest bodyguard in Britain. The Constable also held several honorific privileges, such as the right to sit on the right side of the King when he attended Parliament, custody of the keys to Parliament House, the ceremonial command of the King's bodyguards, and precedence above all Scotsmen except the members of the royal family and the Lord Chancellor of Scotland. Most of the powers, however, disappeared when Scotland and England combined into Great Britain under the Act of Union 1707. The office, nonetheless, continues as a ceremonial one.

The office became hereditary in the 12th Century and was held by the Comyn family, but they ended up on the wrong side in the Wars of Scottish Independence. Since then it has been held by the Hays of Erroll, later Earls of Erroll. The first was Gilbert Hay, who was given the office by Robert the Bruce, followed by David Hay.

The Constable and the Duke of Hamilton (as Lord of Abernethy) may sit as assessors to the Lord Lyon King of Arms. The Earl of Erroll, Lord High Constable, is one of four peers entitled to appoint a private pursuivant, with the title of Slains Pursuivant of Arms.

In 1952, the Court of Claims allowed the right of the Countess of Erroll, as Lord High Constable, to be present by deputy at the coronation of Queen Elizabeth II. The present holder (2021) is Merlin Hay, 24th Earl of Erroll.

== Hundred Years War ==
During the Hundred Years War, a significant amount of Scottish soldiery served in France. These troops served under their own commanders and were quite distinct from their French allies. In order to keep the command structure of the enlarged allied forces intact, the French King appointed a High Constable of the Scots Army, more commonly known as the Constable of Scotland. Perhaps the most celebrated of these men was John Stewart, 2nd Earl of Buchan, who latterly was also created Constable of France.

== Constables (incomplete) ==
- c. 1114–c. 1138, Edward Siwardsson to King David I
- 1138–1162, Hugh de Morville, to King David I (father of Hugh de Morville, Lord of Westmorland an assassin of Thomas Becket)
- 1162–1189, Richard de Morville, his son, to King Malcolm IV
- 1189–1200, Lochlann of Galloway, his son-in-law, husband of Richard de Morville's daughter Helena, Constable to King William the Lion.
- 1200–1234, Alan of Galloway (son of Helena de Morville), to King Alexander II
- 1234–1265, Roger de Quincy, 2nd Earl of Winchester (married to a daughter of Alan of Galloway)
- c. 1265–c. 1286, Sir Leonard Leslie, to King Alexander III
- 1275–1289, Alexander Comyn, Earl of Buchan.
- 1289–?, John Comyn, Earl of Buchan
- 1311, David II Strathbogie, Earl of Atholl, forfeited.
- 1309–1333, Gilbert de la Hay from 1309, made Heritable Constable in 1314 by Robert the Bruce, following the Battle of Bannockburn.
- 1333, Henry de Beaumont, to Edward Balliol.
- 1333–1346, David de la Hay, grandson of Gilbert de la Hay
- 1346–1406, Thomas de la Hay, son of David de la Hay
- 1406–1437, William de la Hay, son of Thomas de la Hay
- see Earl of Erroll for subsequent holders of the office

== See also ==
- Great Officer of State
- Lord High Constable of England
