= Francis James Grant =

Scottish officer of arms

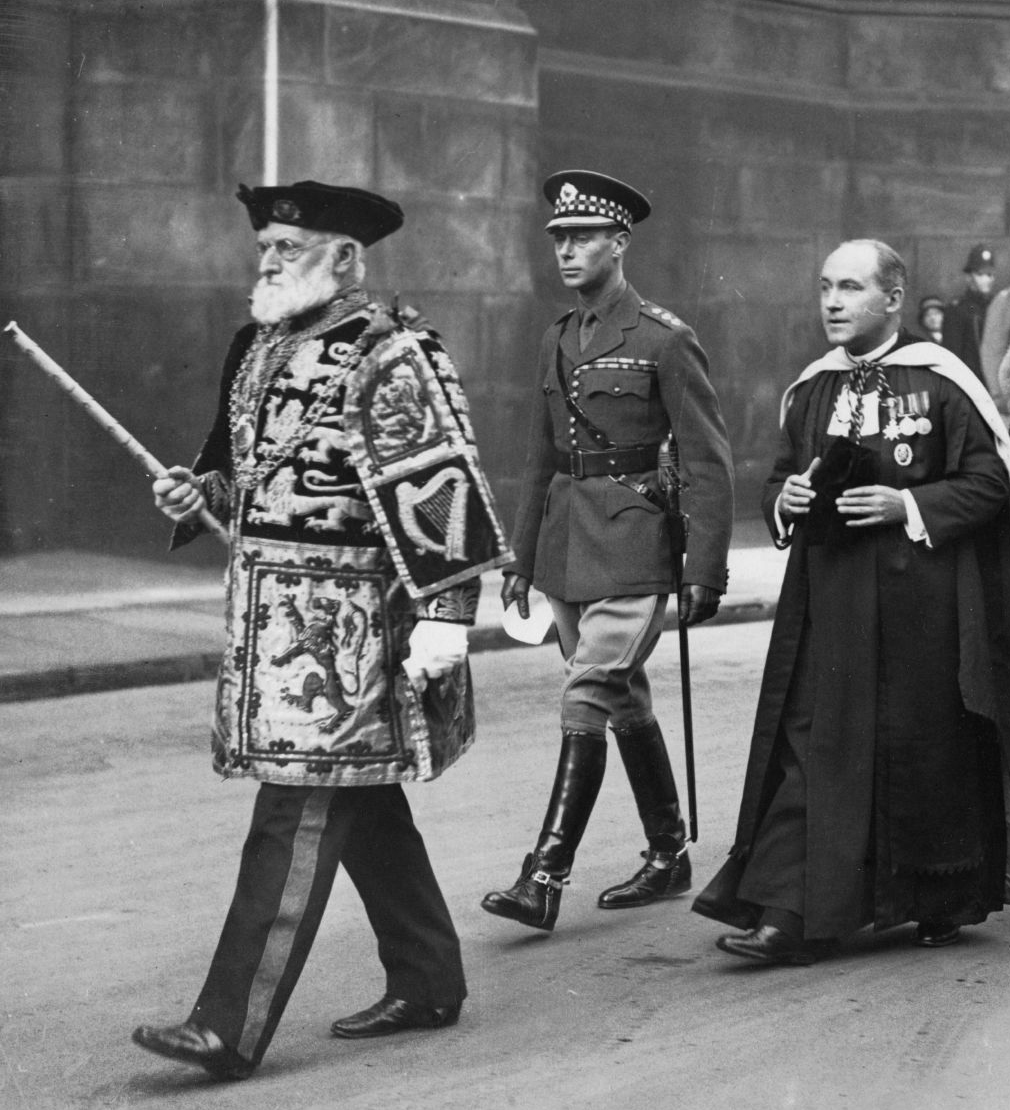
Sir Francis Grant, Lord Lyon King of Arms, shown accompanying the Duke of York, and the Reverend Charles Warr, DD, Dean of the Thistle, proceeding to the Armistice Service at St. Giles Cathedral, Edinburgh, in 1933.

Sir Francis James Grant KCVO WS (1863–1953) was a Scottish officer of arms who eventually rose to the office of Lord Lyon King of Arms. Grant served in the Court of the Lord Lyon as Carrick Pursuivant of Arms in Ordinary beginning on 17 May 1886. This appointment lasted until his promotion to the office of Rothesay Herald of Arms in Ordinary and Lyon Clerk and Keeper of the Records on 8 September 1898.

On 10 May 1929, he was appointed Lord Lyon King of Arms and Secretary of the Order of the Thistle. He was made a Knight Commander of the Royal Victorian Order in 1935. Grant retired from the office on 30 June 1945. He was the representative of Grant of Corrimony, and was the son of John Grant, Marchmont Herald of Arms in Ordinary from 1884 to 1888.

He was elected a Fellow of the American Society of Genealogists in 1944.

== Arms ==
Coat of arms of Sir Francis James Grant
Escutcheon Gules three antique crowns Or within a bordure chequy of the last and first charged with three crescent Azure.

== See also ==
- King of Arms
- Heraldry
- Pursuivant
- Herald

Heraldic offices
Preceded by James William Mitchell	Lyon Clerk and Keeper of the Records; 1898-1929	Succeeded by Harold Andrew Balvaird Lawson
Preceded by George Swinton	Lord Lyon King of Arms; 1929–1945	Succeeded by Sir Thomas Innes of Learney
