= Moncreiffe Hill =

Coordinates: 56.36348°N 3.40171°W

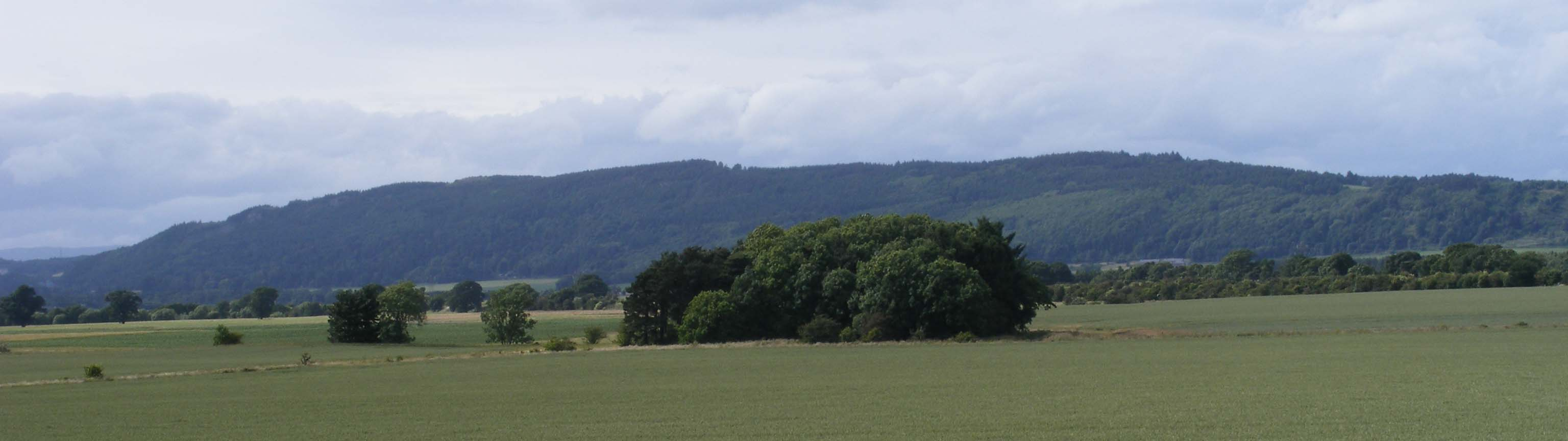
- Moncreiffe Hill from the south east

Highest point
- Elevation: 223 m (732 ft)
- Prominence: 186 m (610 ft)
- Listing: Marilyn

Geography
- Location within Scotland
- Location: Perth, Scotland
- Parent range: none, stands alone
- OS grid: NO135199
- Topo map: OS Landranger 58

Moncreiffe Hill (also known as Moredun Hill) is a long, wooded ridge that lies south of Perth, Scotland. It can be easily seen on the right during the final stages of the drive north towards Perth on the M90 motorway. Unlike most Scottish hills, the routes to the summit are almost entirely under tree cover, although the summit area, which is known as Moredun Top, is clear and offers views over Perth and the River Tay.

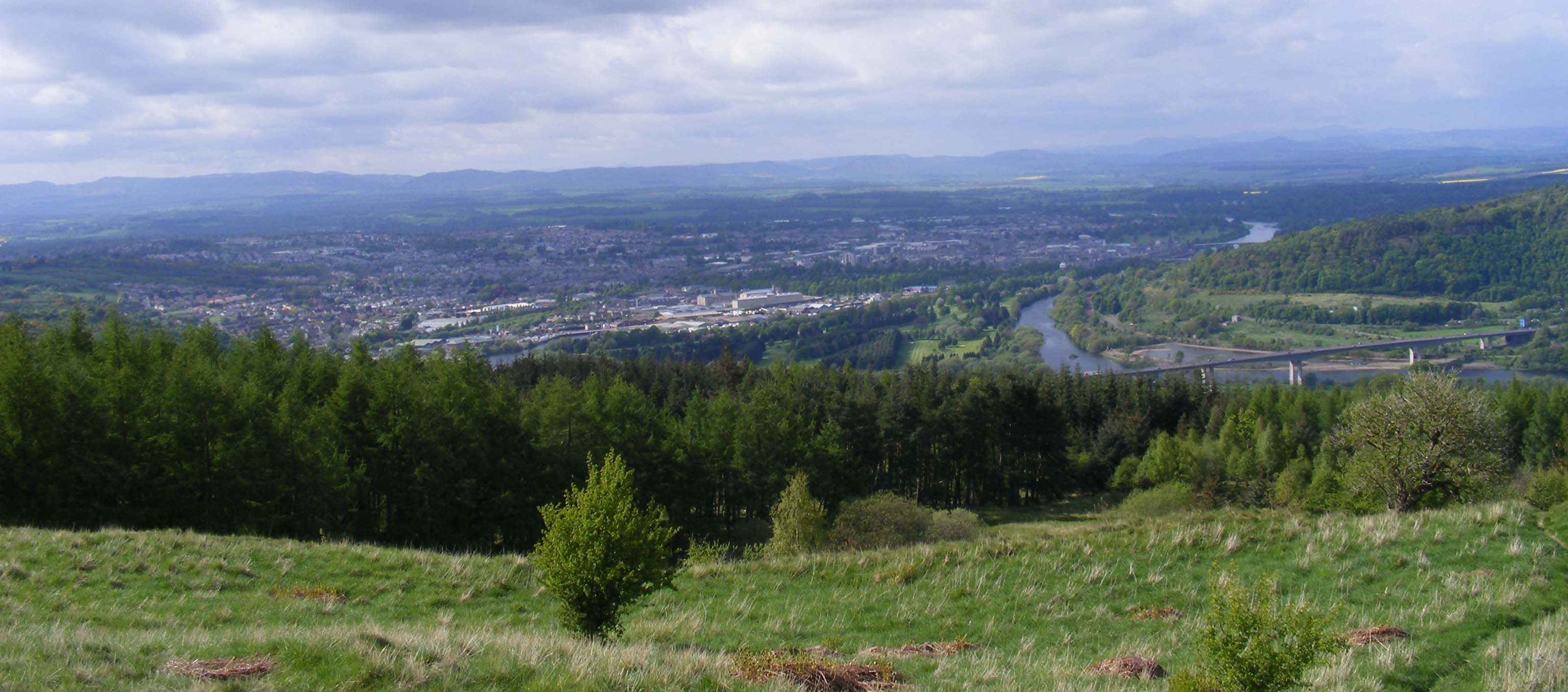
View over Perth from the summit

The shortest route to the summit is from the north, starting at the car park at NO138209. Another route to the summit, albeit a longer route, starts from the south east, starting at NO153192, which is signposted from the nearest public road and where there is sufficient parking space.

A wide variety of trees and other vegetation grow on the hill, which is managed by the Woodland Trust Scotland. There are information boards and several marked trails.

Wood was harvested at Moncreiffe to mount the cannons of Mary, Queen of Scots, in 1565.
