= Public Register of All Arms and Bearings in Scotland =

Official register of Scottish coats of arms

The Public Register of All Arms and Bearings in Scotland, established in 1672, is an official register of Scottish coats of arms maintained by the Lyon Clerk and Keeper of the Records. As a public register, it can be seen by anyone on application, and on payment of a statutory fee.

== History ==
The Register was established by Act of the Scottish Parliament in 1672. It is held at the Court of the Lord Lyon, and contains every grant of arms by Lord Lyon King of Arms since that date, as well as older coats of arms that the owners have chosen to register. Bearings that are not matriculated in the Register may not be used in Scotland, unless it can be proved that they were in use before 1672.

The first volume of the Register (now divided into two parts for ease of handling and conservation reasons) continued in use from 1672 until 1804, and contains 2,702 entries. It begins with the arms of the Lyon Office, followed by the personal achievement of Sir Charles Erskine, Bt, who was Lord Lyon at the time. Most of the arms in this volume are given in blazon only: relatively few are painted.

From the beginning of the second volume in 1804 the arms are consistently painted. The Register now consists of over eighty volumes of parchment, and is illustrated by a succession of the most prominent heraldic artists working in Scotland.

== Published ordinaries ==
In 1893, Sir James Balfour Paul, Lord Lyon King of Arms, published the contents of the first twelve volumes of the Register, to that date, in the form of an ordinary (i.e. with the entries in blazon, rearranged by design; and with a name index): the work contained roughly 5,200 entries. Ten years later, by which time the Register had reached its sixteenth volume, he published an updated second edition including all arms registered to the end of 1901: this edition contained 5,532 entries. By 1973 the Register had reached its 57th volume, and in 1977 Lyon Office published a second volume of the Ordinary: this covered all arms registered from 1902 to the end of 1973, and contained a further 6,040 entries. This volume was edited by David Reid of Robertland, Carrick Pursuivant (who died in December 1973, while the work was in progress), and Vivien Wilson.

The three published volumes are therefore:

- Paul, Sir James Balfour (1893). An Ordinary of Arms contained in the Public Register of all Arms and Bearings in Scotland. Edinburgh: William Green & Sons.
- Paul, Sir James Balfour (1903). An Ordinary of Arms contained in the Public Register of all Arms and Bearings in Scotland (2nd ed.). Edinburgh: William Green & Sons.
- Reid, David; Wilson, Vivien, eds. (1977). An Ordinary of Arms contained in the Public Register of all Arms and Bearings in Scotland, 1902–1973. Vol. 2. Edinburgh: HMSO. ISBN 9780950529905.
- Durie, Bruce (2023) An Ordinary Volume III is now available, of Arms contained in the Public Register of All Arms and Bearings in Scotland, covering 1971-2017: Vol. 55 (1971) to Vol. 91 (2017) and part of Vol. 92, Compiled, and with an Introduction and other material, by Dr. Bruce Durie and with a Foreword by The Rt. Hon. The Lord Lyon, The Revd. Canon Dr. Joseph John Morrow. There is also a Companion to the Ordinary of Arms vol III compiled by Dr Bruce Durie, dedicated to Crests, Mottos, Supporters, Flags and Badges associated with the Arms in the Ordinary Volume III along with informative essays and other material, and a Foreword by the noted Scots heraldist, Mark Dennis.

== Digitisation ==
The Register down to 1923 has been digitised, and is available on the ScotlandsPeople Website (maintained by the National Records of Scotland). Searching the index is free, but there is a fee to view the page images.

== See also ==
- Heraldry
- The Court of the Lord Lyon
- Lyon Clerk and Keeper of the Records
- The Heraldry Society of Scotland
