= Charles Burnett (officer of arms) =

Scottish antiquarian and officer of arms

Charles John Burnett (6 November 1940 – 23 February 2024) was a Scottish antiquarian and officer of arms.

== Biography ==
Burnett was born on 6 November 1940 and educated at Gray's School of Art in Aberdeen, and the University of Edinburgh.

He worked for a number of museums, including: Letchworth Museum, the National Museum of Antiquities of Scotland, the Scottish United Services Museum at Edinburgh Castle, and Duff House, Banff

Burnett was appointed Dingwall Pursuivant of Arms in Ordinary in 1983 and promoted to Ross Herald of Arms in Ordinary in 1988. He retired as an officer of arms in ordinary in 2010 and was appointed Ross Herald Extraordinary for a period of five years, demitting office on 31 December 2015. His 1992 M.Litt thesis at the University of Edinburgh was entitled The Officers of Arms and heraldic art under King James Sixth & First 1567-1625. He was also the president of the Heraldry Society of Scotland.

Burnett died on 23 February 2024, at the age of 83.

== Publications ==
- 'Outward Signs of Majesty, 1535–1540', Janet Hadley Williams, Stewart Style, 1513–1542 (Tuckwell, 1996), pp. 282–302

== Arms ==
Coat of arms of Charles Burnett
Escutcheon Per chevron Azure and Argent in chief a holly leaf between two pens in base a hunting horn stringed contournée all counter-changed.

Heraldic offices
Preceded by Charles Ian Fraser	Dingwall Pursuivant; 1983-1988	Succeeded by Yvonne Holton
Preceded by Andrew Monro Ross	Ross Herald; 1988–2015	Succeeded by Mark Dennis
