= Merlin Hay, 24th Earl of Erroll =

British nobleman (born 1948)

Colonel The Right Honourable The Earl of Erroll
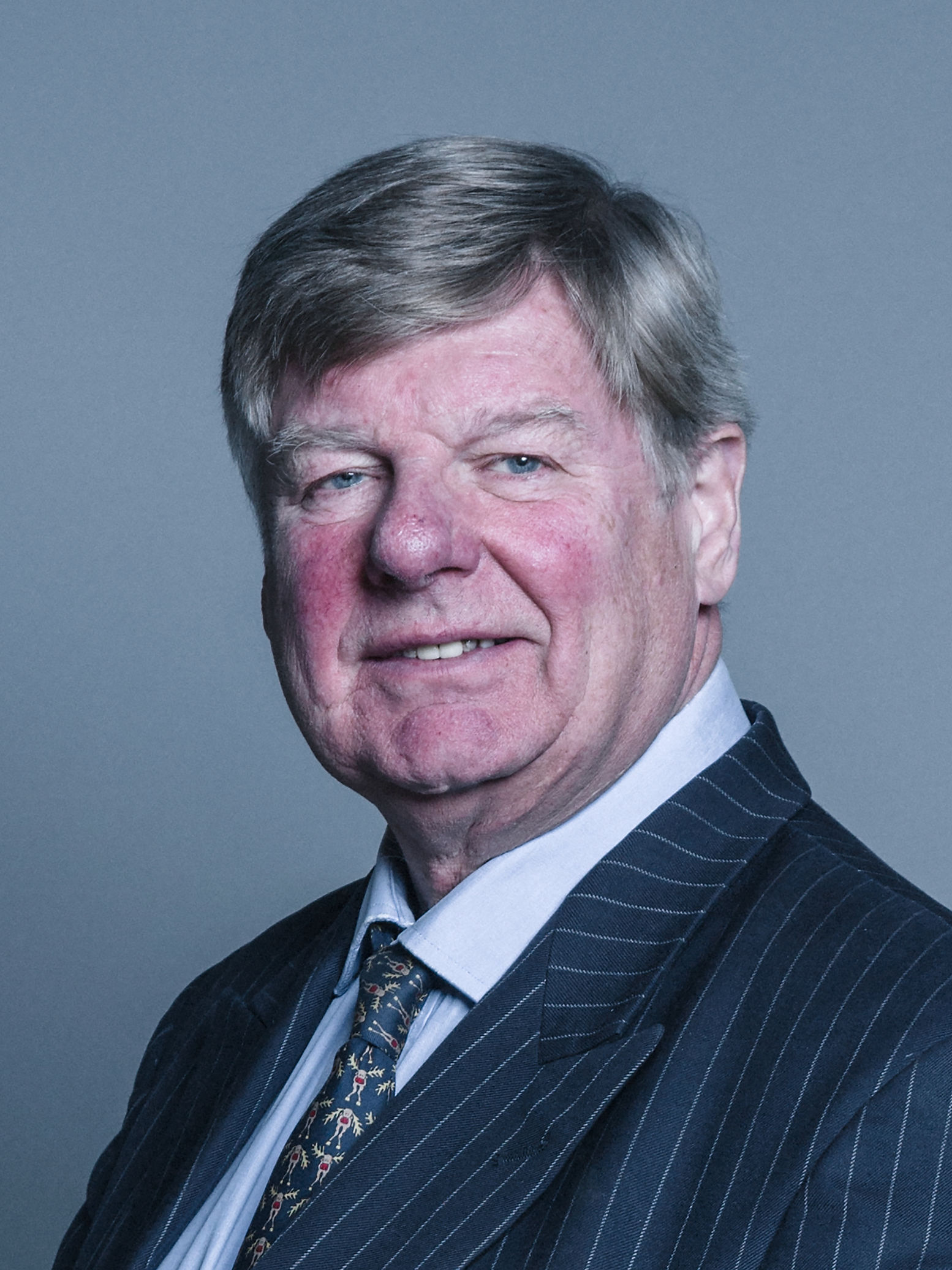
- Official portrait, 2018

Member of the House of Lords
- Lord Temporal
- Hereditary peerage 30 June 1978 – 11 November 1999
- Preceded by: The 23rd Countess of Erroll
- Succeeded by: Seat abolished
- Elected Hereditary Peer; 11 November 1999 – 29 April 2026
- Election: 1999
- Preceded by: Seat established
- Succeeded by: Seat abolished

Lord High Constable of Scotland Chief of Clan Hay
- Incumbent
- Assumed office 16 May 1978
- Preceded by: The 23rd Countess of Erroll

Personal details
- Born: Merlin Sereld Victor Gilbert Hay; 20 April 1948 (age 78)
- Spouse: Isabelle Astell (m. 1982; died 2020)
- Children: 4
- Parents: Sir Iain Moncreiffe, 11th Bt (father); Diana Hay, 23rd Countess of Erroll (mother)
- Occupation: Programmer

Merlin Sereld Victor Gilbert Hay, 24th Earl of Erroll (born 20 April 1948), is a British aristocrat, chief of the Scottish clan Hay, and hereditary Lord High Constable of Scotland. He was, as a hereditary peer, a crossbench member of the House of Lords until the entry into force of the House of Lords (Hereditary Peers) Act 2026.

== Early life and education ==
Lord Erroll, elder son of Diana Hay, 23rd Countess of Erroll and Sir Iain Moncreiffe of that Ilk, was a Page to the Lord Lyon in 1956. He was educated at Eton College before going up to Trinity College, Cambridge.

== Earl of Erroll ==
Succeeding his mother, the Countess, in 1978 as Earl of Erroll, and in 1985, his father as a baronet, Lord Erroll now serves as a member of the Council of the Hereditary Peerage Association. Whilst Lord Erroll inherited Chieftainship of Clan Hay via his mother, their father's Chieftainship of Clan Moncreiffe devolved to his younger brother Peregrine.

== Marriage and family ==
He married Isabelle Jacqueline Laline Astell Hohler (b. Brussels, 22 August 1955 – 13 January 2020), daughter of Major Thomas Sidney Hohler and his wife, heiress to the Astell family, of Everton House, Bedfordshire, in 1982. The Countess was a Patroness of the Royal Caledonian Ball and served as High Sheriff of Bedfordshire in 2015.

The Earl and Countess had two sons and two daughters:

- Harry Thomas William Hay, Lord Hay (b. Basingstoke, 8 August 1984); married Clementine Camilla Curtis Travis in 2017.
- Hon. Amelia Diana Jacqueline Hay (b. Basingstoke, 23 November 1986)
- Hon. Laline Lucy Clementine Hay (b. Basingstoke, 21 December 1987); married Major Jeremy Sudlow in 2017.
- Hon. Richard Merlin Iain Astell (b. Basingstoke, 14 December 1990); took the surname "Astell" by Royal Licence in 2015.

== Military and business career ==
The Earl of Erroll became a Lieutenant of the Atholl Highlanders since 1974, and is a Member of the Royal Company of Archers. He served in the 21st SAS Artists Rifles (V) Territorial Army from 1975 to 1990, and was an Honorary Colonel of the Royal Military Police (Territorial Army) from 1992 to 1997.

Lord Erroll has worked as a marketing and computer consultant, is a Freeman of the City of London, and Prime Warden of the Worshipful Company of Fishmongers (2000–01). He continues to head the Puffin's Club, founded by his father. He is President of ERADAR, an e-business consultancy, and is President of the Digital Policy Alliance (EURIM).

He was a director of LASSeO, a not-for-profit technical standardization and interoperability membership organisation for smartcard technologies.

== Politics ==
Lord Erroll was one of 90 excepted hereditary peers elected to remain in the House of Lords following the House of Lords Act 1999. A programmer and system designer by trade, he sat as a crossbencher and usually spoke on matters relating to cybersecurity and information technology. He was a member of the Science and Technology Committee and criticised Gordon Brown's government for what he said was a failure to curb cybercrime after four government agencies, including the Ministry of Defence and HM Revenue and Customs, reported massive losses of data in 2008. Most recently he was a member of the Information Committee from 2007 to 2012.

Lord Erroll served as Lord High Constable of Scotland at the coronation of King Charles III and Queen Camilla in 2023. He ceased to be a member of the House of Lords on 29 April 2026 as a result of the passage of the House of Lords (Hereditary Peers) Act 2026.

== See also ==
- Earl of Erroll

Peerage of Scotland
Preceded by Diana Hay; Countess of Erroll	Earl of Erroll; 1978–present Member of the House of Lords (1978–1999)	Incumbent; Heir apparent: Lord Hay
Parliament of the United Kingdom
New office created by the House of Lords Act 1999	Elected hereditary peer to the House of Lords under the House of Lords Act 1999; 1999–2026	Office abolished under the House of Lords (Hereditary Peers) Act 2026
Baronetage of Nova Scotia
Preceded by Sir Iain Moncreiffe	12th Baronet (of Moncreiffe); 1985–present	Incumbent; Heir apparent: Lord Hay
