= Douglas Sutherland =

British writer (1919–1995)

Douglas Chalmers Hutchinson Sutherland MC (18 November 1919 – 28 August 1995) was a British soldier, author and journalist, best known for his biographies and the humorous English Gentleman books.

== Background ==
Sutherland was born in 1919 at Bongate Hall, Appleby-in-Westmorland, Cumbria, England; he always joked that the error of judgement in his not being born in Scotland was compensated for a year later by his family's moving to live in the remote island of Stronsay in Orkney. The family later moved to Aberdeenshire, and Sutherland followed his elder brother to Trinity College, Glenalmond. He joined the army in 1938 as a Private with the King's Own Scottish Borderers, though Sutherland was later commissioned into the King's (Liverpool) Regiment, and saw active service during the Second World War, for which he was awarded the Military Cross and George Cross, twice being mentioned in Despatches. In 1945, he was posted to Second Lieutenant Sir Bernard Montgomery's 21st Army Group Headquarters at Bad Oeynhausen, where he joined the Allied Liaison Branch, and was an observer at the Nuremberg Trials.

== Career ==
Returning to London, Sutherland would observe that his first challenge as a civilian was sartorial. To this end, he was helped by Oscar Hammerstein, the American lyricist, who was a friend of his first wife Moyra Fraser, then a ballet dancer. Hammerstein presented him with his cast-off suits, and thus attired, he began working as a journalist for the Evening Standard, and later, the Daily Express.

Sutherland's life during this period is affectionately depicted in Portrait of a Decade, where he recalls many of the colourful characters of 1950s London, centred on Muriel Belcher's famous Colony Room in Dean Street, Soho. However, he is best remembered for his best-selling humour series which began with The English Gentleman, and was followed by The English Gentleman's Wife/Child/Mistress, and The English Gentleman Abroad.

A more serious side to his writing included biographies, including those of the sporting Earl of Lonsdale (The Yellow Earl), and Fraud with Jon Connell, founder of The Week magazine, the life of the international fraudster Emil Savundra, which won the Crime Writer's Silver Dagger Award for the best non-fiction crime book of the year.

In 1963, with Anthony Purdy, he published a book on the notorious spy ring of the 1950s, Burgess and Maclean. Prior to its publication it was rumoured that pressure to withdraw some of the book's most controversial content was placed on the authors from the British establishment, and that Sutherland and Purdy were obliged to suppress their information for reasons of national security. After Anthony Blunt's exposure some twenty years later, Sutherland immediately released The Fourth Man, the first full uncensored account of the intrigue.

Having married three times, Sutherland settled in Scotland with his third wife Diana. His latter years were marred by ill health and a dispute over the publishing royalties of the English Gentleman series, and he died at South Queensferry on 28 August 1995 aged 75. His children include Carol Thomas, architect Charlie Sutherland, choreographer James Sutherland, Comedian Joanna (Jojo) Sutherland and curator Adam Sutherland, director of Grizedale Arts.

== Books ==
- The Yellow Earl: The Life of Hugh Lowther, 5th Earl of Lonsdale, Cassell, 1965.
- Against the Wind: An Orkney Idyll, Heinemann, 1966.
- Rohallion: Wild Life in a Scottish Home, Heinemann, 1978.
- Sutherland's War, Leo Cooper, 1984.
- Portrait of a Decade: London Life 1945-1955, Harrap, 1988.
- Born Yesterday: Memories of a Scottish Childhood, Canongate, 1992.
