= Linlithgow Pursuivant =

Element of Scottish heraldry

- The heraldic badge of Linlithgow Pursuivant of Arms
- Heraldic tradition: Gallo-British
- Jurisdiction: Scotland
- Governing body: Court of the Lord Lyon

Linlithgow Pursuivant of Arms is a Scottish pursuivant of arms of the Court of the Lord Lyon.

This title is locative in origin, and is derived from the name of a royal burgh of Linlithgow and palace of the same name. The title is often used for a Pursuivant Extraordinary.

The badge of office is A greyhound bitch passant Sable ensigned of a coronet of four fleur de lys (two visible) and four crosses pattee (one and two halves visible) Or.

The office is currently vacant and was last held by Professor Gillian Black. As Linlithgow Pursuivant Black took part in the Royal Procession at the 2023 Coronation.

== Holders of the office ==
Arms	Name	Dates of tenure	Ref
	Gilbert Guthrie	1572	
	John Inglis Drever "Don" Pottinger	1953 (in Extraordinary)	
	Elizabeth Ann Roads	1987 (temporary appointment)	
	John Charles Grossmith George	2001–2005 (in Extraordinary)	
	Christopher Roads	2012 (in Extraordinary)	
	Liam Devlin	2014–2016 (in Extraordinary)	
	John Stirling	2016–2021 (in Extraordinary)	
	Professor Gillian Black	2021–2024 (in Extraordinary)	

== See also ==
- Officer of Arms
- Pursuivant
- Court of the Lord Lyon
- Heraldry Society of Scotland
