= Ross Herald =

- The heraldic badge of Ross Herald of Arms
- Heraldic tradition: Gallo-British
- Jurisdiction: Scotland
- Governing body: Court of the Lord Lyon

Ross Herald of Arms Extraordinary is a Scottish herald of arms Extraordinary of the Court of the Lord Lyon. The office is however held in Extraordinary after the retirement of the last holder in Ordinary.

The title of the office is derived from the Earldom of Ross. The title was first used in 1475.

The Ross Herald in 1687, Henry Fraser was a heraldic painter who apprenticed under George Porteous. He was responsible for genealogical research and the designing and painting of coats of arms. There is mention of him in the Gordon papers of 24 December 1716 "Account due to Henry Fraser, Ross Herald, for paintings done for funeral of George, 1st duke of Gordon: lozenge arms, mort heads, branches for the coffin, a helmet and ducal crown, etc., and other work in the Citadel of Leith." He was also mentioned by Alexander Nisbet in his book A System of Heraldry, Speculative & Practical written in 1712 but not published until 1722 in Edinburgh. "James Workman's Illuminated Book of Arms, who was Herald in the reign of James VI, which book I frequently refer to... which book I had from the ingenious Mr. Henry Fraser, Ross Herald...." Mr. Fraser died 15 January 1724 and is buried b. 17 North Corner Naismith Tomb in Greyfriars Churchyard. The office was held until his death.

The badge of office is Two lions rampant Argent armed and langued Azure supporting a baton paleways Sable, the tips Or ensigned of the Crown of Scotland Proper.

The office is currently held by John Stirling.

== Holders of the office ==
Arms	Name	Date of appointment	Ref
	... (Diligens)	1476	
	John Dickson	1517	
	Sir Robert Forman of Luthrie	1540	
	Robert Hart	1546	
	Alexander Ross	1558	
	Sir William Stewart	1565	
	Patrick Davidson	1567	
	John Purdy	1593	
	Andrew Littlejohn	1596	
	Adam Matheson	1599	
	Thomas Williamson of Mylnehill	1616	
	Thomas Hunter	1625	
	John Malcolm	1630	
	Andrew Littlejohn	1646	
	Joseph Stacey	1663	
	Henry Fraser	1687	
	Roderick Chalmers	1724	
	John Toulon (or Teulon)	1746	
	Thomas Husband	1756	
	Patric Bennet of Whiteside	1816	
	David Taylor	1825	
	George Goldie	1836	
	Andrew Gilman	1860	
	Vacant	1879–1901	
	Andrew Monro Ross	1901–1925	
	Vacant	1925–1988	
	Charles John Burnett (Office used in Extraordinary from 2011)	1988–2015	
	Vacant	2015–2017	
	Mark D. Dennis (Office used in Extraordinary)	2017–2020	
	Vacant	2020–2024	
	John Stirling, WS	2024–Present	

== See also ==
- Officer of Arms
- Herald
- Court of the Lord Lyon
- Heraldry Society of Scotland
