= Finlaggan Pursuivant =

Officer of arms for Clan Donald

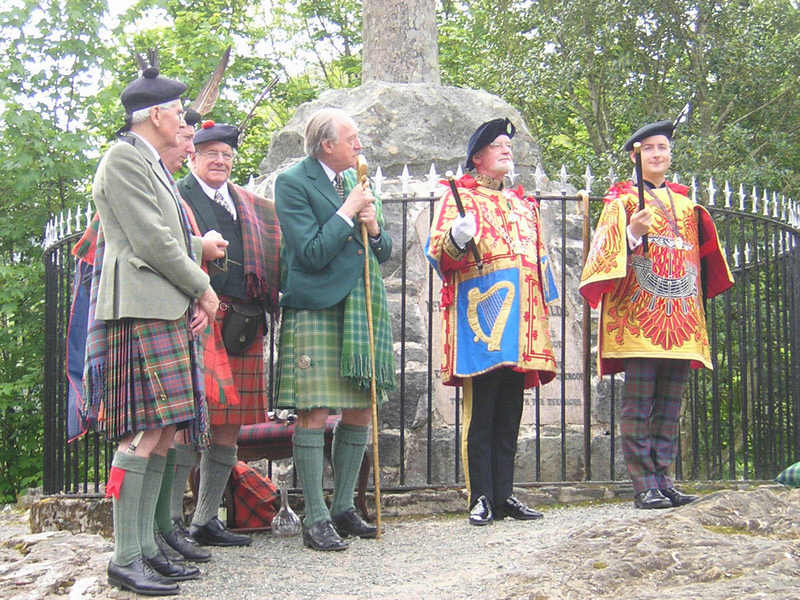
Adam Bruce at his installation as Finlaggan Pursuivant of Arms of Clan Donald. Finlaggan wears a tabard emblazoned with the arms of his employer, the Chief of Clan Donald. The four participating chiefs are to the left.

Finlaggan Pursuivant of Arms is the private officer of arms of the Clan Donald in Scotland.

The office of Finlaggan Pursuivant is held by Thomas Miers, who was appointed at a ceremony in Edinburgh on 25 July 2009. Miers succeeded Adam Bruce (b. 1968) following his appointment as Unicorn Pursuivant. Bruce was appointed by Godfrey James Macdonald, 8th Baron Macdonald of Slate, Chief of the Name and Arms of Macdonald and High Chief of Clan Donald. This post was revived in 2005, after 510 years, in a ceremony attended by Ross Herald of Arms in Ordinary from the Court of the Lord Lyon and the four MacDonald chiefs.

The heraldic title comes from Finlaggan, near Port Askaig in Islay, the centre of the realm of the Macdonald Lords of the Isles until they lost power in 1493.

Bruce's installation as Finlaggan marks the revival of the ancient practice of senior clan chiefs having their own private pursuivants to look after matters of clan heraldry and genealogy. Finlaggan joins that of Slains Pursuivant to the Earl of Erroll, Garioch Pursuivant to the Countess of Mar and Endure Pursuivant of the Earl of Crawford and Balcarres.

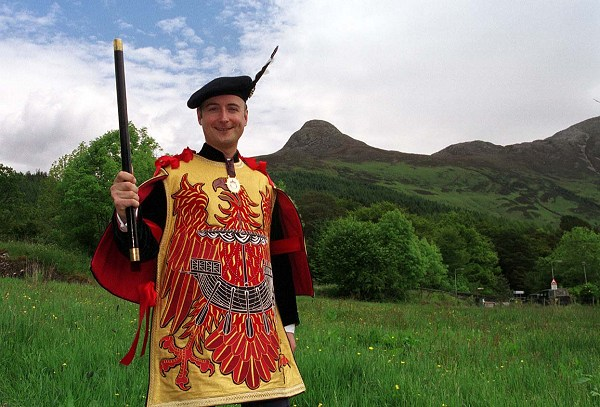
Adam Bruce, former Finlaggan Pursuivant of Arms

== See also ==
- Officer of Arms
- Heraldry
- Pursuivant
