= Peter Drummond-Murray of Mastrick =

Scottish herald, Private Officer of Arms, stockbroker and banker

Peter Drummond-Murray of Mastrick KStJ
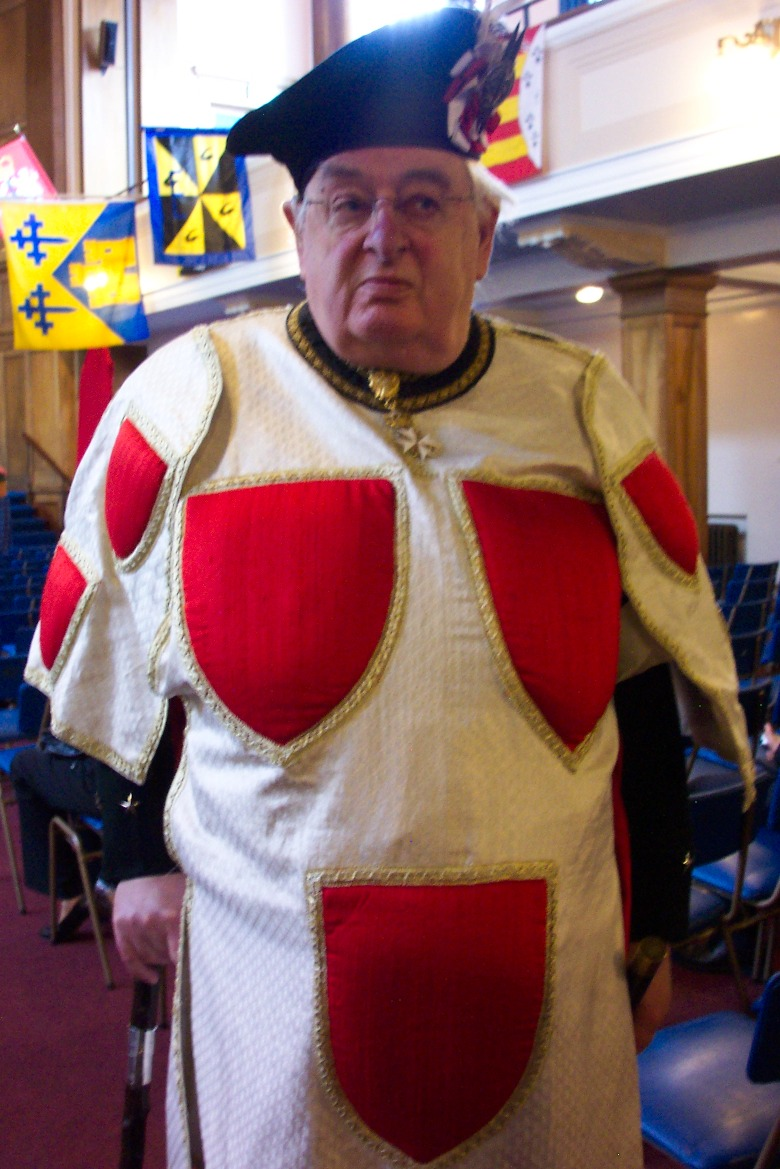
- Peter Drummond-Murray of Mastrick at the 2006 International Congress of Genealogical and Heraldic Sciences. He is shown wearing the tabard of the arms of the Earl of Erroll.
- Born: 24 November 1929
- Died: 13 April 2014 (aged 84); Edinburgh, Scotland
- Occupations: banker, herald
- Known for: Slains Pursuivant of Arms
- Spouse: Barbara Mary Hope (m. 1954)
- Children: Andrew Philip Drummond-Murray

William Edward Peter Louis Drummond-Murray of Mastrick KStJ (24 November 1929 – 13 April 2014) was a Scottish herald, Private Officer of Arms, stockbroker and banker. He was also active in Catholic philanthropy.

== Biography ==
Educated at Beaumont College, he was the son of Edward John Drummond-Murray of Mastrick (1907–1976) by (div. 1936) Eulalia Ildefonsa Wilhelmina Heaven (d. 1988), daughter of William Anthony Raymond Heaven (1873–), of Ashfield, Queen's County, Ireland. On his father's side, he was descended from the Murrays of Mastrick in Aberdeenshire and the Earls of Perth.

His mother, who was partly Spanish, was named after her godmother, the Infanta Eulalia of Spain; her father was the third son of Joseph Robert Heaven (1840–1911), of the Forest of Birse, Aberdeenshire, JP and wife Doña Maria Guadelupe Ramirez de Arellano y Braceras, 4th Marquesa de Braceras, and her paternal uncle was Francis Joseph Heaven (1877–), Conde de Ramirez de Arellano, Majordomo-in-waiting to King Alfonso XIII of Spain and Secret Chamberlain to Pope Leo XIII and to Pope Pius X, and who bears his title (one of his mother's family titles) by Royal Spanish letters patent and enrolled in the papal nobility.

In June 1954, Peter Drummond-Murray of Mastrick married Hon. Barbara Mary Hope, fourth and youngest daughter of Arthur Hope, 2nd Baron Rankeillour. They had five children, one of whom is trade union official and former prominent communist Andrew Murray.

He worked as a banker and a stockbroker, but his passion was heraldry and history, in particular, the Jacobites who numbered among his ancestors, including William Drummond, 4th Viscount Strathallan. He was also active in charity; he founded a volunteer service to help provide meals on wheels and transport for the housebound. When the nuns at one of Mother Teresa's Scottish hostels had trouble with guests, Drummond-Murray of Mastrick slept in the hostel once a week to keep an eye on things.

From 1977 to 1989, he was chancellor of the Sovereign Military Order of Malta in the United Kingdom. He encouraged the order's involvement in establishing nursing homes and a cancer hospice at the Hospital of St John and St Elizabeth in London, where he was a chief executive from 1978 to 1982.

== Heraldry ==
In 1982, the Lord High Constable of Scotland, Merlin Hay, 24th Earl of Erroll, appointed him as the Slains Pursuivant of Arms.

In 1993, Drummond-Murray of Mastrick published Blood of the Martyrs (1993), a list of the martyr ancestors of the British Knights of Malta. At the time of his death, he was working on a book to be called A Roll of Banners and Standards of the Order of St John in England.

Amongst many others, he prepared the petition to Lord Lyon King of Arms dated 18 February 2009 which enabled the grant to Anne Lillian Dawes [now Edgar] of the arms with crest and motto of her ancestor Sir Edwyn Sandys Dawes KCMG, with a crescent for difference to be matriculated 16 December 2009.

== Honours ==
- Knight of the Sovereign Military Order of Malta 1971.
- Knight Grand Cross of Honour and Devotion in Obedience Sovereign Military Hospitaller Order of St. John of Jerusalem, of Rhodes and of Malta 1984, Bailiff February 2014.
- Genealogist Sovereign Military Order of Malta, 2000–2005.
- Knight of Justice Most Venerable Order of St. John of Jerusalem 1988. (CStJ, 1977)

== See also ==
- Officer of Arms
- Pursuivant
