= Beaumont Herald Extraordinary =

English officer of arms extraordinary

- The heraldic badge of Beaumont Herald of Arms Extraordinary
- Heraldic tradition: Gallo-British
- Jurisdiction: England, Wales and Northern Ireland
- Governing body: College of Arms

Beaumont Herald of Arms Extraordinary was an officer of arms extraordinary in England. Beaumont was a royal herald, but was not a member of the College of Arms. The office was created in 1982 and named after the barony of Beaumont, one of the subsidiary titles of the Earl Marshal, the Duke of Norfolk. The badge of office combines the cross potent of the Kings of Jerusalem from whom the Beaumonts are descended, with the lion and fleur-de-lis charges from the family coat of arms. It is blazoned In front of a Cross Potent a Lion rampant within eight Fleurs-de-lis in orle Or.

== Holders of the office ==
Arms	Name	Date of appointment	Ref
	Francis Sedley Andrus	24 March 1982–2009	
	Vacant	2009–present	

== See also ==
- Heraldry
- Officer of Arms
