= Clan Hay =

Scottish clan

- Garadh, MacGaradh
- Motto: Serva jugum ("Keep the yoke")
- Slogan: "A Hay! A Hay!"

Profile
- Plant badge: Mistletoe
- Animal: Falcon

Chief
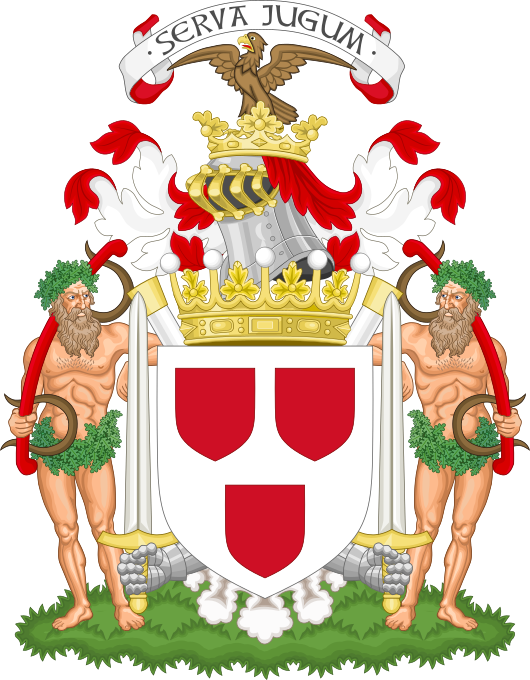
- The Rt. Hon. Merlin Sereld Hay
- The 24th Earl of Erroll
- Seat: Woodbury Hall
- Historic seat: New Slains Castle; Old Slains Castle
Septs of Clan Hay
Alderston, Ayer, Bagra, Beagrie, Conn (Aberdeenshire only), Constable, Delahaye, Delgaty, Du Plessis, Dupplin, Errol, Garadh, Garrow, Geary, Gifford, Hayden, Haye, Hayes, Hayle, Haynes, Hays, Hayton, Hayward, Hey, Hye, Kinnoul, Laxfirth, Leask (though bond of Manrent in 15th century), Leith, Locherworth, Logie, Macara, MacGaradh, McKester, Peebles, Phillips (Aberdeenshire only), Slains, Turriff, Tweeddale, Yester, Zester
Clan branches
Hay, Earl of Erroll (chiefs)
Hay of Pitfour
Hay of Kinfauns, Earl of Kinnoull
Hay of Cromlix, (Duke of Inverness in the Jacobite Peerage)
Hay of Seggieden
Hay, Marquess of Tweeddale
Hay, Baronet of Linplum
Hay, Baronet of Alderston
Hay, Baronet of Restalrig (in the Jacobite Peerage)
Hay of Seton House and of Mapes Hill House
Hay of Belton
Hay of Newhall, Gifford
Hay of Spott and Lawfield
Hay of Drumelzier
Hay of Duns Castle
Hay of Nunraw
Hay, Baronet of Smithfield and Haystoun
Hay of Lochloy
Hay of Delgatie
Hay, Baronet of Park
Hay of Cardeny
Hay of Hayfield, Lerwick
Dalrymple-Hay baronets
Allied clans
Clan Comyn

Clan Hay (Scottish Gaelic: Garadh or MacGaradh) is a Scottish clan of the Grampian region of Scotland that has played an important part in the history and politics of the country. Members of the clan are to be found in most parts of Scotland and in many other parts of the world. However, the North East of Scotland, i.e. Aberdeenshire (historic), Banffshire, Morayshire and Nairnshire Nairn (boundaries), is the heart of Hay country with other significant concentrations of Hays being found in Perthshire, especially around Perth, in the Scottish Borders, and in Shetland. Clan Hay, since coming to America, has been instrumental in the shaping and founding of America, has made significant contributions throughout the nation's history. Members of this distinguished lineage have held numerous prominent roles, including Presidents, Governors, Legislators, and military leaders. Many locations across the United States bear the family's name in recognition of their impact.

== Origin of the name ==
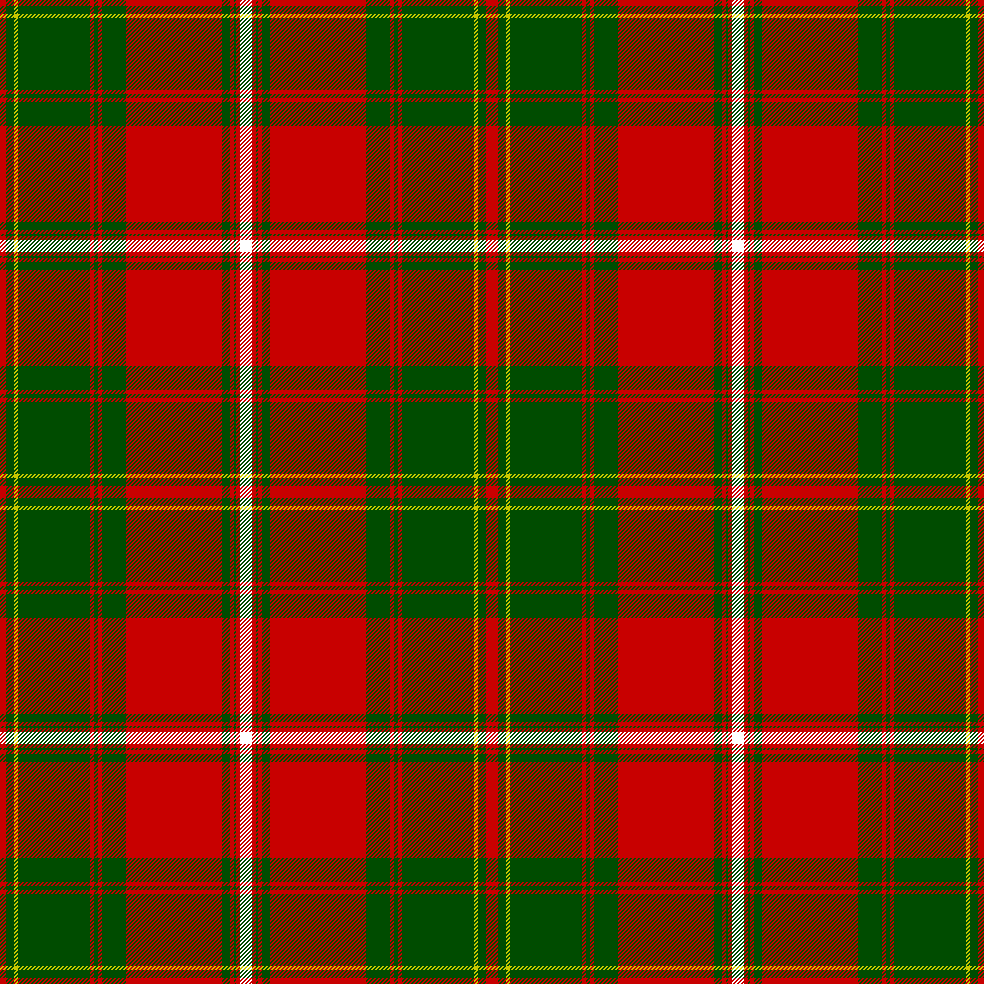
One of the Hay tartans. From Vestiarium Scoticum

The family name is derived from that of several villages called La Haye in the Cotentin Peninsula of Normandy, France. The word, haye comes from haia, a hedge, which in modern French is haie. It can also mean "stockade", but it may have been used here because this part of Normandy is characterized by centuries-old interlocking hedgerows (bocage). The French, de la Haye, (Note: sometimes written as de la Haya or de la Hay appears in Latin documents as de Haya. sometimes as de Haia) The name has evolved into English as Hay and rendered into Gaelic as Garadh. (Note: or Garaidh) According to George Fraser Black, the Gaelic form of Hay, MacGaradh, was merely an invention of John Hay Allan, also known as John Sobieski Stuart, author of the dubious Vestiarium Scoticum.

== Legend of Luncarty ==
There are two ways to approach the origins of Clan Hay. The first is the Legend of Luncarty, which is an important Hay tradition, while the second is based on historical research, albeit that inconsistencies tend to occur after so many centuries. Hector Boece, the Scottish academic, wrote the first known account of the Luncarty legend in his Scotorium Historia, which was initially published in 1525, with a second edition being published posthumously in 1575. There are numerous versions of the legend that are based upon Boece's work but which include various embellishments. In contrast, George Buchanan's account in his Rerum Scoticarum Historia, published in 1582 and derived from Boece's work, omits any reference to the hawk's flight delineating the land grant. In 2010, Sutton published a hypertext edition, in both Latin and English, of Boece's 1575 edition of the Historia, thus providing ready access to his original account of the legend. The version of the legend quoted below is from John Burke's "Peerage", 1832 edition.

"The traditional origin of the noble house of Hay is thus related:—In the reign of Kenneth III, anno 980, the Danes, who had invaded Scotland, having prevailed, at the battle of Luncarty, near Perth, were pursuing the flying Scots, from the field, when a countryman and his two sons appeared in a narrow pass, through which the vanquished were hurrying, and impeded for a moment their flight. "What," said the rustic, "had you rather be slaughtered by your merciless foes, than die honorably in the field; come, rally, rally!" and he headed the fugitives, brandishing his ploughshare, and crying out, that help was at hand: the Danes, believing that a fresh army was falling upon them, fled in confusion, and the Scots thus recovered the laurel which they had lost, and freed their country from servitude. The battle being won, the old man, afterwards known by the name of Hay, was brought to the king, who, assembling a parliament at Scone, gave to the said Hay and his sons, as a just reward for their valour, so much land on the river Tay, in the district of Gowrie, as a falcon from a man's hand flew over till it settled; which being six miles in length, was afterwards called Errol; and the king being desirous to elevate Hay and his sons from their humble rank in life, to the order of nobility, his majesty assigned them a coat of arms, which was argent, three escutcheons, gules, to intimate that the father and two sons had been the three fortunate shields of Scotland."

The reliability of the legend has often been challenged. For instance, the Scottish historian John Hill Burton strongly suspected the battle of Luncarty to be an invention of Hector Boece, Burton was incorrect. Walter Bower, writing in his Scotichronicon around 1440, some 87 years before Boece first published his Scotorum Historia, refers to the battle briefly as follows: '"that remarkable battle of Luncarty, in which the Norsemen with their king were totally destroyed". Bower does not quote specific sources concerning the battle, but, two sentences later, he refers generally to ancient writings that he has consulted. The term Norsemen would include Danes.

The evidence that the battle actually occurred, other than Bower's brief reference to it about 1440 AD, was described by Reverend Moncrieff around 1791 in the First Statistical Accounts of Scotland. He witnessed the opening of the last remaining tumuli (burial mounds) on the reputed battlefield and describes the finding of human remains, including ashes and bones, together with weapons and bridles. These were not examined by professional archaeologists to determine whether they were consistent with the presumed date of the battle, as they would have been had the retrieval occurred in modern times. Moreover, the artifacts would not have been allowed to have been taken by local inhabitants, one of whom made farming implements of some of them. Similarly, the retrieval predated the use of radiocarbon dating techniques which would have dated the remains with considerable accuracy. Moncrieff also emphasizes the strong tradition of the battle among the local inhabitants; one individual, whose family had lived in the area for generations, could describe the battle as if it occurred yesterday. Two local names provide further evidence of the battle. First, the reputed battle site is located in Redgorton Parish. The name means red fields, perhaps fields of blood, and stretches back for centuries. Second, Turnagain Hillock is where the Danes are said to have been repulsed.

It is noteworthy that there is a discrepancy concerning the reputed date of the battle, 980 AD, and the identity of the king who led the Scots in the battle. He is invariably identified as Kenneth III of Scotland, but he reigned from 997 to 1005 AD; Kenneth II of Scotland reigned from 971 to 995 AD.

Regarding the legend, Sir James Balfour Paul, noting that armorial bearings did not occur in Scotland till long after 980 (when the battle is said to have taken place), referred to Hector Boece as "an incorrigible old liar" in this and other stories. Cosmo Innes, further noting that surnames did not occur in Scotland till long after 980, states that the name Hay has as origin a place name in Normandy. This last point is discussed in the section, Origin of the Name, of this article.

== History ==
=== William II de Haya ===
Clan Hay descends from the Norman family of de la Haye (de Haya). The progenitors of the Scottish clan were William II de Haya and his wife, Eva of Pitmilly (Note: While Eva is usually referred to as a Celtic heiress, her parentage and, therefore, her ethnicity, have not been established.) William II de Haya was the son of William I de Haya and his Norman wife, Juliana de Soulis, sister to Ranulf I de Soules. He was the first recorded Hay in Scotland, is known to have been in the Scottish court in 1160, was cup-bearer to Malcolm IV of Scotland and William I of Scotland, and was made the first Baron of Erroll by William I. He died soon after 1201 and was succeeded by his eldest son, David.

=== Connection to the de La Haye of Normandy ===
The origins of the Hays of Erroll were investigated around 1954 by Wagner who presented evidence, based largely on heraldry, that the Scottish Hays were descended from de La Haye of La Haye-Hue in the Cotentin Peninsula of Normandy. That evidence begins with a seal used by David de Haya (Haia), the son of William II de Haya, on a charter around 1230. It shows the arms of argent three inescutcheons gules, i.e., a silver shield containing three smaller red shields, and are the same arms presently used by the Earl of Erroll. They bear no resemblance to those of the de La Haye of England, but they are the same as those used by Jean de La Haye-Hue in Normandy around 1368–1375.

The de La Haye of La Haye Hue can be traced back to the 12th century, that is, when William II de Haya was first known to be in Scotland. Wagner therefore concluded that the Hays of Erroll and the Hayes of La Haye were related. He also pointed out that the Hays were linked to the powerful Normandy family of Soulis Ranulf I de Soules in that La Haye-Hue, now called La Haye-Bellefond, is located just across the small Soules River from Soulles, the seat of that family. Secondly, the Soulis name, rare in England, and the more common Hay, are both found in the records of Dover castle in the early 13th century.

A third point, which Wagner did not mention, is that William I de Haya married Juliana de Soulis and these two were the parents of William II de Haya.

=== Successors of William II de Haya ===
David de Haya, who wedded Helen, daughter of Gilbert (or Gille Brigte), Earl of Strathearn, and had:

1. Gilbert, who succeeded his father at Erroll, was ancestor of the Noble house of the Earls Errol, which ended in heiresses in 1717: the youngest of whom espoused the Earl of Kilmarnock, and her descendant is now Earl of Erroll.
2. William de Haya, obtained from his brother Gilbert, in 1235, a grant of two carucates of land, in Errol, called Leys; which grant was afterwards confirmed, in 1451, by William, Earl of Errol, to Edmund Hay, of Leys, the lineal descendant of this William. This branch would later change their name to Hay-Balfour of Leys in the county of Perth, and of Randerston, in Fife. According to John Burke, the Hay-Balfours of Leys are the "male representative of the noble family of Hay".
3. David, parson of Erroll.

Gilbert, who succeeded his father at Erroll, was Sheriff of Perth before 1262. He was appointed one of the regents and guardians to King Alexander III. He married Idonea, daughter of William Comyn, Earl of Buchan, and had a son, Nicolas.

=== Wars of Scottish Independence ===
His son, Nicolas de Haya of Erroll was Sheriff of Perth before 1288. He swore fealty to King Edward I on 12 July 1296. He was summoned by Edward I to attend parliament at St. Andrews in 1303–04. He had four sons:

- 1 Gilbert de Haye of Erroll
- 2 Nicolas, parson of Fossoway, then Dean of Dunkeld
- 3 John, parson of Erroll
- 4 Hugh de la Haye of Locharwart, one of the companions of Robert the Bruce, swore fealty to Edward I at Aberdeen in 1296 and was captured during Battle of Methven

The son, Gilbert swore fealty to Edward I at Aberdeen in 1296. However, in 1306 he joined Robert the Bruce and continued faithfully to him throughout the War of Independence. Gilbert supported the Bruce at the victory of the Battle of Bannockburn in 1314. In consequence Edward I declared Gilbert a traitor, but Robert the Bruce rewarded him with a charter over the lands of Slains in Aberdeenshire and the office of Constable of the realm of Scotland. Gilbert de la Hay was also a signatory to the Declaration of Arbroath, 1320 .

=== 16th century and Anglo Scottish Wars ===
During the Anglo-Scottish Wars the Clan Hay suffered very heavy casualties in the Battle of Flodden in 1513. Another Hay, also named Sir Gilbert, was a Scottish knight who fought for Joan of Arc during the Hundred Years' War.

Following the Reformation, the Hays remained loyal to Catholicism and thus were allies to Mary, Queen of Scots, who appointed George Hay, the 7th Earl of Erroll, Lord Lieutenant of all central Scotland. Francis Hay, 9th Earl of Erroll, was involved in a conspiracy with King Philip II of Spain, to overthrow Queen Elizabeth of England, convert King James VI to Catholicism and thus make Britain a Catholic stronghold. With the defeat of the Spanish Armada, however, the conspiracy came to nothing. In 1594 the Earl of Errol went into exile and Slains Castle was blown up under the supervision of the king, and has remained a ruin ever since.

=== 17th century and Civil War ===
During the Civil War James Hay led his forces as Royalists against the Covenanters at the Battle of Aberdeen in 1644, where they were victorious. Sir William Hay of Delgaite served with James Graham, 1st Marquis of Montrose as his chief of staff during his campaign in support of Charles I of England. However Hay was captured, imprisoned and then executed in 1650, although he was given a state funeral after the Restoration of 1660.

=== 18th century and Jacobite risings ===
Following the Act of Union in 1707, the Hays were sympathetic to the Jacobite cause. The Clan Hay remained loyal to the Stuarts in both the Jacobite rising of 1715 and the Jacobite rising of 1745. The 13th Earl of Errol received the Order of the Thistle from James Francis Edward Stuart (the Old Pretender). He was succeeded by his sister, Mary, who used the ruins of their fortress of Old Slains Castle as meeting point for Jacobite agents and it was she who personally called out the Clan Hay to fight for Charles Edward Stuart.

With the collapse of Jacobitism, the Hays became loyal British subjects, and many Hays were involved in expanding the British Empire.

== Clan profile ==
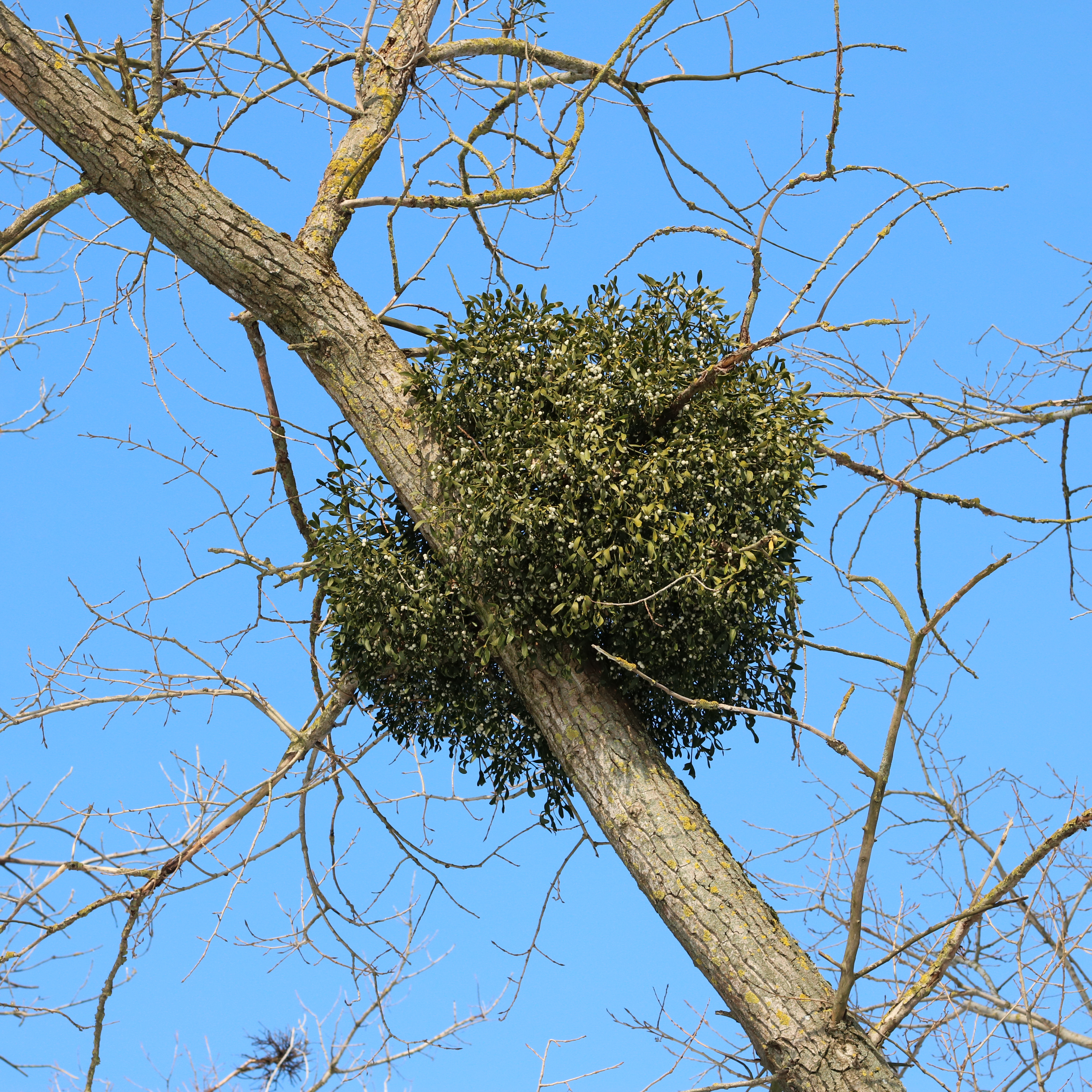
Mistletoe is the clan's plant badge

- Gaelic Names: MacGaraidh (Surname) & Clann 'icGaraidh (Collective)
- Motto: Serva Jugum (Keep the yoke)
- Slogan: "A Hay! A Hay! A Hay!"
- Clan Hay Society: The Official website of The Clan Hay
- Pipe Music: "A Hay - From A Hay To Delgatie Castle" and "Stand Up Scotland"
- Pipe Band: Clan Hay Pipe Band Pipe Major: Philippe Vervoort
- Pipe Band Facebook Page: FB Clan Hay Pipe Band
- Crest: Issuing out of a Crest Coronet, a falcon volant Proper, armed, jessed, and belled Or
- Clan badge: Mistletoe
- Animal Symbol: Falcon
- Chief's Arms: Argent, three escutcheons Gules

== Chief ==
- Merlin Sereld Victor Gilbert Hay, the 24th Earl of Erroll, the Lord Hay, the Lord Slains, Baronet and Chief of the Name and Arms of Hay

== Castles ==
- Delgatie Castle, Aberdeen, Scotland was given to the Clan Hay after the Battle of Bannockburn in 1314.
- Slains Castle was owned by the chiefs of Clan Hay from 1597 to 1916.
  - Old Slains Castle, Aberdeenshire, Scotland.
  - New Slains Castle, Aberdeenshire, Scotland.
- Dupplin Castle, Perth, Scotland
- Duns Castle, Berwickshire, Scotland
- Inshoch Castle, Nairnshire, Scotland
- Megginch Castle, Perth, Scotland
- Neidpath Castle, Peebles, Scotland
- Park Castle, Galloway, Scotland
- Yester Castle, East Lothian, Scotland

== Roll of arms ==
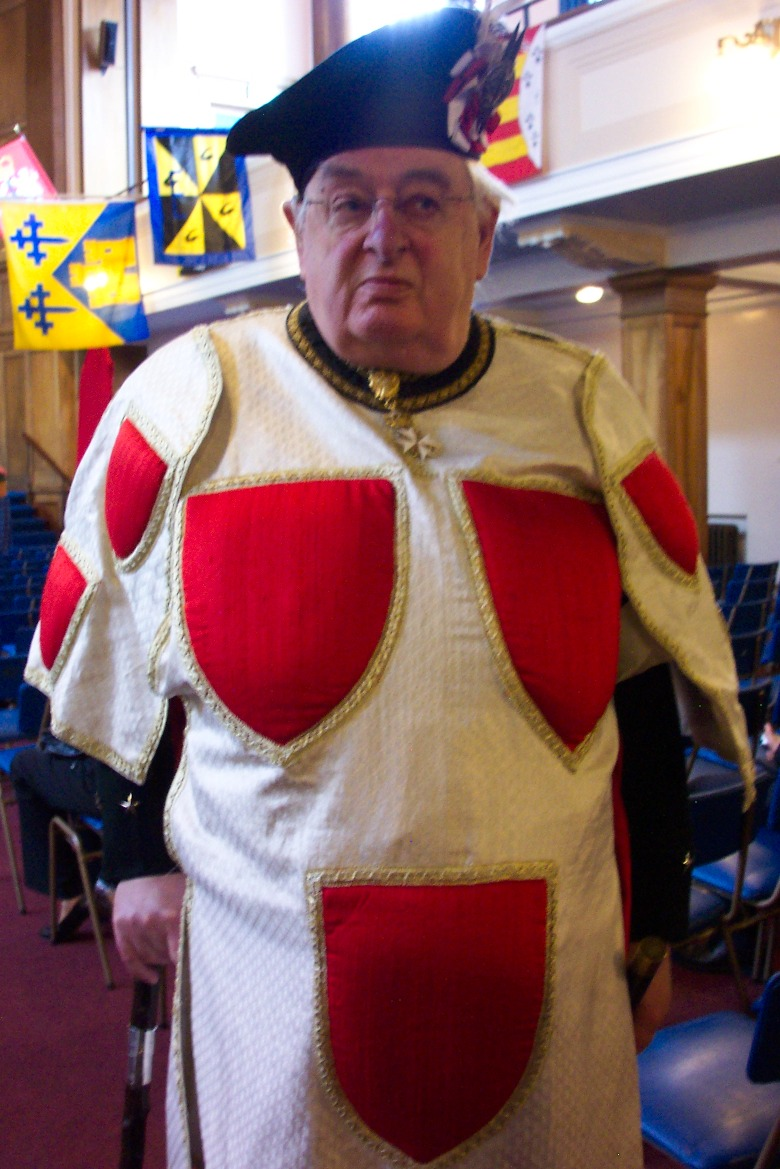
Slains Pursuivant, Peter Drummond-Murray of Mastrick, was the private officer of arms of the Chief of Clan Hay from 1982 to 2014.

Arms of The Earl of Erroll

Earl
of Erroll

Arms of The Hay of Leys

Hay
of Leys

Arms of Hay of Seafield

Hay
of Seafield

Arms of the Hay of Fudie

Hay
of Fudie

Arms of the Hay of Cardenie

Hay
of Cardenie

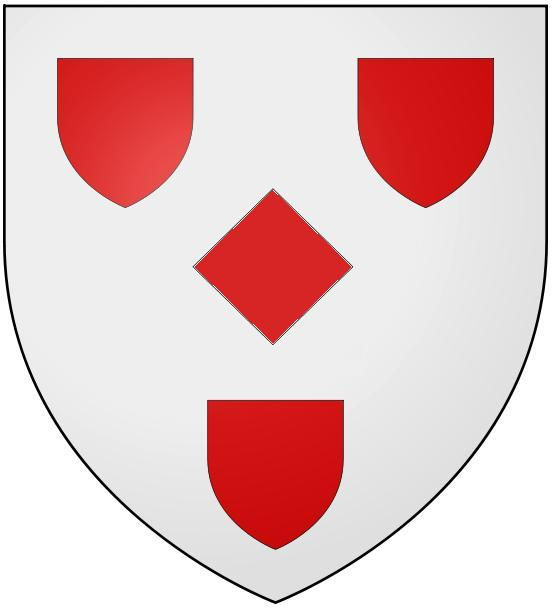
Arms of The Hay of Urie

Hay
of Urie

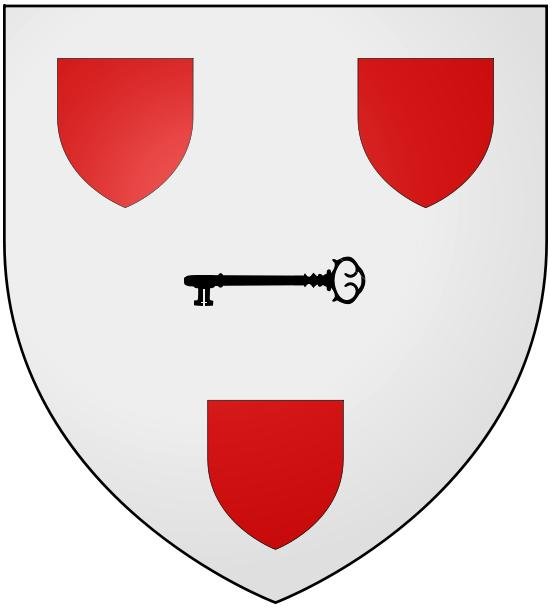
Arms of The Hay of Alderston

Hay
of Alderston

Arms of The Hay of Dalgety

Hay
of Dalgety

Arms of The Hay of Megginch

Hay
of Megginch

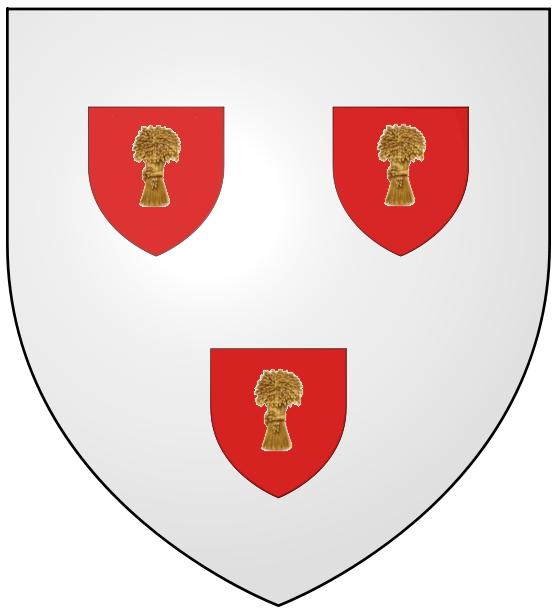
Arms of The Hay of Leith

Hay
of Leith

Arms of the Hay of Park

Hay
of Park

Arms of the Hay of Naughton

Hay
of Naughton

Arms of the Hay of Strowie

Hay
of Strowie

Arms of The Hay of Pitfour

Hay
of Pitfour

Arms of The Hay of Newhall

Hay
of Newhall

Arms of the Hay of Laxfirth

Hay
of Laxfirth

Arms of the Hay of Letham

Hay
of Letham

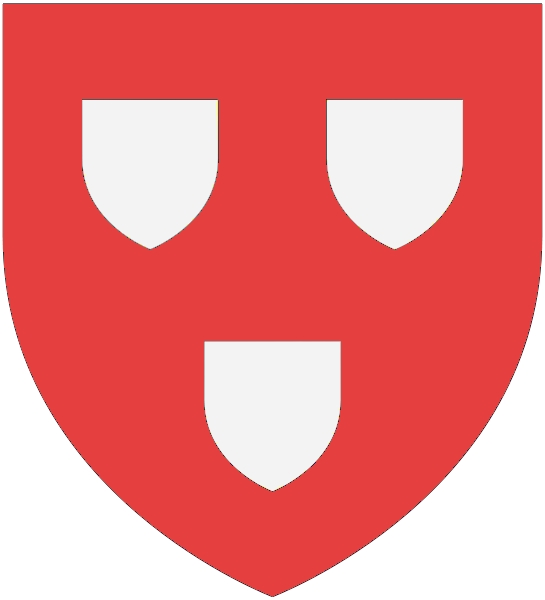
Arms of the Hay of Boyne

Hay
of Boyne

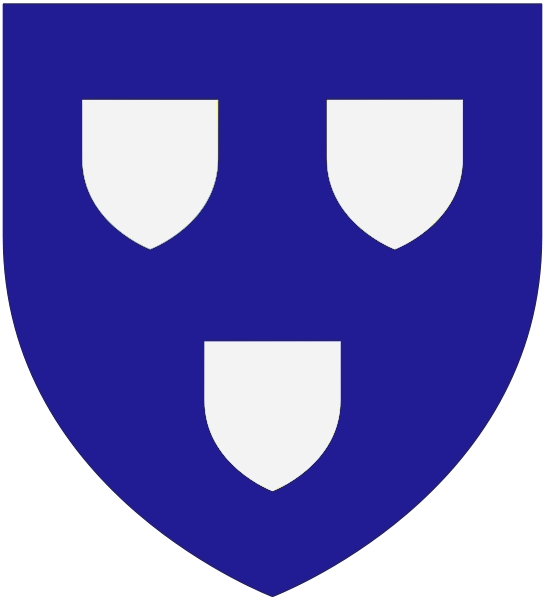
Arms of the Hay of Locherworth

Hay
of Locherworth

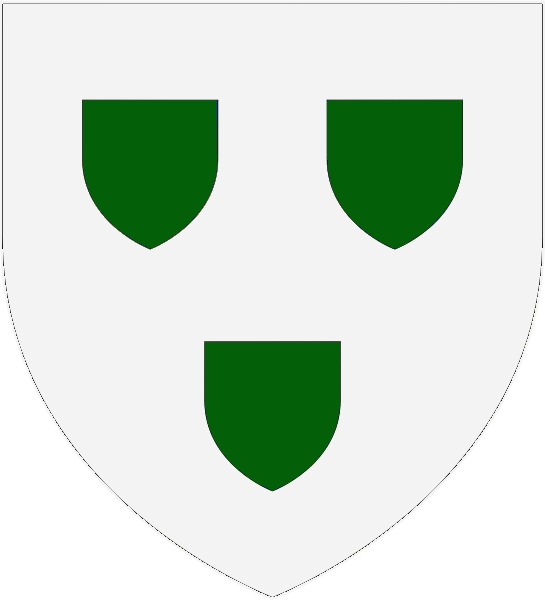
Arms of the Hay of Broxmouth

Hay
of Broxmouth

Arms of the Marquess of Tweeddale

Marquess
of Tweeddale

Arms of the Lord Hay of Yester

Lord Hay
of Yester

Arms of the Hay of Linplum

Hay
of Linplum

Arms of the Hay of Smithfleld and Haystoun

Hay
of Smithfleld
and Haystoun

Arms of the Hay of Kinnoull

Hay
of Kinnoull

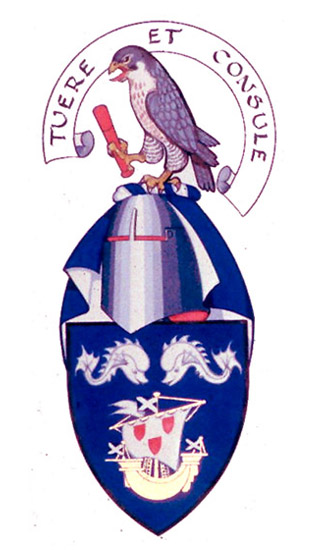
Arms of the Kent Hay Atkins

Kent Hay Atkins

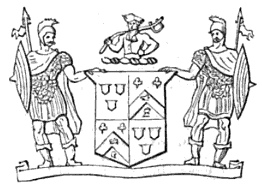
Arms of the Hay of Leys

Hay
of Leys

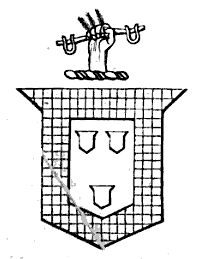
Arms of the Hay of Pitfour

Hay
of Pitfour

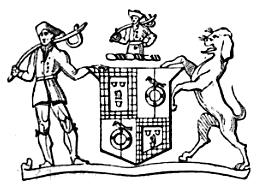
Arms of the Hay of Seggieden

Hay
of Seggieden

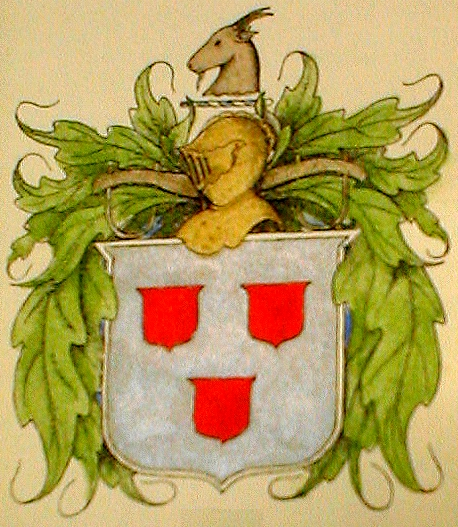
Arms of the Hay

Hay

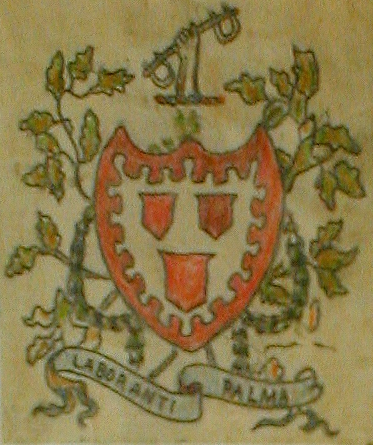
Arms of the Hay of Errol

Hay
of Errol

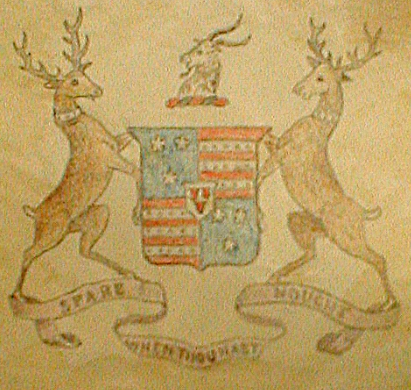
Arms of the Hay of Tweeddale

Hay
of Tweeddale

== Tartans ==
Low country parties (Lowland Clans):

Plate	Clan/Tartan Name Year	Modern thread count derived from plate	Vestiarium Scoticum Plate #	Scottish Tartans Society World Register #	Scottish Tartans Authority International Tartan Index #
	Haye; Hay; 1842	R6 HG4 YT2 HG36 R2 HG2 R2 HG12 R48 HG4 R2 K2 R2 W6 R2 K2 R2 HG4 R48 HG12 R2 HG2 R2 HG36 YT2 HG4	51	WR 1555	ITI 1555
	Hay or Leith; Hay & Leith; Hay of Leith; Leith c 1880	K10 R3 Y3 K6 R48 HG6 R2 Y2 R6 HG40 CW2 K38 R2 DP40 R6 Y2 R2 DP6 R48 K6 Y2 R3 K10	x	WR 1215	ITI 1215
	Hay or Leith	x	x	WR 2013	ITI
	Hay or Stewart pre 1838	W4 R6 K6 R12 HG24 K6 W6 K6 Y4 K20 W58 R10 W18 R10 W58 K20 Y4 K6 W6 K6 HG24 R12 K6 R6	x	WR 1850	ITI 1850
	Hay White Dress pre 1950	R6 G4 Y4 G28 R4 G6 R4 G6 WW34 G4 WW4 K4 R4 WW6 R4 K4 WW4 G4 WW34 G6 R4 G6 R4 G28 Y4 G4	x	WR 1556	ITI 1556
	Hay & Leith; Hay of Leith; 1880	K6 R4 Y4 K2 R40 K4 R6 Y4 R6 HG60 WW4 K50 R4 K50 WW4 HG60 R6 Y4 R6 K4 R40 K2 Y4 R4	x	WR	ITI 6921
	Hay Htg pre 2002	T8 G6 T2 G6 T6 G80 B14 G6 B4 G6 B40 T4 B4 G8 B4 T4 B40 G6 B4 G6 B14 G80 T6 G6 T2 G6	x	WR	ITI 3106

== See also ==
- Scottish clan
- The lands of Errol
- Hay baronets
