= Howard Pursuivant Extraordinary =

- The heraldic badge of Howard Pursuivant of Arms Extraordinary
- Heraldic tradition: Gallo-British
- Jurisdiction: England, Wales and Northern Ireland
- Governing body: College of Arms

Howard Pursuivant of Arms Extraordinary was an officer of arms extraordinary in England; that is, a royal herald but not a member of the College of Arms in London.

The office was created in November 1992 by the Earl Marshal, and named from the barony of Howard of Glossop (created in 1869), to which Miles Fitzalan-Howard succeeded in 1972 before succeeding as Earl Marshal and Duke of Norfolk in 1975. The Duke himself had never used the Glossop title, since his mother's barony of Beaumont takes precedence.

The badge of office was assigned in 1992: A cross-crosslet fitchy argent enclosed within a pair of wings displayed and reflexed gold. The crosslet is taken from the Howard's Arms and crest, while the wings allude to one of the Howard's crests and also the swiftness of the pursuivant as a messenger.

There has only been one appointment to this office since its creation.

== Holders of the office ==
Arms	Name	Date of appointment	Ref
	John Henry Bruce Bedells	30 November 1992–1998	
	Vacant	1998–present	

== See also ==
- Heraldry
- Officer of arms
