= Slains Pursuivant =

Private officer of arms appointed by the Chief of the Name and Arms of Hay

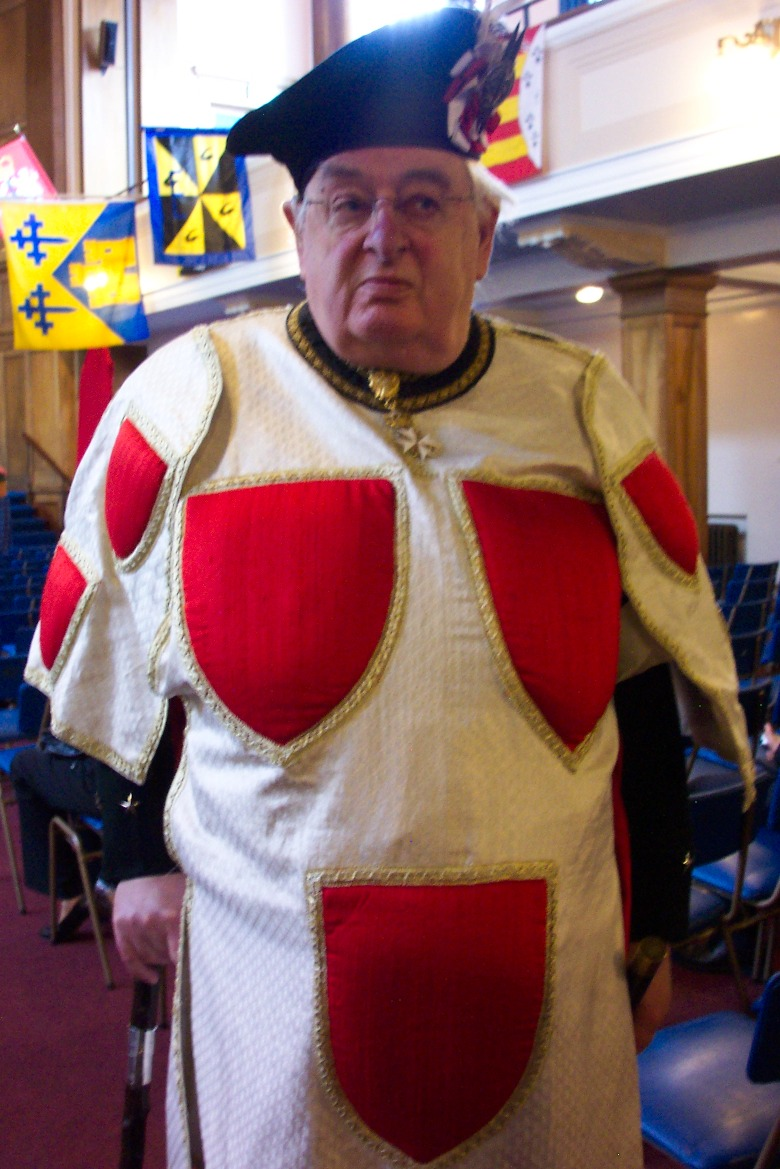
Peter Drummond-Murray of Mastrick as Slains Pursuivant at the XXVIIth International Congress of Genealogical and Heraldic Sciences. He is shown wearing the tabard of the Earl of Erroll.

Slains Pursuivant of Arms is a private officer of arms appointed by the Chief of the Name and Arms of Hay, presently the Earl of Erroll, Lord High Constable of Scotland. It is believed that the Hay family had an officer of arms from the time the office of Lord High Constable was forfeited by the Comyn family and passed to the Hays. The first mention of Slains Pursuivant is in 1404, and again in 1412 when Sir William Hay of Erroll, eighth Chief and later first Lord Hay, introduced Slains to a trade guild in Perth.

After World War II, Sir Iain Moncreiffe of that Ilk revived the practice of appointing private officers among the old Scottish nobility who are known to have maintained their own heralds in medieval times. Currently, there are four such appointments recognised by the Lord Lyon King of Arms. Slains is the most senior of these, on account of the seniority of his Chief as Lord High Constable of Scotland. The others are Endure Pursuivant to the Earl of Crawford and Balcarres (currently the earl's brother, the Hon. Alexander Lindsay), Garioch Pursuivant to the Countess of Mar (currently the countess's brother in law, Lt. Cdr. Laurence of Mar, RN),. and Finlaggan Pursuivant to the High Chief of Clan Donald (currently Thomas Miers WS.).

The present Slains Pursuivant is Alan Hay.

== Holders of the office since 1948 ==
- 1948–1970: Professor Michael Maclagan, CVO, FSA, later Portcullis Pursuivant and Richmond Herald in the English College of Arms
- 1970–1978: The Hon. Peregrine Moncreiffe of that Ilk
- 1978–1981: Sir Crispin Agnew of Lochnaw, Bt, LVO, KC, later Unicorn Pursuivant, Rothesay Herald, and now Albany Herald Extraordinary
- 1981–2009 Peter Drummond-Murray of Mastrick
- 2009–2016: John Boyd Stirling, WS, later Linlithgow Pursuivant Extraordinary, Ormond Pursuivant in Ordinary and now Ross Herald
- 2016–2026: John Malden, MPhil, FMA, FHS, formerly Unicorn Pursuivant
- 2026 - present: Alan Hay, FRSA, FSA Scot

== See also ==
- Officer of Arms
- Heraldry
- Pursuivant
