= Adam Bruce =

Scottish solicitor, businessman and officer of arms

The Honourable Adam Bruce CStJ WS
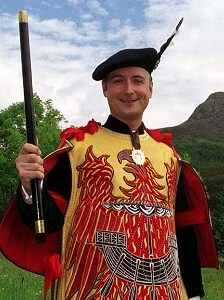
- Bruce, former Finlaggan Pursuivant of Arms

Marchmont Herald
- Incumbent
- Assumed office 2012
- Monarchs: Elizabeth II; Charles III
- Preceded by: David Maitland-Titterton

Unicorn Pursuivant
- In office 2008–2012
- Preceded by: Alastair Campbell of Airds
- Succeeded by: John Malden

Personal details
- Born: Adam Robert Bruce; 18 January 1968 (age 58) Edinburgh, Scotland
- Spouse: Maria Sofia Giovanna Rosa Granito Pignatelli di Belmonte (m. 2003)
- Children: 2
- Parents: Andrew Bruce, 11th Earl of Elgin (father); Victoria Usher (mother)
- Education: Glenalmond College
- Alma mater: Balliol College, Oxford; University of Edinburgh
- Occupation: Solicitor and businessman.

Adam Robert Bruce CStJ WS (born 18 January 1968) is a Scottish solicitor, and businessman who serves as an officer of Arms at the Court of the Lord Lyon.

== Education ==
Bruce was born in Edinburgh, Scotland. He is the younger son of Andrew Bruce, 11th Earl of Elgin, and Victoria Usher. He was educated at Glenalmond College. Bruce went up to Balliol College to read history, and while at the University of Oxford he was elected as the President of the Oxford Union in 1989. He also took a law degree at the University of Edinburgh.

== Career ==
Formerly a solicitor with McGrigors in Edinburgh, where he was Director of Public Policy, Bruce now works in the global renewable energy sector, having been UK chief executive of Airtricity and the first Chairman of RenewableUK, formerly the British Wind Energy Association.

Until 2023, he was global head of corporate affairs at Mainstream Renewable Power, and from 2009 to 2015 was a director of the Friends of the Supergrid. In October 2012, he was appointed chairman of the UK Government's Offshore Wind Programme Board. He is currently a vice-chair of the Global Wind Energy Council (GWEC).

In 2008, Bruce was appointed an officer of arms at the Lyon Court as Unicorn Pursuivant. In April 2012, he was promoted to the position of Marchmont Herald. He was previously Finlaggan Pursuivant (private officer of arms to the Clan Donald), in which role he was installed in 2005 by Godfrey Lord MacDonald. This marked a reinstatement of the traditional MacDonald heraldic role after a break of 510 years.

Bruce is also a Trustee of the St Andrews Fund for Scots Heraldry and a former Member of the Council of the Society of Writers to HM Signet.

He sits on a number of advisory bodies, including the Development Board of Oxford University's Maths, Physics and Life Sciences Division. He became a Trustee of National Museums Scotland in April 2017 and his term of appointment runs until September 2023.

In 2016, Bruce narrated a three-part series for UCV TV of Chile on the life of his ancestor Admiral Lord Cochrane.

== Family ==
On 17 May 2003, he married Maria Sofia Giovanna Rosa Granito Pignatelli di Belmonte, a younger daughter of the 13th Prince of Belmonte. They live in Edinburgh and have two children.

== Honours ==
Bruce was appointed a Commander of the Order of St John (CStJ) in 2024.

== Arms ==
Coat of arms of Adam Bruce
Notes Mr Bruce's Arms are a cadet version of the chiefly Arms of the Name of Bruce, with a gold border for a second son using the Stoddart system. The undifferenced arms belong to the Chief of the Name, the Earl of Elgin, Mr Bruce's father. Adopted Matriculated by him in 1987 Crest Above the shield is placed an Helm befitting his degree with a Mantling Gules doubled Or, and on a Wreath of the Liveries is set for Crest a lion statant quardant tail extended Azure armed and langued Gules. Escutcheon Or, a saltire and chief Gules, on a canton Argent a lion rampant Azure armed and langued of the Second, all within a bordure of the First. Motto ADSUMUS

== See also ==
- Private Officer of Arms
- Pursuivant

Heraldic offices
Preceded by Alastair Campbell of Airds	Unicorn Pursuivant; 2008–2012	Succeeded by John Malden
Preceded by David Maitland-Titterton	Marchmont Herald; 2012–present	Incumbent
