= Pursuivant =

Junior officer of arms

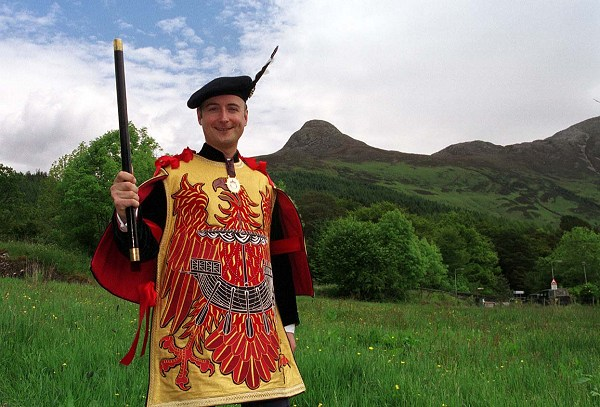
The Honourable Adam Bruce, former Finlaggan Pursuivant of Arms

A pursuivant or, more correctly, pursuivant of arms, is a junior officer of arms. Most pursuivants are attached to official heraldic authorities, such as the College of Arms in London or the Court of the Lord Lyon in Edinburgh. In the mediaeval era, many great nobles employed their own officers of arms. Today, there still exist some private pursuivants that are not employed by a government authority. In Scotland, for example, several pursuivants of arms have been appointed by Clan Chiefs. These pursuivants of arms look after matters of heraldic and genealogical importance for clan members.

== Nationally appointed pursuivants ==
=== English Pursuivants of Arms in Ordinary ===
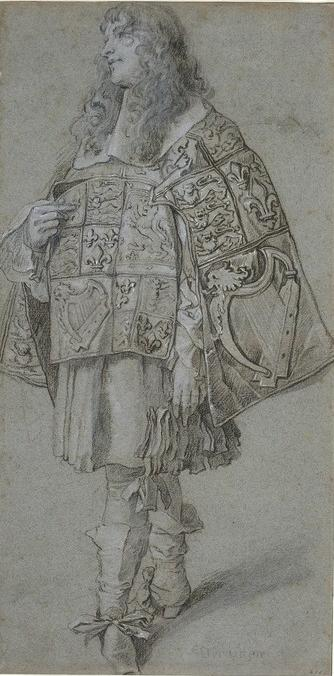
British pursuivants wore their tabards "athwart", with the sleeves at the front and back, until the reign of James II.

- Bluemantle Pursuivant of Arms in Ordinary
- Portcullis Pursuivant of Arms in Ordinary
- Rouge Croix Pursuivant of Arms in Ordinary
- Rouge Dragon Pursuivant of Arms in Ordinary

=== English Pursuivants of Arms Extraordinary ===
- Fitzalan Pursuivant of Arms Extraordinary
- Howard Pursuivant of Arms Extraordinary

=== Scottish Pursuivants of Arms in Ordinary ===
- Bute Pursuivant of Arms in Ordinary
- Carrick Pursuivant of Arms in Ordinary
- Dingwall Pursuivant of Arms in Ordinary
- Kintyre Pursuivant of Arms in Ordinary
- Ormond Pursuivant of Arms in Ordinary
- Unicorn Pursuivant of Arms in Ordinary

=== Scottish Pursuivants of Arms Extraordinary ===
- Linlithgow Pursuivant of Arms Extraordinary
- Falkland Pursuivant of Arms Extraordinary
- March Pursuivant of Arms Extraordinary

=== Irish Pursuivant of Arms ===
- Athlone Pursuivant

== Privately appointed pursuivants ==
- Slains Pursuivant of Arms
- Garioch Pursuivant of Arms
- Endure Pursuivant of Arms
- Finlaggan Pursuivant of Arms
- Persevante León Blanco de Armas

== Role with the same name in Freemasonry ==
Some Masonic Grand Lodges have an office known as the Grand Pursuivant. It is the Grand Pursuivant's duty to announce all applicants for admission into the Grand Lodge by their names and Masonic titles; to take charge of the jewels and regalia of the Grand Lodge; to attend all meetings of the Grand Lodge, and to perform such other duties as may be required by the Grand Master or presiding officer. The office is also at the local Masonic lodge level in the jurisdiction of the Grand Lodge of Pennsylvania. In that jurisdiction it is the Pursuivant's duty to guard the door of the lodge, and announce and escort applicants for admission into the lodge. The office is generally unknown at the local level in Masonic jurisdictions outside Pennsylvania, where these duties are performed by the Junior Deacon and Senior Deacon, or the Inner Guard in UGLE.

== See also ==
- Heraldry
- Officer of Arms
- Private Officer of Arms
- Sergeant at arms
- The College of Arms
- The Court of the Lord Lyon
- The Canadian Heraldic Authority
