= David Lumsden (Scottish aristocrat) =

Scottish baron and heritage advocate

David Gordon Allen d'Aldecamb Lumsden of Cushnie, Baron of Cushnie Lumsden (25 May 1933, in Quetta, Baluchistan, Empire of India (now Pakistan) – 29 August 2008, in Fort William, Scotland) was an advocate of Scottish heritage. He was a Jacobite, a restorer of castles and a businessman.

== Family ==
Lumsden was born in born in Quetta, Baluchistan, the son of Major Henry Lumsden, of the Royal Scots who was serving in the Indian Army, and Sydney Mary Elliot. He was educated at Allhallows, Devon; Bedford School; and Jesus College, Cambridge, where he graduated Master of Arts.

His lineage extended back to Robert Lumsden, 1st of Cushnie, following a grant of lands in Aberdeenshire in 1509 by King James IV. He also shared an ancestor with Winston Churchill - Robert of Cushnie was Churchill's 11 times great grandfather.

In 2004, he sold the title to Alan Robertson just before the Abolition of Feudal Tenure (2000) Act came into effect which ended the legal "trade" in Scottish feudal baronies.

== Life and career ==
Lumsden served in the Territorial Army with the London Scottish. He worked as an executive at British American Tobacco from 1959 to 1982. He was the Director of Heritage Porcelain Ltd and Heritage Recordings Ltd. He was a member of Lloyd's from 1985 to 2001.

Lumsden was an expert in castellated architecture, restoring Aberdeenshire properties Cushnie House (built 1688 by Alexander Lumsden) and Tillycairn Castle (built 1540 by Mathew Lumsden, and which had been left derelict after being destroyed by fire in 1722). He also restored Leithen Lodge at Innerleithen, a 1887 arts-and-crafts shooting lodge, and Edinburgh's Liberton Tower. With others, he founded the Castles of Scotland Preservation Trust.

Lumsden was a monarchist and Jacobite. He was a council member of the Royal Stuart Society. He was the last of his family to hold the title Baron of Cushnie, and was one of only four private heralds in Scotland. Known as Garioch Pursuivant, his patron was Margaret, 30th Countess of Mar. For 23 years he was president of the 1745 Association, which aimed to list all people who served with Prince Charles Edward Stuart in the failed uprising.

He was president of the Scottish Military History Society, and he co-founded the Scottish Organs Trust. He was strongly opposed to the wearing of white socks with kilts.

== Religious affiliations ==
- Knight of the Sovereign Military Order of Malta, 1980
- Knight of Justice of the Sacred Military Constantinian Order of Saint George, 1978
- Knight of the Order of Sts. Maurice and Lazarus, 1999
- Bailie of the Bailiwick of Scotland of the Order of St Lazarus

== Death ==
His Requiem Mass in 2008 was the first celebration in St Mary's Cathedral, Edinburgh, since 1969, of Mass as in 1962 Roman Missal, in accordance with Pope Benedict XVI's indication, the year before, that, "for those faithful or priests who request it, the pastor should allow celebrations in this extraordinary form also in special circumstances such as [...] funerals".

The Glasgow Herald described him in an obituary as "Tall, personable and possessed of impeccable manners, he wore the kilt, promoted tartan, restored castles and as one of only four private heralds in the nation, he appeared on days of great ceremonial in a magnificent tabard."

== Nationalist or secular affiliations ==
- Garioch Pursuivant to the Chief of the Name and Arms of Mar (currently Margaret of Mar, the 30th Countess of Mar)
- Co-founder, Scottish Historic Organs Trust (1991 - his death)
- Co-founder and Chairman, Castles of Scotland Preservation Trust (1985 - his death)
- President, Scottish Military History Society
- Admiral the Viscount Keppel Association
- Patron of the Aboyne Highland Games (1999 - his death)
- President of the 1745 Association/Scottish Military History Society (1991 - his death)
- Convenor of the Monarchist League of Scotland (1993)
- Member of Lloyd's Register (1985 - 2001)
- Member, Council, Royal Stuart Society
- Freeman of the City of London
