= Coppermine Herald =

One of the heralds at the Canadian Heraldic Authority

Badge of Office

Coppermine Herald of Arms is the title of one of the officers of arms at the Canadian Heraldic Authority in Ottawa. The office was created in 2003 and Coppermine Herald is the assistant artist of the Authority. Like the other heralds at the Authority, the name is derived from the Canadian river. The design of the badge of office of Coppermine Herald of Arms was assigned on 15 June 2005. The ulu in the badge is a traditional Inuit knife that has existed for over 4000 years. It honours the northern people and land. Its copper colour refers to the title Coppermine Herald. Since the creation of the office, it has been held by Catherine Fitzpatrick.

== See also ==
- Heraldry
- Herald
- Royal Heraldry Society of Canada
