= Private officer of arms =

Heraldic official appointed by a noble house

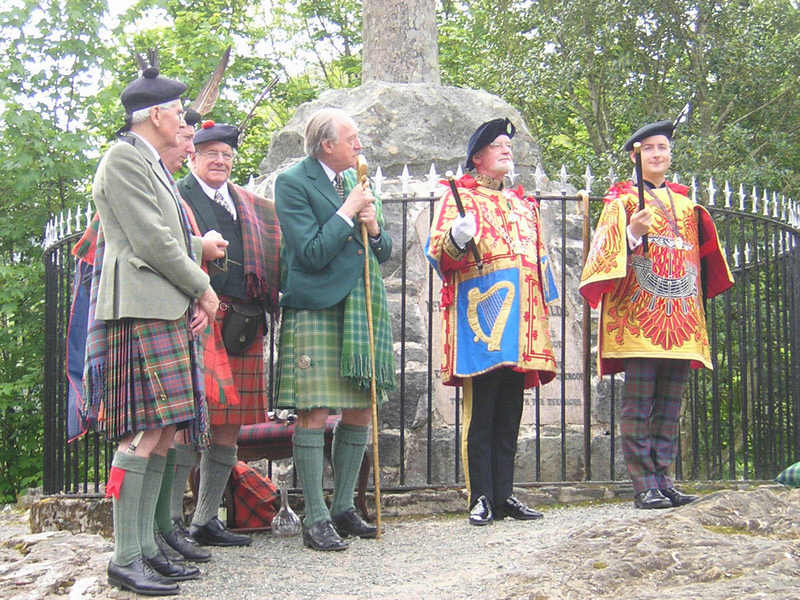
The Honourable Adam Bruce (far right) at his installation as Finlaggan Pursuivant of Arms of Clan Donald. Finlaggan wears a tabard emblazoned with the arms of his employer, the Chief of Clan Donald.

A private officer of arms is one of the heralds and pursuivants appointed by great noble houses to handle all heraldic and genealogical questions.

== History ==
Since the development of heraldry in the Middle Ages and the rise of officers of arms, noble families have appointed heralds and pursuivants to look after the correct marshalling of their coats of arms and research genealogical links. Many noblemen in Britain retained heralds from about 1170 onwards, as did important knights such as Sir John Chandos. The heralds were originally concerned with war and tournaments and identifying people by their arms. As such, they naturally developed an interest in genealogy. Formerly, the Lord of the Isles had Ross Herald and Islay Pursuivant. On the forfeiture of the Lordship these became, and remain, Royal Officers. In 1725, Blanc Coursier Herald was created to serve Prince William, Duke of Cumberland, and the tabard of the office includes Prince Williams differenced arms. Today, most officers of arms are employed by state heraldic authorities. There are, however, some private officers that still exist.

== Current officers in Scotland ==
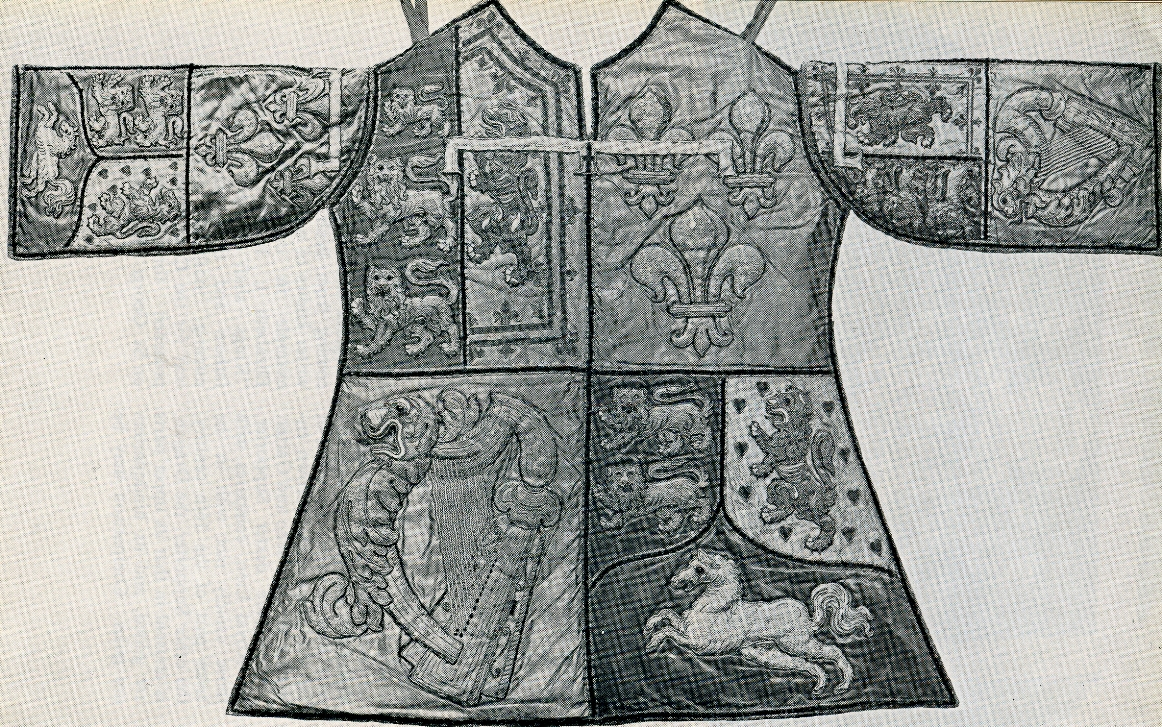
The tabard of Blanc Coursier Herald John Anstis created in 1727.

In Scotland, there are four private pursuivants of arms that are recognized by the Court of the Lord Lyon King of Arms. These are appointed by clan chiefs to look after matters of clan heraldry and genealogy. The five currently recognized private Scottish pursuivants are listed below:

- Slains Pursuivant, appointed by the Chief of the Name and Arms of Hay – currently the Earl of Erroll, Lord High Constable of Scotland
- Garioch Pursuivant, appointed by the Chief of the Name and Arms of Mar – currently the Countess of Mar
- Endure Pursuivant, appointed by the Chief of the Name and Arms of Lindsay – currently the Earl of Crawford & Balcarres
- Finlaggan Pursuivant, appointed by the Chief of the Name and Arms of Macdonald and High Chief of Clan Donald – currently the Lord Macdonald of Slate. This post was revived, after five centuries in August 2005

== King of Arms of the Royal House of the Two Sicilies ==
On 10 November 1962 Fernando Muñoz Altea was appointed King of Arms of the Royal House of the Two Sicilies by the claimant Prince Ranieri, Duke of Castro, and Head of the Royal House. The Kingdom of Sicily did not have actual heralds (to grant coats of arms and issue certificates of nobility) in recent times, but rather a Commission for Titles of Nobility based in Naples until 1861. This commission concerned itself with administration of certain nobiliary institutions and recognition of titles of nobility. Muñoz Altea continued this tradition as a Private Officer of Arms of the Royal House. In addition to his office as King of Arms, Muñoz Altea was a delegate of the Sacred Military Constantinian Order of Saint George. He died in Mexico City on March 2, 2018.

== See also ==
- Heraldry
- Officer of Arms
- King of Arms
- Herald of Arms
- Pursuivant of Arms
- The College of Arms
- The Court of the Lord Lyon
- The Canadian Heraldic Authority
- The Chief Herald of Ireland
