= Herald =

Officer of arms

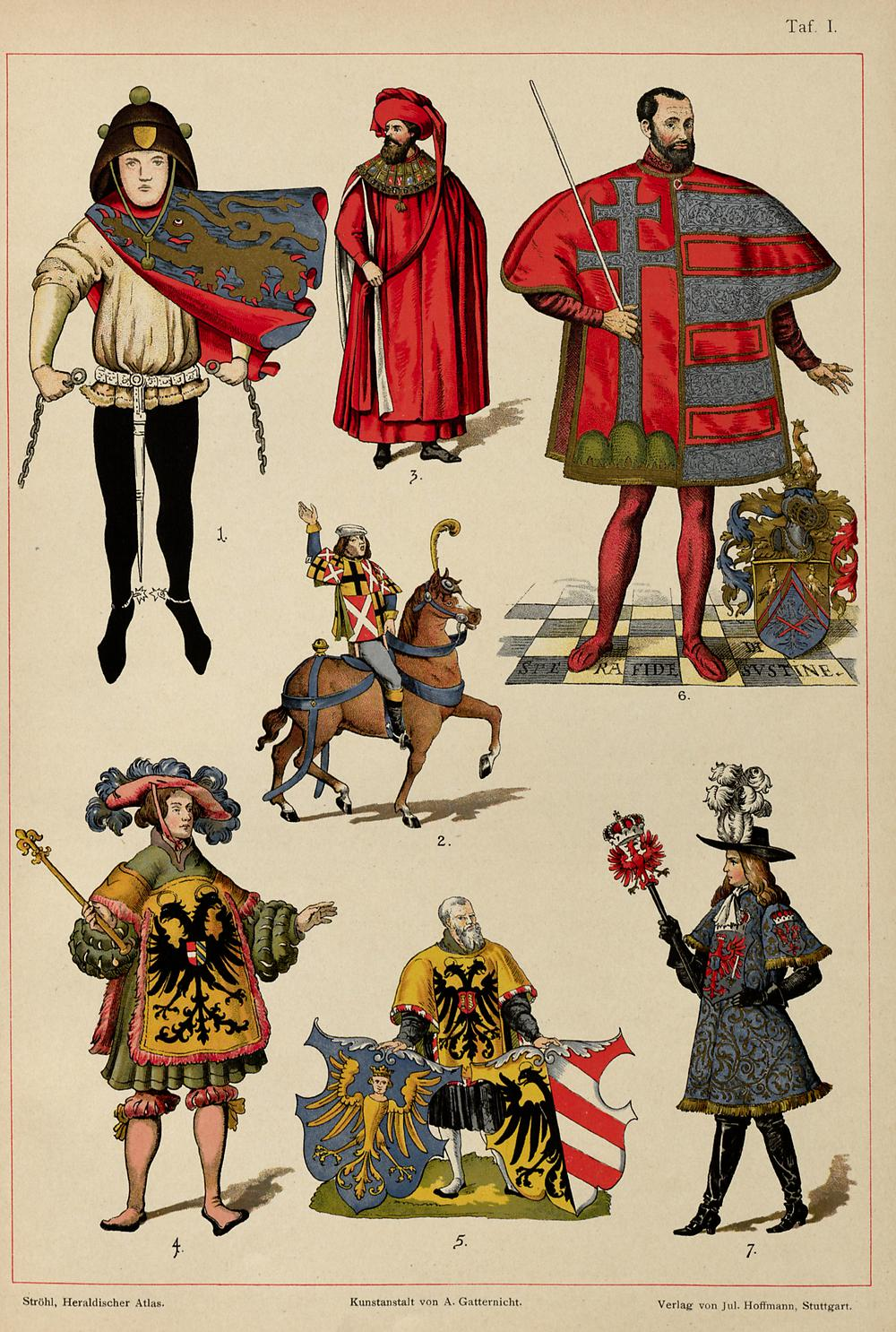
Pictures of heralds from the 14th–17th century, from H. Ströhl's Heraldischer Atlas

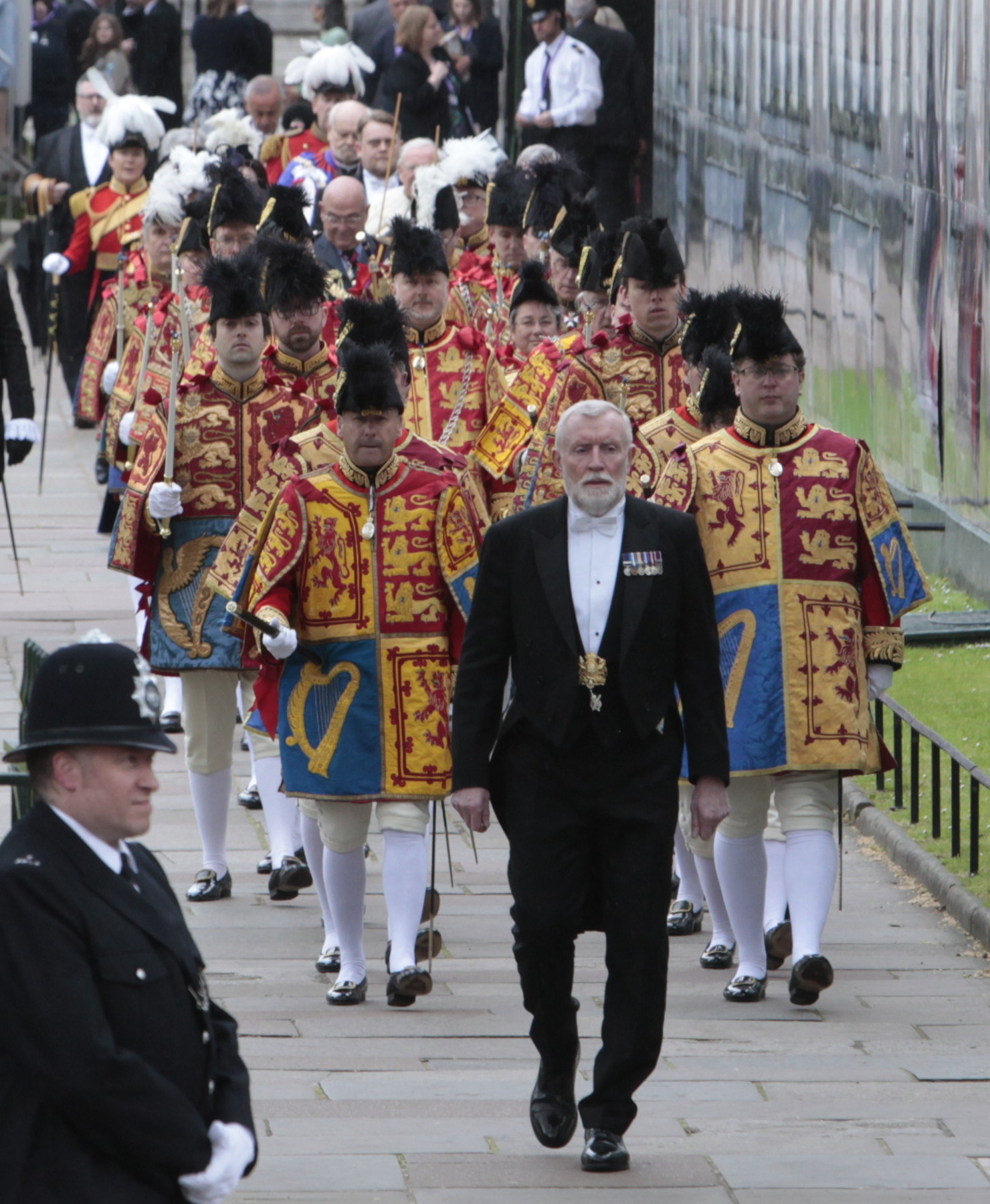
English and Scottish heralds, wearing tabards, in procession during the Coronation of Charles III and Camilla (2023).

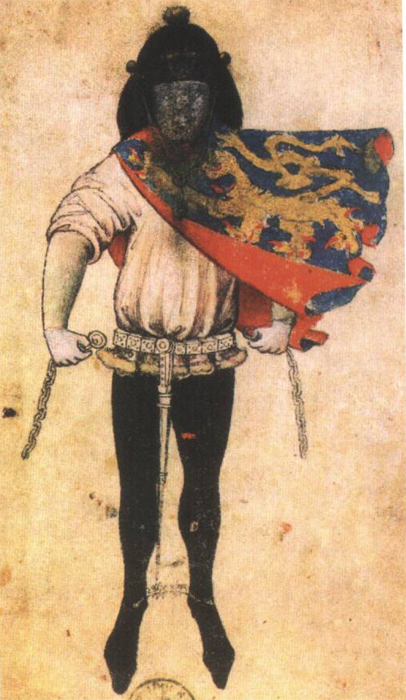
Herald Gelre of the Duke of Gueldres (around 1380)

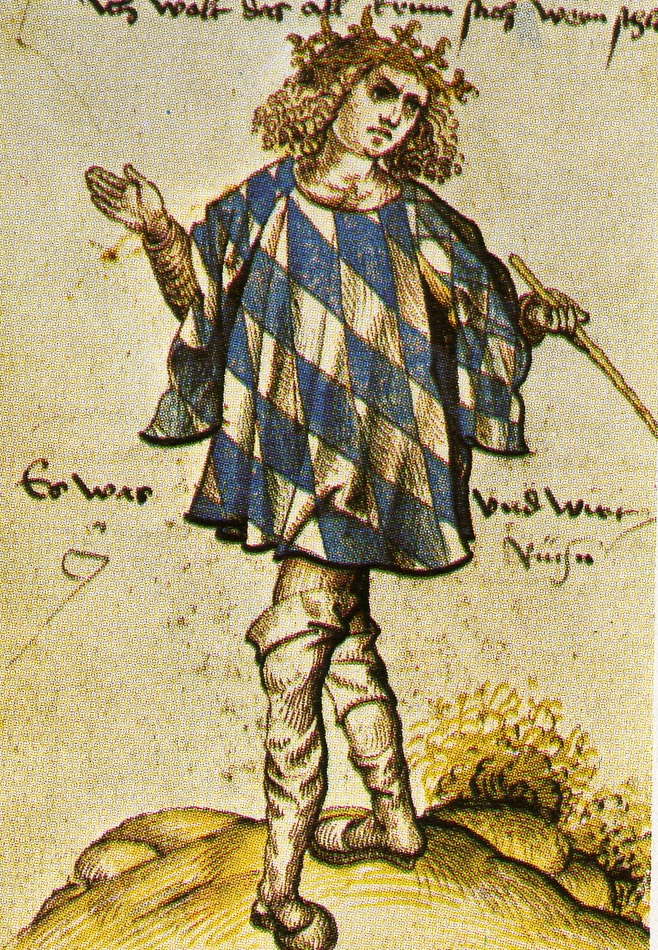
Bavarian herald Jörg Rugen wearing a tabard of the Coat of arms of Bavaria, around 1510.

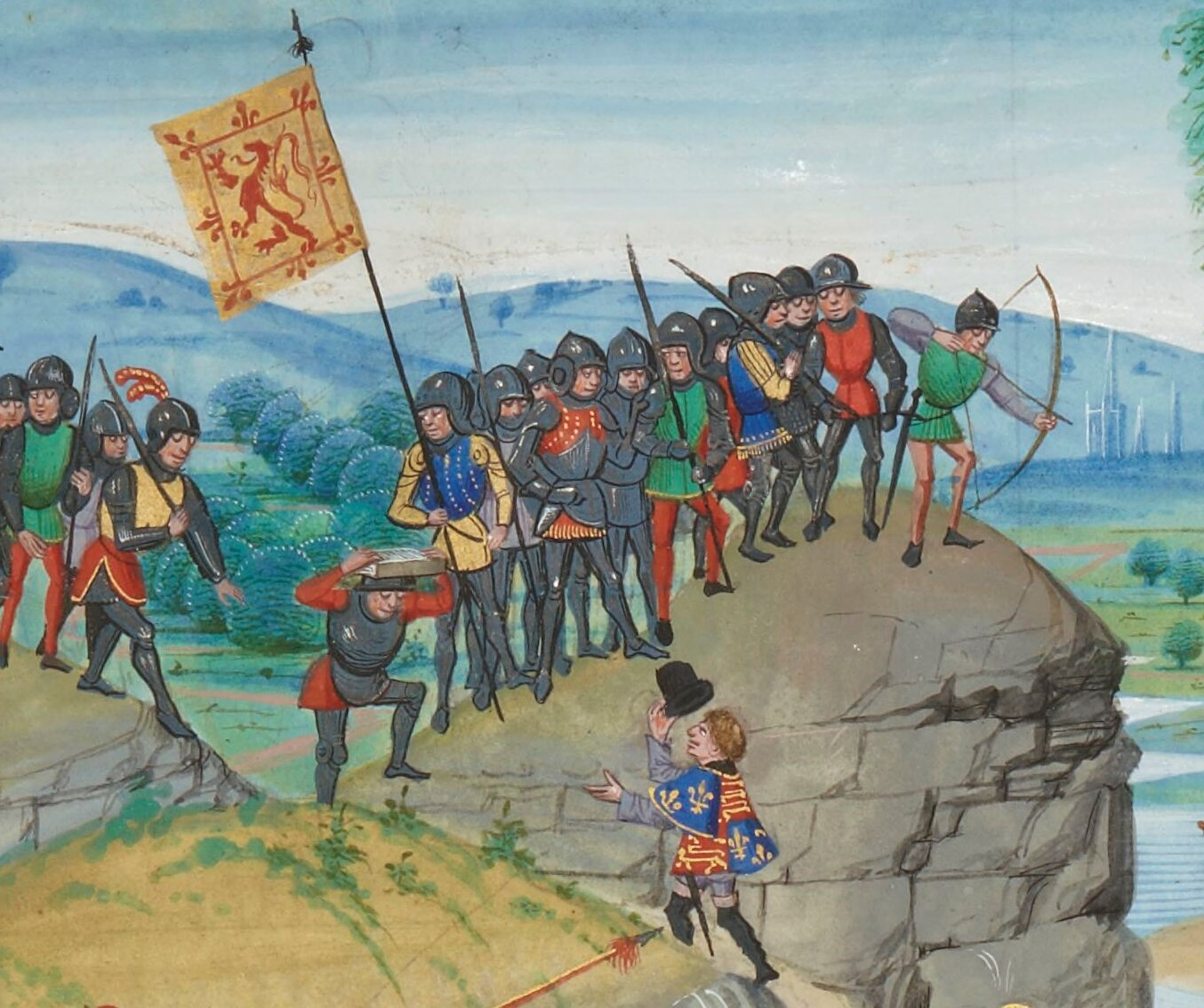
A 14th-century illustration showing an English herald approaching Scottish soldiers – an incident of the Anglo-Scottish Wars

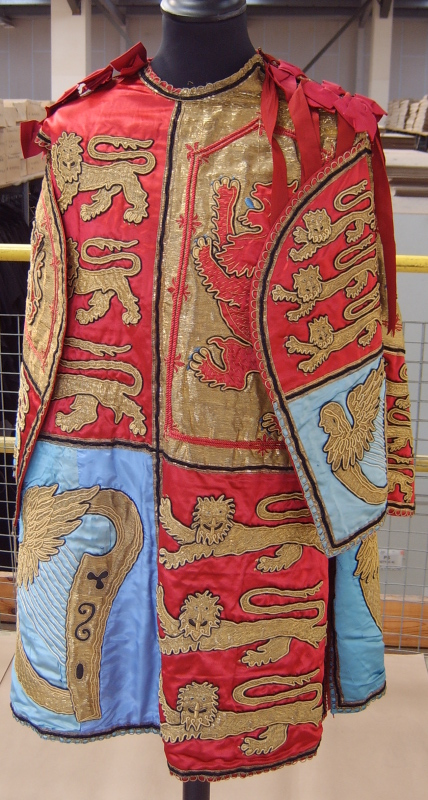
Tabard worn by an English herald in the College of Arms (Note: Similar tabards are also worn by Officers Extraordinary, who are not formally members of the College of Arms, but take part in ceremonial occasions. Scottish heralds under the authority of Lord Lyon King of Arms also wear tabards, but these display the current royal arms of Scotland.)

A herald, or a herald of arms, is an officer of arms, ranking between pursuivant and king of arms. The title is commonly applied more broadly to all officers of arms.

Heralds were originally messengers sent by monarchs or noblemen to convey messages or proclamations—in this sense being the predecessors of modern diplomats.

Like other officers of arms, a herald would often wear a surcoat, called a tabard, decorated with the coat of arms of his master. It was possibly due to their role in managing the tournaments of the Late Middle Ages that heralds came to be associated with the regulation of the knights' coats of arms. Heralds have been employed by kings and large landowners, principally as messengers and ambassadors. Heralds were required to organise, announce and referee the contestants at a tournament. This practice of heraldry became increasingly important and further regulated over the years, and in several countries around the world it is still overseen by heralds. In the United Kingdom heralds are still called upon at times to read proclamations publicly; for which they still wear tabards emblazoned with the royal coat of arms.

There are active official heralds today in several countries, including the United Kingdom, Ireland, Canada, and the Republic of South Africa. In England and Scotland most heralds are full-time employees of the sovereign and are called "Heralds of Arms in Ordinary". Temporary appointments can be made of "Heralds of Arms Extraordinary". These are often appointed for a specific major state occasions, such as a coronation. The Canadian Heraldic Authority has created the position of "Herald of Arms Emeritus" with which to honor long-serving or distinguished heraldists. In Scotland, some Scottish clan chiefs, the heads of great noble houses, still appoint private officers of arms to handle cases of heraldic or genealogical importance of clan members, although these are usually pursuivants.

In addition, many orders of chivalry have heralds attached to them. These heralds may have some heraldic duties but are more often merely ceremonial in nature. Heralds which were primarily ceremonial in nature, especially after the decline of chivalry, were also appointed in various nations for specific events such as a coronation as additions to the pageantry of these occasions. In the Netherlands, heralds are appointed for the Dutch monarch's inauguration where they wore their tabards until 1948; these heralds proclaim the inauguration ceremony to have been completed to those inside and outside the Nieuwe Kerk.

== English Heralds ==
=== English Heralds of Arms in Ordinary ===
- Richmond Herald of Arms in Ordinary
- Chester Herald of Arms in Ordinary
- Lancaster Herald of Arms in Ordinary
- York Herald of Arms in Ordinary
- Somerset Herald of Arms in Ordinary
- Windsor Herald of Arms in Ordinary

=== English Heralds of Arms Extraordinary ===
- Arundel Herald of Arms Extraordinary
- Beaumont Herald of Arms Extraordinary
- Maltravers Herald of Arms Extraordinary
- New Zealand Herald of Arms Extraordinary
- Norfolk Herald of Arms Extraordinary
- Surrey Herald of Arms Extraordinary
- Wales Herald of Arms Extraordinary

== Scottish Heralds ==
=== Scottish Heralds of Arms in Ordinary ===
- Albany Herald of Arms in Ordinary
- Marchmont Herald of Arms in Ordinary
- Rothesay Herald of Arms in Ordinary
- Snawdoun Herald of Arms in Ordinary

=== Scottish Heralds of Arms Extraordinary ===
- Angus Herald of Arms Extraordinary
- Islay Herald of Arms in Extraordinary
- Orkney Herald of Arms Extraordinary
- Ross Herald of Arms Extraordinary

== Canadian Heralds ==
=== Canadian Heralds of Arms In Ordinary ===
- Chief Herald of Canada
- Assiniboine Herald of Arms in Ordinary
- Athabaska Herald of Arms in Ordinary
- Coppermine Herald of Arms in Ordinary
- Fraser Herald of Arms in Ordinary
- Miramichi Herald of Arms in Ordinary
- Saguenay Herald of Arms in Ordinary
- Saint-Laurent Herald of Arms in Ordinary

=== Canadian Heralds of Arms Extraordinary ===
- Albion Herald of Arms Extraordinary
- Capilano Herald of Arms Extraordinary
- Cowichan Herald of Arms Extraordinary
- Dauphin Herald of Arms Extraordinary
- Niagara Herald of Arms Extraordinary
- Rouge Herald of Arms Extraordinary

=== Canadian Heralds of Arms Emeritus ===
- Outaouais Herald of Arms Emeritus
- Rideau Herald of Arms Emeritus

== Indian Empire Herald of Arms Extraordinary ==
- Delhi Herald of Arms Extraordinary

== Gallery ==
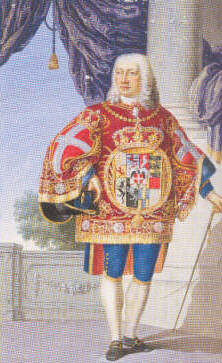
Duchy of Savoy (1416-1847) - (Italy)

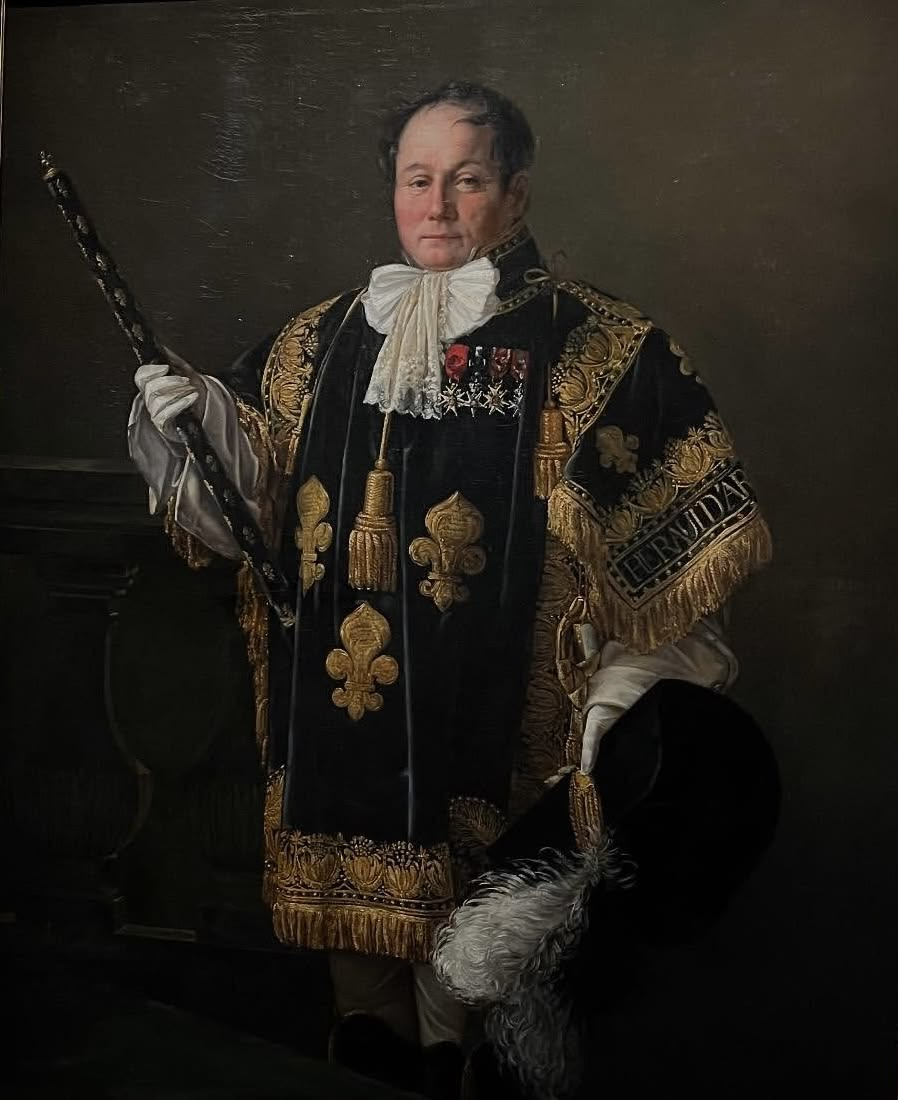
(France)

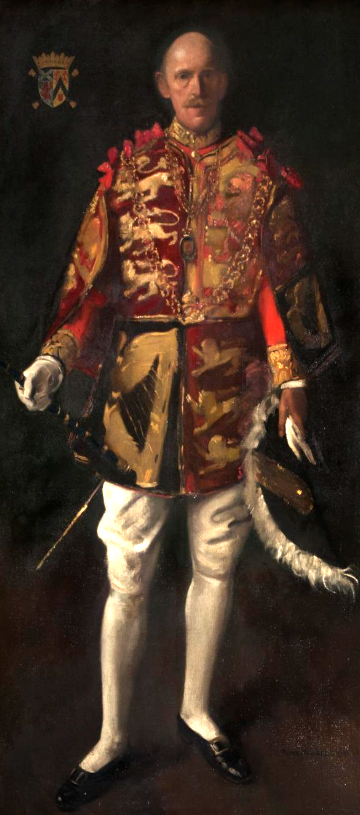
United Kingdom

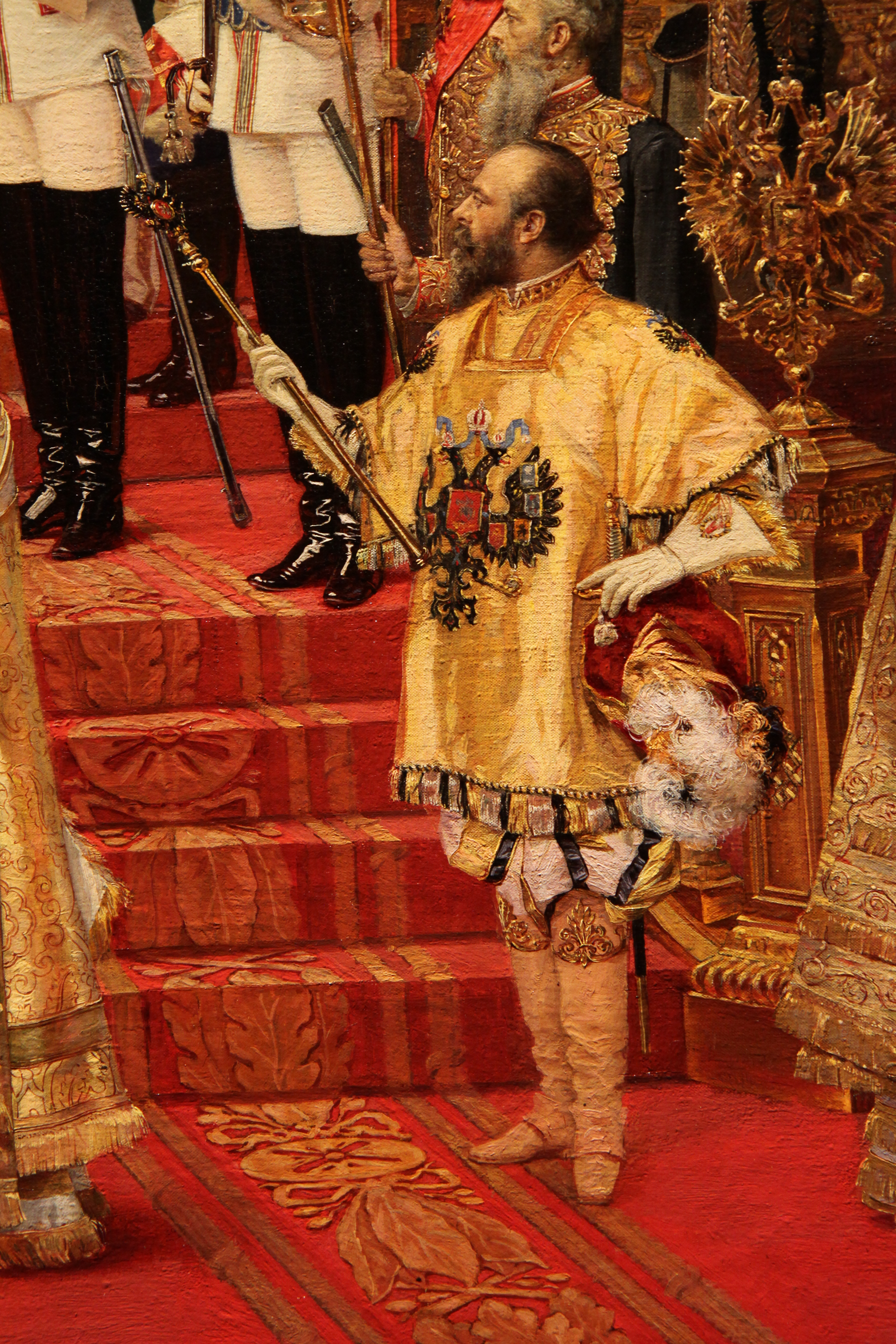
(Russia)

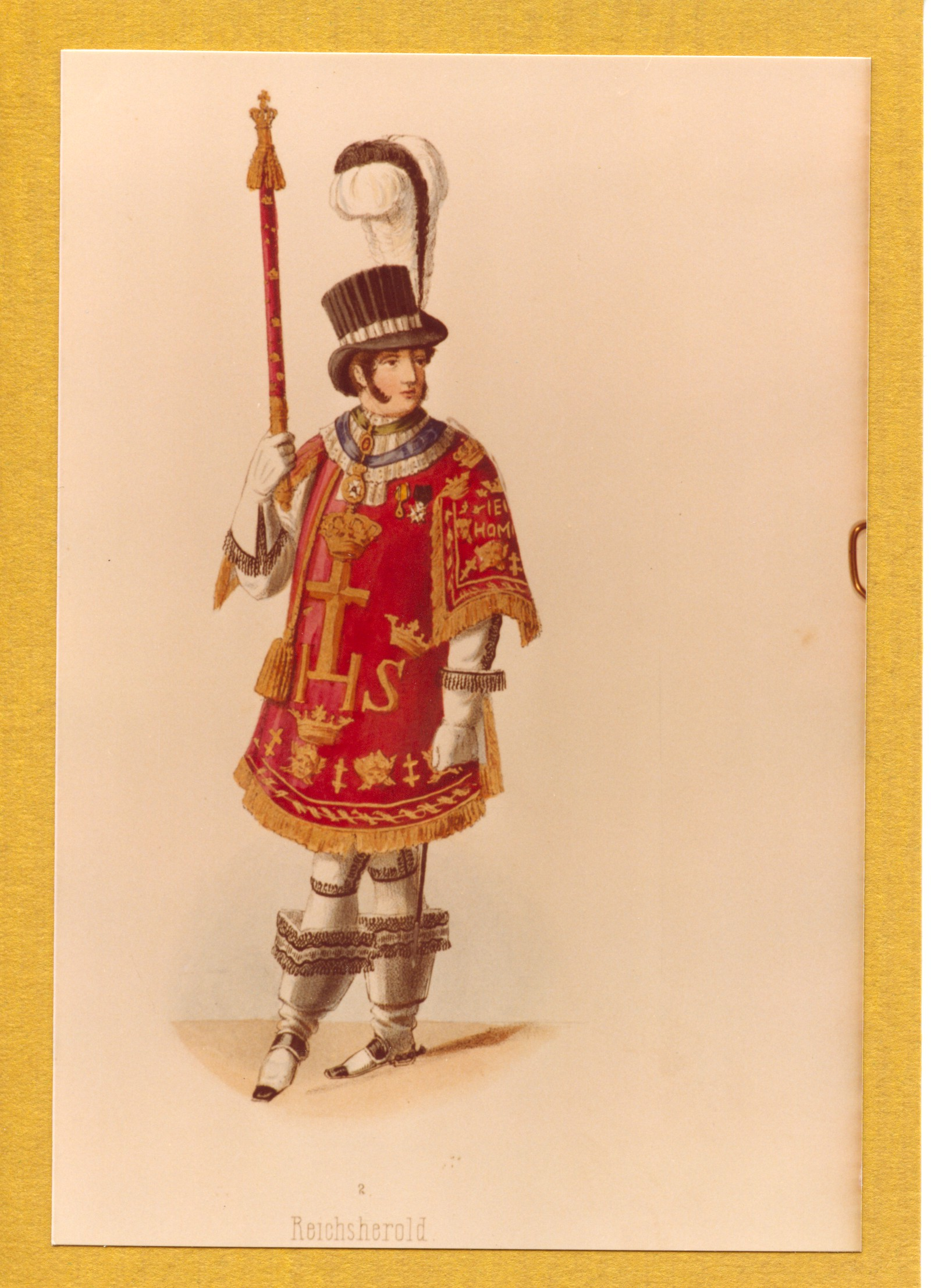
Sweden)

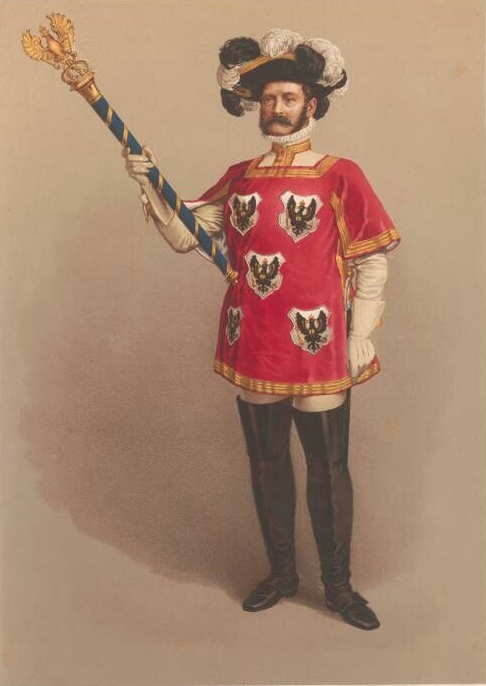
(Prussia) (1701-1918)

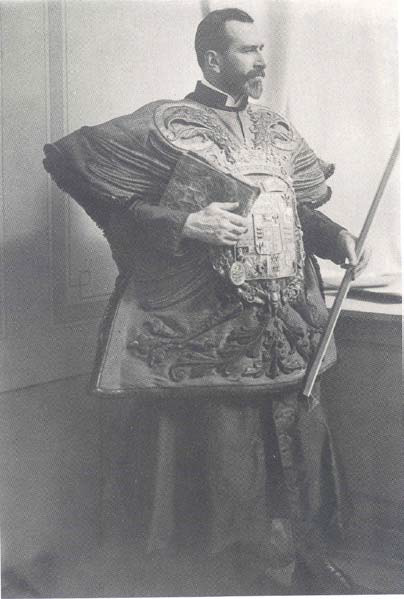
Holy Roman Empire (800-1806)

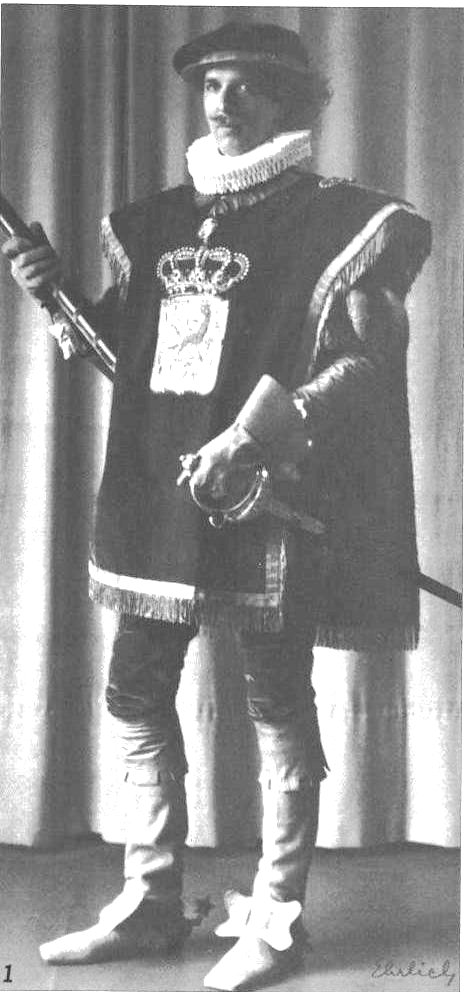
Netherlands

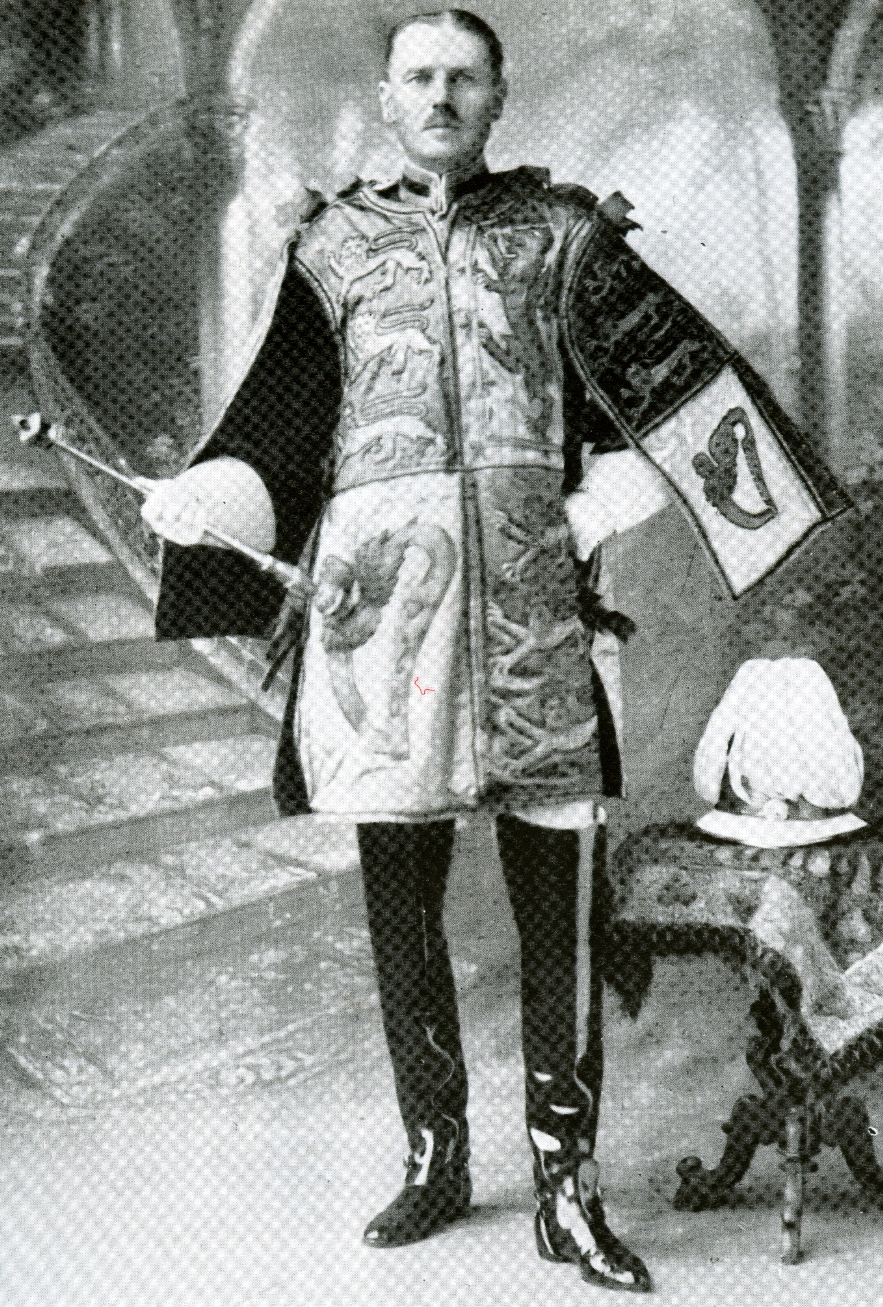
(India)

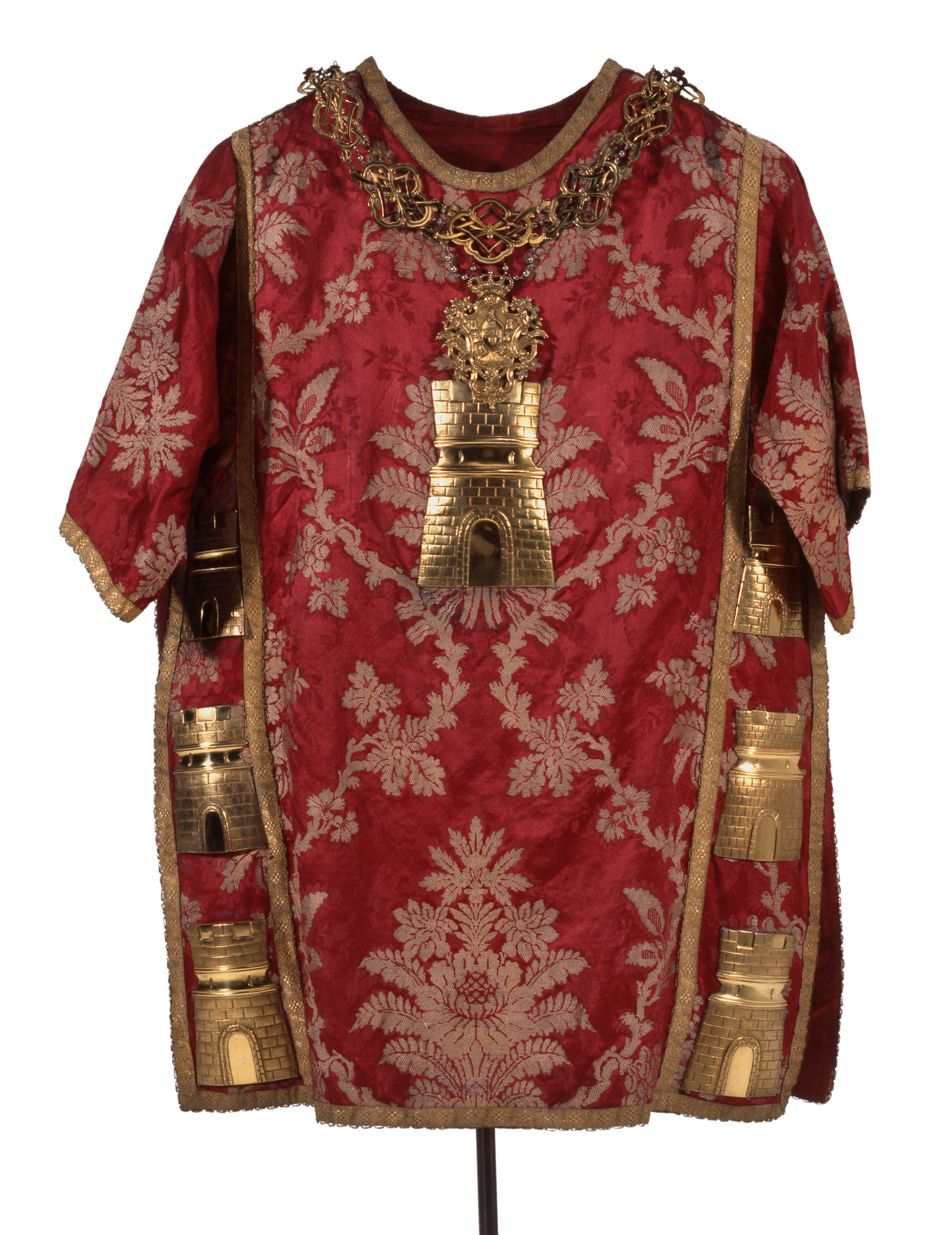
(Portugal)

== See also ==
- Herald (Ancient Egypt)
- The Court of the Lord Lyon
- Town crier
