= Garioch Pursuivant =

Private officer of arms

Garioch Pursuivant of Arms is a private officer of arms appointed by the Chief of the Name and Arms of Mar – currently Margaret of Mar, 31st Countess of Mar. There was a Garioch Pursuivant to the Earl of Mar from at least as early as 1503. From 1975 to 1986, the post was held by John George Esq, Kintyre Pursuivant 1986–2000. From 1986 to 2008, the post was held by David Gordon Allen d'Aldecamb Lumsden, Feudal Baron of Cushnie Lumsden, who was one of the patrons of the Aboyne Highland Games; and he was succeeded by his nephew, Hugh David Paul de Laurier Esq. In January 2013, Lt-Cmdr Laurence of Mar, MA, FSAScot, ATCL, RN was appointed Garioch Pursuivant.
