= Officer of arms =

State officer for heraldic, armorial or ceremonial duties

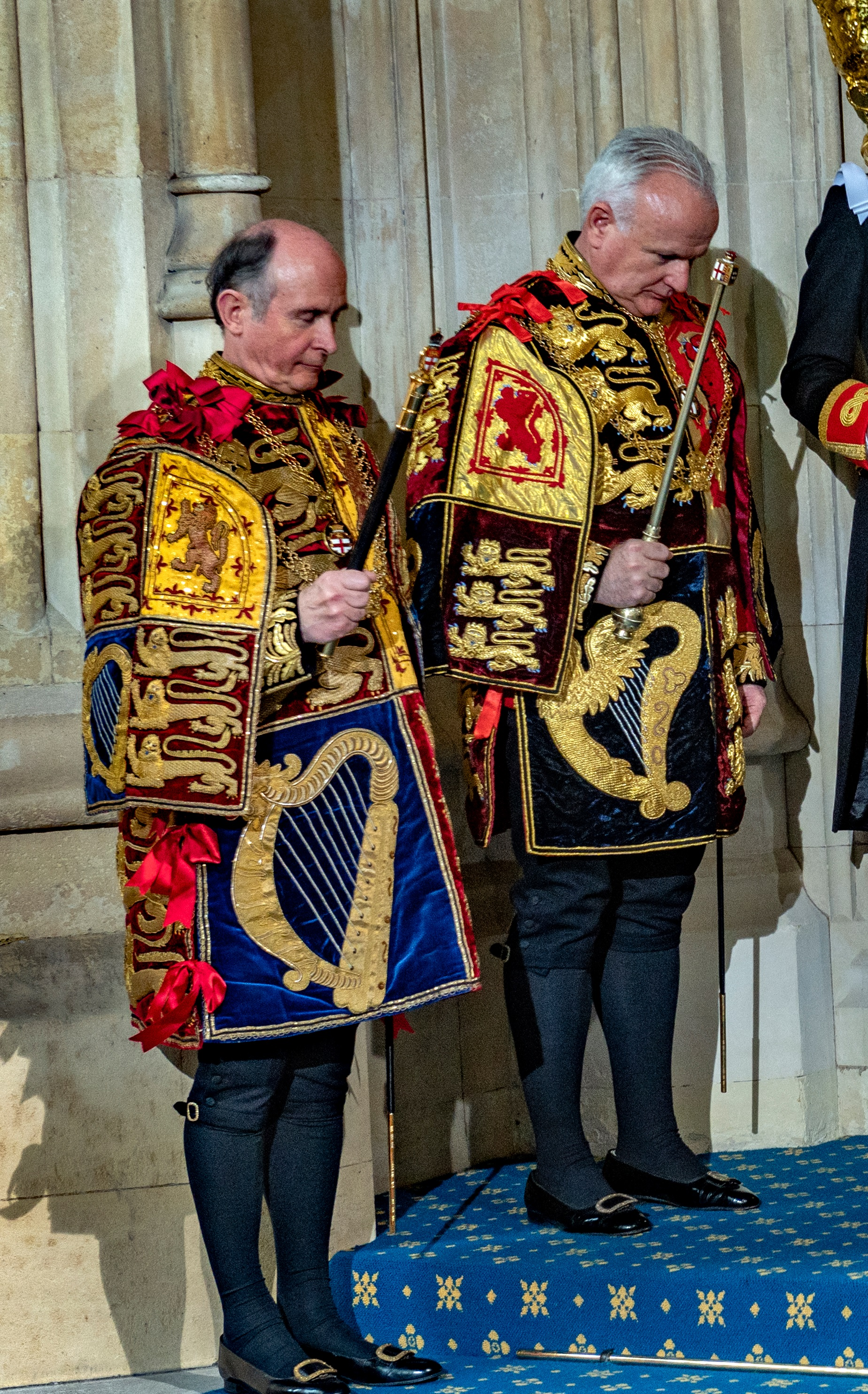
Kings of arms Timothy Duke and David Vines White in 2022

An officer of arms is a person appointed by a sovereign or state with authority to perform one or more of the following functions:

- to control and initiate armorial matters;
- to arrange and participate in ceremonies of state;
- to conserve and interpret heraldic and genealogical records.

== By country ==
The medieval practice of appointing heralds or pursuivants to the establishment of a noble household is still common in European countries, particularly those in which there is no official heraldic control or authority. Such appointments are also still made in Scotland, where four private officers of arms exist. These appointments are all purely advisory.

=== Canada ===
Arms and batons of office of the Chief Herald of Canada

Work completed by the Canadian Heraldic Authority is conducted by officers known as the herald of arms. The organization is led by the Herald Chancellor of Canada and the Chief Herald of Canada, the latter serving as the director for the heraldic authority. In addition to the Chief Herald, other herald of arms includes the Athabaska Herald, Assiniboine Herald, Coppermine Herald, Fraser Herald, Miramichi Herald, Saguenay Herald, and the Saint-Laurent Herald.

In addition to the herald in ordinary, several retired heralds and notable individuals were named to the honorary position of Herald Emeritus or Heralds Extraordinary. This includes the Albion Herald Extraordinary, Capilano Herald Extraordinary, Cowichan Herald Extraordinary, Dauphin Herald Extraordinary, Niagara Herald Extraordinary, Rouge Herald Extraordinary, Outaouais Herald Emeritus, and the Rideau Herald Emeritus.

=== Ireland ===
In the Republic of Ireland, matters armorial and genealogical come within the authority of an officer designated the Chief Herald of Ireland. The legal basis for Ireland's heraldic authority, and therefore all grants since 1943, has been questioned by the Attorney General, therefore, on 8 May 2006, Senator Brendan Ryan introduced the Genealogy & Heraldry Bill, 2006, in Seanad Éireann (Irish Senate) to remedy this situation and legitimise actions since the transfer of power from the Ulster King of Arms.

=== Netherlands ===
In the Netherlands, officers of arms do not exist as permanent functions. Private heraldry is not legislated, and state heraldry and the heraldry of the nobility is regulated by the private High Council of Nobility.

However, two kings of arms and two or four heralds of arms have figured during royal inauguration ceremonies. These were usually members of the High Council of Nobility. During the inaugurations of Wilhelmina and Juliana, the kings of arms wore nineteenth-century-style court dress, whereas the heralds wore tabards. All officers carried rods and wore chains of office. In the inauguration of Queen Beatrix in 1980, members of the resistance posed as the ceremonial officers of arms, with Erik Hazelhoff Roelfzema being the elder king of arms. Like most other participants in the pageant, the officers of arms were no longer wearing ceremonial dress, but white tie instead. The senior king of arms proclaims the king or queen to be inaugurated after he or she has sworn allegiance to the constitution. The heralds step outside the New Church in Amsterdam, where the inauguration ceremony is held, to announce this fact to the people gathered outside the church.

=== United Kingdom ===
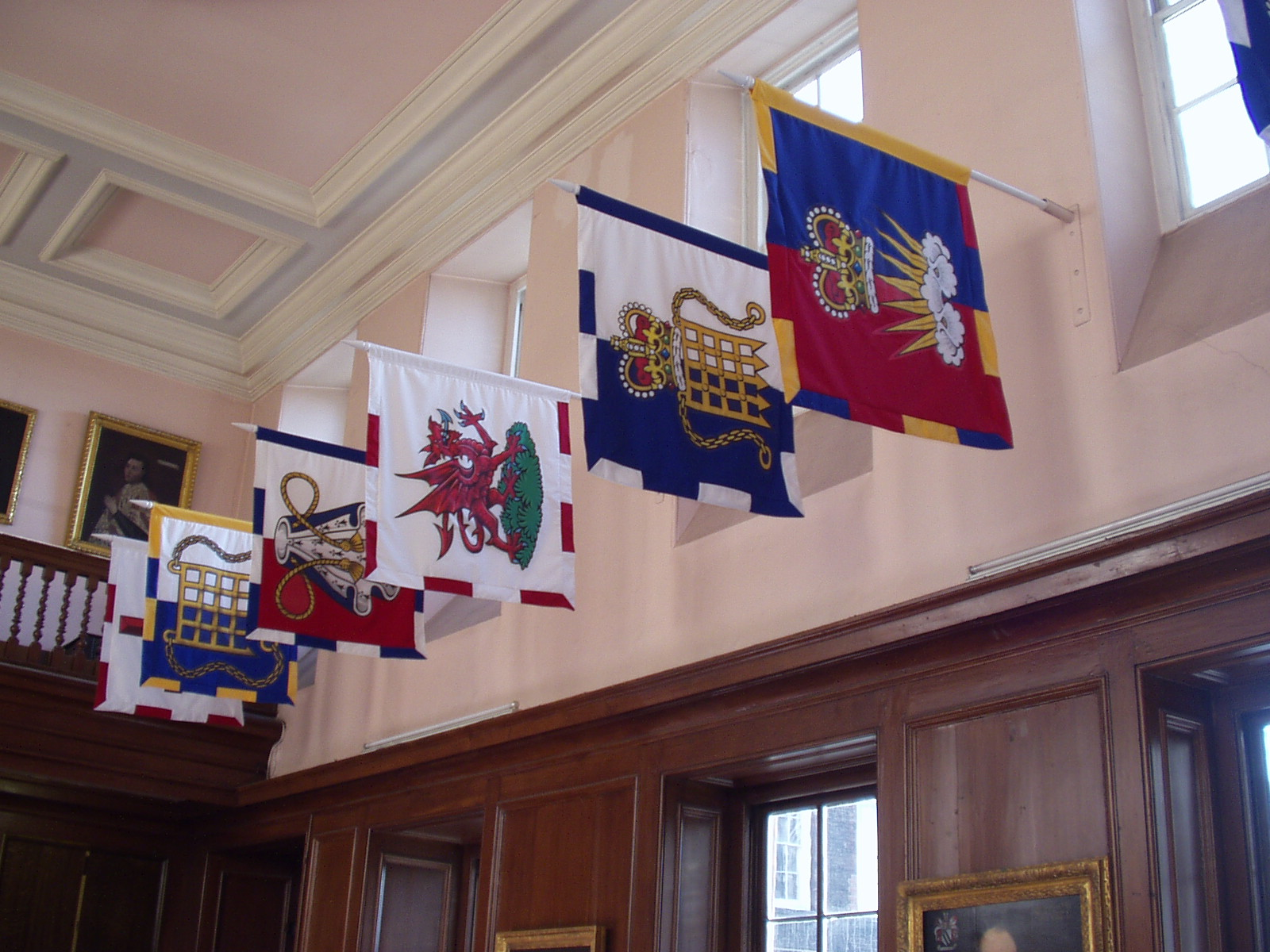
Banners bearing heraldic badges of several officers of arms at the College of Arms in London

In England, the authority of the thirteen officers of arms in ordinary, who form the corporation of the kings, heralds and pursuivants of arms (College of Arms), extends throughout the Commonwealth, with the exception of Scotland, Canada and South Africa.

Officers of arms are of three ranks: kings of arms, heralds of arms, and pursuivants of arms. Officers of arms whose appointments are of a permanent nature are known as officers of arms in ordinary; those whose appointments are of a temporary or occasional nature are known as officers of arms extraordinary. The officers of arms in ordinary who form the College of Arms are members of the royal household and receive a nominal salary.

In Scotland, the Lord Lyon King of Arms and the Lyon Clerk and Keeper of the Records control armorial matters within a strict legal framework not enjoyed by their fellow officers of arms in London, and the court which is a part of Scotland's criminal jurisdiction has its own prosecutor, the court's Procurator Fiscal, who is, however, not an officer of arms. Lord Lyon and the Lyon Clerk are appointed by the crown, and, with the Crown's authority, Lyon appoints the other Scottish officers. The officers of arms in Scotland are also members of the royal household.

== See also ==
- Heraldry
- King of Arms
- Herald
- Pursuivant
- Private officer of arms
- College of Arms
- Court of the Lord Lyon
- Canadian Heraldic Authority
- Genealogical Office
- Flemish Heraldic Council
- Imperial count palatine
- Cronista Rey de Armas
- Portugal Rei de Armas
