= Earl of Callendar =

Earl of Callendar was a title in the Peerage of Scotland. It was created in 1641 for James Livingston, 1st Lord Livingston of Almond, a younger son of Alexander Livingston, 1st Earl of Linlithgow, along with the subsidiary title Lord Livingston and Almond. The 4th Earl later inherited the more senior Earldom of Linlithgow from his uncle, with which title the Earldom of Callendar was merged until its forfeiture by attainder in 1716. The seat of the Earls of Callendar was Callendar House in Falkirk.

== Lords Livingston of Almond (1633–1716) ==
- James Livingston, 1st Lord Livingston of Almond (d. 1674) (created Earl of Callendar in 1641)

== Earls of Callendar (1641–1716) ==
- James Livingston, 1st Earl of Callendar (d. 1674)
- Alexander Livingston, 2nd Earl of Callendar (d. 1685)
- Alexander Livingston, 3rd Earl of Callendar (d. 1692)
- James Livingston, 4th Earl of Callendar (d. 1723) (became 5th Earl of Linlithgow in 1695, attainted 1716)

== Family tree ==
Family tree of the Earls of: Callendar, Erroll, Gowrie, Kilmarnock, and Linlithgow

William I de Haya
Feudal Baron of Erroll, c. 1178
William II de Haya fl. 1160–1201; 1st Feudal Baron of Erroll
David de la Hay; 2nd Feudal Baron of Erroll	William III de la Hay	John de la Hay	Thomas de la Hay	Robert de la Hay	Malcolm de la Hay
Gilbert I de la Hay d. c. 1263; 3rd Feudal Baron of Erroll
Nicholas de la Haye fl. 13th century 4th Feudal Baron of Erroll
Gilbert II de la Hay d. 1333; 5th Feudal Baron of Erroll; Lord High Constable of Scotland	Hugh de la Haye fl. 13th–14th century
Nicholas de la Haye d. 1332
David de la Hay c. 1318 – 1346; 6th Feudal Baron of Erroll; Lord High Constable of Scotland	Robert II; 1316–1390; King of Scotland
Thomas de la Hay c. 1342 – 1406; 7th Feudal Baron of Erroll; Lord High Constable of Scotland	Elizabeth Stewart	Robert III c. 1337 – 1406; King of Scotland
Lord Hay, a. 1429/1430
William de la Haye d. 1436; 1st Lord Hay	Alice de la Haye m. William Hay of Lochorwart and Yester d. 1421
Gilbert of the Haye d. 1436	James I 1394–1437; King of Scotland	David Hay of Lochorwart and Yester d. a. 1478
Earl of Erroll, 1453	Lord Hay of Yester, 1487/1488
William Hay; 1423–1462; 1st Earl of Erroll	Annabella of Scotland c. 1436 – 1509
Nicholas Hay c. 1436 – 1470; 2nd Earl of Erroll	William Hay; 1449–1507; 3rd Earl of Erroll	Isabel Gordon
William Hay; 1470 – 1513; 4th Earl of Erroll	Thomas Hay d. 1513
William Hay d. 1522; 5th Earl of Erroll
William Hay d. 1541; 6th Earl of Erroll	George Hay c. 1508 – 1573; 7th Earl of Erroll
Jean Hay	Andrew Hay, 8th Earl of Erroll d. 1585; 8th Earl of Erroll
Earl of Linlithgow, 1600
Francis Hay; 1564–1631; 9th Earl of Erroll	George Hay	Helen Hay c. 1552 – 1627	Alexander Livingston c. 1552 – 1627; 1st Earl of Linlithgow
Earl of Callendar, 1641
William Hay a. 1597 – 1636; 10th Earl of Erroll	Sir Andrew Hay	Alexander Livingston d. 1648; 2nd Earl of Linlithgow	James Livingston c. 1590s – 1674; 1st Earl of Callendar
Earl of Kilmarnock, 1661
Gilbert Hay; 1631–1674; 11th Earl of Erroll	John Hay d. 1704; 12th Earl of Erroll	George Livingston; 1616–1690; 3rd Earl of Linlithgow	Alexander Livingston d. 1685; 2nd Earl of Callendar	William Boyd; 1646–1692; 1st Earl of Kilmarnock, 10th Lord Boyd
George Livingston d. 1695; 4th Earl of Linlithgow	Alexander Livingston d. 1692; 3rd Earl of Callendar	William Boyd; 1663/1664 – 1692; 2nd Earl of Kilmarnock
Charles Hay c. 1680 – 1717; 13th Earl of Erroll	Mary Hay d. 1758; 14th Countess of Erroll	Margaret Hay d. 1723	James Livingston d. 1723; 5th Earl of Linlithgow, 4th Earl of Callendar	William Boyd; 1683/1684 – 1717; 3rd Earl of Kilmarnock
Earldoms of Linlithgow and of Callendar attainted, 1716
James Livingston; 1710–1715 styled Lord Livingston	Anne Livingston; 1709–1747	William Boyd; 1705–1746; 4th Earl of Kilmarnock
Earldom of Kilmarnock forfeit, 1746
James Hay d. 1778; 15th Earl of Erroll	George III; 1738–1820; King of Great Britain / the United Kingdom
George Hay d. 1798; 16th Earl of Erroll	William Hay d. 1819; 17th Earl of Erroll	William IV; 1765–1837; King of the United Kingdom	Edward; 1767–1820; Duke of Kent and Strathearn
Baron Kilmarnock, 1831
William George Hay; 1801–1846; 18th Earl of Erroll, 1st Baron Kilmarnock	Elizabeth FitzClarence	Victoria; 1819–1901; Queen of the United Kingdom
William Harry Hay; 1823–1891; 19th Earl of Erroll, 2nd Baron Kilmarnock	Agnes Georgiana Elizabeth Hay; 1829–1869	Edward VII; 1841–1910; King of the United Kingdom
Charles Gordon Hay; 1852–1927; 20th Earl of Erroll, 3rd Baron Kilmarnock	Alexander William George Duff; 1849–1912; Duke of Fife	Louise Victoria Alexandra Dagmar; 1867–1931
Victor Alexander Sereld Hay; 1876–1928; 21st Earl of Erroll, 4th Baron Kilmarnock
Josslyn Victor Hay; 1901–1941; 22nd Earl of Erroll, 5th Baron Kilmarnock m. Idina Sackville; 1893–1955	Gilbert Allan Rowland Boyd (né Hay); 1903–1975; 6th Baron of Kilmarnock
Diana Denyse Hay; 1926–1978; 23rd Countess of Erroll	Alastair Ivor Gilbert Boyd; 1927–2009; 7th Baron of Kilmarnock
Merlin Sereld Victor Gilbert Hay b. 1948; 24th Earl of Erroll	Robin Jordan Boyd b. 1941; 8th Baron of Kilmarnock
Thomas William Hay b. 1984 styled Lord Hay	Simon John Boyd b. 1978
Heir to the earldom of Erroll	Heir to the barony of Kilmarnock
