= Earl of Kilmarnock =

British nobility title

- Azure, a fess chequy argent and gules
- Creation date: 17 August 1661
- Created by: Charles II
- Peerage: Peerage of Scotland
- First holder: William Boyd, 1st Earl of Kilmarnock
- Last holder: William Boyd, 4th Earl of Kilmarnock
- Subsidiary titles: Lord Boyd
- Status: Forfeited
- Extinction date: 18 August 1746
- Motto: Confido ("I confide")

Earl of Kilmarnock was a title created twice in the Peerage of Scotland for the Boyd family. It was first created in 1454 for Robert Boyd, Great Chamberlain of Scotland. It was created a second time in 1661 for William Boyd, 10th Lord Boyd. Both titles were forfeited in 1746.

Thomas Boyd, the elder son of Robert Boyd, 1st Lord Boyd—and father of the second one—was created Earl of Arran in 1467, but both titles were forfeit in 1469. Considerable confusion exists over the numbering of the Lords Boyd; this article follows the numbering used in the Oxford Dictionary of National Biography. (Note: Balfour 1904, p. 155 Notes that considerable confusion exists as to the numbering of the Lords Boyd. In The Scots Peerage Balfour's Robert, 5th Lord Boyd is considered the 3rd Lord, though in the Dictionary National Bibliography (Rigg 1886, pp. 96, 97), as in Douglas, "he is, for some cause, called the fourth Lord, though, if the attainder is not reckoned (whereby three persons, viz. (1) the Earl of Arran (living 1472); (2) James Boyd (died 1484), son and heir of the Earl of Arran; and (3) Alexander Boyd (living 1505), uncle and heir of the said James, were excluded from the succession), he would apparently have been sixth Lord", (Douglas see p. 399, note 6). Balfour states that it now known that the Earl of Arran died v.p., and that James was restored as Lord Boyd in 1482, therefore this Robert was apparently de facto fourth Lord. As, however, there is some doubt on the point, the present writer has determined to reckon them as if each head of the family since the original creation of 1454 had actually succeeded to the Peerage, as indeed but for the attainder of 1469 they would have done. Cokayne writing a decade after agreed with Balfour's numbering (Cokayne 1912, p. 160), as does Hewitt the author of the 21st century article "Boyd, Robert, fifth Lord Boyd (c.1517–1590)" in the Oxford Dictionary of National Biography (Hewitt 2004).)

The 4th Earl of Kilmarnock was the father of the 15th Earl of Erroll. The Kilmarnock title was revived in 1831 for the latter's grandson, William George Hay, 18th Earl of Erroll, who was created Baron Kilmarnock in the Peerage of the United Kingdom. Since 1941, this title is a separate peerage.

== Ancestors ==
- Robert Boyd (witnessed a charter concerning Irvine, North Ayrshire in 1205).
- Robert Boyd (fought at the Battle of Largs in 1263 in support of the Scottish Crown).
- Sir Robert Boyd, 1st of Kilmarnock (fought at the Battle of Bannockburn in 1314 and captured at the Battle of Halidon Hill in 1333)
- Sir Thomas Boyd, 2nd of Kilmarnock (captured at the Battle of Neville's Cross in 1346)
- Sir Thomas Boyd, 3rd of Kilmarnock (pardoned in 1409 by the Regent Albany for killing Neilson of Dalrymple, a personal enemy)
- Thomas Boyd, 4th of Kilmarnock (d.1432) (hostage for James I of Scotland when he was imprisoned by the English)
- Sir Thomas Boyd, 5th of Kilmarnock (d.1439) (killed Sir Alan Stewart of Darnely in a feud and was himself killed by Stewart's brother at the Battle of Craignaught Hill in 1439)

== Lords Boyd (1454) ==
- Robert Boyd, 1st Lord Boyd (died 1482)
- James Boyd, 2nd Lord Boyd (c. 1469–1484)
- Alexander Boyd, 3rd Lord Boyd (died after 1508)
- Robert Boyd, 4th Lord Boyd (died 1557 or 1558) (confirmed by a charter to the Lordship 1545 or 1546)
- Robert Boyd, 5th Lord Boyd (c. 1517–1590)
- Thomas Boyd, 6th Lord Boyd (c. 1547–1611)
- Robert Boyd, 7th Lord Boyd (1595–1628)
- Robert Boyd, 8th Lord Boyd (c. 1618–1640)
- James Boyd, 9th Lord Boyd (died 1654)
- William Boyd, 10th Lord Boyd (bef. 1646–1692) (created Earl Kilmarnock in 1661)

== Earls of Kilmarnock (1661) ==
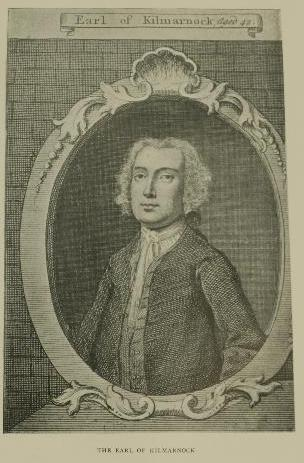
Earl of Kilmarnock

- William Boyd, 1st Earl of Kilmarnock (b.1646–1692)
- William Boyd, 2nd Earl of Kilmarnock (b.1676–1692)
- William Boyd, 3rd Earl of Kilmarnock (b.1692–1717)
- William Boyd, 4th Earl of Kilmarnock (b.1705–1746) (attainted/forfeit 1746)

== Family tree ==
Family tree of the Earls of: Callendar, Erroll, Kilmarnock, and Linlithgow

William I de Haya
Feudal Baron of Erroll, c. 1178
William II de Haya fl. 1160–1201; 1st Feudal Baron of Erroll
David de la Hay; 2nd Feudal Baron of Erroll	William III de la Hay	John de la Hay	Thomas de la Hay	Robert de la Hay	Malcolm de la Hay
Gilbert I de la Hay d. c. 1263; 3rd Feudal Baron of Erroll
Nicholas de la Haye fl. 13th century 4th Feudal Baron of Erroll
Gilbert II de la Hay d. 1333; 5th Feudal Baron of Erroll; Lord High Constable of Scotland	Hugh de la Haye fl. 13th–14th century
Nicholas de la Haye d. 1332
David de la Hay c. 1318 – 1346; 6th Feudal Baron of Erroll; Lord High Constable of Scotland	Robert II; 1316–1390; King of Scotland
Thomas de la Hay c. 1342 – 1406; 7th Feudal Baron of Erroll; Lord High Constable of Scotland	Elizabeth Stewart	Robert III c. 1337 – 1406; King of Scotland
Lord Hay, a. 1429/1430
William de la Haye d. 1436; 1st Lord Hay	Alice de la Haye m. William Hay of Lochorwart and Yester d. 1421
Gilbert of the Haye d. 1436	James I 1394–1437; King of Scotland	David Hay of Lochorwart and Yester d. a. 1478
Earl of Erroll, 1453	Lord Hay of Yester, 1487/1488
William Hay; 1423–1462; 1st Earl of Erroll	Annabella of Scotland c. 1436 – 1509
Nicholas Hay c. 1436 – 1470; 2nd Earl of Erroll	William Hay; 1449–1507; 3rd Earl of Erroll	Isabel Gordon
William Hay; 1470 – 1513; 4th Earl of Erroll	Thomas Hay d. 1513
William Hay d. 1522; 5th Earl of Erroll
William Hay d. 1541; 6th Earl of Erroll	George Hay c. 1508 – 1573; 7th Earl of Erroll
Jean Hay	Andrew Hay, 8th Earl of Erroll d. 1585; 8th Earl of Erroll
Earl of Linlithgow, 1600
Francis Hay; 1564–1631; 9th Earl of Erroll	George Hay	Helen Hay c. 1552 – 1627	Alexander Livingston c. 1552 – 1627; 1st Earl of Linlithgow
Lord Livingston of Almond, 1633; Earl of Callendar, 1641
William Hay a. 1597 – 1636; 10th Earl of Erroll	Sir Andrew Hay	Alexander Livingston d. 1648; 2nd Earl of Linlithgow	James Livingston c. 1590s – 1674; 1st Earl of Callendar, etc.
Earl of Kilmarnock, 1661
Gilbert Hay; 1631–1674; 11th Earl of Erroll	John Hay d. 1704; 12th Earl of Erroll	George Livingston; 1616–1690; 3rd Earl of Linlithgow	Alexander Livingston d. 1685; 2nd Earl of Callendar, etc.	William Boyd; 1646–1692; 1st Earl of Kilmarnock, 10th Lord Boyd
George Livingston d. 1695; 4th Earl of Linlithgow	Alexander Livingston d. 1692; 3rd Earl of Callendar, etc.	William Boyd; 1663/1664 – 1692; 2nd Earl of Kilmarnock
Charles Hay c. 1680 – 1717; 13th Earl of Erroll	Mary Hay d. 1758; 14th Countess of Erroll	Margaret Hay d. 1723	James Livingston d. 1723; 5th Earl of Linlithgow, 4th Earl of Callendar, etc.	William Boyd; 1683/1684 – 1717; 3rd Earl of Kilmarnock
Earldoms of Linlithgow and of Callendar attainted, 1716
James Livingston; 1710–1715 styled Lord Livingston	Anne Livingston; 1709–1747	William Boyd; 1705–1746; 4th Earl of Kilmarnock
Earldom of Kilmarnock forfeit, 1746
James Hay d. 1778; 15th Earl of Erroll	George III; 1738–1820; King of Great Britain / the United Kingdom
George Hay d. 1798; 16th Earl of Erroll	William Hay d. 1819; 17th Earl of Erroll	William IV; 1765–1837; King of the United Kingdom	Edward; 1767–1820; Duke of Kent and Strathearn
Baron Kilmarnock, 1831
William George Hay; 1801–1846; 18th Earl of Erroll, 1st Baron Kilmarnock	Elizabeth FitzClarence	Victoria; 1819–1901; Queen of the United Kingdom
William Harry Hay; 1823–1891; 19th Earl of Erroll, 2nd Baron Kilmarnock	Agnes Georgiana Elizabeth Hay; 1829–1869	Edward VII; 1841–1910; King of the United Kingdom
Charles Gordon Hay; 1852–1927; 20th Earl of Erroll, 3rd Baron Kilmarnock	Alexander William George Duff; 1849–1912; Duke of Fife	Louise Victoria Alexandra Dagmar; 1867–1931
Victor Alexander Sereld Hay; 1876–1928; 21st Earl of Erroll, 4th Baron Kilmarnock
Josslyn Victor Hay; 1901–1941; 22nd Earl of Erroll, 5th Baron Kilmarnock m. Idina Sackville; 1893–1955	Gilbert Allan Rowland Boyd (né Hay); 1903–1975; 6th Baron of Kilmarnock
Diana Denyse Hay; 1926–1978; 23rd Countess of Erroll	Alastair Ivor Gilbert Boyd; 1927–2009; 7th Baron of Kilmarnock
Merlin Sereld Victor Gilbert Hay b. 1948; 24th Earl of Erroll	Robin Jordan Boyd b. 1941; 8th Baron of Kilmarnock
Thomas William Hay b. 1984 styled Lord Hay	Simon John Boyd b. 1978
Heir to the earldom of Erroll	Heir to the barony of Kilmarnock

== See also ==
- Earl of Erroll
- Baron Kilmarnock
