= Earl of Erroll =

Title in the Peerage of Scotland

Earldom of Erroll
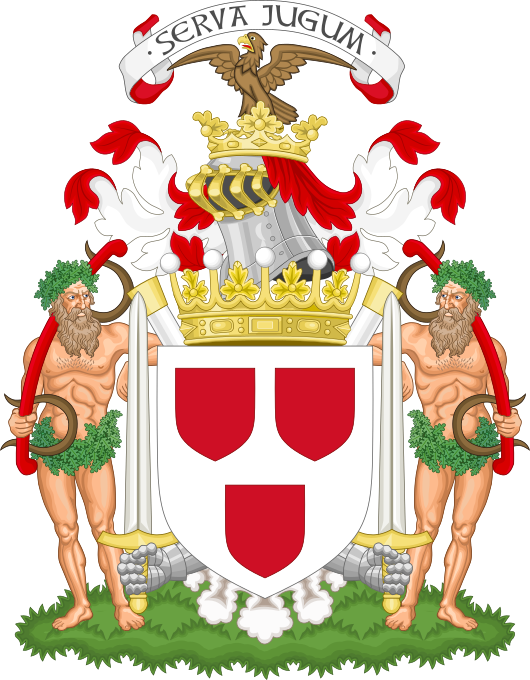
- Coat of arms of Hay, Earls of Erroll: Argent, three escutcheons gules
- Creation date: 1453
- Created by: James II of Scotland
- Peerage: Peerage of Scotland
- First holder: William Hay, 1st Earl of Erroll
- Present holder: Merlin Hay, 24th Earl of Erroll
- Heir apparent: Harry Thomas William Hay, Lord Hay
- Remainder to: heirs general of the body of the grantee
- Subsidiary titles: Lord Hay, Lord Slains
- Seat: Woodbury House
- Former seat: New Slains Castle

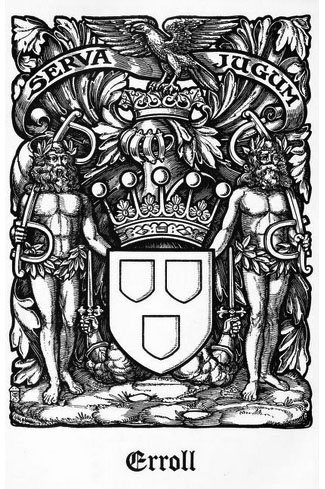
Coat of arms of Hay, Earls of Erroll, The Scots Peerage

Earl of Erroll (/ˈɛrəl/) is a title in the Peerage of Scotland. It was created in 1453 for Sir William Hay. The subsidiary titles held by the Earl of Erroll are Lord Hay (created 1449) and Lord Slains (1452), both in the Peerage of Scotland. The Earls of Erroll also hold the hereditary office of Lord High Constable of Scotland. The office was once associated with great power. The Earls of Erroll hold the hereditary title of Chief of Clan Hay.

The Earl of Erroll is one of four peers entitled to appoint a private pursuivant, with the title "Slains Pursuivant of Arms". Earl of Erroll is also the name of a Scottish highland dance, danced today at Highland games around the world.

The family seat is Woodbury House, near Everton, Bedfordshire.

== History ==
The Hay clan descends from Scoto-Norman knight Guillaume de la Haye, who first appears on the records circa 1160.

Gilbert de la Hay (died April 1333), ancestor of the Earls of Erroll, was the older brother of William de la Hay, ancestor of the Earls of Kinnoull. In 1251, William received a charter of two carucates of land from his brother, which was confirmed by King Alexander III.

== Regrant of the earldom of Erroll ==
A regrant was one of the peculiarities in the Scottish law of peerage, that a party might, by a resignation to the Crown, and a charter following upon such resignation, obtain power to nominate the heirs to succeed him in his honours and dignities. Some of the highest of the Scottish peerages are held under such nominations.

Gilbert Hay, 11th Earl of Erroll, on 13 November 1666, obtained a regrant of his honours. This regrant had special power to nominate his heirs. This nomination was made in 1674 with Gilbert appointing his cousin Sir John Hay of Keillour and his heir male, failing which, appointing Sir John Hay of Keillour's heir female, and failing which, appointing certain Hays of Tweeddale. The 11th Earl of Erroll having died in 1674 without issue, Sir John Hay of Keillour became 12th Earl of Erroll. On his death in 1704, his son, Charles became the 13th Earl of Erroll. Charles died unmarried in 1717, when the title devolved on his sister, Mary.

Mary Hay, 14th Countess of Erroll died in 1758 without issue. Mary's sister Margaret had previously died at Rome in 1723, however she had married James Livingston, 5th Earl of Linlithgow, 4th Earl of Callendar, and had issue, and it is from her that the present Earl of Erroll is descended.

This regrant was questioned in the House of Lords in 1797. The then Earl of Lauderdale had questioned George, the 16th Earl of Erroll's right to vote at an election of the peers of Scotland. One of the objections made to the title was that the title of Earl of Erroll was claimed through a nomination. It was decided in 1748 in the case of the earldom of Stair that this power of nomination could not be validly exercised after the Union. The House of Lords, after a full inquiry, decided in favour of the 16th Earl of Erroll's right to the title. That the Earl of Erroll holds the honours of his house undoubtedly and without dispute, is clear from the decision of the House of Lords.

Family tree of the Earls of: Callendar, Erroll, Kilmarnock, and Linlithgow

William I de Haya
Feudal Baron of Erroll, c. 1178
William II de Haya fl. 1160–1201; 1st Feudal Baron of Erroll
David de la Hay; 2nd Feudal Baron of Erroll	William III de la Hay	John de la Hay	Thomas de la Hay	Robert de la Hay	Malcolm de la Hay
Gilbert I de la Hay d. c. 1263; 3rd Feudal Baron of Erroll
Nicholas de la Haye fl. 13th century 4th Feudal Baron of Erroll
Gilbert II de la Hay d. 1333; 5th Feudal Baron of Erroll; Lord High Constable of Scotland	Hugh de la Haye fl. 13th–14th century
Nicholas de la Haye d. 1332
David de la Hay c. 1318 – 1346; 6th Feudal Baron of Erroll; Lord High Constable of Scotland	Robert II; 1316–1390; King of Scotland
Thomas de la Hay c. 1342 – 1406; 7th Feudal Baron of Erroll; Lord High Constable of Scotland	Elizabeth Stewart	Robert III c. 1337 – 1406; King of Scotland
Lord Hay, a. 1429/1430
William de la Haye d. 1436; 1st Lord Hay	Alice de la Haye m. William Hay of Lochorwart and Yester d. 1421
Gilbert of the Haye d. 1436	James I 1394–1437; King of Scotland	David Hay of Lochorwart and Yester d. a. 1478
Earl of Erroll, 1453	Lord Hay of Yester, 1487/1488
William Hay; 1423–1462; 1st Earl of Erroll	Annabella of Scotland c. 1436 – 1509
Nicholas Hay c. 1436 – 1470; 2nd Earl of Erroll	William Hay; 1449–1507; 3rd Earl of Erroll	Isabel Gordon
William Hay; 1470 – 1513; 4th Earl of Erroll	Thomas Hay d. 1513
William Hay d. 1522; 5th Earl of Erroll
William Hay d. 1541; 6th Earl of Erroll	George Hay c. 1508 – 1573; 7th Earl of Erroll
Jean Hay	Andrew Hay, 8th Earl of Erroll d. 1585; 8th Earl of Erroll
Earl of Linlithgow, 1600
Francis Hay; 1564–1631; 9th Earl of Erroll	George Hay	Helen Hay c. 1552 – 1627	Alexander Livingston c. 1552 – 1627; 1st Earl of Linlithgow
Lord Livingston of Almond, 1633; Earl of Callendar, 1641
William Hay a. 1597 – 1636; 10th Earl of Erroll	Sir Andrew Hay	Alexander Livingston d. 1648; 2nd Earl of Linlithgow	James Livingston c. 1590s – 1674; 1st Earl of Callendar, etc.
Earl of Kilmarnock, 1661
Gilbert Hay; 1631–1674; 11th Earl of Erroll	John Hay d. 1704; 12th Earl of Erroll	George Livingston; 1616–1690; 3rd Earl of Linlithgow	Alexander Livingston d. 1685; 2nd Earl of Callendar, etc.	William Boyd; 1646–1692; 1st Earl of Kilmarnock, 10th Lord Boyd
George Livingston d. 1695; 4th Earl of Linlithgow	Alexander Livingston d. 1692; 3rd Earl of Callendar, etc.	William Boyd; 1663/1664 – 1692; 2nd Earl of Kilmarnock
Charles Hay c. 1680 – 1717; 13th Earl of Erroll	Mary Hay d. 1758; 14th Countess of Erroll	Margaret Hay d. 1723	James Livingston d. 1723; 5th Earl of Linlithgow, 4th Earl of Callendar, etc.	William Boyd; 1683/1684 – 1717; 3rd Earl of Kilmarnock
Earldoms of Linlithgow and of Callendar attainted, 1716
James Livingston; 1710–1715 styled Lord Livingston	Anne Livingston; 1709–1747	William Boyd; 1705–1746; 4th Earl of Kilmarnock
Earldom of Kilmarnock forfeit, 1746
James Hay d. 1778; 15th Earl of Erroll	George III; 1738–1820; King of Great Britain / the United Kingdom
George Hay d. 1798; 16th Earl of Erroll	William Hay d. 1819; 17th Earl of Erroll	William IV; 1765–1837; King of the United Kingdom	Edward; 1767–1820; Duke of Kent and Strathearn
Baron Kilmarnock, 1831
William George Hay; 1801–1846; 18th Earl of Erroll, 1st Baron Kilmarnock	Elizabeth FitzClarence	Victoria; 1819–1901; Queen of the United Kingdom
William Harry Hay; 1823–1891; 19th Earl of Erroll, 2nd Baron Kilmarnock	Agnes Georgiana Elizabeth Hay; 1829–1869	Edward VII; 1841–1910; King of the United Kingdom
Charles Gordon Hay; 1852–1927; 20th Earl of Erroll, 3rd Baron Kilmarnock	Alexander William George Duff; 1849–1912; Duke of Fife	Louise Victoria Alexandra Dagmar; 1867–1931
Victor Alexander Sereld Hay; 1876–1928; 21st Earl of Erroll, 4th Baron Kilmarnock
Josslyn Victor Hay; 1901–1941; 22nd Earl of Erroll, 5th Baron Kilmarnock m. Idina Sackville; 1893–1955	Gilbert Allan Rowland Boyd (né Hay); 1903–1975; 6th Baron of Kilmarnock
Diana Denyse Hay; 1926–1978; 23rd Countess of Erroll	Alastair Ivor Gilbert Boyd; 1927–2009; 7th Baron of Kilmarnock
Merlin Sereld Victor Gilbert Hay b. 1948; 24th Earl of Erroll	Robin Jordan Boyd b. 1941; 8th Baron of Kilmarnock
Thomas William Hay b. 1984 styled Lord Hay	Simon John Boyd b. 1978
Heir to the earldom of Erroll	Heir to the barony of Kilmarnock

== Earls of Erroll (1453) ==
- William Hay, 1st Earl of Erroll (d. c. 1462)
- Nicholas Hay, 2nd Earl of Erroll (d. 1470)
- William Hay, 3rd Earl of Erroll (d. 1507)
- William Hay, 4th Earl of Erroll (d. 1513)
- William Hay, 5th Earl of Erroll (d. 1522) (Note: There is some confusion among the sources on the counting of the Earls. Some sources appear to conflate the William Hay who died in 1522 with his son, William Hay, who was born in 1521. Also, some sources do not include Countess Mary Hay in the count of Earls. This leaves some sources reporting James Hay as the 13th Earl, a difference in the count which is then passed down to his successors.)
- William Hay, 6th Earl of Erroll (c. 1521–1541)
- George Hay, 7th Earl of Erroll (d. 1573)
- Andrew Hay, 8th Earl of Erroll (d. 1585)
- Francis Hay, 9th Earl of Erroll (d. 1631)
- William Hay, 10th Earl of Erroll (d. 1636)
- Gilbert Hay, 11th Earl of Erroll (d. 1674)
- John Hay, 12th Earl of Erroll (d. 1704)
- Charles Hay, 13th Earl of Erroll (d. 1717)
- Mary Hay, 14th Countess of Erroll (d. 1758)
- James Hay, 15th Earl of Erroll (1726–1778)
- George Hay, 16th Earl of Erroll (1767–1798)
- William Hay, 17th Earl of Erroll (1772–1819)
- William George Hay, 18th Earl of Erroll (1801–1846)
- William Harry Hay, 19th Earl of Erroll (1823–1891)
- Charles Gore Hay, 20th Earl of Erroll (1852–1927)
- Victor Alexander Sereld Hay, 21st Earl of Erroll (1876–1928)
- Josslyn Victor Hay, 22nd Earl of Erroll (1901–1941)
- Diana Denyse Hay, 23rd Countess of Erroll (1926–1978)
- Merlin Sereld Victor Gilbert Hay, 24th Earl of Erroll (b. 1948)

The heir apparent is the present holder's son Harry Thomas William Hay, Lord Hay (b. 1984).

== See also ==
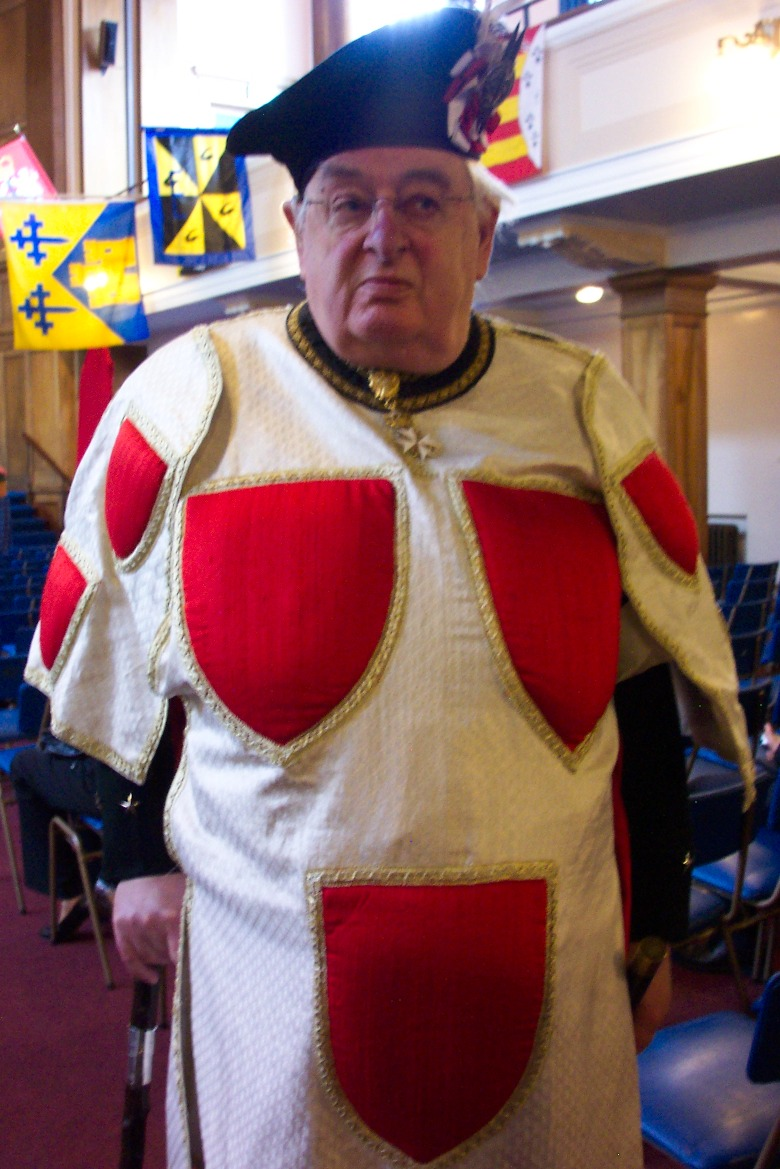
Slains Pursuivant Peter Drummond-Murray of Mastrick, the private officer of arms of the Earl of Erroll, who displays the arms of Hay on his tabard

- Clan Hay
- Baron Kilmarnock
- Earl of Kinnoull
