= George Hay, 16th Earl of Erroll =

Scottish peer and soldier

Colonel The Right Honourable The Earl of Erroll
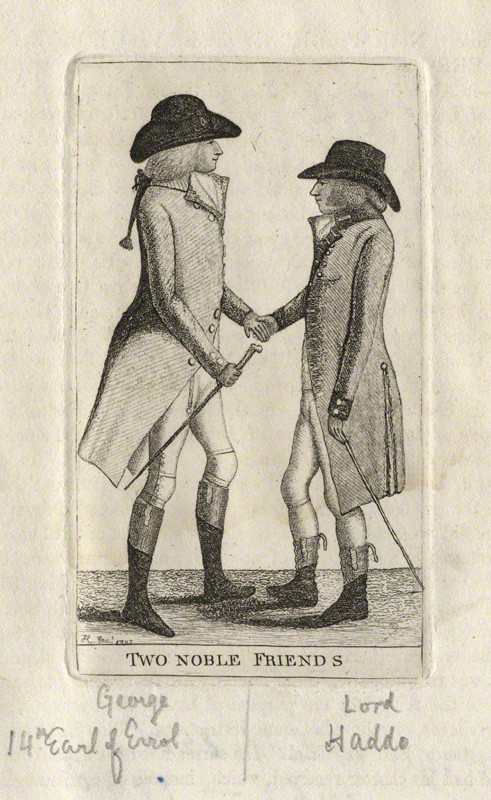
- George Hay, 16th Earl of Erroll, and George Gordon, Lord Haddo, by John Kay etching, 1787

Personal details
- Born: George Hay; 13 May 1767
- Died: 14 June 1798 (aged 31)
- Spouse: Elizabeth Jemima Blake (m. 1790)
- Relations: William Boyd, 4th Earl of Kilmarnock (grandfather); William Hay, 17th Earl of Erroll (brother)
- Parent(s): James Hay, 15th Earl of Erroll; Isabella Carr

Colonel George Hay, 16th Earl of Erroll (13 May 1767 – 14 June 1798), was a Scottish peer and soldier.

== Early life ==
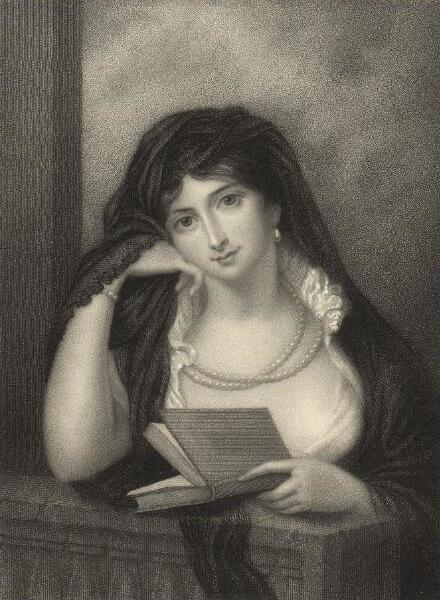
His wife Elizabeth, Countess of Erroll, by Thomas Anthony Dean, c. 1790

Erroll was the eldest son of James Hay, 15th Earl of Erroll, and his second wife, Isabella Carr, the eldest daughter and co-heiress of William Carr of Etal in Northumberland. His elder sister, Lady Augusta Hay (the first wife George Boyle, 4th Earl of Glasgow), succeeded to the Etal estate in 1806. From his father's first marriage to Rebecca Lockhart, he had one half-sibling, Lady Mary Hay, who married General John Scott of Balcomie. His younger brother was William Hay, later 17th Earl of Erroll, who served as Lord High Commissioner to the General Assembly of the Church of Scotland from 1817 to 1819.

Erroll's paternal grandparents were William Boyd, 4th Earl of Kilmarnock, and Lady Anne Livingston, a daughter of James Livingston, 5th Earl of Linlithgow.

== Career ==
In 1778, he succeeded to the earldom of Erroll following the death of his father. In 1780, he entered the British Army as Cornet, 7th Dragoons. He was made Captain of the 5th Dragoons in 1786 and of the 58th Regiment of Foot in 1792. In 1793, he became a Major of the 78th Regiment of Foot and a Colonel of the 1st Regiment of Foot in 1795.

From 1796 until his death in 1798, he was a Scottish representative peer.

=== Right to title ===
Where a Scottish peer has no son, his peerage can be inherited by or descend through female heirs. Upon the death of Mary Hay, 14th Countess of Erroll, who died in 1758 without issue, Erroll's father James Boyd, son of William Boyd, 4th Earl of Kilmarnock, a great-nephew of the Countess, became the 15th Earl of Erroll and took the name of Hay. He was a grandson of her sister Lady Margaret, who had died at Rome in 1723, having married James Livingston, 5th Earl of Linlithgow, 4th Earl of Callendar. The regrant of the peerage was questioned in the House of Lords in 1797. James Maitland, 8th Earl of Lauderdale, questioned the right of the 16th Earl of Erroll to vote at an election of the representative peers of Scotland. One of the objections he made was that the earldom of Erroll had been claimed through a nomination made by Gilbert Hay, 11th Earl of Erroll (died 1674), in favour of his kinsman Sir John Hay; at a time when in some circumstances Scottish peers could choose their successor; and it had been decided in 1748 in the case of the earldom of Stair that such a power of nomination could not be validly exercised after the Treaty of Union. The House of Lords, after a full inquiry, decided in favour of the 16th Earl of Erroll's right to the peerage. That he held the honours of the house of Erroll undoubtedly and without dispute, is clear from the decision of the House of Lords.

== Personal life ==
On 25 January 1790, Lord Erroll was married to Elizabeth Jemima Blake (d. 17 January 1831 in Malta), the sister of Joseph Blake, 1st Baron Wallscourt, and a daughter of Joseph Blake of Ardfry (County Galway, Ireland) and Honoria Daly (a daughter of Dermot Daly). Her sister, Joanna Harriet Blake, was the mother of Sir Dominick Daly, the 15th Governor of Prince Edward Island and 7th Governor of South Australia.

Lord Erroll died on 14 June 1798 and was succeeded by his younger brother, William. His widow, the dowager Countess of Erroll, remarried to the Rt.-Hon. John Hookham Frere (a son of John Frere) on 12 September 1816, and died in 1831.

== Ancestors ==
Ancestors of George Hay, 16th Earl of Erroll

William Boyd, 3rd Earl of Kilmarnock (1692–1717)
William Boyd, 4th Earl of Kilmarnock (1705–1746)
Eupheme Ross
James Hay, 15th Earl of Erroll (1726–1778)
James Livingston, 5th Earl of Linlithgow (1692–1723)
Lady Anne Livingston (1707–1747)
Lady Margaret Hay (1692–1707)
George Hay, 16th Earl of Erroll (1772–1819)
Sir William Carr (1705–1777)
Isabella Carr (1747–1808)

Peerage of Scotland
Preceded by James Hay	Earl of Erroll; 1778–1798	Succeeded by William Hay
