= James Hay, 15th Earl of Erroll =

Scottish nobleman (1726–1778)

The Right Honourable The Earl of Erroll
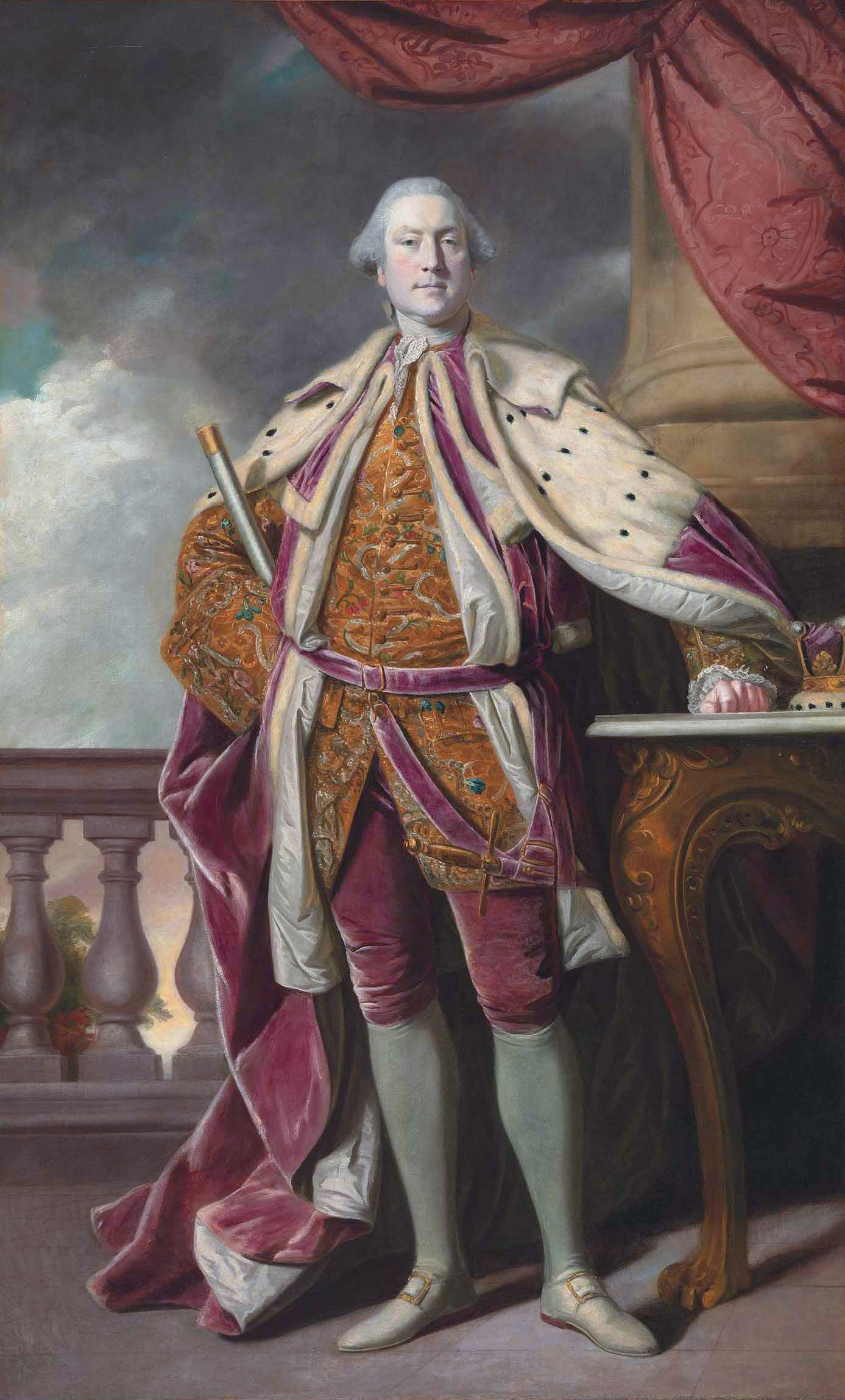
- Portrait of Lord Erroll in coronation robes, holding the baton of Lord High Constable of Scotland, by Joshua Reynolds

Rector of the University of Glasgow
- In office 1761–1763
- Preceded by: James Milliken of Milliken
- Succeeded by: Thomas Miller

Personal details
- Born: James Boyd; 20 April 1726 Falkirk, Stirlingshire, Scotland
- Died: 3 July 1778 (aged 52) Callendar House
- Party: Tory
- Spouses: Rebecca Lockhart (m. 1749; died 1761) Isabella Carr (m. 1762)
- Children: 13, including George and William
- Parent(s): William Boyd, 4th Earl of Kilmarnock; Anne Livingston of Erroll

James Hay, 15th Earl of Erroll (20 April 1726 – 3 June 1778 (Chester Courant, 16 June 1778)) styled Lord Boyd from 1728 to 1746, was a Scottish nobleman and the son of William Boyd, 4th Earl of Kilmarnock. (Note: There is some confusion among the sources on the counting of the Earls. Some sources appear to conflate the William Hay who died in 1522 with his son, William Hay, who was born in 1521. Also, some sources do not include Countess Mary Hay in the count of Earls. This leaves some sources reporting James Hay as the 13th Earl, a difference in the count which is then passed down to his successors.) After his father was attainted in 1746, he became Mr James Boyd, but in 1758 he inherited the Earldom of Erroll from his great-aunt Mary Hay, 14th Countess of Erroll.

== Early life ==
He was born James Boyd at Falkirk on 20 April 1726, the eldest son of William Boyd, 4th Earl of Kilmarnock, and his wife Lady Anne Livingston. She was the only daughter of James Livingston, 5th Earl of Linlithgow, a Jacobite attainted for his role in the 1715 Rising, and Lady Margaret Hay, the second daughter of John Hay, 12th Earl of Erroll.

From 1728 to 1746, Erroll was known by the courtesy title of Lord Boyd, while his father was Earl of Kilmarnock.

== Career ==
During the 1745 Jacobite Rebellion his father sided with the Young Pretender, despite both of his sons, James and William Boyd, then holding commissions under King George II; James Boyd in the British army, his brother in the Royal Navy. Remaining loyal to the Hanoverians, James Boyd fought at the Battle of Culloden on the opposite side to his father. During the rout following the Jacobite defeat, the Earl of Kilmarnock was captured and taken prisoner, dishevelled and bareheaded, and was reportedly recognised by his son James, who placed his own hat on his father's head. This was the last time they were to meet, as Kilmarnock was then transported to London, tried for treason, and executed four months later; forfeiting all his lands and titles, which deprived his son of his inheritance.

In 1751, however, although the Earldom remained forfeit, James Boyd was allowed to inherit the Kilmarnock estates. These included Dean Castle, the former family seat which had been gutted by a fire in 1735. Trying to cover some of his father's debts, which he had also inherited, James Boyd sold the ruined castle to the 13th Earl of Glencairn. From 1751 to 1752, he served as Grand Master of the Grand Lodge of Scotland.

=== Later life ===
On 19 August 1758, James Boyd succeeded his maternal great-aunt, Mary Hay, 14th Countess of Erroll, as Earl of Erroll, simultaneously changing his surname from Boyd to Hay, as he and his descendants were henceforth to be known. Along with the title Earl of Erroll, he also held the ceremonial hereditary office of Lord High Constable of Scotland.

Between 1770 and 1774, he served as a Tory Scottish representative peer in the House of Lords, and from 1770 to 1778, he was Lord of Police for Scotland.

In 1774 the town of Errol in New Hampshire was named in honour of him by a local governor.

== Personal life ==
On 15 September 1749, he married Rebecca Lockhart, the daughter of Alexander Lockhart, Lord Covington. Before her death in 1761, they were the parents of one daughter:

- Lady Mary Hay (b. 1754), who married Gen. John Scott of Balcomie in 1770, divorced in 1771.

In 1762, he married Isabella Carr (1747–1808), daughter of Sir William Carr of Etal, Northumberland. Together, they were the parents of twelve children, including:

- Lady Charlotte Hay (1763–1800), who married Rev. William Holwell, Vicar of Menheniot, in 1797.
- Lady Isabella Anne Hay (1765–1793)
- Lady Augusta Hay (1766–1822), who married George Boyle, 4th Earl of Glasgow.
- George Hay, 16th Earl of Erroll (1767–1798), who married Elizabeth Jemima Blake, the sister of Joseph Blake, 1st Baron Wallscourt.
- Lady Harriet Jane Hay (1768–1812)
- Lady Margaret Hay (1769–1832), who married Charles Cameron in 1789.
- Lady Maria Elizabeth Hay (1771–1804), who married Rev. George Moore, Rector of Wrotham, eldest son of Most. Rev. John Moore, Archbishop of Canterbury, in 1795.
- William Hay, 17th Earl of Erroll (1772–1819), who married three times and had eleven children.
- Lady Frances Hay (1773–1806)
- Lady Flaminia Hay (1774–1821), who married Capt. George James in 1809.
- Lady Jemima Hay (1776–1822)
- Hon. James Hay (d. 1797)

Lord Erroll died on 3 June 1778 at Callendar House, aged fifty-two, and was succeeded by his eldest son, George. His widow died 3 November 1808.

=== Descendants ===
Lord Erroll's grandson, William Hay, 18th Earl of Erroll, was created Baron Kilmarnock in the peerage of the United Kingdom in 1831.

== Ancestry ==
Ancestors of James Hay, 15th Earl of Erroll

16. William Boyd, 1st Earl of Kilmarnock (1646-1692)
8. William Boyd, 2nd Earl of Kilmarnock (1663/4-1692)
17. Lady Jean Cuninghame
4. William Boyd, 3rd Earl of Kilmarnock (1683/4-1717)
18. Thomas Boyd (-1696)
9. Letitia Boyd
19. Mary Loftus
2. William Boyd, 4th Earl of Kilmarnock (1704-1746)
20. George Ross, 11th Lord Ross (-1682)
10. William Ross, 12th Lord Ross (c1656-1738)
21. Lady Grizel Cochrane (-1665)
5. Lady Eupheme Ross (1684-)
22. Sir John Wilkie, of Foulden
11. Agnes Wilkie
23. Hon. Rachel Carmichael
1. James Hay, 15th Earl of Erroll
24. George Livingston, 3rd Earl of Linlithgow (1616-1690)
12. Alexander Livingston, 3rd Earl of Callendar (-1692)
25. Lady Elizabeth Maule
6. James Livingston, 5th Earl of Linlithgow, 4th Earl of Callendar (-1723)
26. James Graham, 2nd Marquess of Montrose (c1631-1669)
13. Lady Anne Graham
27. Lady Isabel Douglas
3. Anne Livingston (1709-1747)
28. Sir Andrew Hay
14. John Hay, 12th Earl of Erroll (-1704)
29. Margaret Kinnaird
7. Lady Margaret Hay
30. James Drummond, 3rd Earl of Perth (1615-1675)
15. Lady Anne Drummond (1656-)
31. Lady Anne Gordon

Masonic offices
Preceded by The Earl of Eglinton	Grand Master of the Grand Lodge of Scotland; 1751–1752	Succeeded by George Drummond
Academic offices
Preceded by James Milliken of Milliken	Rector of the University of Glasgow; 1761–1763	Succeeded by Thomas Miller
Peerage of Scotland
Preceded by Mary Hay	Earl of Erroll; 1758–1778	Succeeded by George Hay
