= Gilbert de la Hay =

Gilbert de la Hay may refer to:

- Gilbert I de la Hay (died 1263), co-Regent of Scotland during King Alexander III of Scotland's minority
- Gilbert II de la Hay (died 1333), Lord High Constable of Scotland
