= William Hay, 17th Earl of Erroll =

Scottish peer (1772–1819)

The Right Honourable The Earl of Erroll

Lord High Commissioner
- In office 1817–1819
- Preceded by: The Lord Napier
- Succeeded by: The Earl of Morton

Personal details
- Born: William Hay; 12 March 1772
- Died: 26 January 1819 (aged 46)
- Spouses: Jane Bell (m. 1792; died 1793) Alicia Eliot (m. 1796; died 1812) Harriet Somerville (m. 1816)
- Children: 11, including James and William
- Parent(s): James Hay, 15th Earl of Erroll; Isabella Carr
- Relatives: William Boyd, 4th Earl of Kilmarnock (grandfather)

William Hay, 17th Earl of Erroll (12 March 1772 – 26 January 1819), known as Lord Hay until 1778, was a Scottish peer.

== Early life ==
Erroll was the son of James Hay, 15th Earl of Erroll and his second wife, Isabella Carr, the eldest daughter and co-heiress of William Carr of Etal in Northumberland. His elder sister, Lady Augusta Hay (the first wife George Boyle, 4th Earl of Glasgow), succeeded to the Etal estate in 1806. From his father's first marriage to Rebecca Lockhart, he had one half-sibling, Lady Mary Hay, who married Gen. John Scott of Balcomie.

His paternal grandparents were William Boyd, 4th Earl of Kilmarnock and Lady Anne Livingston (a daughter of James Livingston, 5th Earl of Linlithgow).

== Career ==
In 1798, he succeeded to the earldom of Erroll following the death of his elder brother George, who died without issue.

In 1805, he was appointed Knight Marischal of Scotland, serving until 1809. He also served as a Scottish representative peer (Whig) from 1806 to 1807 and, again, from 1818 to 1819.

From 1817 to 1819, he was Lord High Commissioner to the General Assembly of the Church of Scotland.

== Personal life ==
He firstly married Jane Bell (d. 1793), the second daughter of Matthew Bell of Wolsingham, in 1792. Before her death in 1793, they had one child together:

- Lady Dulcibella Jane Hay (21 March 1793 – 10 January 1885), who married The Ven. Charles Nourse Wodehouse, Archdeacon of Norwich, second son of the Rev. Philip Wodehouse, Prebend of Norwich (brother of John Wodehouse, 1st Baron Wodehouse, and second son of Sir Armine Wodehouse, 5th Baronet) and Apollonia Nourse (daughter and co-heiress of John Nourse), in 1821.

Secondly, he married Alicia Eliot (d. 1812), the third daughter of Samuel Eliot, Esq. of Antigua, and Alice (née Byam) Eliot (a daughter of Col. William Byam of Antigua), in 1796. Alicia was the sister-in-law of Sir Thomas Stapleton, 6th Bt. (also the 16th Baron Le Despencer). Together, they were the parents of seven children, including:

- James Hay, Lord Hay (1797–1815), who was killed at the Battle of Quatre Bras.
- Lady Alicia Hay (12 December 1798 – 21 January 1799), who died young.
- Lady Isabella Hay (24 February 1800 – 28 July 1868), who married Lt.-Gen. William Wemyss, second son of Lt.-Gen. William Wemyss MP and Frances Erskine (a daughter of Sir William Erskine, 1st Baronet) in 1820.
- William Hay, 18th Earl of Erroll (1801–1846), who married Lady Elizabeth FitzClarence, an illegitimate daughter of King William IV by his mistress Dora Bland ("Mrs Jordan").
- Lady Harriet Jemima Hay (20 January 1802 – 8 February 1837), who married Daniel Gurney, the High Sheriff of Norfolk, in 1822.
- Lady Caroline Augusta Hay (11 May 1804 – 19 August 1877), who married John Morant of Brockenhurst in 1823.
- Hon. Samuel Hay (9 January 1807 – 25 November 1847), who married Louisa Pleydell-Bouverie, the only daughter of Vice-Admiral Hon. Duncombe Pleydell-Bouverie (second son of Jacob Pleydell-Bouverie, 2nd Earl of Radnor) and Louisa May (second daughter of Joseph May of Hale House), in 1832.
- Lady Emma Hay (29 January 1809 – 17 July 1841), who married Rear-Admiral James Erskine Wemyss, eldest son of Lt.-Gen. William Wemyss, in 1826.

In 1816, he married, thirdly, to Harriet Somerville (d. 1864), sister of Mark Somerville, 16th Lord Somerville and third daughter of Lt.-Col. Hon. Hugh Somerville (second son of James Somerville, 13th Lord Somerville), by his second wife, Mary Digby (eldest daughter of Hon. Wriothesley Digby, son of William Digby, 5th Baron Digby). They were the parents of three children, the last of which was born after his death:

- Rev. Hon. Somerville Hay (20 July 1817 – 25 September 1853), who married Lady Alicia Diana Erskine, third daughter of Henry Erskine, 12th Earl of Buchan, in 1843.
- Lady Fanny Hay (18 August 1818 – 28 August 1853), who married the Rev. Stephen Ralph Cartwright, Rector of Aynhoe, in 1848.
- Lady Margaret Hay (31 August 1819 – 31 October 1891), who married Frederick Astell Lushington, sixth son of Sir Henry Lushington, 2nd Baronet and Fanny Maria Lewis (sister and co-heiress of Matthew Gregory Lewis) in 1846.

Lord Erroll died on 26 January 1819 and was succeeded by his eldest surviving son, William. His widow, the Dowager Countess of Erroll, died in 1864.

== Ancestors ==
Ancestors of William Hay, 17th Earl of Erroll

William Boyd, 3rd Earl of Kilmarnock (1692–1717)
William Boyd, 4th Earl of Kilmarnock (1705–1746)
Eupheme Ross
James Hay, 15th Earl of Erroll (1726–1778)
James Livingston, 5th Earl of Linlithgow (1692–1723)
Lady Anne Livingston (1707–1747)
Lady Margaret Hay (1692–1707)
William Hay, 17th Earl of Erroll (1772–1819)
William Carr (c.1678–1715)
William Carr (1703–1777)
Mary Carr (died 1725)
Isabella Carr (1747–1808)
John Bacon (1655–1736)
Isabella Bacon (1771–1746)
Isabel Deacon

Political offices
Preceded by The Lord Napier	Lord High Commissioner; 1817–1819	Succeeded by The Earl of Morton
Peerage of Scotland
Preceded by George Hay	Earl of Erroll; 1798–1819	Succeeded by William Hay
