= Alexander Livingston, 3rd Earl of Callendar =

Scottish nobleman (died 1692)

The Right Honourable The Earl of Callendar

Personal details
- Died: December 1692
- Spouse: Lady Anne Graham
- Children: James Livingston, 5th Earl of Linlithgow; Lady Harriet Livingston; Lady Mary Livingston
- Parent(s): George Livingston, 3rd Earl of Linlithgow; Lady Elizabeth Lyon

Alexander Livingston, 3rd Earl of Callendar (died December 1692) was a Scottish nobleman.

== Early life ==
He was the second son of George Livingston, 3rd Earl of Linlithgow, PC and Lady Elizabeth Lyon. His elder brother was George Livingston, 4th Earl of Linlithgow, who married Hon. Henrietta Sutherland, daughter of Alexander Sutherland, 1st Lord Duffus, and his sister was Lady Henrietta Livingston, who married Robert Makgill, 2nd Viscount of Oxfuird.

== Career ==
Upon the death of his uncle, Alexander Livingston, 2nd Earl of Callendar, he inherited the titles Earl of Callendar. His uncle had similarly inherited the titles upon the death of his uncle, Army officer James Livingston, 1st Earl of Callendar, the third son of Alexander Livingston, 1st Earl of Linlithgow. The first Earl had been given power, on 22 July 1646, failing heirs male of his body, to nominate a successor to this title containing an ultimate remainder to heirs general.

== Personal life ==
Callendar was married to Lady Anne Graham, the eldest daughter of James Graham, 2nd Marquess of Montrose and Lady Isabel Ker (the widow of Robert Ker, 1st Earl of Roxburghe and fifth daughter of William Douglas, 7th Earl of Morton). Children:

- James Livingston, who became the 4th Earl of Callendar and the 5th Earl of Linlithgow. He married Lady Margaret Hay, the second daughter of John Hay, 12th Earl of Erroll and Lady Anne Drummond (only daughter of James Drummond, 3rd Earl of Perth). Lady Margaret was the younger sister of sister of Mary Hay, 14th Countess of Erroll.
- Lady Harriet Livingston (d. 1738), who died unmarried.
- Lady Mary Livingston (d. 1734), who married James Graham of Airth, Judge of the Court of Admiralty in Scotland.

Callendar died in December 1692 and was succeeded by his son, James, who was the 4th and final Earl of Callendar following his attainded of high treason in February 1715/6 at which point all his titles and lands were forfeited.

Peerage of Scotland
Preceded by Andrew Livingston	Earl of Callendar; 1685–1692	Succeeded by James Livingston
