= Baron Kilmarnock =

Scottish peerage title

Barony of Kilmarnock
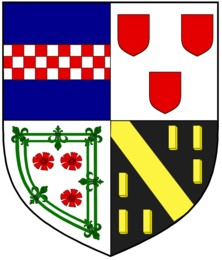
- Creation date: 1831
- Created by: King William IV
- Peerage: Peerage of the United Kingdom
- First holder: William Hay, 1st Baron Kilmarnock
- Present holder: Robin Boyd, 8th Baron Kilmarnock
- Heir apparent: Simon John Boyd
- Remainder to: heirs male of the body of the grantee

Baron Kilmarnock, of Kilmarnock in the County of Ayrshire, Scotland, is a title in the Peerage of the United Kingdom. It was created in 1831 for William Hay, 18th Earl of Erroll. This was a revival of the Kilmarnock title held by his great-grandfather William Boyd, 4th Earl of Kilmarnock, who was attainted in 1746 (with his titles forfeited).

== History ==
The barony of Kilmarnock remained a subsidiary title of the earldom of Erroll until the death in 1941 of the eighteenth Earl's great-great-grandson, the twenty-second Earl. The earldom, which could be passed on through female lines, was inherited by the late Earl's daughter and only child, the twenty-third Countess. The barony of Kilmarnock, which could only be passed on to male heirs, was inherited by the Earl's younger brother, the sixth Baron. He assumed the surname of Boyd in lieu of Hay the same year he succeeded to the title. As of 2013 the title is held by his younger son, the eighth Baron, who succeeded his elder brother in 2009.

The Barons Kilmarnock are the hereditary Clan Chiefs of Clan Boyd. The 7th Baron Kilmarnock, who held the active recognition as Chief, died on 19 March 2009. The 8th Baron Kilmarnock has not petitioned the Court of the Lord Lyon to be formally recognised as Clan Chief of Clan Boyd, though he remains the senior heir to both the barony and the chiefship.

== Barons Kilmarnock (1831) ==
- William George Hay, 18th Earl of Erroll, 1st Baron Kilmarnock (1801–1846)
- William Harry Hay, 19th Earl of Erroll, 2nd Baron Kilmarnock (1823–1891)
- Charles Gore Hay, 20th Earl of Erroll, 3rd Baron Kilmarnock (1852–1927)
- Victor Alexander Sereld Hay, 21st Earl of Erroll, 4th Baron Kilmarnock (1876–1928)
- Josslyn Victor Hay, 22nd Earl of Erroll, 5th Baron Kilmarnock (1901–1941)
- Gilbert Allan Rowland Boyd, 6th Baron Kilmarnock (1903–1975), brother of the 22nd Earl of Erroll
- Alastair Ivor Gilbert Boyd, 7th Baron Kilmarnock (1927–2009), son of the 6th Baron
- Robin Jordan Boyd, 8th Baron Kilmarnock (1941–), brother of the 7th Baron

The heir apparent is the holder's son Hon. Simon John Boyd (b. 1978).

== See also ==
- Clan Boyd
- Earl of Erroll
- Earl of Kilmarnock
