= William Hay, 6th Earl of Erroll =

Scottish peer

The Right Honourable The Earl of Erroll
- Arms of the Earl of Erroll

10th Lord High Constable of Scotland
- In office 1521–1541
- Preceded by: William Hay
- Succeeded by: George Hay

Personal details
- Born: 1521 Edinburgh, Scotland
- Died: 11 April 1541 (age 19 or 20) Edinburgh, Scotland
- Spouse: Lady Helen Stewart
- Children: Lady Jean Hay
- Parent(s): William Hay, 5th Earl of Erroll; Elizabeth Ruthven

William Hay, 6th Earl of Erroll (1521 – 11 April 1541), styled as Lord Hay until age 1, was a Scottish peer.

== Biography ==
William Hay was the son of the William Hay, 5th Earl of Erroll. He had double royal lineage, descended from Kings Robert II of Scotland and James I of Scotland.

He inherited the titles in 1522 at just a year old. As he died under the age of 21, the barony of Errol, Perthshire, were held by the crown all his life.

== Marriage and daughter ==
William Hay married Lady Helen (whose name also appears as "Elenor" and "Helenor") Stewart, eldest daughter of John Stewart, 3rd Earl of Lennox in 1539. James V and Mary of Guise attended the wedding, sailing to Dundee in a new ship called the Little Unicorn.

They had one daughter, Lady Jean Hay (1540), who married Andrew Hay, 8th Earl of Erroll.

== Death ==
The Earl of Erroll died on 11 April 1541, in Edinburgh, being under 21 years of age. The King gave black mourning clothes to his widow Helen Stewart. She later married John Gordon, 11th Earl of Sutherland. Six months after his death, the earldom and barony were restored to his cousin, George Hay, the grandson of William Hay, 3rd Earl of Erroll.

== Ancestry ==
Ancestors of William Hay, 6th Earl of Erroll

16. William Hay, 1st Earl of Erroll
8. William Hay, 3rd Earl of Erroll
17. Lady Beatrix Douglas
4. William Hay, 4th Earl of Erroll
18. George Gordon, 2nd Earl of Huntly
9. Lady Isabel Gordon
19. Annabella of Scotland (daughter of James I of Scotland)
2. William Hay, 5th Earl of Erroll
20. Patrick Lyon, 1st Lord Glamis
10. John Lyon, 3rd Lord Glamis
21. Isabel Ogilvy
5. Christian Lyon
22. Sir John Scrymgeour
11. Elizabeth Scrymgeour
23. Marion Abernathy
1. William Hay, 6th Earl of Erroll
24. Sir John of Ruthven
12. Sir Patrick Ruthven
6. William Ruthven, 1st Lord Ruthven
26. Sir Thomas Cranstoun of that Ilk
13. Unknown
3. Elizabeth Ruthven
14. William Forbes, 3rd Lord Forbes
7. Christian Forbes

Military offices
Preceded by William Hay	Lord High Constable of Scotland; 1522–1541	Succeeded by George Hay
Peerage of Scotland
Preceded by William Hay	Earl of Erroll; 1522–1541	Succeeded by George Hay
