= William Hay, 10th Earl of Erroll =

Scottish nobleman

The Right Honourable The Earl of Erroll PC
- Arms of the Earl of Erroll

14th Lord High Constable of Scotland
- In office 1631 – 7 December 1636
- Preceded by: Francis Hay
- Succeeded by: Gilbert Hay

Personal details
- Born: before 1597
- Died: 7 December 1636 Errol, Scotland
- Spouse: Anne Lyon (m. 1618)
- Children: Gilbert Hay, 11th Earl of Erroll; Margaret Kennedy, Countess of Cassilis
- Parent(s): Francis Hay, 9th Earl of Erroll; Lady Elizabeth Douglas

William Hay, 10th Earl of Erroll PC (before 1597 – 7 December 1636) was a Scottish nobleman.

== Biography ==
He was the eldest son of Francis Hay, 9th Earl of Erroll by his third wife, Lady Elizabeth, daughter of William Douglas, 6th Earl of Morton.

He was known as "Lord Hay". In January 1611, with the Earl of Pembroke and Lord Windsor, he escorted a French diplomat, the Marshal de Laverdin, from Croydon to Lambeth.

He succeeded to the earldom after his father's death in 1631. He became a member of the Privy Council on 28 May 1633. He also succeeded to the title of Lord High Constable of Scotland, and took part in the Scottish coronation of King Charles I of Holyrood Abbey on 18 June 1633.

The earl lived such an extravagant lifestyle that he was forced to sell off the family's namesake lands in Errol, which had been granted to his forebears by King William the Lion in the 12th century.

== Marriage and issue ==
In September 1618, he married Anne Lyon, daughter of Patrick Lyon, 1st Earl of Kinghorne and Anne Murray. They had issue:

1. Gilbert Hay (13 June 1631 – 1674)
2. Lady Margaret, married 1638 Lord Henry Ker (died 1643), son of Robert Ker, 1st Earl of Roxburghe; secondly in 1644; John Kennedy, 6th Earl of Cassilis

== Bibliography ==
- Paul, James Balfour (1906). The Scots Peerage : founded on Wood's edition of Sir Robert Douglas's Peerage of Scotland; containing an historical and genealogical account of the nobility of that kingdom. Vol. 3. Edinburgh: David Douglas.

Military offices
Preceded by Francis Hay	Lord High Constable of Scotland; 1631–1636	Succeeded by Gilbert Hay
Peerage of Scotland
Preceded by Francis Hay	Earl of Erroll; 1631–1636	Succeeded by Gilbert Hay
