= William II de Haya =

XII century Norman knight

William II de Haya (William II de la Haye, Guillaume de La Haye), was a Norman knight who is considered to be the progenitor of the Scottish Clan Hay. He is the first recorded de Haya in Scotland and is known to have been in the Scottish court in 1160.

== Early life ==
He was the son of William I de Haya and Juliana de Soulis, based on his reference to Ranulf de Soulis as his late uncle, i.e., his mother’s brother, in a charter, and was almost certainly born in the La Haye-Hue (now La Haye-Bellefond) / Soulles region of the Cotentin Peninsula, but the date is unknown. William II probably joined his uncle, Ranulf I de Soules, at the Scottish court as a young man. He married Eva of Pitmilly, Again, the date is unknown. Eva brought into the marriage lands at Pitmilly.

== Service to the King ==
William was pincerna (cup bearer or butler) to Malcolm IV and William the Lion, succeeding his uncle, Ranulf I de Soules, although the exact dates that he held this position are unknown. He witnessed some of the later charters of Malcolm IV, in one of which he is styled pincerna, and he is also styled as such in some of the early charters of William the Lion, and in a charter that he himself granted in 1171.

During the years 1173-74, three of Henry II of England's sons and his wife, Eleanor of Aquitaine, rebelled against him. In 1174, believing Henry II to be distracted by the fighting in France, William the Lion attempted to regain Northumberland for Scotland. He was captured at the Second Battle of Alnwick and taken to Henry in Falaise in Normandy. In order to regain his freedom, in December 1174, he had to sign the punitive Treaty of Falaise. One of the last provisions was that William the Lion had to send twenty-one hostages to England to ensure compliance. One who went in that role was William de Haya, his butler. In August 1175, the Treaty of Falaise was ratified at York and William the Lion and his brother, David, having paid homage to Henry II of England for Scotland and Galloway, were allowed to return to Scotland. According to J. C. D. Hay, William de Haya was also allowed to return to Scotland at that time.

William was one of the ambassadors sent in 1199 by William the Lion to the newly crowned King John of England to try to have his lost patrimony of Northumberland and Cumberland returned to Scotland. King William offered to swear fealty to King John if this demand was granted.

== The first feudal Baron of Erroll ==
Around 1178-8, William the Lion granted Erroll (Herol), located on the north side of the Tay estuary, to William II de Haya for the service of two knights. The barony, which was granted as a hereditary right (in feu and heritage), awarded the privileges associated with that rank, including the right to hold a judicial court and to retain the fines imposed (sake and soke), the right to exact tolls and to hold a market (toll and team), and the right to hang thieves caught red-handed (infangthief). This is the beginning of the still extant House of Erroll. The charter remains preserved in their family papers, while the artificial mound (motte) on which William II de Haya built his wooden tower in the twelfth century still existed at Erroll in 1967.

== Granting of lands ==
Granting of lands

In 1171 or 1172, William granted a charter to the Prior of St Andrews in which he and his wife, Eva, leased lands (eight carucates) in Pitmilly to the Priory of St Andrews for 20 years at an annual rent of half a mark of silver for the purposes of a hospital, meaning essentially a boarding house, for pilgrims traveling to St Andrews.

Sometime before 1187, William II de Haya granted the lands of Ederpolls to Coupar Angus Abbey for the benefit of the souls of King Malcolm; his uncle Ranulf de Soulis, and others, which grant was confirmed by King William, ostensibly between 1187 and 1195, although these dates are thought by Barrow to be too late. An abstract of William II de Haya's charter exists in Coupar Angus documents

== Legacy ==
William II and Eva had six sons, David, William III, John, Thomas, Robert and Malcolm. William II was still alive in 1201, as proved by a charter in the Benholm Charter-chest of that date, but apparently died soon afterwards. David succeeded his father as Baron of Erroll and married Ethna, the daughter of Gilbert, Earl of Strathearn, one of the three most powerful of the original seven Mormaers, or Celtic Earls of Scotland. This union with Celtic nobility strengthened the Hays' claim as a Celtic-Norman Scoto-Norman family.

== An alternative concept ==
The above biography of William II de Haya appears to be correct and is based on The Scots Peerage. However, the concept of two Williams de Haya in 12th-century Scotland appears in some sources, the first William dying around 1170, and his son, William, being the one who was granted the barony of Erroll. Burke's Peerage of 1930 clouds the issue by raising the possibility of there being two Williams, while the 1970 edition makes no reference to a second William. The “Hay cartwheel” shows two Williams. In this unusual document, the first of these Williams, the pincerna, is shown as having three sons, William, Robert and Peter, while, of these, William, is shown as being the father of the six sons mentioned above, i.e., David, yet another William, John, Thomas, Robert and Malcolm. The Scots Peerage concludes that the two 12th-century Williams in Scotland were probably the same person.
