= William Hay, 1st Earl of Erroll =

Scottish peer (1423–1462)

The Right Honourable The Earl of Erroll
- Arms of the Earl of Erroll

5th Lord High Constable of Scotland
- In office 1437–1462
- Preceded by: William de la Haye
- Succeeded by: Nicholas Hay

Personal details
- Born: 1423 Errol, Perthshire, Scotland
- Died: October 1462 (age 38 or 39) Old Slains Castle, Aberdeenshire
- Spouse: Beatrix Douglas (m. 1449)
- Children: 7, including Nicholas and William

William Hay, 1st Earl of Erroll (1423 – October 1462) was a Scottish peer. He was the first Earl of Erroll and the second Lord Hay of Erroll.

== Biography ==
William Hay was born in Erroll (now spelled Errol) in Perthshire, the son of Gilbert Hay and Alicia Hay, daughter of William Hay of Yester.

His paternal grandmother, Princess Elizabeth Stewart, was the youngest child of Robert II of Scotland and his first wife, Elizabeth Mure.

His paternal grandfather Thomas de la Hay was the third Lord High Constable of Scotland. William Hay inherited the title in 1437 after the death of his father Sir William.

In 1454, he purchased lands in Angus from Alexander Ogilvie of Auchterhouse.

On 17 March 1452, King James II of Scotland made him the first Earl of Erroll. Some historians list his death as August 1460, but Sir James Balfour Paul notes in The Scots Peerage that Kinnoull was alive in the Slains land inventory of November 1461. Balfour writes that the earl likely died in October 1462, and was interred in the Abbey Church of Cupar.

== Marriage and issue ==
He married Beatrix, a daughter of James Douglas, 7th Earl of Douglas, and had three sons and four daughters:

1. Nicholas Hay, 2nd Earl of Erroll (c. 1436–1470)
2. Lady Isabel Hay (1441–1509), married Laurence Oliphant, 1st Lord Oliphant
3. Lady Elizabeth Hay (c. 1442, married George Gordon, 2nd Earl of Huntly in 1471
4. Lady Beatrix Hay (1449–1517), married Sir Alexander Gordon
5. William Hay, 3rd Earl of Erroll (1449–1507)
6. Gilbert Hay (b. 1450)
7. Lady Margaret Hay (1453–1500), married three times: Alexander Fraser of Philorth; Sir Gilbert Keith of Inverugie; Robert Douglas of Lochleven

Military offices
Preceded by William de la Haye	Lord High Constable of Scotland; 1437–1462	Succeeded by Nicholas Hay
Peerage of Scotland
New creation	Earl of Erroll; 1452–1462	Succeeded by Nicholas Hay
