= Nicholas Hay, 2nd Earl of Erroll =

Scottish Earl

The Right Honourable The Earl of Erroll
- Arms of the Earl of Erroll

6th Lord High Constable of Scotland
- In office 1462–1470
- Preceded by: William Hay
- Succeeded by: William Hay

Personal details
- Born: c. 1446
- Died: 1470 (age 33 or 34)
- Spouse: Elizabeth Gordon (m. 1461)
- Parent(s): William Hay, 1st Earl of Erroll; Beatrix Douglas

Nicholas Hay, 2nd Earl of Erroll (c. 1436 – 1470) was a Scottish peer. He was the second Earl of Erroll and the third Lord Hay of Erroll.

== Biography ==
Nicholas Hay was the son of William Hay, 1st Earl of Erroll and Lady Beatrix Douglas, daughter of James Douglas, 7th Earl of Douglas. Nicholas was the great-great-grandson of King Robert II of Scotland and his first wife, Elizabeth Mure.

He had a contract to Lady Margaret, daughter of Alexander Gordon, 1st Earl of Huntly which for some reason did not take place; he instead married her sister, Lady Elizabeth, on 15 November 1461.

She secondly married John Kennedy, 2nd Lord Kennedy; she had a charter for life and on her death in 1500, left the lands of Cassillis and Dunure to the Kennedys.

The family seat was Slains Castle. He died without issue and the earldom passed to his brother, William.

Military offices
Preceded by William Hay	Lord High Constable of Scotland; 1462–1470	Succeeded by William Hay
Peerage of Scotland
Preceded by William Hay	Earl of Erroll; 1462–1470	Succeeded by William Hay
