= James Livingston, 5th Earl of Linlithgow =

Scottish nobleman and politician (died 1723)

Engraving of a portrait of Linlithgow at Woodstock House

James Livingston, 5th Earl of Linlithgow (died 25 April 1723) was a Scottish peer who was convicted of high treason and forced to forfeit his estates and all his titles to the Crown.

== Early life ==
Livingston was the only son and heir of Alexander Livingston, 3rd Earl of Callendar and his wife, Lady Anne Graham. He had two younger sisters, including Lady Mary Livingston, who married James Graham of Airth, Judge of the Court of Admiralty in Scotland.

His mother was the eldest daughter of James Graham, 2nd Marquess of Montrose and Lady Isabella Douglas (fifth daughter of William Douglas, 7th Earl of Morton). His father was the second son of George Livingston, 3rd Earl of Linlithgow and Lady Elizabeth Lyon (daughter of Patrick Maule, 1st Earl of Panmure and widow of John Lyon, 2nd Earl of Kinghorne). His paternal aunt, Lady Henrietta Livingston, was married to Robert Makgill, 2nd Viscount of Oxfuird.

== Career ==
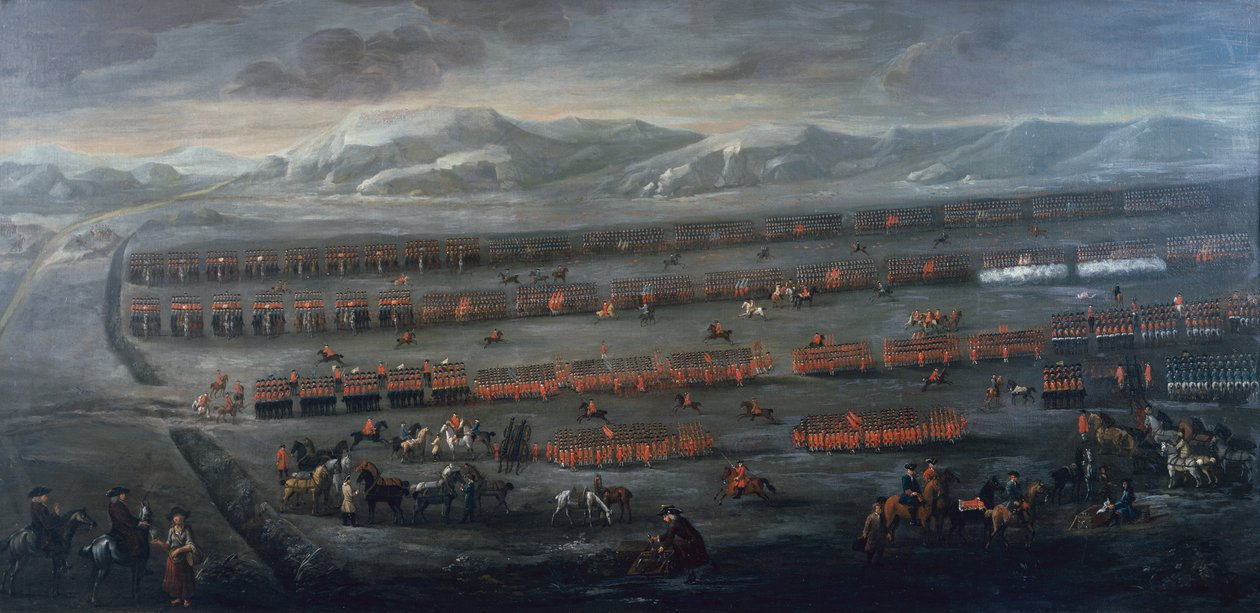
The Battle of Sheriffmuir, at which Linlithgow commanded a Jacobite cavalry squadron

In December 1692, he succeeded his father as 4th Earl of Callendar, Lord Livingston and Almond (who had inherited the title from James' great-uncle, Alexander Livingston), and on 7 August 1695, following the death of his paternal uncle George, he succeeded as the 5th Earl of Linlithgow. His uncle, who died without issue, had been married to Hon. Henrietta Sutherland (daughter of Alexander Sutherland, 1st Lord Duffus).

In 1712, he was Captain of the Company of Foot in Blackness Castle and from 13 January 1713 to 8 October 1713, he was a Scottish representative peer.

A fervent Jacobite, he joined the 1715 rising and commanded a Squadron of Horse in the Jacobite defeat during the Battle of Sheriffmuir in November 1715. Despite his surrender to John Campbell, 2nd Duke of Argyll, he was attained of high treason on 17 February 1715. Following his conviction, his estates and all his titles were forfeited to the Crown and sold. Linlithgow Palace was given to James Hamilton, 5th Duke of Hamilton, and in 1745 was occupied by "Colonel James Gardiner with his dragoons."

Livingston escaped to the Continent 1716 and joined the titular James III in exile in Papal territory at Urbino.

== Personal life ==
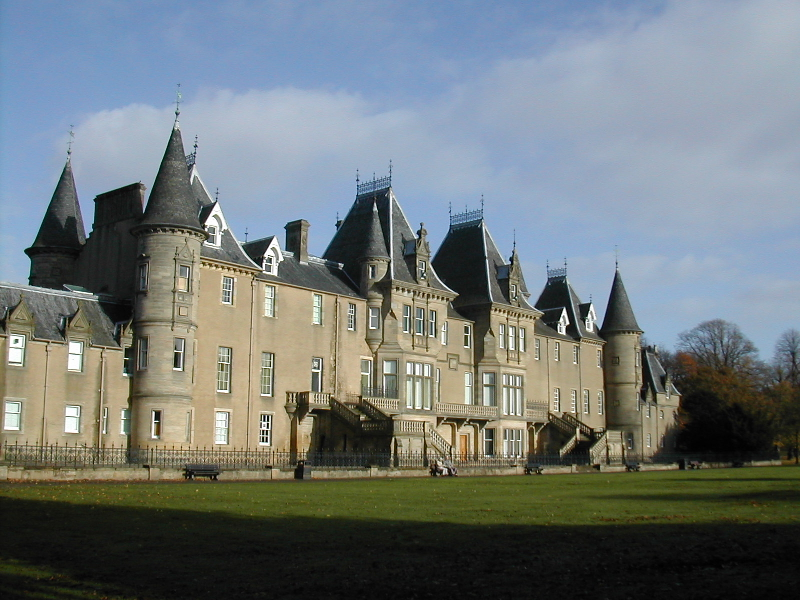
Lord Linlithgow's home Callendar House

At some point after May 1707, Linlithgow was married to Lady Margaret Hay (d. 1723), the second daughter of John Hay, 12th Earl of Erroll and Lady Anne Drummond (only daughter of James Drummond, 3rd Earl of Perth). Lady Margaret was the younger sister of sister of Mary Hay, 14th Countess of Erroll. Together, they were the parents of two children:

- Hon. James Livingston, Lord Livingston (1710–1715), who died in childhood.
- Lady Anne Livingston (1709–1747), who married William Boyd, 4th Earl of Kilmarnock (1705–1746), who was also convicted of high treason after which the Earldom of Kilmarnock was forfeited and he was executed on Tower Hill.

Linlithgow died on 25 April 1723 at Rome, Italy. As Lady Margaret's sister died childless, the Hay family dignities went to their grandson, James, Lord Boyd, son of the 4th Earl of Kilmarnock.

Peerage of Scotland
Preceded by George Livingston	Earl of Linlithgow; 1695–1715	Forfeit
Preceded by Alexander Livingston	Earl of Callendar; 1692–1715	Forfeit
