= Heirs of the body =

Principle of English law of inheritance

In English and American law, heirs of the body are the biological lineal descendants of the original holder, recipient, or grantee of a parcel or peerage, "the body" referring to that person's physical body from which his or her descendants issue. The phrase is used in letters patent and other legal instruments to stipulate that certain types of property pass to a direct blood descendant of the original holder according to a fixed order of kinship. Upon the death of the grantee, a designated inheritance such as a parcel of land, a peerage, or a monarchy, passes automatically to that living, natural descendant of the grantee who is most senior in descent according to primogeniture, males being preferred, however, over their sisters regardless of relative age; and thereafter the property continues to pass to subsequent descendants of the grantee, according to the same formula, upon the death of each subsequent heir. Legitimacy is also required of heirs in all extant letters patent, but that status is addressed by the separate phrase "lawfully begotten".

Baronies created by writ of summons to Parliament usually descend to heirs of the body of the grantee, and may thus be inherited by females. By the terms of the Act of Settlement 1701 and the Acts of Union 1707, the Crown of the United Kingdom of Great Britain and Northern Ireland descends to heirs of the body of the Electress Sophia of Hanover who are not Catholics or married to Catholics, subject to subsequent modification by Parliament (e.g. His Majesty's Declaration of Abdication Act 1936 and the Succession to the Crown Act 2013).

In property law, a conveyance by the owner O "To A and heirs of the body", without more, creates a fee tail for the grantee (A) with a reversion in the grantor (O) should the natural, lawful descendants of the grantee all die out. Each person who inherits according to this formula is considered an heir at law of the grantee. Since the inheritance may not pass to someone who is not a natural, lawful descendant of the grantee, the heir is necessarily also "of the body" of the grantee. When there are no more heirs of the body, the terms of the original grant are expired, and the property becomes extinct (as with a peerage), or some other criterion for allocating the property to a new possessor must be applied. If the original grant stipulated an alternative formula for succession upon exhaustion of heirs, that formula is immediately applicable.

Thus, excepting the existence of such an alternative formula, property settled upon someone and the heirs of his body—whether male, female, or general—will pass to his biological children, grandchildren, and so on, but not to his step- or adopted children, grandchildren, and so on; nor to his spouse, parents, siblings, or collateral relatives, such as nephews, uncles, or cousins.

There are other kinds of formulae for inheritance than heirs of the body, such as heirs male, heirs of the line, heirs portioners, heirs general, etc.
