= George Livingston, 3rd Earl of Linlithgow =

Scottish peer and military officer (1616–1690)

The Right Honourable The Earl of Linlithgow PC

Personal details
- Born: George Livingston; July 1616
- Died: 1 February 1690 (aged 73)
- Spouses: Lady Elizabeth Lyon (m. 1650, died) Agnes Wauchope Scott (m. 1677)
- Children: George Livingston, 4th Earl of Linlithgow; Alexander Livingston, 3rd Earl of Callendar; Lady Henrietta Livingston
- Parent(s): Alexander Livingston, 2nd Earl of Linlithgow; Lady Elizabeth Gordon
- Relatives: James Livingston, 5th Earl of Linlithgow (grandson)

George Livingston, 3rd Earl of Linlithgow, PC (July 1616 – 1 February 1690) was a military officer and third Earl of Linlithgow.

== Early life ==
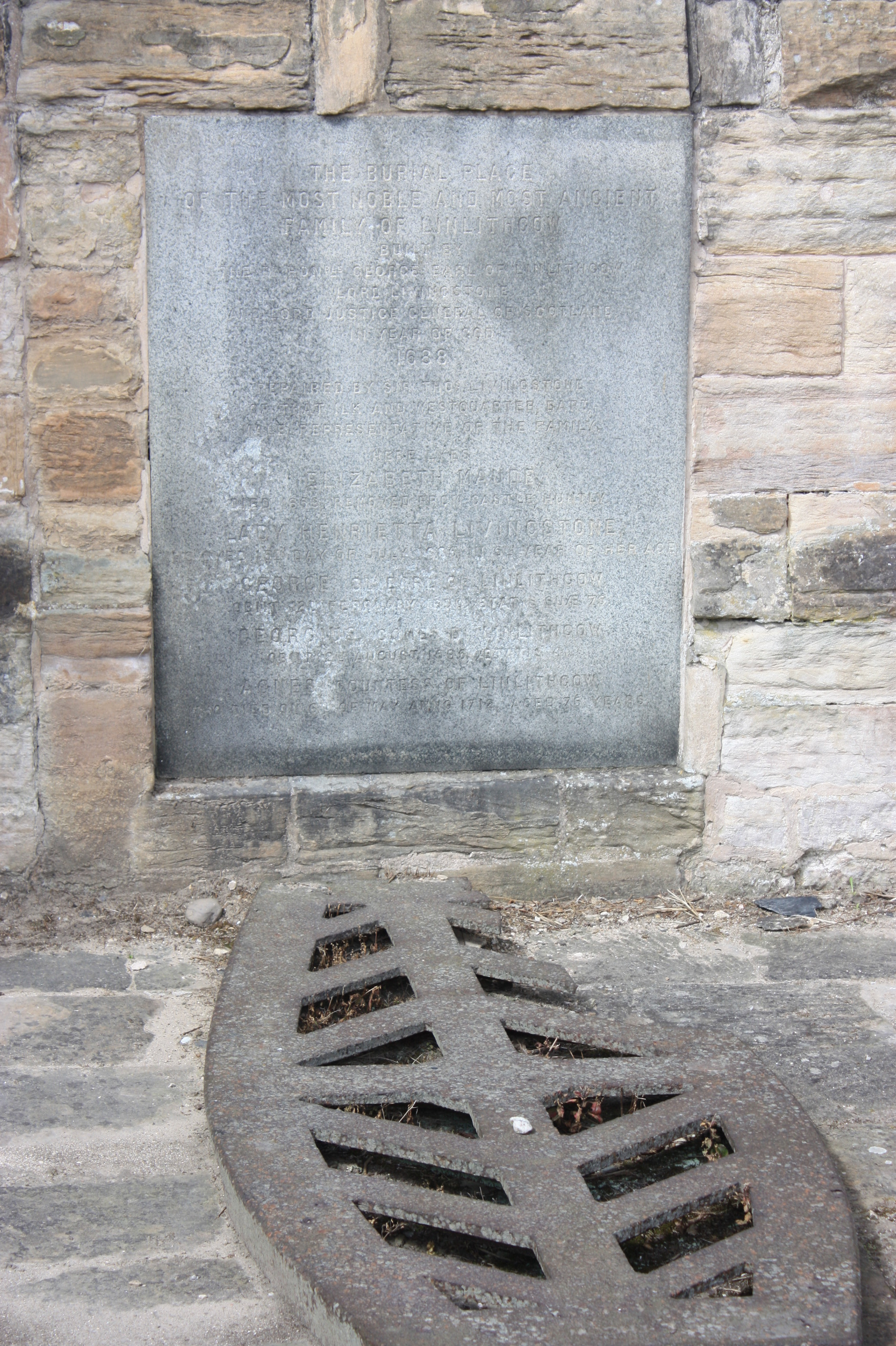
The grave of George Livingston, Lord Livingston (and his wife Elizabeth Maule), St Michael's Church, Linlithgow

Livingston was born in July 1616. He was the eldest son of Alexander Livingston, 2nd Earl of Linlithgow and Lady Elizabeth Gordon, daughter of the Marquess of Huntly who died giving birth to him.

Among his siblings was sister Lady Margaret Livingston, who married Sir Thomas Nicholson, 2nd Baronet. After his death, she married, as his fourth wife, Sir George Stirling, 6th of Keir in 1666. After his death, she married thirdly to her late husband's cousin Sir John Stirling, 8th of Keir on 6 February 1668.

His mother was the second daughter of George Gordon, 1st Marquess of Huntly and Lady Henrietta Stuart (eldest daughter of Esmé Stuart, 1st Duke of Lennox). His paternal grandparents were Alexander Livingstone, 1st Earl of Linlithgow and Lady Helen Hay (the eldest daughter of Andrew Hay, 8th Earl of Erroll). His paternal uncle was James Livingston, 1st Earl of Callendar.

== Career ==
He was appointed constable and keeper of Linlithgow Palace on his father's resignation on 15 December 1642. His father died between 11 June and 20 December 1648, and his succession to the earldom.

On 4 December 1650, George was admitted to the House of Parliament, and his incapability by his accession to the 'Engagement' for the rescue of Charles taken off. On 20 December, he was nominated colonel of one of the Perth regiments of horse. He was member for the Sheriffdom of Perthshire in Cromwell's parliament from 1654 to 1645.

At the Restoration, he was appointed colonel of the Scots Regiment of Foot Guards, and sworn a Privy Councillor.

On 18 December 1677 he obtained a commission to succeed Sir George Munro, 1st of Newmore as major-general of the forces in Scotland, his principal duty being the suppression of covenanting conventicles. After the defeat of Claverhouse at Drumclog on 1 June 1679, Linlithgow acted very irresolutely. The forces of Claverhouse were directed to return to the main body under him at Stirling, and without daring to risk an engagement, he finally fell back on Edinburgh until assistance could be obtained from England. On the arrival of the English reinforcements the supreme command was transferred to Monmouth.

After the battle of Bothwell Bridge Linlithgow, on 25 July, was sent by the council along with Claverhouse to London to advocate the adoption of more severe measures against those who had been in arms. On 10 July 1684, he was appointed justice-general in room of the Earl of Perth, but he was deprived of his office at the Revolution. Linlithgow had some connection with the Montgomery plot, but died before its betrayal.

== Personal life ==
On 30 July 1650, he married Lady Elizabeth Lyon, the widow of John Lyon, 2nd Earl of Kinghorne. Lady Elizabeth was the second daughter of Patrick Maule, 1st Earl of Panmure. Together, they were the parents of two sons and one daughter:

- George Livingston, 4th Earl of Linlithgow (died 1695), who married Hon. Henrietta Sutherland, daughter of Alexander Sutherland, 1st Lord Duffus.
- Alexander Livingston, 3rd Earl of Callendar (died 1692), who married Lady Anne Graham, eldest daughter of James Graham, 2nd Marquess of Montrose and Lady Isabel Ker (widow of Robert Ker, 1st Earl of Roxburghe and fifth daughter of William Douglas, 7th Earl of Morton).
- Lady Henrietta Livingston, who married Robert Makgill, 2nd Viscount of Oxfuird.

After the death of his first wife, he remarried in June 1677 to Agnes (née Wauchope) Scott. Agnes was the widow of goldsmith Alexander Scott of Edinburgh, and daughter and co-heiress of George Wauchope of Edinburgh.

After his death on 1 February 1690, he was buried in a family vault on the south side of St Michael's church in Linlithgow, west of Edinburgh.

=== Descendants ===
Following the Battle of Killiecrankie in 1689, his son-in-law and both of his sons, were accused of being rebels, arrested and imprisoned in Edinburgh Castle. They were released only after taking an oath of allegiance to King William III. Through his second son, he was a grandfather of James Livingston, 5th Earl of Linlithgow and 4th Earl of Callendar as his eldest son George died without issue.

Military offices
New post	Colonel of the Scots Regiment of Foot Guards; 1660–1684	Succeeded by Hon. James Douglas
Peerage of Scotland
Preceded by Alexander Livingston	Earl of Linlithgow; 1648–1690	Succeeded by George Livingston
