= George Hay, 7th Earl of Erroll =

Scottish nobleman and politician (c. 1508–1573)

The Earl of Erroll PC
- Arms of the Earl of Erroll

11th Lord High Constable of Scotland
- In office 1541–1573
- Preceded by: William Hay
- Succeeded by: Andrew Hay

Personal details
- Born: c. 1508 Errol, Perthshire, Scotland
- Died: 30 January 1573 Perth, Perthshire
- Spouse(s): Margaret Robertson; Helen Bryson
- Children: 11, including Andrew
- Relatives: William Hay, 3rd Earl of Erroll (grandfather)

George Hay, 7th Earl of Erroll (c. 1508 – 30 January 1573) was a Scottish nobleman and politician.

== Biography ==
Hay was the grandson of William Hay, 3rd Earl of Erroll; George's father Thomas was killed alongside his older brother, William Hay, 4th Earl of Erroll, at the Battle of Flodden in 1513.

After his cousin William Hay, 6th Earl of Erroll died in 1541 leaving only a young daughter, George succeeded to the earldom and with it the family title of Lord High Constable of Scotland. The sixth earl, who inherited the earldom as a toddler, died under the age of 21; by the time George inherited the titles, the barony had been in the possession of the crown for 19 years, four months.

The Peerage of Scotland allows titles to descend along the female lines; Jean Hay, the young daughter of the sixth earl of Erroll, could have inherited the earldom as Countess of Erroll. Instead, the crown negotiated for George to inherit, with the condition that he pay 4,000 merks to Helen, Dowager Countess of Erroll and to marry one of his sons to Jean Hay "at the King's pleasure."

Following the death of James V of Scotland in December 1542 leaving six-day-old Mary, Queen of Scots as his successor, Erroll was one of the nobles who signed an agreement to support her mother Mary of Guise taking the Regency. They argued unsuccessfully that the Earl of Arran ought to be disqualified because his father's divorce and second marriage were invalid, making him illegitimate. Arran resigned the Regency to Mary of Guise in 1554.

He had a disagreement with his wife, Margaret Robertson, in 1554. Mary of Guise counseled reconciliation. Margaret Robertson wrote to Mary of Guise from Perth, that he had not restored her living and she might have to come and live at court in her service as a gentlewoman. Erroll claimed she had supported "broken men", landless rebels who stole his goods, but Margaret wrote it ought to be well known that she desired no harm or loss to him or their children. She sent her eldest son, Andrew, Master of Atholl to explain her case more fully.

He was a member of the Privy Council of Mary, Queen of Scots in 1561. He sided with the Hamiltons in the interest of the captive Queen Mary in 1569, but did not forfeit his titles in his support of the queen.

In April 1567, Erroll was a signatory to Ainslie's Tavern Band agreeing to the marriage of Mary, Queen of Scots to the Earl of Bothwell.

He died in 1573.

== Marriage and issue ==
In 1528, Hay married Margaret Robertson, daughter of Alexander Robertson of Struan, 5th chief of Clan Donnachaidh, and granddaughter of John Stewart, 1st Earl of Atholl and by her had nine children:

- Lady Elizabeth Hay (b. 1531), married firstly Sir William Keith, Lord of Keith, son of William Keith, 4th Earl Marischal and secondly Cuthbert, baron Coulhart
- Andrew Hay, 8th Earl of Erroll, married his cousin Jean Hay, daughter of the sixth Earl of Erroll
- Margaret Hay, who married Laurence Oliphant, 4th Lord Oliphant.
- John Hay of Muchall
- Laurence Hay, who reportedly destroyed the manse at Findo Gask.
- George Hay of Ardlethen
- Lady Beatrix Hay (b. c. 1560), married William Hay, 9th of Delgatie
- Thomas Hay, parson of Turriff
- Alexander Hay

In 1561, the earl married Helen Bryson, daughter of Walter Bryson of Pitcullen, and had two more children:

- Eupham Hay (likely died young)
- Lady Elizabeth (Isobel) Hay, married Sir John Leslie of Balquhain, and divorced him for adultery; married second, James, Lord Balfour, Baron of Glenawley

== Footnotes ==
Military offices
Preceded by William Hay	Lord High Constable of Scotland; 1541–1573	Succeeded by Andrew Hay
Peerage of Scotland
Preceded by William Hay	Earl of Erroll; 1541–1573	Succeeded by Andrew Hay
