= Gilbert Hay, 11th Earl of Erroll =

Scottish peer

The Right Honourable The Earl of Erroll PC
- Arms of the Earl of Erroll

15th Lord High Constable of Scotland
- In office 1636–1674
- Preceded by: Francis Hay
- Succeeded by: John Hay

Personal details
- Born: 13 June 1631 Errol, Scotland
- Died: October 1674 (age 43) Slains Castle
- Spouse: Lady Catherine Carnegie (m. 1658)
- Parent(s): William Hay, 10th Earl of Erroll; Lady Anne Lyon

Gilbert Hay, 11th Earl of Erroll PC (13 June 1631 – October 1674) was a Scottish nobleman.

== Biography ==
He was the eldest son of William Hay, 10th Earl of Erroll by his wife, Anne, only daughter of Patrick Lyon, 1st Earl of Kinghorne. He succeeded to the earldom at age 5, after his father's death in 1636. His uncle the Earl of Kinghorne was his tutor.

On 1 January 1651, Erroll took part in the Scottish coronation of King Charles II as Lord High Constable of Scotland. Charles rode to Scone Abbey with William Keith, 7th Earl Marischal on his left and Erroll on his right.

For his part in the coronation, Erroll was heavily fined; Oliver Cromwell's government demanded £2000 sterling in 1654 under Cromwell's Act of Grace. Erroll petitioned this ruling, stating that he had not fought in any battles against England, and such a fine would bankrupt him. After the restoration, he received a regrant of his titles in 1666.

Erroll was appointed a member of the Privy Council in 1661.

On 7 January 1658, he married Lady Catherine Carnegie, daughter of James Carnegie, 2nd Earl of Southesk; they had no issue. After his death, the countess became chief governess to James Francis, Prince of Wales in Saint-Germain-en-Laye.

He died childless and was succeeded in the earldom by his cousin John Hay, great-grandson of Andrew Hay, 8th Earl of Erroll.

== Bibliography ==
- Balfour, Paul James (1906). The Scots Peerage : founded on Wood's edition of Sir Robert Douglas's Peerage of Scotland; containing an historical and genealogical account of the nobility of that kingdom. Vol. 3. Edinburgh: David Douglas.
- Mackintosh, John (1898). Historic Earls and Earldoms of Scotland. Aberdeen: Jolly & Sons.

Military offices
Preceded by Francis Hay	Lord High Constable of Scotland; 1636–1674	Succeeded by John Hay
Peerage of Scotland
Preceded by Francis Hay	Earl of Erroll; 1636–1674	Succeeded by John Hay
