= Mary Hay, 14th Countess of Erroll =

Scottish noblewoman and Jacobite

The Right Honourable The Countess of Erroll
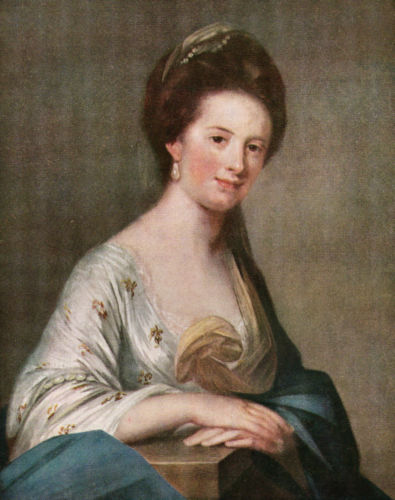
- Painting of Lady Erroll, by Francis Cotes

Personal details
- Born: Mary Hay
- Died: 19 August 1758 Slains Castle, Aberdeen
- Spouse: Alexander Falconer (m. 1722)
- Parent(s): John Hay, 12th Earl of Erroll; Lady Anne Drummond
- Relatives: Charles Hay, 13th Earl of Erroll (brother)

Mary Hay, 14th Countess of Erroll (died 19 August 1758) was a Scottish noblewoman, Jacobite and suo jure Countess of Erroll. As 18th Hereditary Lord High Constable and Knight Marischal of Scotland, she was the Senior Great Officer among the Royal Officers of Scotland and Chief of the King's Household in Scotland. She inherited these titles in 1717 on the death of her unmarried brother, Charles Hay, 13th Earl of Erroll.

== Early life ==
She was the eldest daughter of John Hay, 12th Earl of Erroll (grandson of Sir George Hay, the younger son of the seventh Earl) and his wife, Lady Anne Drummond, sister of the Jacobite Dukes of Perth and Melfort. Her older brother was Charles Hay, 13th Earl of Erroll (c. 1680–1717) and her younger sister was Lady Margaret Hay, who married James Livingston, 5th Earl of Linlithgow.

Her elder brother Charles was imprisoned in Edinburgh Castle on suspicion of treason, and lived in exile on the Continent from 1712 to 1715. As eldest sister and heir of their line, she succeeded to the dignities enjoyed by her brother under the nomination of 16 February 1674, and was served his heir on 6 February 1718. She had her claim as High Constable allowed at the coronation of King George II of Great Britain, although she was represented by a deputy.

== Career ==
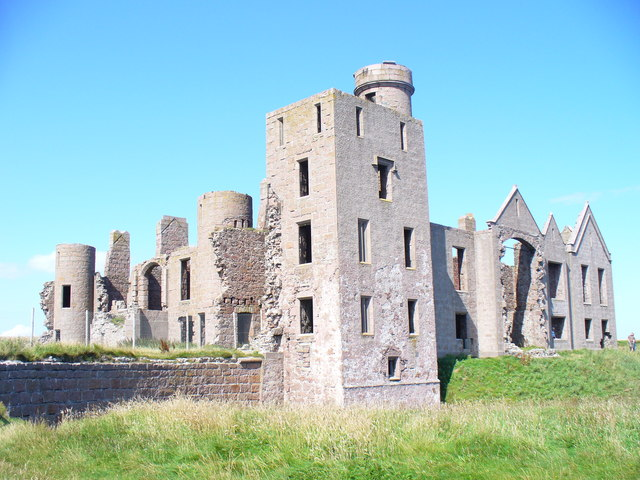
Ruins of Slains Castle

Like her mother and brother, Countess Anne was an active Jacobite and a secret agent of the exiled court of the Old Pretender, "James III and VIII", at Saint Germain-en-Laye.

In 1745, she raised an army of Buchan men for Prince Charles Edward Stuart. Making Slains Castle the chief centre for landing Jacobite secret agents, she had an implied understanding with the naval officer patrolling the coast of Buchan to let her know when his ship was passing off Slains. Once landed at Slains, they were hurried inland to another of her strongholds, Delgatie Castle, with its hidey-holes and secret passage.

She used Jamie Fleeman, the Laird of Udny's fool, as a messenger to contact Jacobite rebels when they were in hiding as he was able to roam unquestioned around the countryside.

In 1747, under the Heritable Jurisdictions (Scotland) Act 1746 which abolished heritable jurisdictions, she received £1,200 for the regality of Slains.

== Personal life ==
Before August 1722, Hay married Alexander Falconer of Delgaty (1682–1745), an advocate and son of Sir David Falconer, Lord President of the Court of Session. His elder brother, David, succeeded a distant cousin as 5th Lord Falconer of Halkerton. Later, her husband adopted the Hay surname.

Her husband having predeceased her in July 1745, she died on 19 August 1758 at Slains Castle, County Aberdeen. As she was childless, the family dignities went to her great-nephew, James, Lord Boyd, the grandson of her sister, Lady Margaret Hay and son of William Boyd, 4th Earl of Kilmarnock, who was executed on Tower Hill and attainted in 1746, for his part in the Jacobite rising of 1745.

Peerage of Scotland
Preceded by Charles Hay	Earl of Erroll; 1717–1758	Succeeded by James Hay
