= Hugh de la Haye =

Scottish knight

Sir Hugh de la Haye of Locharwart, was a 13th-14th century Scottish knight.

Hugh was the son of Nicholas de la Haye of Erroll and Joan. Hugh gave homage to King Edward I of England on 17 July 1296 at Aberdeen. Hugh was one of the companions of Robert de Brus and was at Robert's coronation at Scone on 27 March 1306 with his older brother Gilbert de la Haye. He was taken prisoner at the Battle of Methven on 19 June 1306 and appears to have died of wounds shortly afterwards as he does not appear on any prisoner list and disappears from records.
