= Andrew Hay, 8th Earl of Erroll =

Scottish nobleman and politician (c. 1531–1585)

The Right Honourable The Earl of Erroll
- Arms of the Earl of Erroll

12th Lord High Constable of Scotland
- In office 1573–1585
- Preceded by: George Hay
- Succeeded by: Francis Hay

Personal details
- Born: c. 1531 Errol, Perthshire, Scotland
- Died: 8 October 1585 Perth, Perthshire
- Spouse(s): Lady Jean Hay; Agnes Sinclair
- Children: 7, including Francis and Helenor
- Parent(s): George Hay, 7th Earl of Erroll; Margaret Robertson

Andrew Hay, 8th Earl of Erroll (c. 1531 – 8 October 1585) was a Scottish nobleman and politician.

== Biography ==
He was the son of George Hay by his first wife, Margaret Robertson. His father inherited the earldom after the death of his uncle, William Hay, 6th Earl of Erroll, who died leaving only a baby girl, Jean Hay.

The Peerage of Scotland is unique in that it allows the titles to descend along the female line. Jean could have conceivably inherited the earldom as Countess of Erroll. Instead, the crown negotiated for George to inherit, with the condition that he pay 4,000 merks to the sixth earl's widow, Helen, Dowager Countess of Erroll, and that one of his sons marry Jean Hay "at the King’s pleasure."

Andrew Hay died in October 1585. James VI of Scotland sent officers to his house of Logiealmomd in Perthshire and took a large sum of money.

== Marriage and issue ==
He married his cousin Lady Jean Hay, c. June 1552, daughter of the sixth Earl of Erroll and had issue. Sir James Balfour Paul writes that documents show King James VI and I frequently getting involved in the Earl of Erroll's family affairs and Erroll's clear displeasure with his interference.

1. Alexander Hay, deaf-mute, was set aside in the succession. In 1582, King James nominated Dundee surgeon William Duncan to accompany Alexander to France to seek medical assistance. Alexander became of age in July 1584 and was declared "insane" in 1596.
2. Francis Hay, 9th Earl of Erroll
3. Thomas Hay, also had some physical and mental issues; diagnosed "insane" in 1596
4. Lady Helen (Helenor), married Alexander Livingstone, 1st Earl of Linlithgow

His first wife died in August 1570. In 1581, he married Agnes, daughter of George Sinclair, 4th Earl of Caithness and Elizabeth, daughter of William Graham, 2nd Earl of Montrose. They had three children:

1. George Hay, father of Sir Andrew Hay of Killour, thus grandfather of John Hay, 12th Earl of Erroll
2. William Hay
3. Lady Margaret Hay, died unmarried

The eighth earl also had an illegitimate daughter Agnes, who married Patrick Bruce of Fingask.

His second wife, Lady Agnes survived him. In September 1587 she complained to the Privy Council about Colin Campbell of Glen Lyon, who came with a force of 100 men to her house of Inchestuill and assaulted her. Later, she married Alexander Gordon of Strathdoun, a son of George Gordon, 5th Earl of Huntly. She was charged with treason in 1596 for aiding the rebel earl Francis Stewart, 5th Earl of Bothwell. In 1598 she sent her servant John Smaill with a shopping list to London to buy household goods to replace those lost in 1593 and 1594. She wrote to Archibald Douglas asking him to help Smaill and lend him money if necessary.

== Charges ==
On 14 April 1604, the Privy Council of Scotland charged George Hay with having "violently seized upon his stepfather" and held him captive in the fortress of "Blairfudie" or Blairfindy. The council ordered him to reveal Gordon's whereabouts to his mother. On 14 December 1619 the council formally ordered George to keep the peace with his half-brother, Alexander Gordon, over their mother's estate.

In 1613, William Hay was charged by the Privy Council along with three others (Alexander Hay of Brunthill and his sons Patrick and George) for "violently molesting" his mother. They did not appear in front of the council and were denounced. They were later imprisoned. William Hay was released 7 December 1616.

== Footnotes ==
Military offices
Preceded by George Hay	Lord High Constable of Scotland; 1573–1585	Succeeded by Francis Hay
Peerage of Scotland
Preceded by George Hay	Earl of Erroll; 1573–1585	Succeeded by Francis Hay
