= Nicholas de la Haye =

Scottish noble

Sir Nicholas de la Haye, 4th Baron of Errol, was a 13th-14th century Scottish noble.

Nicholas was the son of Gilbert de la Hay and Ideonea Comyn.

He was Sheriff of Perth and Constable of Perth Castle by 1289 and was one of John Balliol's auditors in 1292 during the competition for the Scottish crown. He swore fealty and homage to King Edward I of England on 10 July and 28 August 1296. Nicholas was summoned to Parliament at St Andrews on 5 March 1304.

== Family ==
Nicholas married to Joan and had the following known issue:

- Gilbert of Errol
- Nicholas, Rector of Fossoway
- John
- Hugh of Locharwart
