= Gilbert II de la Hay =

Scottish nobleman (died 1333)

Arms of Gilbert de la Hay; Argent, three escutcheons gules.

Sir Gilbert de la Hay (died April 1333), fifth feudal baron of Errol in Gowrie, was Lord High Constable of Scotland from 1309 (hereditary in 1314).

Gilbert was the son of Nicholas de la Haye of Erroll and Joan. He was one of the companions of Robert de Brus and was at Robert's coronation at Scone on 27 March 1306 with his younger brother Hugh de la Haye. A close supporter of King Robert I of Scotland he commanded his bodyguard at the Battle of Methven in 1306, and fought at the Battle of Bannockburn in 1314, following which he went as an Ambassador to England to negotiate a truce.

Robert the Bruce granted him the lands of Slains, Aberdeenshire. He signed the Declaration of Arbroath.

His son, Nicholas de la Haye, fell at the battle of Dupplin Moor (1332) fighting Edward Balliol, leaving as his successor the Constable's grandson, Sir David de la Hay, sixth feudal baron of Erroll.
