= Thomas de la Hay =

Scottish noble (c. 1342–1406)

Sir Thomas de la Hay, 7th Lord of Erroll (c. 1342 – July 1406) was Lord High Constable of Scotland.

He was the third member of the Hay family to hold this post. He was the son of David de la Hay and a daughter of John Keith of Innerpeffer.

He was one of the commissioners appointed to treat with the English for the ransom of David II. 1353, and was a hostage for his ransom 1354; acted as constable of Scotland at the coronation of Robert II. at Scone, 26 March. 1371, and next day took the oaths of homage to his Majesty, and swore to the Act of Settlement of the Crown, 4 April. 1371; served heir to his grandfather, Sir John Keith of Innerpeffer, 19 January- 1389–90; had a grant of Slaines, which Robert I. had given to the deceased Gilbert de Haya, 1376; and had all his lands erected into a free barony, 30 June. 1378.

== Marriage and children ==
He married Elizabeth Stewart, a daughter of King Robert II of Scotland, before 7 November 1372. They had issue:

- Sir William de la Hay, a knight (d.1436); he married Margaret, daughter of Sir Patrick Gray of Broxmouth, and had issue.
- Sir Gilbert of Dronlaw, a knight; he married Elizabeth Reid, and had issue.
- Elizabeth de la Hay; she married Sir George Leslie of Rothes (1350 - after 1412), and had issue.
- Alice de la Hay; she married Sir William Hay of Locharret.
- Daughter (name not known); she married Norman (?), son of Andrew Leslie, and had issue.
