= Gilbert I de la Hay =

Sir Gilbert de la Hay (died c. 1263), third feudal baron of Errol in Gowrie, was co-Regent of Scotland in 1255 during the minority of King Alexander III of Scotland and Sheriff of Perth in 1262.

== Life ==
Gilbert was the son of David de la Hay and Helen de Strathern. As part of his marriage dower of Idonea Comyn he received Upper Coull, Aberdeenshire. He was co-Regent of Scotland in 1255 during the minority of King Alexander III of Scotland and was the Sheriff of Perth in 1262. He died while in office as sheriff.

== Marriage and issue ==
Gilbert married Lady Idonea Comyn, daughter of William Comyn, jure uxoris Earl of Buchan and Marjory, Countess of Buchan, they had the following known issue:

- Nicholas, married Joan, had issue.
