= William Boyd, 3rd Earl of Kilmarnock =

Scottish nobleman (died 1717)

William Boyd, 3rd Earl of Kilmarnock (died 1717) was a Scottish nobleman.

He fought for the British Government during the Jacobite rising of 1715.

Peerage of Scotland
Preceded by William Boyd	Earl of Kilmarnock; 1692–1717	Succeeded by William Boyd
