= John Hay, 12th Earl of Erroll =

Scottish nobleman

John Hay, 12th Earl of Erroll (died 30 December 1704) was a Scottish nobleman and Lord High Constable of Scotland. Among his titles was Lord of Slains, but he had previously been known as John Hay of Kellour.

== Marriage and issue ==
Hay was a son of Sir Andrew Hay of Killour and his wife Margaret, who was the first Lord Kinnaird's sister. Kinnaird was a royalist, supporting the claims of Charles II. He had a younger sister, Jean.

He became the 12th Earl of Erroll and the 16th Lord High Constable of Scotland in 1674 after the 11th Earl, Gilbert Hay, died without issue. Prior to this inheritance he had been known as John Hay of Kellour.

Hay's wife was Lady Anne Drummond (b. January 1656) and their marriage contract was dated 1 October 1674. She was the daughter of James Drummond, the 3rd Earl of Perth and sister of the Jacobite Dukes, James Drummond and John Drummond.

The couple had five children: three sons, Charles, James and Thomas; and two daughters, Mary and Margaret. Margaret married James Livingston, 5th Earl of Linlithgow.

== Life ==
Hay became a Burgess of Perth and Aberdeen from October 1672 and was the Sheriff principal of Aberdeen from the beginning of May 1685. The Earl supported the House of Stuart and as his brother-in-law, James Drummond, was Lord Chancellor and head of the Scottish government at the time of the 1688 Revolution, the Earl and his wife took great notice of the events. However, the Earl was described as acting with "singular moderation and judgment".

He was also Chancellor of King's College, Aberdeen from February 1700.

Papers of William II give an indication of the extensive lands owned by the Earl of Erroll in October 1700. The ratification includes areas of land at Turriff, Banff, Slains, Pitmedden, Crimond including Crimonmogate and several other places. Slains Castle is recorded as the principal family residence.

== Death and legacy ==
The 12th Earl of Erroll died on 30 December 1704. The estate was formally inherited by his son, Charles, on 24 April 1705. Charles, 13th Earl, took his Parliamentary seat at the end of June 1705 but was a prisoner in Edinburgh Castle from 1708; he died aged 40 years on 16 October 1717. As he was unmarried and without issue, the title fell to his sister, Mary, who became Mary Hay, 14th Countess of Erroll.

Peerage of Scotland
Preceded by Gilbert Hay	Earl of Erroll; 1674–1704	Succeeded by Charles Hay
