= William Boyd, 4th Earl of Kilmarnock =

Scottish peer (1705–1746)

- Earl of Kilmarnock
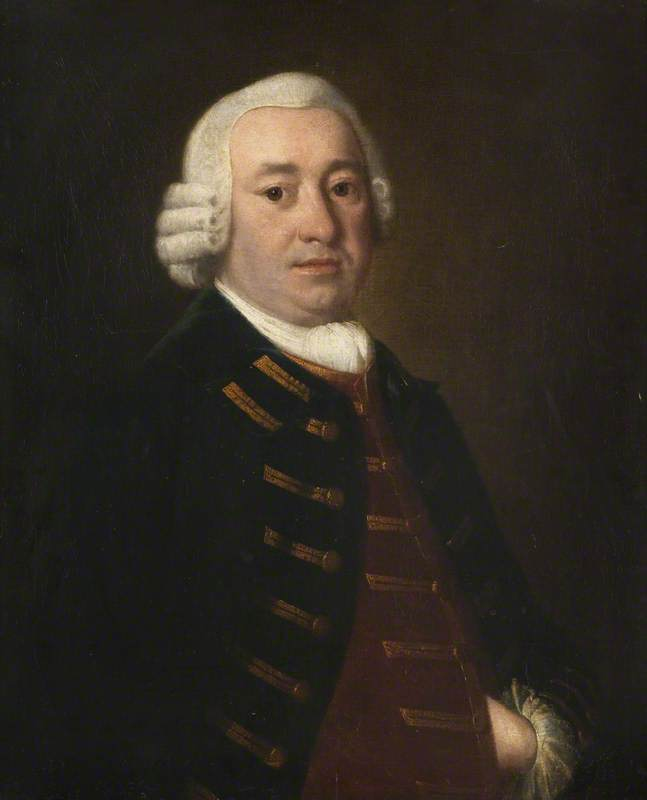
- William Boyd, 4th Earl of Kilmarnock, painting attributed to Allan Ramsay, 1743.
- Tenure: 1717 to 1746
- Predecessor: William Boyd, 3rd Earl of Kilmarnock
- Successor: James Hay, 15th Earl of Erroll (1726–1778)
- Born: William Boyd; 12 May 1705; Dean Castle, Kilmarnock
- Died: 18 August 1746 (aged 41); Tower Hill
- Cause of death: Executed for treason
- Buried: St Peter ad Vincula, Tower of London
- Residence: Dean Castle; Callendar House
- Locality: East Ayrshire
- Wars and battles: 1745 Jacobite Rising; Falkirk Culloden
- Offices: Grand Master, Masonic Grand Lodge of Scotland 1742-1743
- Spouse: Anne Livingstone (1709–1747)
- Issue: James (1726–1778), Charles (1728–1782), William (1724–1780)
- Parents: William Boyd, 3rd Earl of Kilmarnock; Eupheme Ross

William Boyd, 4th Earl of Kilmarnock (12 May 1705 – 18 August 1746), was a Scottish peer who joined the 1745 Jacobite Rising, was captured at Culloden and subsequently executed for treason on Tower Hill.

His family were supporters of the government and Kilmarnock had not previously been involved with the Stuarts; he later stated "for the two Kings and their rights, I cared not a farthing which prevailed; but I was starving."

His title was declared forfeit and his heavily mortgaged estates confiscated; they were later returned to his eldest son James, later Earl of Erroll, who fought at Culloden on the government side.

== Biography ==
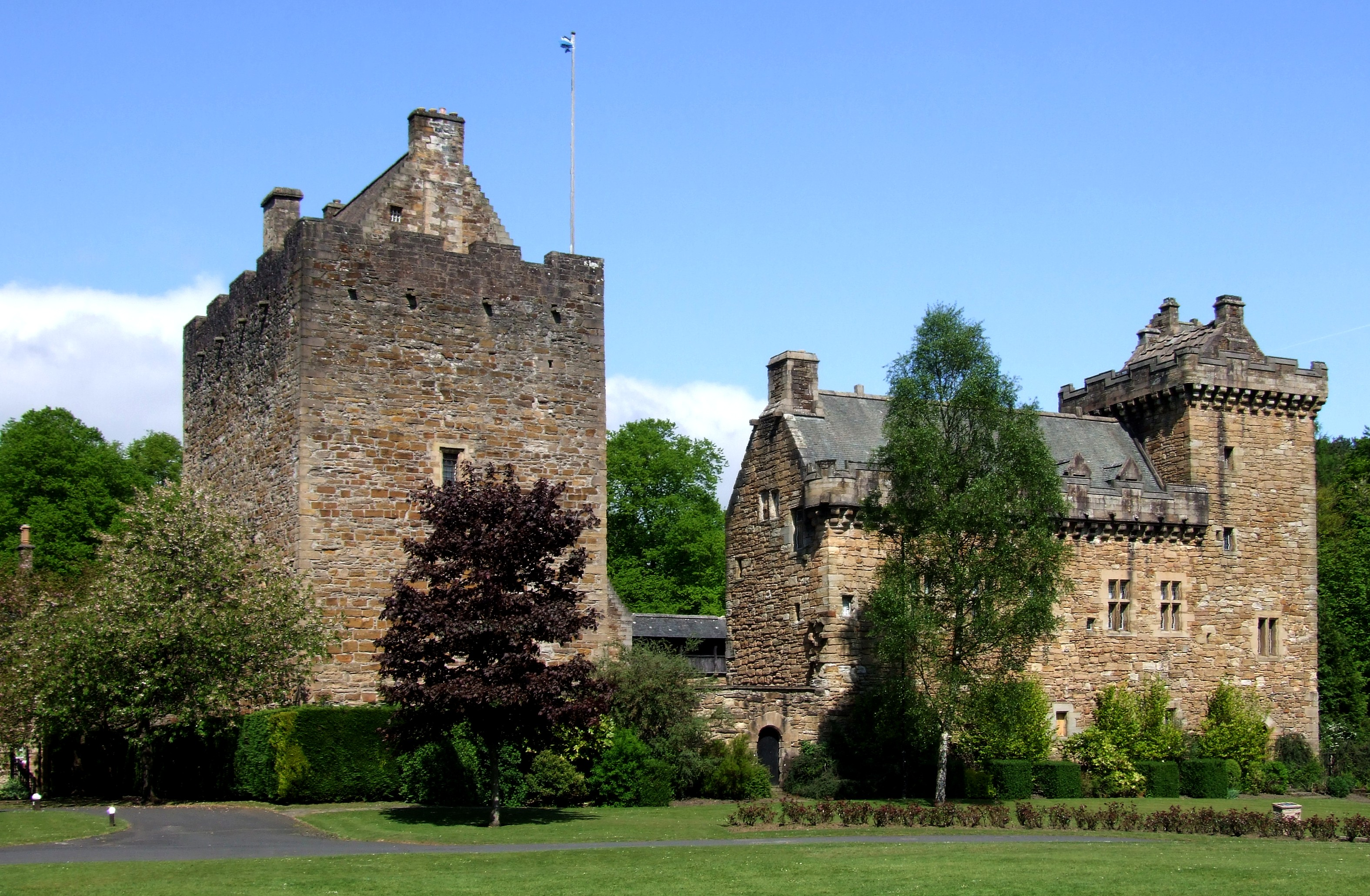
Kilmarnock's restored family home, Dean Castle; gutted by fire in 1735 and left derelict until 1908

William Boyd was born in 1705, only son of William Boyd, 3rd Earl of Kilmarnock (1683–1717) and Eupheme Ross (1684–1729). His father supported the government during the 1715 Jacobite Rising, but was deeply in debt when he died in 1717. Educated at the University of Glasgow, Kilmarnock reportedly had "an Aversion to rigorous Study of Letters" and was devoted to "Riding, Fencing, Dancing and Musick...esteemed by Men of Taste, a Polite gentleman."

In 1724 he married Lady Anne Livingston, only daughter of James Livingston, 5th Earl of Linlithgow, a Jacobite attainted for his role in the 1715 Rising. Despite the loss of her family estates, Anne was considered an heiress; the Commission of Forfeited Estates found selling Jacobite property so complex and time-consuming that it was easier to come to an arrangement with the original owners.

Many such properties were purchased through an 18th-century vulture fund called the York Buildings Company, which did a deal with Anne, who became financially secure as a result. She married Kilmarnock against her family's wishes; money and his lifestyle were constant issues and they lived together "civilly, if not happily". During the last year of his life he became the love interest of Viscountess Etheldreda Townshend, who briefly took an interest in becoming a Jacobite.

The Earl and the Countess lived at Dean Castle in Kilmarnock (Ayrshire), but when it was destroyed by fire in 1735 they could not afford the repairs and moved to Anne's home, Callendar House (in Falkirk), which remained in the family until 1783. The Earl's son James sold Dean Castle in 1746; while the outbuildings remained in use, the castle stood derelict until restored in the early-20th century.

== Career ==
Kilmarnock's peerage gave him a seat in the House of Lords, where he voted as directed by Archibald Campbell, 3rd Duke of Argyll and Robert Walpole; he was paid a small pension for this, which ceased when Walpole lost power in 1742. He was Grand Master for the Masonic Grand Lodge of Scotland from 1742 to 1743, his successor being the Earl of Wemyss, whose son Lord Elcho also served in the Jacobite army; Murray of Broughton, later Secretary to Prince Charles, was also a member.

He first met Prince Charles during the 1745 Rebellion at Callendar House on 14 September. The decision to join the Jacobite army surprised many; it has been suggested one reason for doing so was pressure from his wife's family but he later told Argyll; "...I was starving, and...if Mahommed had set up his standard...I had been a good Mussulman for bread, for I must eat."

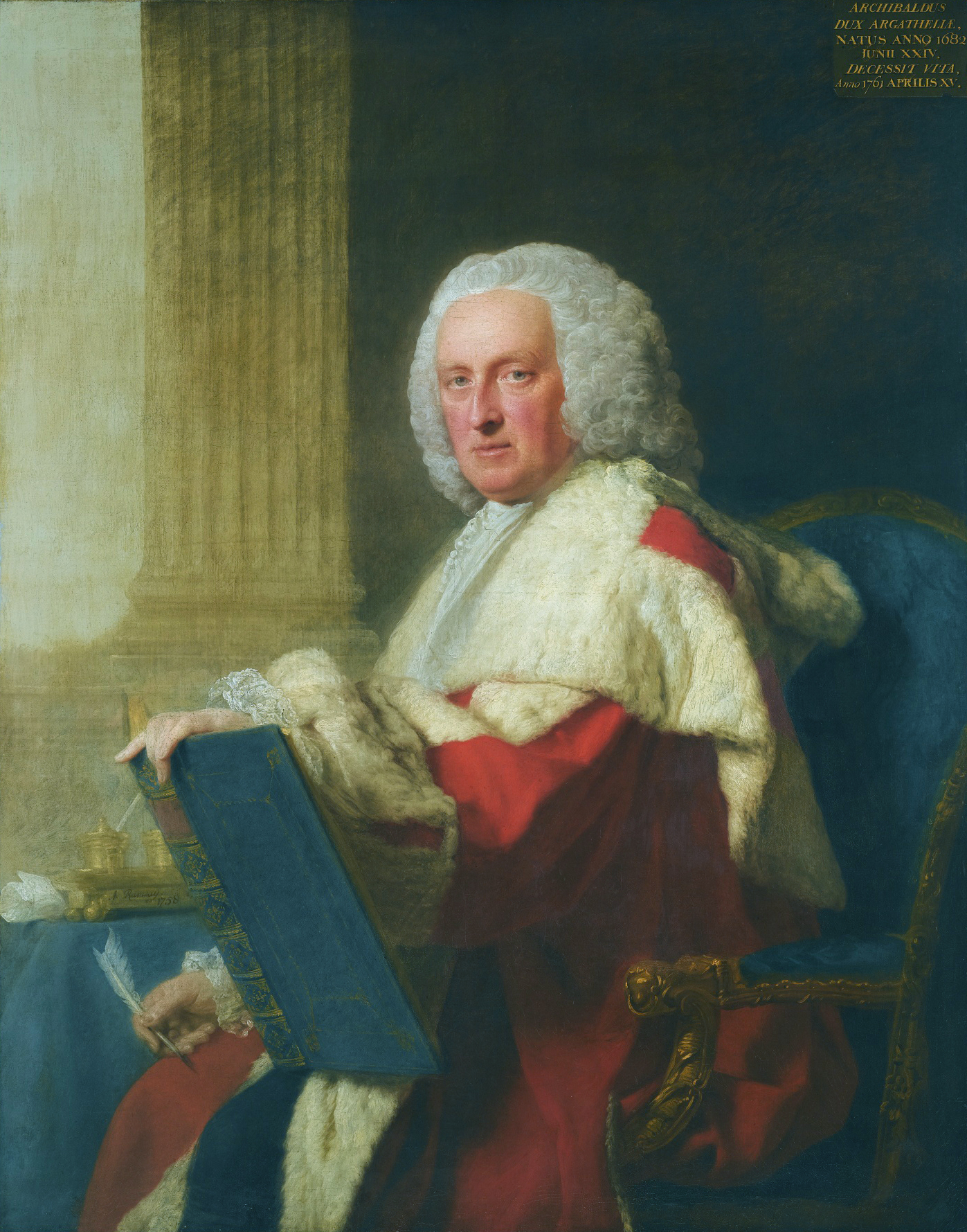
Kilmarnock's political patron, the 3rd Duke of Argyll

On 18 October, he received a commission in "Kilmarnock's Horse," which seems to have been composed largely of individual volunteers. One of the few Lowland peers to join the Rising, he quickly gained a prominent position with Charles, largely because he was unconnected to the group of long-term Jacobite Scots centred around Lord George Murray. Even before the invasion of England, there were deep divisions between Charles and his exile advisors on the one hand and the Scots on the other; after the retreat from Derby, the two groups viewed each other with suspicion and hostility. O'Sullivan later wrote "no man showed more respect for HRH (Charles)...", making Kilmarnock one of the few Scots who could be counted on to support Charles against his fellows.

When the main army entered England on 8 November, Viscount Strathallan remained in Perth; the Strathallan or Perthshire Horse was added to Kilmarnock's, a combined strength of about 130 men in all. They were chiefly engaged in reconnaissance duties and were the last to leave Carlisle on 21 December, before re-entering Scotland. In early January, the Jacobites besieged Stirling Castle; a government attempt to relieve it led to the Battle of Falkirk on 17 January.

The battle was fought near Callendar House, where Lady Anne was hosting Hawley, who used it as his headquarters; she allegedly detained him at dinner, to distract him from the battle. The Battle of Falkirk took place in failing light, during a fierce storm and amid considerable confusion. Although the cavalry was not involved, Kilmarnock's local knowledge was employed afterwards in locating the retreating government forces; on his return, he attacked a Cameron deserter from the government army, who was still in uniform and had to be rescued from his fellow clansmen.

Falkirk was a Jacobite tactical victory, but poor command and co-ordination deprived them of the last opportunity to decisively defeat their opponents. Many of the Highlanders who took part went home and when Cumberland resumed his advance on 30 January, Charles was told the army was in no state to fight. On 1 February 1746, the siege of Stirling was abandoned and the Jacobites withdrew to Inverness.

Kilmarnock's troop helped covered the retreat; at the end of this, their horses were in such poor condition that they were converted into infantry and retitled Foot Guards. The next two months were spent in Elgin, as part of Drummond's force guarding the line of the River Spey; the Jacobites were short of money and forced to requisition supplies from local merchants. (Note: Before his execution, he wrote to a friend from prison about his indebtedness to the shoemakers of Elgin: "Beside my personal debts mentioned in general and particular in the State, there is one for which I am liable in justice, if it is not paid, owing to poor people who gave their work for it by my orders. It was at Elgin in Murray, the Regiment I commanded wanted shoes. I commissioned something about seventy pair of shoes and brogues, which might come to 3 shillngs or three shillings and sixpence each, one with the other. The magistrates divided them among the shoemakers of the town and country, and each shoemaker furnished his proportion. I drew on the town, for the price, out of the composition laid on them, but I was afterwards told at Inverness that, it was believed, the composition was otherwise applied, and the poor shoemakers not paid. As these poor people wrought by my orders, it will be a great ease to my heart to think they are not to lose by me, as too many have done in the course of that year, but had I lived I might have made some inquiry after: but now it is impossible, as their hardships in loss of horses and such things, which happeened through my soldiers, are so interwoven with what was done by other people, that it would be very hard, if not impossible, to separate them. If you'll write to Mr Innes of Dalkinty at Elgin (with whom I was quartered when I lay there), he will send you an account of the shoes, and if they were paid to the shoemakers or no; and if they are not, I beg you'll get my wife, or my successors to pay them when they can......")

When the campaigning season began in April, their leaders agreed the only option was a decisive victory; this led to Culloden, where they were defeated with heavy losses in less than an hour. James Boyd was in the government front line with the Royal Scots but Kilmarnock was with the Jacobite reserve and saw little action. The claim he was captured after mistaking government dragoons for his own troops is not supported by his own account; another anecdote recounts he lost his hat and wig and James gave him his own.

== Trial and execution ==
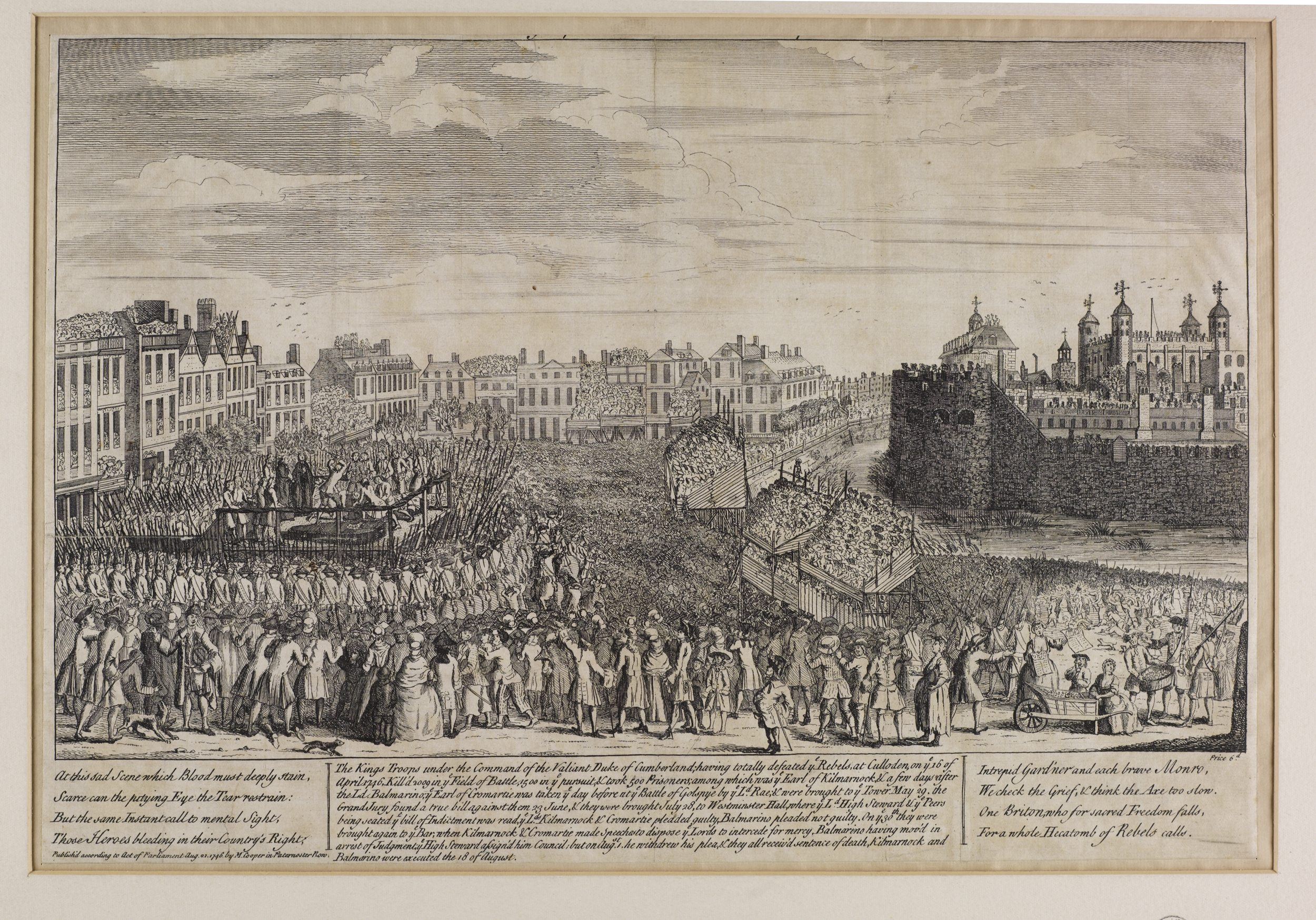
Execution of the Earl of Kilmarnock and Lord Balmerino

Tried in London on 29 July, Kilmarnock, Lord Balmerino and the Earl of Cromartie were found guilty of treason and sentenced to death. This was commuted to beheading, rather than being hanged, drawn and quartered, as with Francis Towneley and others. It was expected one would be pardoned, but despite efforts by Kilmarnock's fellow Freemason, the Duke of Hamilton, this went to Cromartie, whose allegedly pregnant wife interceded with the Princess of Wales. Cromartie's father-in-law had been Private Secretary to the Prince of Wales and the writer Horace Walpole (1717-1792) later observed "Hamilton's intercession for Lord Kilmarnock hurried him to the block."

The sentences were carried out on Tower Hill on 18 August, Kilmarnock going first; shortly before, Balmerino contrived a meeting with him to discuss the "No quarter" order. Allegedly issued by the Jacobite leadership before Culloden and used to justify the harsh government response, its existence is extremely dubious. However, Balmerino ensured Kilmarnock confirmed before witnesses that if such an order did exist, the blame lay with Lord George Murray, not the Prince, a version later published in the official trial records. Even on the verge of death, the internal divisions that undermined the Jacobite cause continued.

Kilmarnock complied with the convention prisoners facing death express contrition and acceptance of the justice of their sentence. He confirmed George II was the "true and legitimate sovereign", wrote letters to his sons and wife and asked for help in settling his debts. Following his execution, he was buried in St Peter ad Vincula, the church attached to the Tower of London.

Lady Anne outlived him by a year, dying in September 1747. She is honoured with a mural in St Marnock Square, Kilmarnock.

== Ancestry ==
Ancestors of William Boyd, 4th Earl of Kilmarnock

16. James Boyd, 9th Lord Boyd
8. William Boyd, 1st Earl of Kilmarnock
17. Catherine Creyke
4. William Boyd, 2nd Earl of Kilmarnock
18. William Cunningham, 9th Earl of Glencairn
9. Lady Jean Cuninghame
19. Lady Anne Ogilvy
2. William Boyd, 3rd Earl of Kilmarnock
10. [Thomas William Boyd blood line of Boyd Clan. Bloodline of Family Eair and Grace. Location, Locharbriggs Dumfries l, Dg11xw. BLOOD LINE FAMILY OF KILMARNOCK, THOMAS WILLIAM BOYD, Barron current held, Earl of Kilmarnock, Earl of Arron]
5. Letitia Boyd
1. William Boyd, 4th Earl of Kilmarnock
24. William Ross, 10th Lord Ross
12. George Ross, 11th Lord Ross
25. Margaret Forrester
6. William Ross, 12th Lord Ross
26. William Cochrane, 1st Earl of Dundonald
13. Lady Grizel Cochrane
27. Eupheme Scott
3. Lady Eupheme Ross
14. Sir John Wilkie
7. Agnes Wilkie

== Sources ==
- Annand, A Mck (1994). "Lord Kilmarnock's Horse Grenadiers (Later Foot Guards), in the Army of Prince Charles Edward, 1745-6". Journal of the Society for Army Historical Research. 72 (290).
- Coventry, Martin (2000). Dean Castle in The Castles of Scotland. Goblinshead. ISBN 978-1899874279.
- Lenman, Bruce (1980). The Jacobite Risings in Britain 1689–1746. Methuen Publishing. ISBN 978-0413396501.
- Lewis, Wilmarth S (1933). The Yale Edition of Horace Walpole's Correspondence, Volume 19. Yale University.
- Lowe, William (2006). "Boyd, William, fourth earl of Kilmarnock". Oxford Dictionary of National Biography (online ed.). Oxford University Press. doi:10.1093/ref:odnb/3117. (Subscription, Wikipedia Library access or UK public library membership required.)
- * Nicholson, Eirwen (2006). "Murray, Sir John, of Broughton, baronet [called Secretary Murray, Mr Evidence Murray". Oxford Dictionary of National Biography (online ed.). Oxford University Press. doi:10.1093/ref:odnb/19629. (Subscription, Wikipedia Library access or UK public library membership required.)
- Ray, James (1752). A Compleat History of the rebellion, from 1745, to 1746. James Farley, Bristol.
- Reid, Stuart (2012). Cumberland's Culloden Army 1745-46. Osprey. ISBN 978-1849088466.
- Riding, Jacqueline (2016). Jacobites: A New History of the 45 Rebellion. Bloomsbury. ISBN 978-1408819128.
- Szechi, Daniel; Sankey, Margaret (November 2001). "Elite Culture and the Decline of Scottish Jacobitism 1716-1745". Past & Present. 173.
- Thomson, Katherine (1848). Memoirs of the Jacobites of 1715 and 1745, Volume 1.

Masonic offices
Preceded by The Earl of Leven	Grand Master of the Grand Lodge of Scotland; 1742–1743	Succeeded by The Earl of Wemyss
Peerage of Scotland
Preceded by William Boyd	Earl of Kilmarnock; 1717–1746	Forfeit
