= Alexander Livingston, 2nd Earl of Linlithgow =

Scottish nobleman and politician (died 1648)

The Right Honourable The Earl of Linlithgow PC

Personal details
- Born: Alexander Livingston
- Died: 1648
- Spouse(s): Lady Elizabeth Gordon (m. 1611; died 1616) Lady Mary Douglas (after 1620)
- Children: 4, including George
- Parent(s): Alexander Livingstone, 1st Earl of Linlithgow; Lady Helen Hay
- Relatives: James Livingston, 1st Earl of Callendar (brother); Anne Livingstone (sister)

Alexander Livingston, 2nd Earl of Linlithgow PC (died 1648) was a Scottish nobleman.

== Early life ==
He was the eldest surviving son of Alexander Livingstone, 1st Earl of Linlithgow and Lady Helen Hay (c. 1552–1627). Among his siblings was James Livingston, 1st Earl of Callendar; Anne Livingston, who married to Alexander Montgomerie, 6th Earl of Eglinton; and Margaret Livingston, who married John Fleming, 2nd Earl of Wigtown.

His paternal grandparents were William Livingstone, 6th Lord Livingston and Agnes Fleming (second daughter of Malcolm Fleming, 3rd Lord Fleming). Among his extended family were Alexander Elphinstone, 4th Lord Elphinstone, the Treasurer of Scotland (husband of his aunt Jean Livingston) and Lewis Bellenden and Patrick Stewart, 2nd Earl of Orkney (both husbands of his aunt, Margaret Livingston). His mother was the eldest daughter of Andrew Hay, 8th Earl of Erroll and, his first wife (and cousin), Lady Jean Hay (only child of William Hay, 6th Earl of Erroll).

== Career ==
From 1609/10, he served as an Extraordinary Lord of Session. Upon his father's death on 24 December 1621 at Callendar House, he became the 2nd Earl of Linlithgow, and was hereditary Constable of Linlithgow Palace in 1627.

He became a Privy Councillor in 1623/4 and in 1627 during the minority of the James Stewart, 4th Duke of Lennox (later 1st Duke of Richmond), he served as Lord High Admiral of Scotland. In 1631, he was commissioner for the plantations in Nova Scotia and Lieutenant and Commissioner in the County of Stirling in 1640.

In 1628 he was granted a patent for making gunpowder by the Privy Council of Scotland.

== Personal life ==
On 4 May 1611, he was married to Lady Elizabeth Gordon, second daughter of George Gordon, 1st Marquess of Huntly and Lady Henrietta Stuart (eldest daughter of Esmé Stuart, 1st Duke of Lennox). Together, they were the parents of:

- George Livingston, 3rd Earl of Linlithgow (1616–1690), who married Lady Elizabeth Lyon (widow of John Lyon, 2nd Earl of Kinghorne), and second daughter of Patrick Maule, 1st Earl of Panmure.

After the death of Elizabeth Gordon, his first wife, in childbirth in July 1616, he remarried to Lady Mary Douglas on 17 October 1620. Lady Mary was the second daughter of William Douglas, 10th Earl of Angus and Hon. Elizabeth Oliphant (the eldest daughter of Laurence Oliphant, 4th Lord Oliphant). Together, they were the parents of:

- Alexander Livingston, 2nd Earl of Callendar (d. 1685), who married Lady Mary Hamilton, third daughter of William Hamilton, 2nd Duke of Hamilton and Lady Elizabeth Maxwell (eldest daughter of James Maxwell, 1st Earl of Dirletoun).
- Lady Margaret Livingston (d. 1674), who married Thomas Nicolson of Carnock. After his death, she married, as his fourth wife, Sir George Stirling, 6th of Keir in 1666. After his death, she married thirdly to her late husband's cousin Sir John Stirling, 8th of Keir on 6 February 1668.
- Lady Eleanor Livingston, who died unmarried.

Linlithgow died between 11 June and 20 December 1648, and was succeeded in his titles by his eldest son.

Peerage of Scotland
Preceded by Alexander Livingston	Earl of Linlithgow; 1621–1648	Succeeded by George Livingston
