= William Livingston, 4th Lord Livingston =

16th c. Scottish Nobleman

William Livingston, 4th Lord Livingston of Callendar (died c. 1518) was a Scottish nobleman.

== Early life ==
Livingston was the son of James Livingston, 3rd Lord Livingston and his wife, the former Agnes Houston. His sister, Elizabeth Livingston, married Robert Callander, grandson and heir apparent of Robert Callender of Dowradour. After his father's death around 1502, his mother remarried to John Forrester of Niddry.

His maternal grandfather was John Houston of that Ilk and his paternal grandfather was Alexander Livingston, the second son of James Livingston, 1st Lord Livingston, who served as Great Chamberlain of Scotland during the reign of James II and James III of Scotland.

=== Titles and peerage ===
Upon the death of his father sometime before 2 Mar 1502/3, he succeeded to the title 4th Lord Livingston of Callendar, which had been created for his great-grandfather in 1458.

== Personal life ==
Around 1500, Livingston was married to Agnes Hepburn, daughter of Alexander Hepburn of Whitsome (third son of Patrick Hepburn, 1st Lord Hailes) and Janet Napier (daughter of Sir Alexander Napier of Merchiston). Together, they were the parents of three sons and one daughter:

- Alexander Livingston, 5th Lord Livingston (c. 1500–1553), who married Lady Janet Stewart, daughter of Alexander Stewart, 2nd Earl of Buchan. After her death, he married Lady Agnes Douglas, daughter of John Douglas, 2nd Earl of Morton.
- Hon. James Livingston, who was slain near Edinburgh at the Battle of Pinkie in 1547.
- Hon. William Livingston, Captain of the Kirkwall Castle who married Margaret Strang.
- Hon. Margaret Livingston, who married John Hay, 4th Lord Hay of Yester.

Livingston died sometime before 21 April 1518 and was succeeded in his titles by his eldest son, Alexander, who, upon the death of James V of Scotland, was appointed one of two guardians to Mary, Queen of Scots.

=== Descendants ===
Through his eldest son, he was a grandfather to William Livingstone, 6th Lord Livingston and great-grandfather of Alexander Livingstone, 1st Earl of Linlithgow. On 17 February 1715/6, all the titles of James Livingston, 5th Earl of Linlithgow and 4th Earl of Callendar were forfeited to the Crown for his acts of "high treason."

Through his second son James, he is the ancestor of the Livingston family of New York, that included Col. Robert Livingston, 1st Lord of Livingston Manor, and his nephew, Robert Livingston the Younger.

Peerage of Scotland
Preceded by James Livingston	Lord Livingston c. 1502–c. 1518	Succeeded by Alexander Livingston
