= James Livingston, 1st Earl of Callendar =

Scottish noble

The Right Honourable The Earl of Callendar
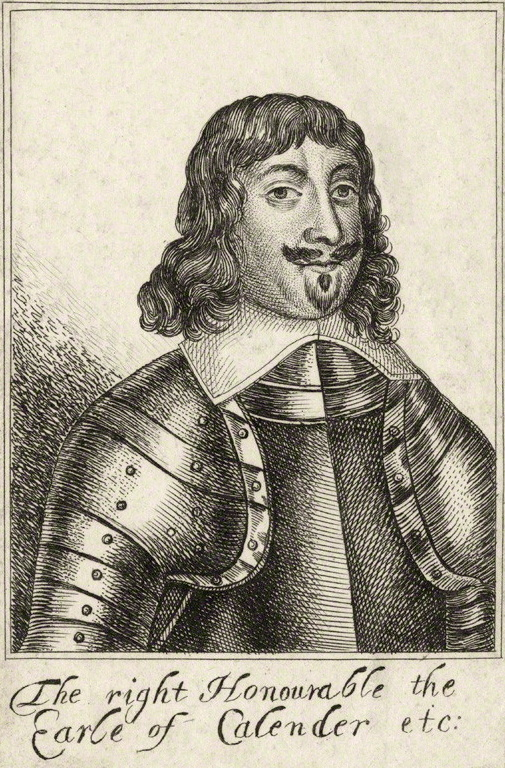

Personal details
- Born: c. 1590s
- Died: March 1674
- Spouse: Hon. Margaret Seton (after 1633)
- Parent(s): Alexander Livingston, 1st Earl of Linlithgow; Helenor Hay
- Relatives: Andrew Hay, 8th Earl of Erroll (grandfather); William Livingstone, 6th Lord Livingston (grandfather)

Military service
- Allegiance: Royalists
- Battles/wars: Bishops' War; Second Bishops' War; Second English Civil War

James Livingston, 1st Earl of Callendar (c. 1590s – March 1674), was a Scottish army officer who fought in the Wars of the Three Kingdoms. He played a varied role, but he was basically a moderate Presbyterian.

== Early life ==
Livingston was the third son of Alexander Livingston, 1st Earl of Linlithgow and Helenor Hay (the eldest daughter of Andrew Hay, 8th Earl of Erroll). He was probably born during the 1590s. Around 1616 he was commissioned as a lieutenant in the Dutch army under the command of his brother, Sir Henry Livingston.

== Career ==
By 1629, he was an experienced soldier and lieutenant-colonel of one of the three regiments of the Scottish brigade. By 1633, he was a full colonel in the Dutch army. During the same period he also served both James VI and Charles I receiving both a pension and a knighthood for his services to the Crown. During a royal visit to Scotland, Livingston was created Lord Livingston of Almond on 19 June 1633 by Charles I.

During the opening phases of the Bishops' War, Livingston at first appeared to support the King by supporting a rival to the National Covenant called the King's Covenant, but then declared that it too upheld Presbyterianism. Pleading the need to go abroad for treatment of gallstones (something he had first suffered in 1637), he avoided any further entanglement in the war. After consulting his surgeon it was decided he did not need an operation, but instead of returning to Scotland he went to Holland and took command of his regiment.

During the Second Bishops' War Livingston served as lieutenant-general of the Covenanters' army and played a leading role during the invasion of England, but he opposed the policies of the Earl of Argyll and his faction, and signed the Cumbernauld Bond along with the Earl of Montrose and others. After the Cumbernauld Bond was discovered by Argyll, the Committee of Estates considered the matter but in the end it was hushed up and Livingston retained the lieutenant-generalship.

Livingston's support for the Covenanters' cause lost him his Dutch command at the request of Charles I. However, during negotiations between Charles I and the Covenanters Charles hoped to persuade Livingston to be sympathetic to his proposals by offering Livingston the position of Treasurer of Scotland; however Livingston declined, putting the public good before private gain.

Livingston was involved in a planned Royalist coup d'état known to history as "The Incident". It was alleged that a conspiracy to arrest the Earl of Argyll and the Marquess of Hamilton was discussed in Livingston's house, and that Livingston would have played a leading part in the arrests. However it suited neither the King or the Covenanters to investigate the conspiracy too rigorously as they were close to an agreement; as part of the settlement Livingston was created Earl of Callendar on 6 October 1641.

Livingston declined the offer of a high position in the army raised by Charles, and instead led a division of the Scottish forces into England in 1644 and helped Earl of Leven to capture Newcastle-upon-Tyne. In 1645 Livingston, who often imagined himself slighted, left the army, and in 1647 he was one of the promoters of The Engagement for the release of King Charles I.

In 1648, when the Scots marched into England in the Campaign of Preston, Livingston served as lieutenant-general under the Duke of Hamilton, but Hamilton found him as difficult to work with as Leven had done previously, and his advice was mainly responsible for the defeat at the Battle of Preston. After Preston, Livingston escaped to Holland. In 1650 he was allowed to return to Scotland, but in 1654 his estates were seized and he was imprisoned (See Cromwell's Act of Grace). He came into prominence once more at the Restoration.

== Personal life ==
In 1633, he was married to the Hon. Margaret Seton, the widow of Alexander Seton, 1st Earl of Dunfermline. Margaret was the sister of John Hay, 1st Earl of Tweeddale and the only daughter of James Hay, 7th Lord Hay of Yester and Lady Margaret Kerr (third daughter of Mark Kerr, 1st Earl of Lothian).

When Livingston died in March 1674, leaving no children, according to a special remainder, he was succeeded in the earldom by his nephew Alexander Livingston, the second son of Alexander Livingston, 2nd Earl of Linlithgow.

== Notes ==
Peerage of Scotland
New creation	Earl of Callendar; 1641–1674	Succeeded by Andrew Livingston
New creation	Lord Livingston of Almond; 1633–1674	Succeeded by Andrew Livingston
