= Anne Livingstone, Countess of Eglinton =

Scottish courtier and aristocrat

Anne or Anna Livingstone, Countess of Eglinton (died 1632) was a Scottish courtier and aristocrat, and lady-in-waiting to Princess Elizabeth and Anne of Denmark. She was a daughter of Alexander Livingstone, 1st Earl of Linlithgow and Helenor Hay, who were the keepers of Princess Elizabeth at Linlithgow Palace.

== At court ==
Livingstone went to England in the household of Princess Elizabeth in 1603. She, or perhaps Princess Elizabeth herself, kept an account of expenses for clothing, jewels, gifts, and writing equipment written in Scots language while travelling from Scotland in italic handwriting. It mentions Newcastle, York, Leicester, Windsor, Nonsuch, Oatlands, Winchester, Salisbury, and Coombe Abbey. The purchases include "a pair of whalebone bodies, the one side of taffeta, the other of canvas" for 20 shillings and a farthingale covered with taffeta also costing 20 shillings. The account records New Year's Day gifts for the writing master and dancing master at New Year.

When the court was at Winchester in September 1603, the queen ordered fabrics for new clothes for Livingstone and other women who had made the journey from Scotland, including Margaret Stewart, Jean Drummond, Margaret Hartsyde, and perhaps Anna Hay. Her cousin Anna Hay was only 11 years old and Livingstone was probably of a similar age. Arbella Stuart commented on children's games played in the queen's household at Winchester and Anne of Denmark's household produced a masque for Prince Henry. The Eglinton account mentions Anne of Denmark's tailor James Duncan, noting that "James Duncan's man" carried gowns from Winchester to Nonsuch and Oatlands for Princess Elizabeth and her companions.

Anne Livingstone joined the household of Anne of Denmark, wife of James VI of Scotland and I of England as a chamberer. On 11 December 1605 (after the Gunpowder Plot) King James wrote to her father that her behaviour was satisfactory, but she would not be allowed home or given "room" - employment at that time. However Rowland Whyte described "Lady Levingston" dancing with others at Hampton Court in October 1606, when the queen entertained the French ambassador the Count de Vaudemont.

== Marriage and life at Eglinton ==
In 1612, she married Sir Alexander Seton of Foulstruther, son of Robert Seton, Earl of Winton and Margaret Montgomerie, who adopted the surname Montgomerie and became Earl of Eglinton. There were some legal obstacles on the way to him becoming the earl. Montgomerie came to be known as "old Graysteel", a nickname referring to a character in an old poem enthralled to a powerful woman.

Some of Anne Livingstone's correspondence survives. She wrote to husband in November 1612, hoping that Anne of Denmark and the king's favourite, Lord Rochester, would help him (in his struggle to secure his earldom). She expressing her thanks to Lady Jane, meaning Jean Drummond, an influential courtier close to Anne of Denmark.

In 1613, William Seton of Kylesmure (1562-1635), an uncle of her husband, discussed a letter from Jean Drummond, and asked Anne Livingstone to write both to Jean Drummond and Anne of Denmark. William Seton noted that Anne Livingstone had served Princess Elizabeth from her infancy, and later Anne of Denmark. The issue was her husband's right to the Eglinton earldom. He asked Anne Livingstone to ensure that Jean Drummond and the queen inform King James that the queen had known and approved of plans for her marriage, only on the basis that Alexander Seton of Foulstruther would become Earl of Eglinton. In this letter William Seton makes it clear that Anne of Denmark had promoted the marriage of her lady in waiting and the elevation of her husband to the peerage.

Later letters from Jean or Jane Drummond, who became the Countess of Roxburghe, show how Anne Livingstone maintained contact with the court and queen. She offered Drummond gifts of aqua-vitae and linen. Drummond helped her by explaining to the queen why Eglinton had not chosen her as her child's godparent in 1613, and by interceding in "ane matter that tuiches Hir Majesties honour and His Majesties bothe", the gift of the Eglinton earldom to her husband, which was legally complicated. Drummond wrote in March 1613 that King James had not yet made any pronouncement on the question of the Eglinton earldom before going to Newmarket after the wedding of Princess Elizabeth and Frederick V of the Palatinate. Drummond carefully managed Livingstone's reputation with the queen, and wrote a letter during the progress to Bath, describing how she had intercepted a letter Livingstone had sent to the queen via Margaret Murray that might not show her to the best advantage.

A letter from Jean Ruthven at Whitehall describes purchases for Anne Livingstone, who wanted a "resting chair" like Jane Drummond's, a lantern, a piccadill, and lace in the latest fashion.

Anne Livingstone shared news of the court from John Murray of the bedchamber and his wife Elizabeth Schaw. Alexander Seton, 1st Earl of Dunfermline sent the Murrays news of her illness during the birth of her son Alexander and recovery in November 1615. Anne Livingstone addressed her letters to the Murrays jointly to "Dear Brother", and three survive. David Murray of Gorthy brought her a letter from the Murrays in 1616, and told her news about the Scottish favourite the Earl of Somerset and Henry Gibb, who had made trouble for them and angered Anne of Denmark. She replied to the Murrays about:

this fullich falling out of Sumersyds with you, to his oune grit disgrace, which he made him so heated of thoss hear who are bound to you, and knows your trew worth and his fallshoud, that if ther were non but my housband, he wold, if it were exceptable to you and nessicer, undertak to pruv him ane erand lyare in that he wret to you, and message sent with that ungret fullich cousing of yours, Herie Gib.

(modernised) this foolish falling out of Somerset's with you, to his own great disgrace, which he made him so hated of those here who are bound to you, and knows your true worth and his falsehood, that if there were none but my husband, he would, if it were acceptable to you and necessary, undertake to prove him ane errant liar in that he wrote to you, and message sent with that ingrate foolish cousin of yours, Harry Gibb.

Some family historians include an anecdote that Alexander Earl of Eglinton had previously engaged the support of the favourite Somerset to obtain the full benefits of the earldom, and his courage during this interview and mention of his sword was the origin of his nickname "Graysteel".

Anne Livingstone hoped that John Murray would encourage the king to further her family's interests. On 19 August 1617 she presented their son James Murray at his christening in the Chapel Royal at Holyrood Palace.

In Scotland, she lived at Seton Palace, Callendar House, Polnoon Castle and Eglinton Castle. A household account from 1618 reveals that she supervised the production of linen, buying lint in Edinburgh, and played the virginals. Anne gave linen to her sister-in-law, Isabella Seton, dowager Countess of Perth, and exchanged books with her.

Her husband had visited the exiled minister John Welsh in France at Jonzac in 1611 before their marriage; Anne is said to have helped and encouraged her husband to prevent the banishment of David Dickson the minister of Irvine, who then preached at Eglinton Castle for two months in 1622 before he was confined in Turriff despite Eglinton's continued efforts. Robert Wodrow recorded a story told by his father that Anne, her sister Margaret Countess of Wigtown, and the poet Lady Culross (Elizabeth Melville), and other women had welcomed Dickson with enthusiasm at Eglinton Castle. In 1627 Wigtown wrote that she should come to Cumbernauld Castle to hear Robert Bruce of Kinnaird preach, and in 1629 he wrote to her on the subject of Grace and election. John Welsh's son Josias wrote to her describing his parish at Templepatrick.

The kirk minister Robert Bruce of Kinnaird wrote to her in September 1629, writing, "Madam, I cannot tell at what school your ladyship has been at, but surely your ladyship's last letter melled of grace, had a fragrant perfume of the doctrine of the Holy Spirit."

Anne Livingstone died in 1632.

A distant kinsman, the kirk minister John Livingstone, described her character, piety, and regard for truth, "although bred at court".

== Portraits and jewels ==
When Anne Livingstone returned to Scotland in July 1607, Anna of Denmark gave her a pearl and other jewels to hang from a pendant, a gold necklace chain of gold elements set with pearls, rubies and diamonds, "green snakes" and S-shaped pieces, and a gold jewel showing the "Annunciation of our Lady" with diamonds and rubies.

=== The feather ===
Another jewel given to Anne Livingstone in August 1607, supplied by the goldsmith William Gosson, cost the king £400. In August 1614, when the Countess of Livingstone was preparing for the christening of one her children, Isabella Seton, Countess of Perth, wrote to her, saying that she was organising the return of a feather jewel to her. The Countess of Eglinton left a great jewel containing fourteen diamonds and five pendant triangle diamonds to her son Hugh Montgomerie, 7th Earl of Eglinton. Designs for feather jewels or aigrettes at the period are associated with the goldsmith Arnold Lulls.

=== The locket ===
A portrait of a young woman c. 1610 in the private Seafield collection labelled "Lady Livingston" may be her. In the portrait "Lady Livingston" wears a miniature of Anne of Denmark, and this may be a locket and miniature now in the Fitzwilliam Museum which came from the Eglinton collection. The jewelled locket may have been made by George Heriot in 1610, and the miniature in the studio of Nicholas Hilliard. A sketch for the monograms or ciphers ("CAR" and "ASR") corresponding to the jewel survives in Heriot's papers held by the National Records of Scotland.

The Fitzwilliam miniature case has two monograms, one set with diamonds and the other in enamel, with the closed "S", the "s fermé" or "fermesse", a symbol used in correspondence of the period as a mark of affection. The word fermesse was used in French jewellery inventories and the fermesse appears in designs for miniature cases by Étienne Delaune. Anne Livingstone used the closed "S" in her 1616 letter to Elizabeth, Mrs Murray. The "S" may also allude to Anne of Denmark's mother, Sophie of Mecklenburg-Güstrow.

Other women in the entourage of Anne of Denmark had their portraits made including jewelled tablets or lockets with an "A", "AR" or "R" for "Anna Regina", including Margaret Hay, Countess of Dunfermline, and Elizabeth Grey, Countess of Kent.

In her portrait she has a diamond jewel in her hair, possibly the "great jewel containing fourteen great diamonds with five pendant triangle diamonds" which she bequeathed to her son Hugh.

== Family ==
Her children included:

- Hugh Montgomerie (1613-1669), later 7th Earl of Eglinton, who married Anne Hamilton (d. 1632), and secondly Mary Leslie.
- Henry Montgomerie of Giffin (born 1614), named after Prince Henry, Anne of Denmark was his godmother. He married Jean Campbell, a daughter of Archibald Campbell, 7th Earl of Argyll
- Colonel Alexander Montgomerie (born 1615), Anne Livingstone mentions in a letter that she was pregnant and expected a child at Martinmas.
- Colonel James Montgomerie of Coylsfield (d. 1675), who married Margaret MacDonald.
- General Robert Montgomerie, who married Elizabeth Livingstone, and was wounded at the Battle of Marston Moor.
- Margaret Montgomerie, who married John Hay, 1st Earl of Tweeddale, and secondly, William Cunningham, 9th Earl of Glencairn.
- Eleanor Montgomerie.
- Anna Montgomerie.

After her death, a cousin of her husband, Sir John Seton bought fashionable clothes in London for her daughters.
