= Battle of Aberdeen (1646) =

Part of the Wars of the Three Kingdoms

Coordinates: 57°09′N 2°07′W

- Part of the Scottish Civil War
Date	14 May 1646
Location	Aberdeen, Scotland
Result	Royalist victory

Belligerents
(Kingdom of Scotland) Royalists	Covenanters

Commanders and leaders
Marquis of Huntly	Lord Montgomerie

Strength
1,500 foot 500 horse	700 foot 240 horse

Casualties and losses
	Many; 300 captured
- Scotland

The Battle of Aberdeen was fought on 14 May 1646 during the Wars of the Three Kingdoms. George, Marquis of Huntly the commander of a Royalist army, defeated a force of Covenanters under the command of Hugh, Lord Montgomerie.

== Prelude ==
In 1646 Montgomerie was engaged in the northern campaign under John Middleton and on 27 April entered Aberdeen with about 240 horse (cavalry) in four troops. In addition to his horse he had under his command 700 foot in two regiments, and he was entrusted with the duty of holding the city. Huntly, who having suffered some setbacks had retreated to Strathnaver in 1645 had since then returned to his lands around Strathbogie and raised a force of 1,600 foot and 600 horse.

== Battle ==
On 14 May Huntly, with about 1,500 foot and 500 horse, stormed Aberdeen and set it on fire. Montgomerie's defenders repulsed the first two assaults but were then overcome. The Covenanters suffered many casualties and over 300 were taken prisoner, but there were no civilian casualties.

== Aftermath ==
Huntly did not remain in Aberdeen, but with his usual indecision he soon returned to Strathbogie. A council of war declared on 8 June that Montgomerie had conducted himself in the affair "with as much prudence and gallantry as could have been expected".
