= Hugh Montgomerie, 7th Earl of Eglinton =

Scottish landowner and nobleman

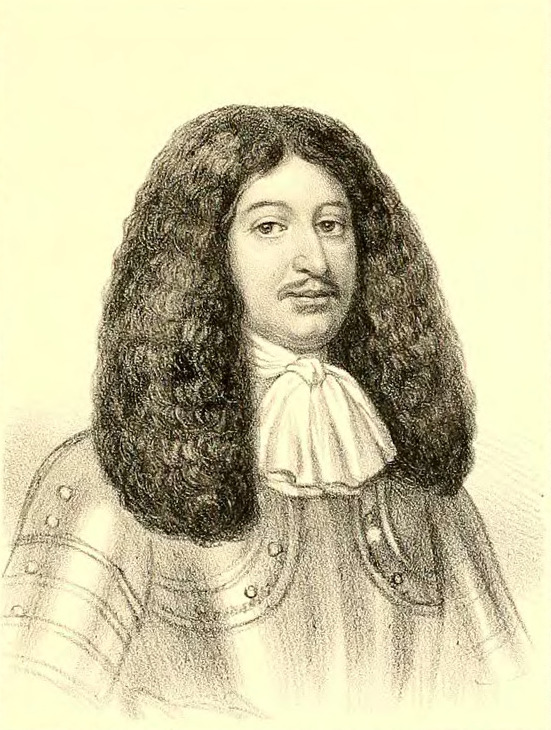

7th Earl of Eglinton
- In office 1661–1669
- Succeeded by: Alexander Montgomerie, 8th Earl Eglinton

Personal details
- Born: 30 May 1613
- Died: February 1669 (aged 55)
- Spouses: Anne Hamilton; Mary Leslie
- Children: 8
- Parent(s): Alexander Montgomerie, 6th Earl of Eglinton and Anne Livingstone
- Education: Glasgow University

Hugh Montgomerie, 7th Earl of Eglinton (30 May 1613 – February 1669) was a Scottish landowner.

== Early life ==
He was the son of Alexander Montgomerie, 6th Earl of Eglinton and Anne Livingstone. He spent much of his childhood at Seton Palace with his grandmother, Margaret, Countess of Winton, widow of Robert Seton, 1st Earl of Winton. He was sent to Glasgow University with his two younger brothers in 1628. In 1633 he went to Paris to continue his education. He went to London in November 1634 and was hosted by David Cunningham of Auchenharvie.

== Career ==
He opposed Charles I's ecclesiastical policy. He was a colonel under Leslie at the Battle of Newburn. He failed to seize Tynemouth in 1640. He was engaged in northern campaign under Middleton in 1646. He was defeated by Huntly at the Battle of Aberdeen (1646), He was disqualified for public service until 1660 for being accessory to the Engagement. He was taken prisoner in 1651 by the English and excepted from Cromwell's Act of Grace in 1654.

Hugh Montgomerie became Earl of Eglinton in January 1661 following the death of his father. He died at Eglinton in February 1669.

== Marriages and children ==
Hugh married in 1631 to Anne Hamilton, daughter of James Hamilton, 2nd Marquess of Hamilton. She died soon after giving birth to a daughter, Anna Montgomerie. An inventory was made of her jewels on 24 October 1632, including a jewelled feather set with diamonds, a gift from her mother Ann Cunningham, Marchioness of Hamilton. Anna Montgomerie married James Ogilvie, 3rd Earl of Findlater.

In 1635 he married Mary Leslie, daughter of John Leslie, 6th Earl of Rothes. Their children included:

- Alexander Montgomerie, 8th Earl Eglinton
- Francis Montgomerie of Giffen
- Mary Montgomerie, who married George Seton, 4th Earl of Winton
- Margaret Montgomerie, who married James Campbell, 2nd Earl of Loudoun and was the mother of Hugh Campbell, 3rd Earl of Loudoun (c. 1675 – 1731).
- Eleanora Montgomerie, who married David Dunbar of Baldoon
- Christian Elphinstone, who married John Elphinstone, 4th Lord Balmerino

== Notes ==
Peerage of Scotland
Preceded by Alexander Montgomerie	Earl of Eglinton; 1661–1669	Succeeded by Alexander Montgomerie
