= Alexander Livingston, 5th Lord Livingston =

British noble (c.1500–1553)

Alexander Livingston, 5th Lord Livingston of Callendar PC (c. 1500–1553) was the guardian of Mary, Queen of Scots, during her childhood.

== Early life ==
Livingston was born c. 1500 in Callendar, Falkirk, Scotland. He was the eldest surviving son of Agnes (née Hepburn) Livingston and William Livingston, 4th Lord Livingston of Callendar, and succeeded his father to the title of Lord Livingston in about 1518. Among his siblings was younger brother William Livingston, Captain of the Royal Castle of Kirkwall, and younger sister, Margaret Livingston, who married John Hay, 4th Lord Hay of Yester.

His paternal grandparents were James Livingston, 3rd Lord Livingston, and Agnes (née Houston) Livingston. His maternal grandparents were Alexander Hepburn of Whitsome (third son of Patrick Hepburn, 1st Lord Hailes) and Janet (née Napier) Hepburn, daughter of Sir Alexander Napier of Merchiston. His maternal uncle was James Hepburn, the Bishop of Moray.

== Career ==
In 1522, Livingston was a commander of the Scottish forces against England. He served as an Extraordinary Lord of Session in 1542, and as one of the eight Lord Keepers of Mary, Queen of Scots in her infancy. Lord Livingston became Joint Custodian of the Queen Mary in about 1543. He was paid £813 for keeping the infant queen in Linlithgow Palace before she moved to Stirling Castle in July 1543, where he was also her keeper. He served as Privy Councillor in 1545.

When Queen Mary went to France in 1548, following her betrothal to the Dauphin, Francis II, Livingston accompanied her, and remained there until he died.

== Personal life ==
His first wife was Janet Stewart, the daughter of Alexander Stewart, 2nd Earl of Buchan. After her death, he married Lady Agnes Douglas, daughter of John Douglas, 2nd Earl of Morton. His children, included:

- John Livingston (d. 1547), Master of Livingstone who was killed in 1547 at the battle of Pinkie, who married Joanna Fleming, daughter of Lady Janet Stewart and Malcolm Fleming, 3rd Lord Fleming.
- William Livingstone, 6th Lord Livingston (d. 1592), who married Agnes Fleming, also a daughter of Lady Janet Stewart and Malcolm Fleming, 3rd Lord Fleming. Their son was Alexander Livingstone, 1st Earl of Linlithgow
- Thomas Livingston of Haining, who married Agnes Crawfurd, first daughter and co-heiress of William Crawfurd of Haining.
- Elizabeth Livingston, who married John Buchanan of Buchanan.
- Janet Livingston (d. 1599), who married Alexander Bruce of Airth, parents of Robert Bruce of Kinnaird.
- Mary Livingston (c. 1541–1579), a lady-in-waiting to Mary, Queen of Scots, who married John Sempill of Beltrees, a son of Robert Sempill, 3rd Lord Sempill in March 1565.
- Magdalen Livingston, also a lady-in-waiting to Queen Mary, who married Arthur Erskine of Blackgrange, the fifth son of John Erskine, 5th Lord Erskine. After his death, she married Sir James Scrimgeour of Dudhope in 1577.
- Helen Livingston, who married James Wetherspune of Brighouse.
- Marion or Marjory Livingston, who married James Ogilvy of Findlater.

After the death of his second wife, he married for a third time to Jeanne de Piédefer, a Maid of Honour to Mary of Guise since 1539. She subsequently married Pierre Joisel, sieur de Betoncourt, a master of the household of Mary of Guise.

Lord Livingston died sometime between 25 July 1549 and 4 January 1551.

== Jeanne de Piédefer, Lady Livingston ==
After Lord Livingston's death, a French captain called de Faucher wrote to his widow, Jeanne, "Madame de Levyston", as his "valentine" from Dumbarton Castle mentioning the arrival of a ship with fine cinnamon. He said he had found a supplier of water-cress and parsley for salads.

Jeanne subsequently married Pierre de Joisel, Seigneur de Saint Rémy-en-Bouzemont et de Betoncourt, squire of the equerry to Mary of Guise and (in 1560) one of five masters of the household to Mary, Queen of Scots. They returned to France in 1559 but returned to Scotland and England to serve Mary, Queen of Scots.

They bought the manor of Saint Rémy-en-Bouzemont in July 1559. Their children, Claude (b. 1560), Jacqueline, Jacques (b. 1562), Pierre and Jeanne de Joisel were born and brought up in France. She came to Mary at Bolton Castle on 8 August 1568 with two women servants and eight male servants.

Peerage of Scotland
Preceded by William Livingston	Lord Livingston c. 1518–1553	Succeeded by William Livingston
