= Falkirk Tunnel =

Canal tunnel in Falkirk, Scotland

Coordinates: 55.9886°N 3.7930°W

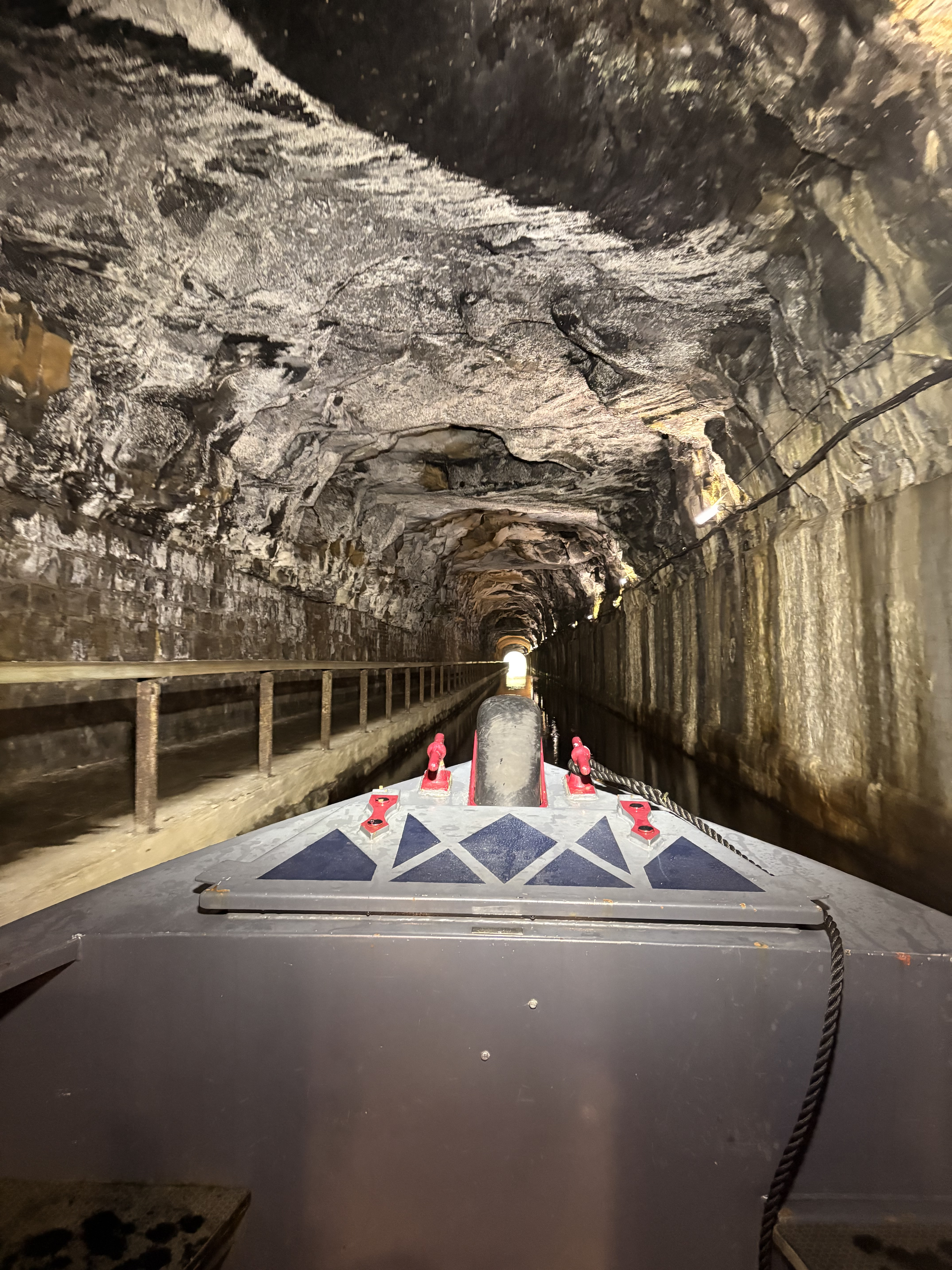
Inside the Falkirk Tunnel from the bow of a canalboat

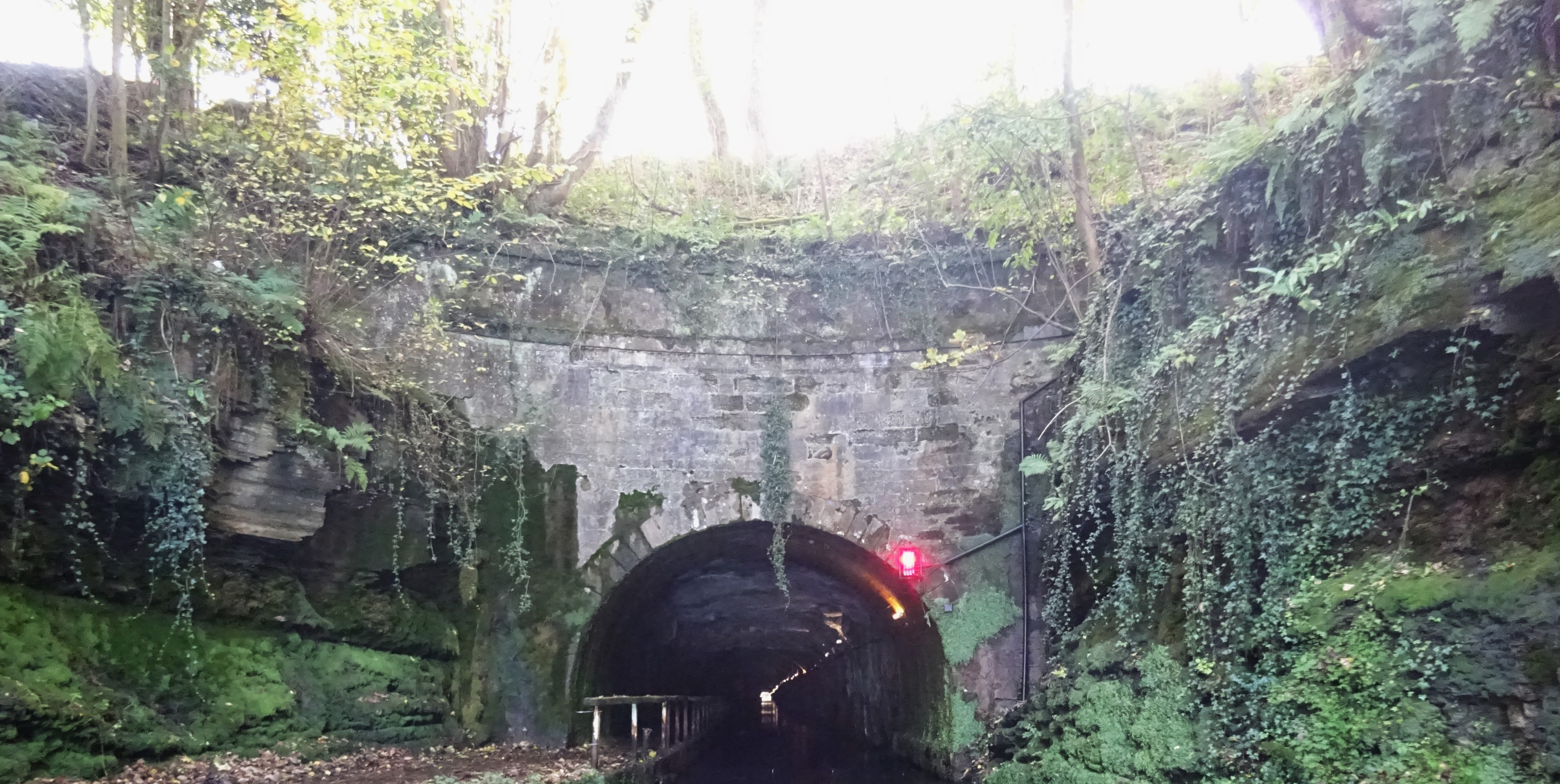
The western end of Falkirk Tunnel

Falkirk Tunnel is a canal tunnel on the Edinburgh and Glasgow Union Canal dug through Prospect Hill in Falkirk, Scotland. Completed in 1822, the tunnel is 630 metres (2,070 ft) long. It was built because the owner of Callendar House had objected to the planned canal spoiling the view from their property.

The murderers Burke and Hare worked on the construction of the tunnel as labourers.
