= Helenor Hay, Countess of Linlithgow =

Scottish courtier and writer (c. 1552–1627)

Helenor Hay, Countess of Linlithgow (c. 1552–1627) was a Scottish courtier and writer.

== Early life ==
Born c. 1552, she was the eldest daughter of Andrew Hay, 8th Earl of Erroll by his first wife, and cousin, Lady Jean Hay, only child of William Hay, 6th Earl of Erroll. her name was often spelled "Helenor" in records, and her daughter Anne once wrote her name "Hellionor", although she herself signed several letters as "Eleanor".

== Career ==
Helenor and her husband were the keepers of Linlithgow Palace and from 1596, Princess Elizabeth, although she was believed by some to be unsuitable as a professed Catholic. The household at Linlithgow for the Princess included Margaret Kennedy, Lady Ochiltree, Alison Hay and her sister Elizabeth Hay. Alison Hay was Princess Elizabeth's nurse. Elizabeth Hay brushed the Princess' hair, for which she was bought hairbrushes and combs. Anne of Denmark was able to visit her daughter at Linlithgow as often as she liked, while she found it less easy to visit her son Prince Henry at Stirling Castle.

The Countess took some religious instruction from Patrick Simson, minister of Stirling, who was also involved in the religious conversion of Marie Stewart, Countess of Mar.

Princess Margaret was also entrusted to her, and on 13 March 1600 James VI of Scotland rewarded the Lord and Lady Livingston for educating both children, a service worth £10,000 for which he renewed and confirmed their lands at Callendar and Falkirk as baronies.

It was rumoured she would be excommunicated by the Church of Scotland in July 1602 unless James VI prevented it. In 1606, the Earl and Helenor, described as "ane obstinat Papist", hosted six imprisoned ministers at Linlithgow including John Welsh, giving them better freedom than they had enjoyed at Blackness Castle. Patrick Simson and other allies were allowed to visit the prisoners.

Around the year 1618, she had to write to the king to avoid excommunication by the church of Scotland.

In 1629, John Wreittoun published a book describing her conversion; The confession and conversion of the right honorable, most illustrious, and elect lady, my Lady C. of L. However, some critics think the Confession was not her work.

== Personal life ==
In 1584, she married Alexander Livingstone, Lord Livingstone and later Earl of Linlithgow. Together, they were the parents of:

- John, Master of Livingston, who died unmarried.
- Alexander Livingston, 2nd Earl of Linlithgow (d. 1648), who married Lady Elizabeth Gordon, second daughter of George Gordon, 1st Marquess of Huntly and Henrietta Stewart (eldest daughter of Esmé Stuart, 1st Duke of Lennox).
- James Livingston, 1st Earl of Callendar (d. c. 1674), who married Margaret Seton, the widow of Alexander Seton, 1st Earl of Dunfermline who was the only daughter of James Hay, 7th Lord Hay of Yester and Lady Margaret Kerr (third daughter of Mark Kerr, 1st Earl of Lothian).
- Anne Livingston (d. 1632), who married to Alexander Montgomerie, 6th Earl of Eglinton.
- Margaret Livingston (d. c. 1651), who married John Fleming, 2nd Earl of Wigtown, son of John Fleming, 1st Earl of Wigtown.

Helenor died in 1627.
