= Cromwell's Act of Grace =

1654 act of the Parliament of England

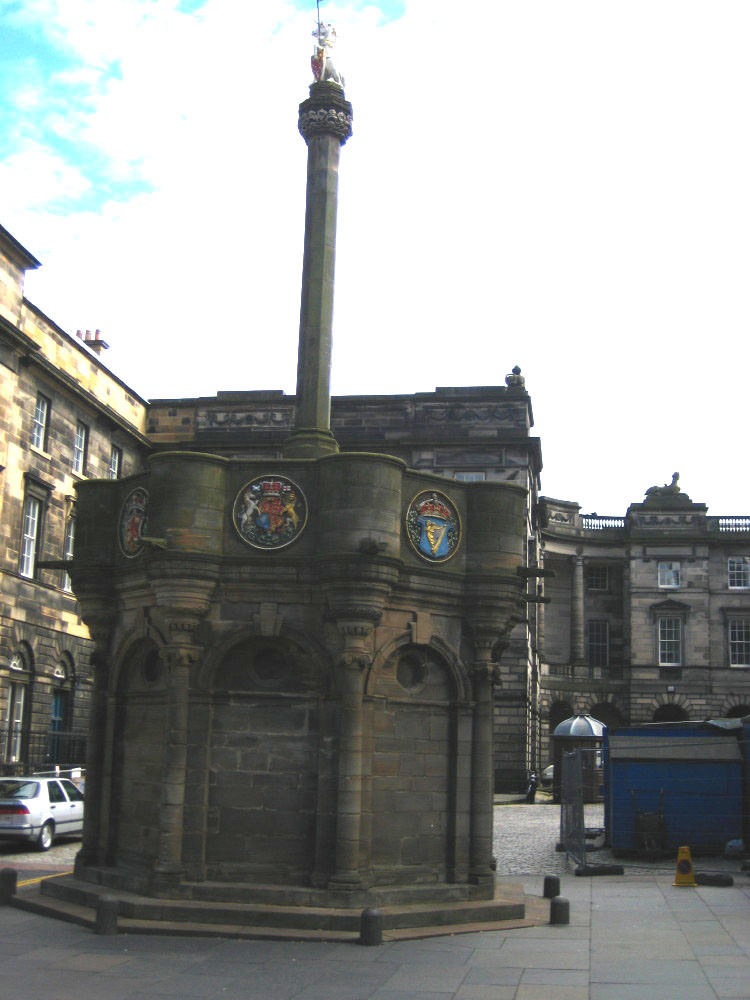
The Act of Pardon and Grace was proclaimed at the Mercat Cross on Edinburgh's Royal Mile.

Cromwell's Act of Grace, or, more formally, the Act of Pardon and Grace to the People of Scotland, was an Act of the Parliament of England that declared that the people of Scotland (with certain exceptions) were pardoned for any crimes they might have committed during the Wars of the Three Kingdoms. It was proclaimed at the Mercat Cross in Edinburgh on 5 May 1654. General George Monck, the English military governor of Scotland, was present in Edinburgh, having arrived the day before for two proclamations also delivered at the Mercat Cross, the first of which declared Oliver Cromwell to be the protector of England, Ireland and Scotland, and that Scotland was united with the Commonwealth of England.

== Origins ==
After the English invasion of 1650, and the defeat of the Scottish armies at the battles of Dunbar, Inverkeithing and Worcester, Scotland was placed under English military occupation with General Monck as military governor of the country. Up to the date of the Act of Grace the English army had been able to suppress the Scottish resistance to the occupation with relative ease and the occupation, with sporadic but ineffective resistance, would continue throughout the Interregnum up until the Restoration in 1660.

The Act had its origins in the English written constitution of December 1653, called the Instrument of Government. Between December 1653 and the calling of the First Protectorate Parliament that sat for the first time in September 1654, the Lord Protector Oliver Cromwell and his Council of State were granted under the Instrument of Government the power "to make laws and ordinances for the peace and welfare of these nations where it shall be necessary" and on 12 April 1654 the regime passed several ordinances about the government of Scotland:

- Ordinance for uniting Scotland into one Commonwealth with England
- Ordinance of Pardon and Grace to the People of Scotland
- Ordinance for erecting Courts Baron in Scotland
- Ordinance for settling the Estates of several excepted Persons in Scotland, in Trustees, to the Uses herein expressed.

== Contents ==
The content of the Act of Grace contained:

- A general pardon and act of oblivion,
- Except for members of the royal family (their estates were confiscated),
- Other excepted who had their estates confiscated,
- Other excepted and fined,
- Other exceptions and provisions.

=== General pardon ===
The first and second paragraphs drew a line under Wars of the Three Kingdoms. Oliver Cromwell, the Lord Protector of the Commonwealth of England, Scotland and Ireland, and the Dominions of those nations, ordained that on 1 May 1654, with the exceptions laid out in paragraphs that followed "in this Ordinance", that the People of Scotland were pardoned for any crimes they might have committed during the preceding wars and that there would be no further financial or other punishments.

The rest of the ordinance proceeded to list the various exceptions to the general pardon and clarification of some of the details.

=== Except members of the royal family ===
The third paragraph excepted royal estates and other possessions in Scotland and so allowed for the sequestration by the Commonwealth. The wording also covered royal possessions that might have been passed to others since 1 May 1642.

=== Except those who had their estates confiscated ===
The fourth paragraph listed twenty-four men whose estates were excepted and forfeited to the Commonwealth (See Appendix A), and like the Royal estates, this was backdated to cover the estates as they were on 18 April 1648. Also, almost as a postscript to the paragraph, a twenty-fifth man, James, 1st Lord Mordington, had his estates of "Maudlain Field, Sunck, Cony-garth, Constables-Batt, Two Watermills, and a Wind-mill lying within Barwick bounds." confiscated.

The next paragraph arranged for the confiscation of the estates of certain categories of Scots who had opposed the English Parliament since 1648 and were still under arms against the English Commonwealth after 3 September 1650, or were not now considered by Oliver Cromwell to be reconciled to the new regime. Those who could be excluded by this paragraph were Scottish MPs who had not signed the Protestation against the invasion of England in 1648, those men who sat in the Scottish Parliament or were a member of the Committee of Estates of Scotland after the coronation of Charles II (in 1651), or were in the Scottish army after the Battle of Dunbar on 3 September 1650 (which included all those who had taken part in the Worcester Campaign).

The following paragraph limited the time creditors had to put in claims against the forfeited estates. Claims had to be lodged with named representatives, within 60 days of the proclamation of the ordinance.

The next three paragraphs granted certain lands to the named wives and children of those whose estates had been confiscated, under the condition that they pay rent to the Protector for those lands and that they renounced any claims they had to other properties which previously belonged to those excluded from the general pardon.

=== Except those who were fined ===
Seventy-three men were fined (see Appendix B). The ordinance included details of how the fines were to be paid and what was to happen if the fine was not paid. The money was to be paid to Gilbert [George] Bilton, deputy treasurer at Leith. Half was to be paid on, or by, 2 August 1654 and the other half on, or by, 2 December 1654. If a person defaulted on payment, then their estate was to be confiscated by the commissioners for sequestration.

=== Other exceptions and provisions ===
The last few paragraphs of the Ordinance laid on certain points so that it was clear that this Ordinance could not be used to frustrate some other points of law that the drafters of the ordinance saw as potential legal problems.

The Ordinance could not be read as restoring or reviving of any lordship, dominion, jurisdiction, tenure, superiority, or any thing whatsoever, abolished by An Ordinance for Uniting Scotland into one Commonwealth with England.

The general pardon did not extend to those persons in arms since 1 May 1652 who would remain subject to the Articles of War. The general pardon could not be construed to extend, to the freeing or discharging of any prisoners or prisoners of war, from their respective imprisonments or their promises and surety for release from that imprisonment.

The final paragraph negated any reading of the ordinance that might be construed to reduce the revenues that formerly went to the Crown and should now go to the Lord Protector.

== Passed by Parliament and consented to by the Lord Protector ==
Although the ordinance had been issued on 12 April 1654, and then proclaimed in Scotland on 5 May 1654, like the other ordinances pertaining to Scotland issued on 12 April 1654, it did not become enacted until an enabling act, called "Act touching several Acts and Ordinances made since the twentieth of April, 1653, and before the third of September, 1654, and other Acts" was consented to by the Lord Protector on the 26 June 1657, the same day that the enabling bill was approved by the Second Protectorate Parliament.

== Appendix A: List of those whose estates were sequestrated ==
The following list of prominent opponents of the Commonwealth were exempted from the general pardon and had their estates forfeited:

Pos	Name	Note
1	James Hamilton, 1st Duke of Hamilton	deceased
2	William Hamilton, 2nd Duke of Hamilton	deceased
3	John, Earl of Crawford-Lindsay	
4	James Livingston, 1st Earl of Callendar	
5	William Keith, 7th Earl Marischal	
6	Alexander Erskine, 3rd Earl of Kellie	
7	John Maitland, 2nd Earl of Lauderdale	
8	John Campbell, 1st Earl of Loudoun	
9	Kenneth Mackenzie, 3rd Earl of Seaforth	
10	John Murray, 2nd Earl of Atholl	
11	Robert Gordon, Viscount of Kenmure	
12	Archibald, Lord Lorne	Eldest son of Archibald, 1st Marquess of Argyll
13	James, Lord Machlin	Eldest son of John, 1st Earl of Loudoun
14	Hugh, Lord Montgomery	Eldest son of Alexander, 6th Earl of Eglinton
15	George, Lord Spynie	
16	William Cranstoun, 3rd Lord Cranstoun	
17	John, 9th Lord Sinclair	
18	Thomas Dalyell	Late Major General of the Foot in the Scottish Army,
19	John Middleton	Late Lieutenant-General of the Horse in the Scottish Army,
20	James, Viscount Newburgh	
21	John Lord Bargany	
22	Sir Thomas Thomson	
23	James Edmeston Lord of Womat	
24	Archibald Napier, 2nd Lord Napier	
25	William Cunningham, 9th Earl of Glencairn	

== Appendix B: List of those fined ==
The following people were fined:

Pos	Name	Amount	Notes
01	David Leslie, Lord Newark	£4,000	Late Lieutenant-General of the Scottish Army
02	William Douglas, 1st Marquis of Douglas	£1,000	
03	Archibald, Lord Angus	£1,000	Eldest son to the Marquess of Douglas
04	William Douglas, Earl of Selkirk	£1,000	Third son of the Marquess of Douglas
05	The heirs of Francis Scott, 2nd Earl of Buccleuch deceased	£15,000	
06	James Stewart, 2nd Earl of Galloway	£4,000	
07	William Ker, 2nd Earl of Roxburghe	£6,000	
08	William Cochrane Lord Cochrane	£5,000	
09	James, 2nd Lord Forrester	£2,500	
10	Philip Anstruther.	1,000 marks sterling	Son of Sir Robert Anstruther
11	Sir Archibald Sterling of Carden.	£1,500	
12	James Drumond of Mackensey	£500	Laird Machane
13	Henry Maule	£2,500	Son to the Earl of Panmure
14	Sir James Livingstone of Kilsyth	£1,500	
15	William Murrey of Polemaise	£1,500	
16	James Erskine, 7th Earl of Buchan	£1,000	
17	John Scrymgeour, Viscount Dudope	£1,500	
18	Preston of Cragmillar	£1,500	Laird of Craigmillar
19	Sir Andrew Flesher of Inner Pether	£5,000	
20	Sir John Wauchab of Nethery	£2000	
21	Earl of Perth, and Lord Drumond his eldest son	£5,000	
22	Earl of Winton	£2,000	
23	Earl of Findlater	£1,500	
24	Alexander Stewart, 5th Earl of Moray	£3,500	
25	James Douglas, 2nd Earl of Queensberry.	£4,000	
26	John Earl of Eithy	£6,000	
27	Lord Duffus	£1,500	
28	Lord Grey	£1,500	
29	Sir Henry Nisbett	£1,000	
30	Patrick Maule, 1st Earl of Panmure	£10,000	
31	Laird of Lundee	£1,000	
32	Earl of Arroll	£2,000	
33	Earl of Tullibardine	£1,500	
34	Earl of Sowthes	£3,000	
35	Earl of Dalhousie	£1,500	
36	Earl of Hartfeild	£2,000	
37	William Lord Rosse	£3,000	
38	Lord Sample	£1,000	
39	Lord Elphinston	£1,000	
40	James, 9th Lord Boyd	£1,500	
41	James Lord Cooper	£3,000	
42	Lord Balvaird	£1,500	
43	Lord Rollock	£1,000	
44	Earl of Kinghorne	£1,000	
45	Earl of Kinkardine	£1,000	
46	Lord Bamfe	£1,000	
47	Master Robert Meldrum of Tillybody	£1,000	
48	Sir Robert Graham of Morphie	£1,000	
49	Sir William Scot of Harden	£3,000	
50	Hay of Nachton	£1,000	
51	Renton of Lamberton	£1,000	
52	Colquhoun of Luz	£2,000	Laird of Lus
53	Hamilton of Preston	£1,000	
54	Mr. Francis Hay of Bowsey	£2,000	
55	Arnot of Ferney	£2,000	
56	Sir Robert Forquhar	£1,000	
57	Sir Francis Reven	£3,000	
58	James Scot of Montross	£3,000	Merchant in Montros
59	Laird of Rothemegordon	£500	Laird Rothemay, Gordoun
60	Colerney, the younger	£1,000	
61	Sir John Scot, of Scots-Torbut	£1,500	Scottistarbet
62	Laird of Gosfrid	£1,000	
63	Laird of Bachilton	£1,500	
64	James Mercer of Aldey	£1,000	
65	Earl of Rothes	£1,000	
66	Lieutenant Colonel Elliot of Stebbs	£1,000	
67	Sir Lewis Stuart	£1,000	Advocate
68	Patrick Scot of Thirleston	£2,000	Patrik Scott of Thirlestane'
69	Sir James Carmighill	£2,000	Lord Carmichael
70	Sir Patrick Cockborne of Clarkington	£2,000	
71	Sir George Morison of Prestongrange	£2,000	
72	Murrey, Laird of Stanhop	£2,000	Son to Sir David Murrey deceased

== See also ==
- List of ordinances and acts of the Parliament of England, 1642–1660
