= Cumbernauld Bond =

Cumbernauld Bond was a pledge between eighteen Scottish noblemen who met at Cumbernauld in August 1640 to defend Scotland against extreme Presbyterians and to defend the National Covenant for the public good against those who used it predominantly for private gain. At political level it was an agreement to oppose the policies of Earl of Argyll who controlled the dominant political faction in Scotland. The most prominent pledger was the Earl of Montrose, others included Lord Fleming, the Earl of Marischal, and Lord Almond.

== Reaction by Argyll and the Covenanters ==
The Earl of Argyll learnt of the Bond's existence from Lord Almond and on 13 April 1641 it was discussed by the Scottish Committee of Estates. Although many members of the Committee were eager to press treason charges against the pledgers, after Montrose and others appeared before them and testified to the bond's existence and tried to justify it, no action, beyond having the bond burnt on a written statement extracted from the pledgers that no evil had been intended, was taken. Lord Almond, who had been appointed lieutenant-general of the Scottish army before the Committee's meeting, retained his position as the Covenanters did not want to emphasize division in their ranks.

== Anti-Presbyterian signatories supporting the Covenanters in the Scottish Civil War ==
Although the Bond is often seen as a sign of the growing division between Argyll and Montrose, some of the signatories did go on to back the Covenanter side in the Scottish Civil War.
