= Callendar House =

Historic house and park in Falkirk, Scotland

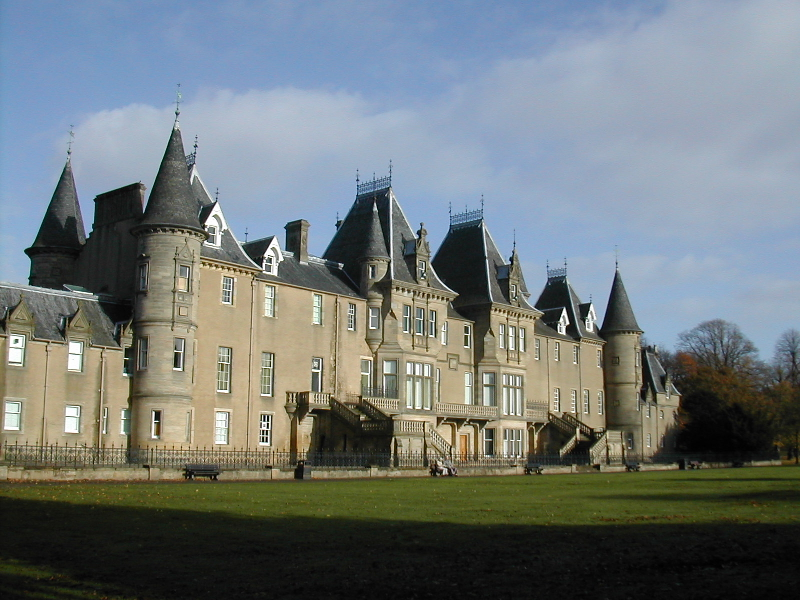
- The south façade of Callendar House

- Callendar House within Falkirk council area
- 55.99464°N 3.76711°W
- Location: Callendar Road, Falkirk FK1 1YR, Scotland, United Kingdom

History
- Founded: 14th century
- Built: 1877
- Built for: Forbes family

Site notes
- Architect(s): Brown and Wardrop
- Architectural style: French Renaissance Revival Châteauesque

Listed Building – Category A
- Official name: Callendar Park, Callendar House
- Designated: 21 March 1960
- Reference no.: LB31236

Inventory of Gardens and Designed Landscapes in Scotland
- Official name: Callendar Park
- Criteria: Architectural; Archaeological
- Designated: 31 March 2007
- Reference no.: GDL00078

Callendar House is a mansion set within the grounds of Callendar Park in Falkirk, central Scotland. During the 19th century, it was redesigned and extended in the style of a French Renaissance château fused with elements of Scottish baronial architecture. However, the core of the building is a 14th-century tower house.

During its 600-year history, Callendar House has played host to many prominent historical figures, including Mary, Queen of Scots, Oliver Cromwell, Bonnie Prince Charlie and Queen Victoria. The current building is by far the most substantial historical building in the area, with a 300 ft (91 m) frontage. It is protected as a category A listed building, and the grounds are included in the Inventory of Gardens and Designed Landscapes in Scotland, the national listing of significant gardens.

== History ==
The house lies on the line of the 2nd-century Antonine Wall, built by the Romans from the Firth of Clyde to the Firth of Forth. In the 12th century Thanes Hall or Thane House, located to the east of the present house, was one of the seats of the Callander family who were Thanes of Callander. In the fourteenth century the 5th Thane Sir Patrick Callander, supported the claim of Edward Balliol to the throne of Scotland. Sir Patrick Callander was later attainted and his estates were forfeited.

=== Livingston family ===
In 1345, the Callendar lands were granted by King David II to Sir William Livingston, who was married to Christian Callander, daughter of Sir Patrick. Sir William Livingston had fought with David II at the Battle of Durham in 1346. The Livingston family became prominent in Scottish affairs over the following centuries. Sir Alexander Livingston was Regent of Scotland during the minority of James II in the 1440s. Alexander, 5th Lord Livingston (c. 1500–1553) was guardian of Mary, Queen of Scots, during her childhood. The marriage agreement between Mary and the French Dauphin was signed at Callendar House. Lord Livingston's daughter Mary was maid of honour to Queen Mary. Mary and Darnley came to Callendar during the Chaseabout Raid, soaked by a rainstorm on 31 August 1565.

Alexander Livingston, 1st Earl of Linlithgow (d. 1621) and his wife Lady Eleanor, daughter of Andrew Hay, 8th Earl of Erroll, were entrusted by King James VI & I with the upbringing and education of his daughter Princess Elizabeth.

Members of the Livingston family were raised to the peerage as Earl of Linlithgow (1600), Earl of Callendar (1641), and Earl of Newburgh (1660). They played an important part in the history of the area, but their hold on the lands came to an abrupt end in the 18th century when James Livingston, 5th Earl of Linlithgow and 4th Earl of Callander, was forced into exile abroad because he had sided with the "Old Pretender", son of King James II of England (James VII of Scotland) in the Jacobite rising of 1715. The Callendar estates were forfeited and purchased by the York Buildings Company, who leased the house back to the earl's daughter, Lady Anne Livingston, from 1724.

On 14 September 1725, Bonnie Prince Charlie stayed at the house where he persuaded Lady Anne and her husband William Boyd, 4th Earl of Kilmarnock to join him. Lady Anne gave hospitality again to Charles Stuart before the Battle of Falkirk in 1746, but, after his defeat at Culloden, Lady Anne's husband, the Earl of Kilmarnock, was beheaded for treason. After Lady Anne's death in 1747, her son James Hay, 15th Earl of Erroll (1726–1778), remained at Callendar House until his death.

=== Forbes family ===
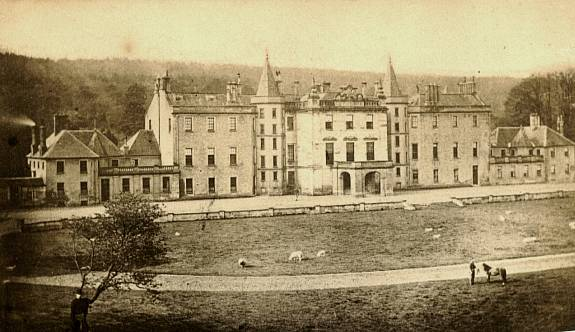
The house in William Forbes' time

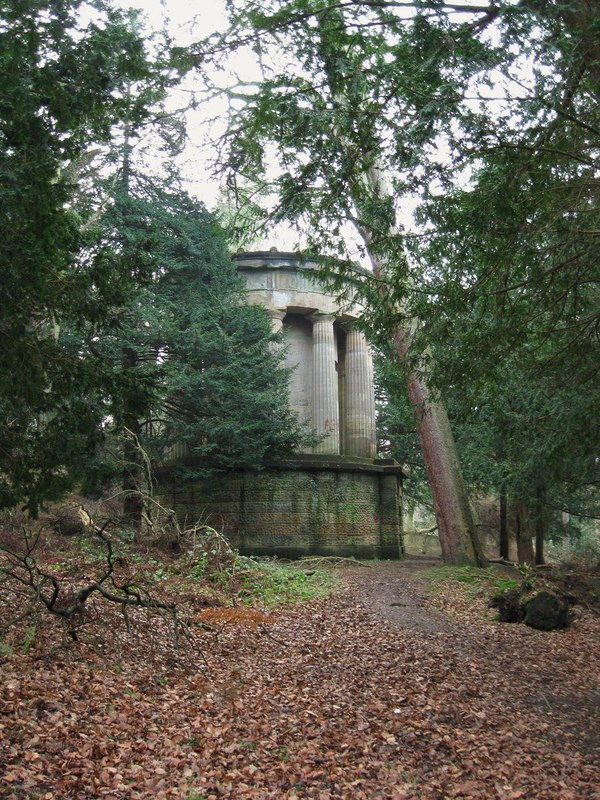
Forbes Mausoleum

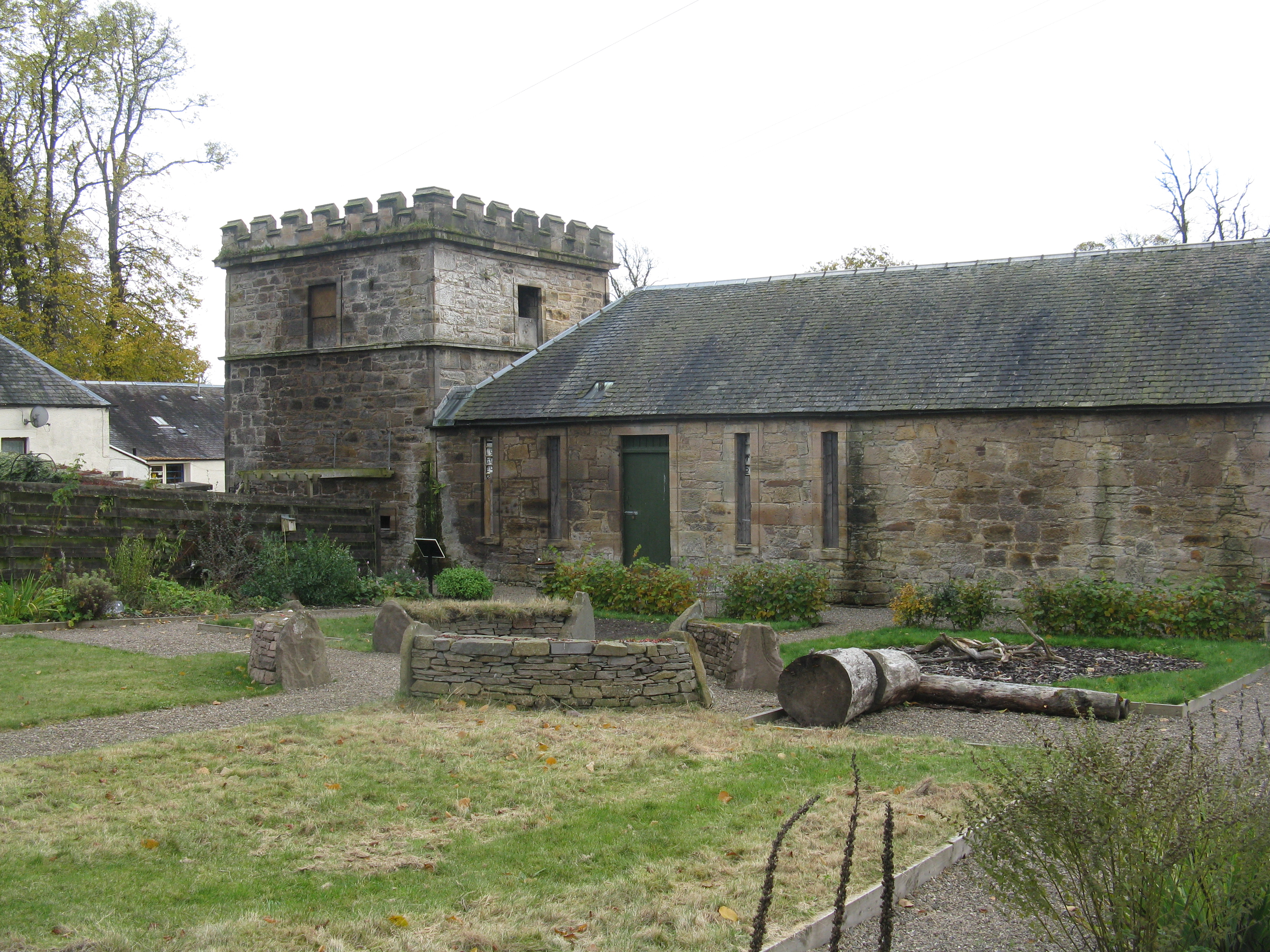
Doocot and kennels at Callendar House

In 1783, the estate went to auction after the York Buildings Company was forced to sell its assets. Lord Errol bid for the estate, but was outbid by an Aberdeen coppersmith William Forbes (1756–1823), a businessman who specialised in contracts to supply the Royal Navy. William Forbes bought the house and estate for £100,000, though it was rumoured at the time that the timber alone on the estate was worth double that. Forbes made significant alterations to the house, and his son and grandson further altered the building by adding French-château-style roofs. James Craig prepared drawings in 1785, though it is not certain these were carried out. In 1827 a scheme of internal alterations was undertaken, to designs by David Hamilton. Forbes' descendants kept the house for almost 200 years, after which it fell into disrepair.

When construction of the Union Canal was proposed, William Forbes objected to it passing through his estate, in view of Callendar House. This necessitated building the Falkirk Tunnel, a 696 yd (636 m) tunnel through Prospect Hill to the west. The tunnel is still in use today as part of the Union Canal, but is now equipped with lights and a safety barrier for walkers.

The dovecote, which cost £84, was built in the 1850s; the kennels below were heated.

=== 20th century ===
In 1963, Callendar House was purchased along with some of the parkland by Falkirk Burgh Council. Since 2011 Callendar House has been administered through Falkirk Community Trust. The majority of the estate is still owned by the family company Callendar Estate, which remains the largest landowner in Falkirk. A late-1960s local authority housing development occupies the north-west portion of the estate, including eleven 15-storey tower blocks spread over four clusters, the closest at Seaton Place only 200 yards from Callendar House itself.

== 21st century ==
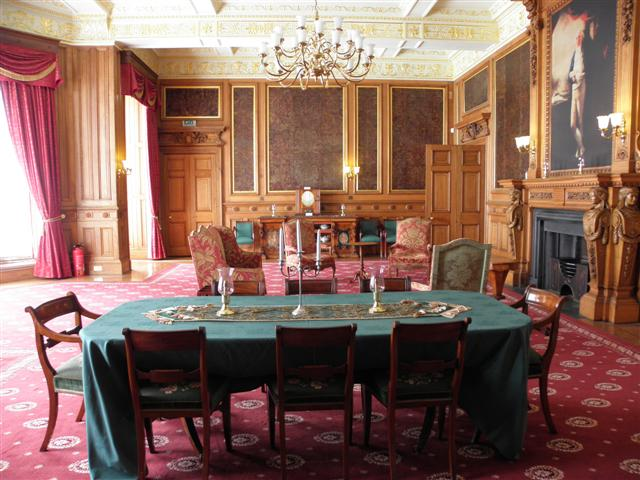
Morning Room

In July 2011, Falkirk Community Trust assumed responsibility for the management and operation of Callendar House.

Callendar House was voted Favourite Visitor Attraction by Forth2. Around 28,000 visitors came to Callendar House in 2006, up over 50% on the previous year. This may be in connection with the recent local attraction, The Falkirk Wheel, whose visitor numbers doubled during the same period.

=== Museum ===
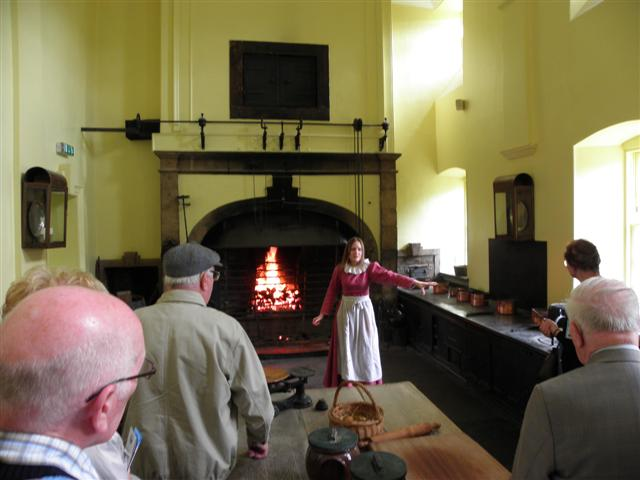
The Kitchen

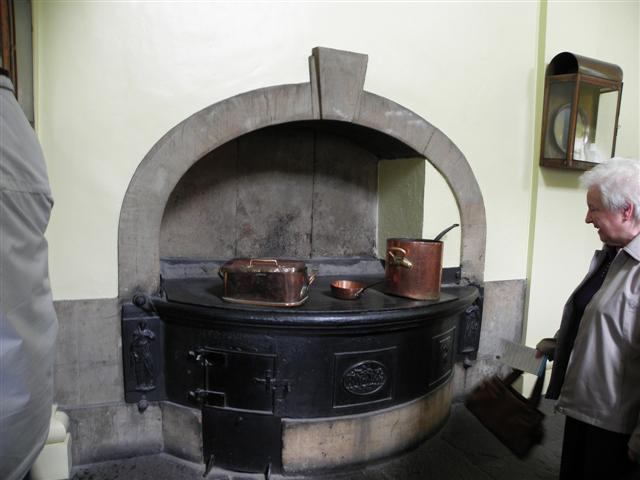
Bread oven

Callendar House is being developed as a major heritage centre. The house interiors have since been restored to their former Georgian style glory. It is the principal museum in Falkirk district, as an art, history, and historic house museum.

It has two reception rooms, the Pink Room (the Drawing Room) and the Green Room (the Morning Room), as well as a fully working Georgian period kitchen, dominated by a large open fire. Staff in period costumes are tasked with informing guests of the history of the house and preparing food that was served at social occasions that once took place there.

Permanent exhibitions include "William Forbes' Falkirk" and "The Antonine Wall". The other galleries show around seven different exhibitions a year from all around the world.

There is also a history research centre, where all of Falkirk's historical archives are kept, housed in the Victorian oak-panelled library.

=== Park ===
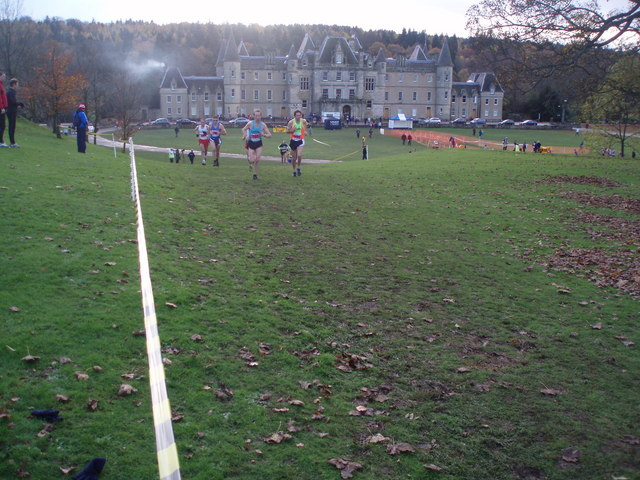
The Antonine Wall passes through the park

The grounds of the house contain a pitch and putt course, crazy golf, a children's adventure playground, a boating lake and the Antonine Wall. There is also a contemporary art gallery, the Park Gallery, which has been relocated into Callendar House itself. Callendar Estate extends to 500 acres (2.0 km^{2}) and is open for walks through the woodland and also home to the Forbes family mausoleum, a large domed circular Grecian-Doric building which contains the remains of many of the Forbeses. The mausoleum has fallen into disrepair and is heavily vandalised with graffiti and damage to the brickwork.

Various events are held in the grounds throughout the year, including the annual firework display, which is regularly attended by over 70,000 people, as well as the national street arts festival, Big in Falkirk, the largest round of the Scottish Cyclocross Series and the Scottish National Cross Country Championships. Behind the house lies Callander Wood, which contains a number of pre-determined paths popular with ramblers and dog walkers.

== See also ==
- List of places in Falkirk council area
- Inventory of Gardens and Designed Landscapes in Scotland
