= Alexander Montgomerie, 6th Earl of Eglinton =

Scottish aristocrat and soldier (1588–1661)

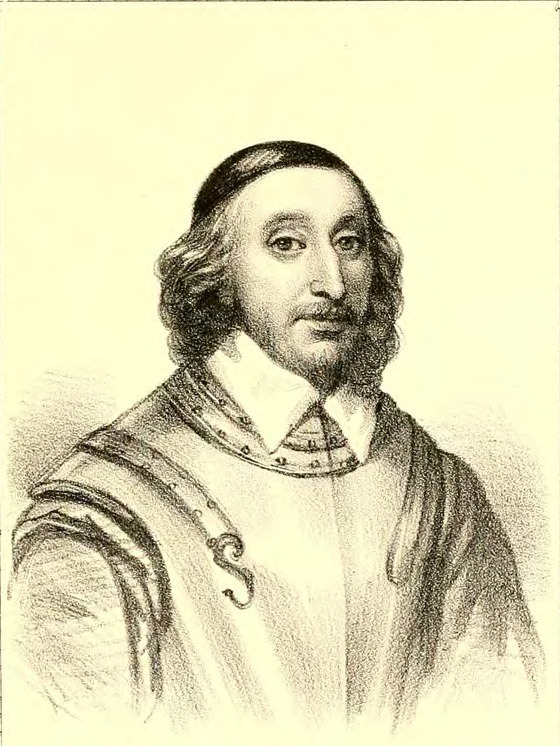

6th Earl of Eglinton
- In office 1612–1661
- Succeeded by: Hugh Montgomerie, 7th Earl of Eglinton

Personal details
- Born: 1588
- Died: 7 January 1661 (aged 72–73)
- Spouses: Anne Livingstone; Margaret Scott
- Children: 8
- Parents: Robert Seton, 1st Earl of Winton; Margaret Montgomerie

Military service
- Commands: Scottish regiment of horse
- Battles/wars: Battle of Marston Moor

Alexander Montgomerie, 6th Earl of Eglinton (1588 – 7 January 1661) was a Scottish aristocrat and soldier, originally known as Sir Alexander Seton of Foulstruther.

== Life ==
He was the third son of Robert Seton, 1st Earl of Winton by his wife Lady Margaret Montgomerie, daughter of Hugh Montgomerie, 3rd Earl of Eglinton.

In July 1606 he was involved in an incident at Perth, during Parliament. In the evening he went with his older brother, the Master of Winton, to the lodging of the Earl of Eglinton with nine or ten companions. On the way they met the Earl of Glencairn who had thirty followers coming the other way. The Master of Winton and the Earl passed each other, but the servants at the rear of the two companies started to fight, only because of a long-standing feud between the Eglinton and Glencairn families. The town and royal guard stopped the fighting. There were few injuries, except to John Mathie, a servant of Glencairn.

In 1612, after spending some time in Paris, and visiting the exiled minister John Welsh of Ayr, he succeeded his childless cousin Hugh Montgomerie, 5th Earl of Eglinton, as Earl of Eglinton. The 5th Earl had settled the earldom and entail on Seton, provided he took the name and arms of Montgomerie. This was confirmed by King James VI in 1615. Montgomerie's uncle Alexander Seton called the three-year struggle for his nephew's earldom "this over langsome and fashious besines of Eglintoun".

Alexander's wife Anne Livingstone had engaged the services of her powerful friend Jean Drummond to persuade Anne of Denmark to intercede with King James on their behalf for the earldom. They also canvassed the support of the King's favourite, the Earl of Somerset, which supposedly led to Eglinton being known as "Greysteel". A letter of Anne Livingstone's mentions their subsequent disagreement with Somerset.

Montgomerie petitioned against the imposition of Common Prayer Book in Scotland and assisted in the preparations of the National Covenant. He was a Privy Councillor of Scotland in 1641.

Montgomerie, who was commonly known as "Greysteel", commanded a Scottish regiment of horse (cavalry) for the English Parliament and distinguished himself at the Battle of Marston Moor (1644). On the execution of Charles I in 1649 he supported the recall of Charles II and the policy of the Marquess of Argyll. In 1651 he was betrayed to Oliver Cromwell and detained in Edinburgh Castle, but afterwards allowed the liberty of Berwick. His estates sequestered for two years, and he was included in Cromwell's Act of Grace.

== Family ==
In 1612 Alexander married Anne Livingstone, daughter of Alexander Livingstone, 1st Earl of Linlithgow and Helenor Hay, she had been a lady in waiting to Princess Elizabeth and Anne of Denmark. Their children included:

- Hugh Montgomerie (1613-1669), later 7th Earl of Eglinton, who married Anne Hamilton (d. 1632), and secondly Mary Leslie.
- Henry Montgomerie of Giffen, who married as the second husband of Jane Campbell, Viscountess Kenmure. He died in 1644 and she gained a pension for life.
- Colonel Alexander Montgomerie (b. 1615).
- Colonel James Montgomerie of Coylsfield (d. 1675), who married Margaret MacDonald.
- General Robert Montgomerie, who married Elizabeth Livingstone, and was wounded at the Battle of Marston Moor.
- Margaret Montgomerie, who married John Hay, 1st Earl of Tweeddale, and secondly, William Cunningham, 9th Earl of Glencairn.
- Eleanor Montgomerie.
- Anna Montgomerie.

He married, secondly, Margaret Scott, daughter of Walter Scott, 1st Lord Scott of Buccleuch. In May 1650 she sent him a letter discussing the sacking of a female servant and wrote "God Almighty send a good trial of all the witches, and send them a hot fire to burn them with".

Peerage of Scotland
Preceded by Hugh Montgomerie	Earl of Eglinton; 1612–1669	Succeeded by Hugh Montgomerie
