= Alexander Livingstone, 1st Earl of Linlithgow =

Scottish nobleman and politician (died 1621)

The Right Honourable The Earl of Linlithgow PC

Personal details
- Born: Alexander Livingston
- Died: 24 December 1621 Callendar House, Falkirk, Scotland
- Spouse: Lady Helen Hay (m. 1583)
- Children: Alexander Livingston, 2nd Earl of Linlithgow; James Livingston, 1st Earl of Callendar; Anne Livingstone
- Parent(s): William Livingstone, 6th Lord Livingston; Agnes Fleming

Alexander Livingston, 1st Earl of Linlithgow PC (died 24 December 1621) was a Scottish nobleman, courtier, and politician. His wife was Helenor Hay, Countess of Linlithgow who was a royal tutor.

== Early life ==
He was the eldest son of William Livingstone, 6th Lord Livingston, by his wife Agnes, second daughter of Malcolm Fleming, 3rd Lord Fleming. Among his siblings were Jean Livingston, who married Alexander Elphinstone, 4th Lord Elphinstone, the Treasurer of Scotland, and Margaret Livingston, who married Lewis Bellenden and Patrick Stewart, 2nd Earl of Orkney.

He supported the faction of Mary, Queen of Scots and at the capture of Dumbarton Castle on 2 May 1571, he was taken prisoner, but appears to have been freed soon afterwards.

== Career ==
On his father making submission to the Regent Morton on 22 May 1574, Livingstone was relieved of bonds, which he had entered into for the deliverance of Callendar House. In September 1579 he accompanied James VI of Scotland from Stirling to Edinburgh, on the occasion of his royal entry, and on 24 September 1580 he was appointed a Gentleman of the King's Bedchamber.

Livingstone was a member of the assize for the trial of Morton in 1581; and he remained a loyal supporter of Esmé Stewart, 1st Duke of Lennox. When the Duke had to depart from Edinburgh on 5 September 1582, Livingstone accompanied him westwards to Glasgow, and he was also connected with the conspiracy of the Duke on 30 November to seize Edinburgh. When the Duke left for France on 20 December following, Livingstone accompanied him, but after the Duke's death on 26 May 1583 he returned to Scotland. For his prompt action in taking possession of Stirling Castle on 22 April 1584, after it had been vacated by the Ruthven raiders, he was declared to have done good service.

=== Lord Livingstone ===
Alexander Livingstone succeeded his father as Lord Livingstone in 1592. Although he may well have been concerned in negotiations with Spain, he was on 31 October 1593 appointed a member of the commission for the trial of the Earls of Angus, Huntly, and Erroll for the same treasonable conduct, in the Spanish blanks plot; and he signed the act of abolition in their favour on 26 November. On 18 January 1594 he was named a commissioner of taxation, and in May 1594 he was chosen a lord of the articles.

At the baptism of Prince Henry on 23 August 1594, Livingstone carried the towel. In November 1596 the care of Princess Elizabeth was entrusted to him and his wife Helen Livingstone, Countess of Linlithgow, which caused continuing controversy because she was a Roman Catholic. He was chosen one of the members of the Scottish privy council, on its reconstitution in December 1598. In March 1600 he had a charter of novo damus of the barony of Callendar, in which the town of Falkirk was erected into a free burgh of barony.

=== Earl of Linlithgow ===
On 25 December 1600 Livingstone was, on the occasion of the baptism of Prince Charles, created Earl of Linlithgow, Lord Livingstone and Callendar. He and Lady Livingstone remained guardians of the Princess Elizabeth until the departure of Anne of Denmark to London in June 1603, and after the princess was restored to the king at Windsor an act was passed discharging them of their duty.

=== Union of the Crowns ===
After the Union of the Crowns, Anne of Denmark summoned a meeting on 4 May 1603 with the Earl of Linlithgow (who looked after Princess Elizabeth), Adam Newton (the tutor of Prince Henry), and Alexander Wilson, a tailor who made clothes for the royal children. They made an inventory or schedule of what clothes needed to be made in the next ten days before their journey to England.

Livingstone was criticised at this time for his involvement in the controversy at Stirling Castle in May 1603. Anne of Denmark attempted to get custody of Prince Henry. She was resisted by Marie Stewart, Countess of Mar and the Master of Mar. Livingstone signed a bond with other noblemen supporting the delivery of the Prince to the Queen, an action which greatly displeased King James.

In July 1604 the Earl was appointed one of the commissioners for a union with England. In 1621 he voted, through his procurator, against the Five Articles of Perth.

== Personal life ==
On 26 January 1583, he was married to Lady Helen Hay (c. 1552–1627). She was the eldest daughter of Andrew Hay, 8th Earl of Erroll and his first wife (and cousin), Lady Jean Hay (only child of William Hay, 6th Earl of Erroll). Together, they had three sons and two daughters:

- John, Master of Livingston, who died unmarried.
- Alexander Livingston, 2nd Earl of Linlithgow (d. 1648), who married Lady Elizabeth Gordon, second daughter of George Gordon, 1st Marquess of Huntly and Lady Henrietta Stuart (eldest daughter of Esmé Stuart, 1st Duke of Lennox).
- James Livingston, 1st Earl of Callendar (d. c. 1674), who married Hon. Margaret Seton, the widow of Alexander Seton, 1st Earl of Dunfermline who was the only daughter of James Hay, 7th Lord Hay of Yester and Lady Margaret Kerr (third daughter of Mark Kerr, 1st Earl of Lothian).
- Anne Livingston (d. 1632), who married to Alexander Montgomerie, 6th Earl of Eglinton.
- Margaret Livingston (d. c. 1651), who married John Fleming, 2nd Earl of Wigtown.

Linlithgow died on 24 December 1621 at Callendar House, and was succeeded in his titles by his eldest surviving son.

== Notes ==
Attribution

This article incorporates text from a publication now in the public domain: Lee, Sidney, ed. (1893). "Livingstone, Alexander (d.1622)". Dictionary of National Biography. Vol. 33. London: Smith, Elder & Co.

Peerage of Scotland
New creation	Earl of Linlithgow; 1600–1621	Succeeded by Alexander Livingston
Preceded by William Livingston	Lord Livingston; 1592–1621	Succeeded by Alexander Livingston
