= William Livingstone, 6th Lord Livingston =

Scottish lord of Parliament

William Livingstone, 6th Lord Livingston, (died 1592), was a Scottish lord of Parliament.

== Early life ==
William Livingstone was the son of Alexander Livingston, 5th Lord Livingston (c. 1500–1553) and his second wife, Lady Agnes Douglas, daughter of John Douglas, 2nd Earl of Morton. His father, Alexander, was the guardian of Mary, Queen of Scots, during her childhood.

== Life ==
William became Lord Livingston in 1550, his elder brother John, Master of Livingstone was killed in 1547 at the battle of Pinkie. He was a Protestant. His sister Mary Livingston was one of the four attendants of Mary, Queen of Scots.

William, Lord Livingston, attended the wedding of Mary, Queen of Scots, and the Earl of Bothwell at Holyrood Palace in May 1567. He fought for Queen Mary at the battle of Langside in 1568.

His wife Agnes Fleming became an attendant of Mary in England. She came to Bolton Castle in August 1568, with two waiting women and eight male servants. She was travelling to Tutbury Castle in January 1569 when she fell ill at Rotherham, and Francis Knollys wrote that Mary "doth esteem (her) most dearly". At Tutbury, the Earl of Shrewsbury wrote that Lady Livingston, Mary Seton, and the queen, worked embroidery with his wife, Bess of Hardwick. Her servants in the household of Mary at Sheffield Castle were Nicol Fisher and her gentlewoman Christian Graham. She was murdered by Mawse Livingstone in 1597.

== Personal life ==
William married Agnes Fleming (1535–1597), a daughter of Lady Janet Stewart (1502–1562) and Malcolm Fleming, 3rd Lord Fleming (c. 1494–1547). Agnes Fleming's sister Janet Fleming had married William's brother, John Master of Livingstone. William's children included;

- Alexander Livingstone, 1st Earl of Linlithgow (died 1621), who married Helenor "Helen" Hay, eldest daughter of Andrew Hay, 8th Earl of Erroll (c. 1531–1585)
- George Livingstone of Ogleface
- William Livingstone of Westquarter, near Linlithgow
- Jean Livingstone, who married Alexander Elphinstone, 4th Lord Elphinstone (1552–1638), the Treasurer of Scotland
- Margaret Livingstone, who married Lewis Bellenden and Patrick Stewart, 2nd Earl of Orkney

Peerage of Scotland
Preceded by Alexander Livingston	Lord Livingston; 1550–1592	Succeeded by Alexander Livingston
