= Gilbert Blackhall =

Gilbert Blackhall or Blakhal (died 1671) was a Scottish Catholic missionary priest. He is now remembered for his autobiographical writings.

== Life ==
Blackhall's background is believed to have been in Aberdeenshire. He spent a period as a soldier of fortune. He entered the Scotch College, Rome in 1626, was ordained priest, and returned to Scotland in 1630. He encountered opposition from Jesuits there, however, and left for Paris, where he became confessor to Lady Isabella Hay, eldest daughter of Francis Hay, 9th Earl of Erroll. Going to Brussels in search of patronage, he had an audience with Isabella Clara Eugenia, right at the end of her life. By persistence he found Lady Isabella a pension, enabling her to return to Scotland. He himself turned down a position, thought to be with the Institute of the Blessed Virgin Mary. But Isabella Clara Eugenia's death in 1633 closed down chances for Scots in Brussels at court. Lady Isabella was in a house of canonesses at Mons, in 1637.

In 1637 Blackhall returned to Scotland, where he did missionary work in Aberdeenshire and Banffshire. He also acted as chaplain to Sophia Hay, Countess of Aboyne at Aboyne Castle; she was the sister of Lady Isabella. The Countess died in 1642, leaving her only child Henrietta Gordon.

Blackhall returned to France in 1643, with the view of inducing the Marchioness of Huntly, Henrietta's grandmother, to bring her to France to be educated. He initially failed in this plan, and applied to Anne of Austria, the Queen of France, to use her influence, ultimately successfully.

Meanwhile, Henrietta had become a Protestant, but was anyway taken to France. Blackhall had a brief period as head of the Scots College, Paris in 1653.

== Works ==
Blackhall wrote his autobiography in Paris in 1653. It contains accounts of his relations with Lady Isabella Hay, with the Countess of Aboyne, and with Henrietta Gordon. The title is A breiffe Narration of the Services done to three noble Ladyes, by Gilbert Blakal, Preist of the Scots Mission in France, in the Low Countries, and in Scotland. Dedicated to Madame de Gourdon, one of the forsaid three, and now Dame d'Attour to Madame. It was edited by John Stuart from the original manuscript in the possession of James Francis Kyle, and printed at Aberdeen for the Spalding Club in 1844.

== See also ==
- Catholic Church in Scotland

== Notes ==
Attribution

This article incorporates text from a publication now in the public domain: Stephen, Leslie, ed. (1886). "Blackhall, Gilbert". Dictionary of National Biography. Vol. 5. London: Smith, Elder & Co.
