= Henrietta Gordon =

Henrietta Gordon (born c. 1628; floruit 1672) was a Scottish-born courtier, a maid of honour to Princess Henrietta, youngest daughter of Charles I of England.

== Early life ==
Henrietta Gordon was the youngest daughter of Lord John Gordon (created Viscount Melgum and Lord Aboyne in 1627) by Sophia Hay, fifth daughter of Francis Hay, 9th Earl of Erroll. Henrietta was born about 1628. Her father was the second son of George Gordon, 1st Marquis of Huntly, by his wife, the former Lady Henrietta Stewart, eldest daughter of the first Duke of Lennox. He burned to death in the fire at Frendraught in October 1630; and, his widow dying on 22 March 1642, Henrietta was left an orphan.

She had been brought up a Roman Catholic, and, her guardian and uncle George Gordon, 2nd Marquis of Huntly, being a Protestant, her mother on her deathbed commended her to the care of her father confessor, Gilbert Blackhall. He went to Paris in the hope of obtaining instructions from Henrietta's grandmother, the Dowager Marquise of Huntly, Henrietta Stewart. The marquise, however, pleading poverty, took no step to have the child brought to Paris, as Blackhall thought she should be; and so he applied to Anne of Austria, and obtained from her a letter, under the joint sign-manual of herself and the king, praying the Marquis of Huntly, who had assumed the guardianship of Henrietta (with the intention of having her educated in the Protestant faith), to permit Blackhall to escort her to France. Blackhall therefore went to Scotland, and, after delays, obtained the charge of Henrietta, and took ship with her from Aberdeen on 26 July 1643.

In Paris, Henrietta was presented to the queen by her second cousin, Ludovic, fifth son of Esmé Stewart, 3rd Duke of Lennox (better known as Monsieur d'Aubigny), and was sent to the convent of the Filles de Ste. Marie, Rue St. Antoine, to learn French. After remaining there a year she was placed under the charge of Madame de Brienne, who found it more convenient to send her to the convent of Charonne, where she objected to the rule and ways of the mother superior, and meagre diet of the convent. Blackhall accordingly induced the queen to have her removed to the convent of St. Nicolas de Lorraine, where she remained from 8 January to 10 August 1647, when she was transferred to that of Fervacques in the Faubourg St. Germain. Here she resided till 20 January 1649, when, the Fronde having raised an insurrection in the streets of Paris, she was by the queen's orders brought to St. Germain-en-Laye under the escort of Monsieur d'Aubigny.

== French court ==
Too proud to enter the service of the Princess de Condé, which the queen proposed to her, and neglected by Madame de Brienne, she subsisted for some time on the charity of Mesdames de Ferran and de la Flotte. At length, however, she was admitted to the queen's household in the capacity of supernumerary maid of honour, and after two years' probation was accepted as maid of honour. She figures in the Mémoires of Mademoiselle de Montpensier, who represents her as in 1658 high in the favour of Philippe, duc d'Orléans, known as Monsieur, who devoted a great part of his time and thought to her dress.

She is said to have had liaisons with Clérambault and Bouvron. On the marriage of Monsieur with the Princess Henrietta of England she was appointed lady of the bedchamber to Madame, and after the death of Madame she served Philippe's second wife, Elizabeth Charlotte of the Palatinate, sometimes called la seconde Madame, in the same capacity. From a letter of Mademoiselle de la Fayette, written in December 1672, it appears that Henrietta was on bad terms with her new mistress. After this date no more is heard of her. She seems to have been generally unpopular, and Blackhall gives her a character for ingratitude.
