= Elizabeth Douglas, Countess of Erroll =

Scottish aristocrat and poet

Elizabeth Douglas, Countess of Erroll (died 1631) was a Scottish aristocrat.

Elizabeth was the youngest daughter of William Douglas, 6th Earl of Morton and Agnes Leslie, Countess of Morton. Morton had seven daughters, alleged to have been called the "pearls of Lochleven".

== Marriage negotiations ==
She married Francis Hay, 9th Earl of Erroll on 27 June 1590. The wedding was held in private, possibly on the 27 June, for fear that King James VI might try to prevent it. He wanted the Kirk of Scotland to be satisfied first that the couple would adhere to the Protestant religion. The Earl of Morton was threatened with legal action.

Despite the King's objections the marriage had been backed by powerful courtiers. The Master of Glamis wanted it to strengthen a political faction. Sir Robert Melville encouraged the marriage believing it would reduce the influence of the Earl of Huntly on Erroll. There was opposition too, on 21 April 1590 the Earl of Montrose and others at Megginch Castle had tried to persuade Erroll not to marry her, but Erroll argued he could change his wife's friends' alliances.

There had been negotiation between the Earl of Morton and the Earl of Erroll about which daughter he would marry. Morton tried to make Erroll marry one of her older sisters, but he liked the youngest.

The marriage bands were authorised at the Newhouse of Lochleven on 2 June 1590, and proclaimed at the Kirk of Slains by Alexander Bruce.

== Catholic life in Protestant Scotland ==
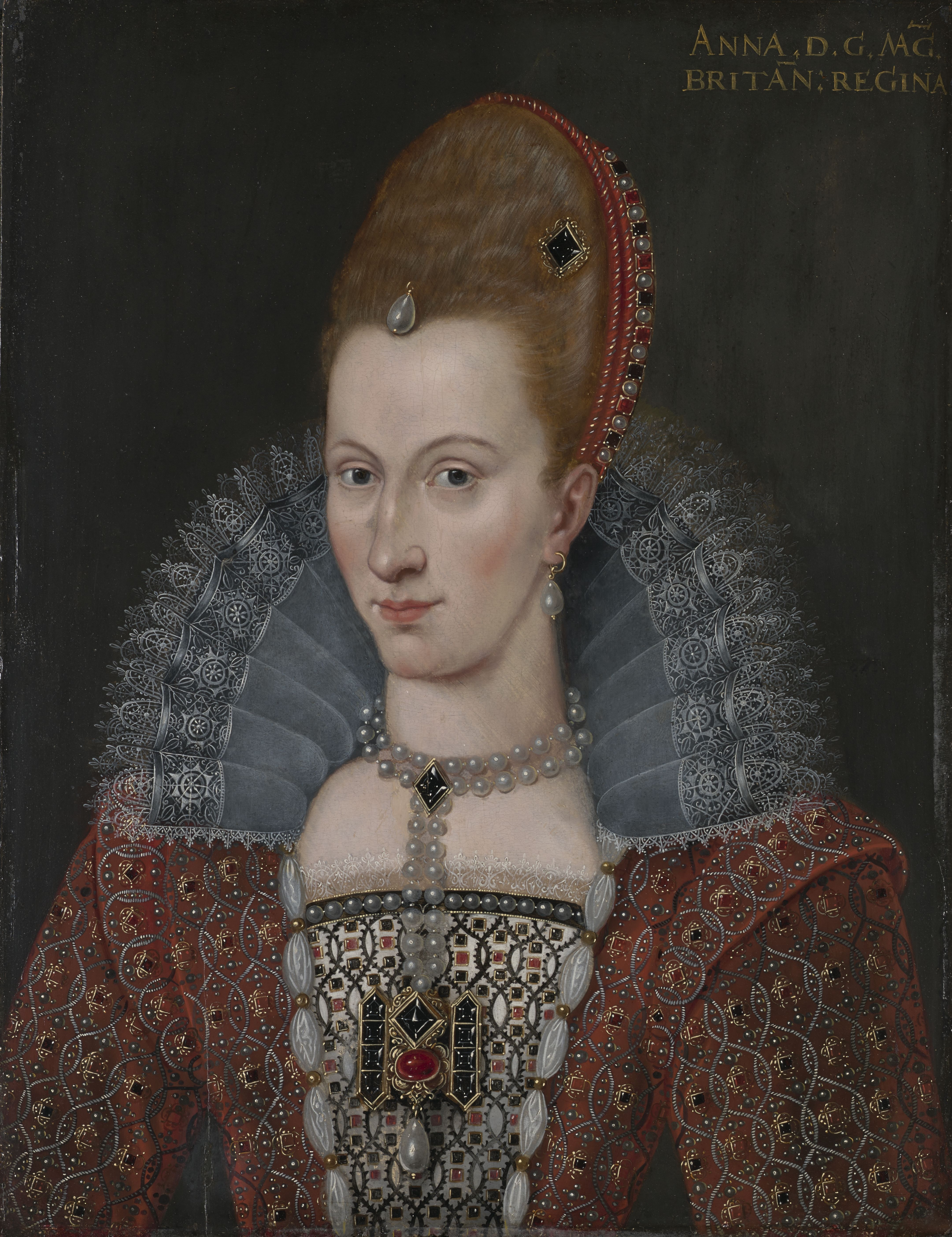
Anne of Denmark depicted wearing a jewel with a large diamond and a cabochon ruby, possibly the Great Harry or H of Scotland, GAC.

In February 1593 King James came north to punish and subdue the earls of Huntly, Angus, and Erroll for plotting on behalf of the Catholic faith but they went into hiding. Henrietta, Countess of Huntly and the Countess of Erroll came to him at Aberdeen and he allowed them to keep their houses and estates. In 1594 the Earl of Erroll led a rebellion which was put down by James VI. Their castle of Slains was destroyed with gunpowder and cannon. Next year, according to Dr James MacCartney, the Countess of Errol hired masons to repair the building. The English diplomat George Nicolson heard that Anne of Denmark had offered the jewel called the "Great H of Scotland" to her friend the Countess of Erroll as recompense for the demolition of Slains.

The ministers of the Kirk of Scotland petitioned the king in March 1595 that she and the Countess of Huntly should be forced to live in or near Edinburgh. She was pregnant and the Privy Council ordered she should go to Dalkeith Palace after the child was born. She had a child in September 1595 and John Bothwell, Abbot of Holyroodhouse was sent as the king's representative to the christening.

At the ceremony of the Riding of the Parliament in Edinburgh in January 1598, she and Anna of Denmark and the Countess of Huntly rode to Mercat Cross and watched the symbolic restoration of the forfeited earls of Angus, Erroll and Huntly, by the Lyon King of Arms to the sound of trumpets. It was said that the queen had so much favour to Elizabeth Douglas and the Countess of Huntly that sometimes she shared a bed with one or the other, and was often seen kissing Elizabeth.

It has been suggested that she was the "E. D." who composed two sonnets addressed to the poet and secretary of Anne of Denmark, William Fowler. However, Fowler wrote an epitaph in 1594 for another Elizabeth Douglas, the wife of an East Lothian laird and diplomat, Samuel Cockburn of Templehall, and she may have been the author "E.D".

== Family ==
Elizabeth Douglas and Francis Hay had five sons and eight daughters:

- William Hay, 10th Earl of Erroll, who married in 1618 Anne Lyon, daughter of Patrick Lyon, 1st Earl of Kinghorne and Anne Murray.
- George
- Francis
- Thomas
- Lewis
- Anna Hay, a lady in waiting to Anne of Denmark, who married George Seton, 3rd Earl of Winton
- Jean Hay, who married John Erskine, Earl of Mar
- Mary Hay, who married Walter Scott, 1st Earl of Buccleuch
- Elizabeth Hay, who married; (1) Hugh Sempill, 5th Lord Sempill; (2) James Douglas, 1st Lord Mordington
- Sophia Hay, who married John Gordon, Viscount Melgum, son of George Gordon, 1st Marquess of Huntly
- Margaret Hay, who married Sir John Seton of Barns, son of Sir John Seton of Barns and Anne Forbes.
- Isabel Hay, died unmarried
- Helen Hay (died 1625, aged 10)
