= New Slains Castle =

Ruined castle in Aberdeenshire, Scotland

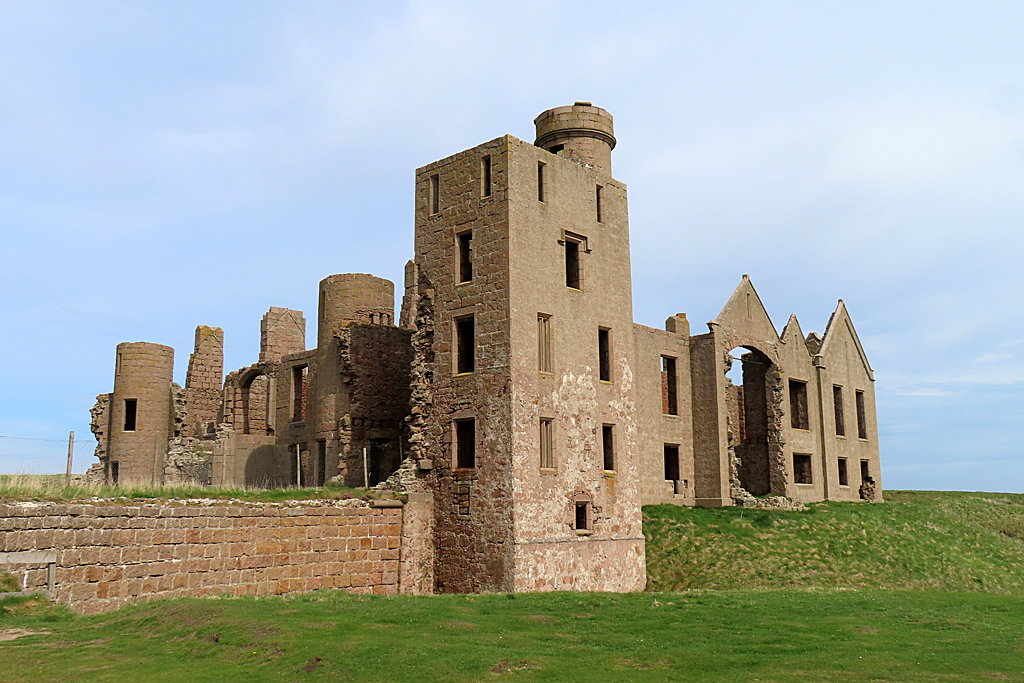
- The castle in 2025

- Location in Aberdeenshire
- 57°24′55″N 1°49′56″W
- OS grid reference: NK 102 361

History
- Built: after 1597
- Built for: Francis Hay, 9th Earl of Erroll
- Rebuilt: 1836–1837

Site notes
- Architect: John Smith

Listed Building – Category B
- Official name: New Slains Castle
- Designated: 11 April 2018
- Reference no.: LB52471

Slains Castle, also known as New Slains Castle to distinguish it from the nearby Old Slains Castle, is a ruined castle in Aberdeenshire, Scotland. It overlooks the North Sea from its cliff-top site one kilometre (5/8 mile) east of Cruden Bay.

The core of the castle is a 16th-century tower house, built by the 9th Earl of Erroll. Significant reconstruction of the castle has been carried out a number of times, lastly in 1837 when it was rebuilt as a Scots Baronial mansion. At one time it had three extensive gardens but is now a roofless ruin. Plans to restore the castle have been on hold since 2009. It is a Historic Environment Scotland Category B listed building. The castle is mentioned in two locally set novels written by Bram Stoker, The Watter's Mou' and The Mystery of the Sea. Tentative links have also been made between the castle and his novel Dracula, although it is an internet myth that he got the idea for his famous novel on seeing Slains Castle for the first time.

== History ==
New Slains Castle was the home of the Earl of Erroll, a hereditary title within the Hay family. The Hays had been a powerful dynasty in the area since the 14th century and owned large tracts of land in eastern Aberdeenshire, notably the parishes of Slains and Cruden. In 1453, Sir William Hay was made the first Earl of Erroll by King James II. At this time, the local seat of power was Old Slains Castle, near Collieston, some eight kilometres (five miles) southwest.

The first building on the site of New Slains Castle was constructed for Francis Hay, 9th Earl of Erroll, following the destruction of the original Slains Castle. Named Bowness, it was located on a sea cliff close to what is now the village of Cruden Bay.

Francis Hay, 9th Earl of Erroll, a convert to Roman Catholicism, had conspired with other Catholic nobles, including the Earl of Huntly, with whom he joined in a brief rebellion in 1589. Erroll was also a signatory of the "Spanish Blanks", documents signed by members of the Catholic nobility of Scotland, and otherwise left to be filled in with the terms of Spanish aid. Erroll was declared a traitor in 1594, and Old Slains Castle was destroyed in October on the orders of King James VI.

After a period abroad Erroll returned to Scotland, and abjured Roman Catholicism in 1597, subsequently returning to royal favour. He abandoned Old Slains and built a courtyard and square tower on the present site, probably around 1600, although the exact date is not known. The earliest mention of the tower was made in a gazetteer published in 1660. Another document from 1732 specifically mentions that Bowness was built from new ‘by Francis, Earl of Erroll, on the king's demolishing the original castle of Slains’. The name 'Bowness' derives from a double rock arch at the north end of the peninsula, thought to resemble a bow.

The original building was added to in 1664, when the wings around the courtyard were extended by the addition of a gallery or corridor, and was renamed New Slains Castle. In 1707 the entrance front was renewed.

New Slains Castle is linked to the Jacobite cause in Scotland. Three Jacobite Countesses of Erroll, residents of New Slains Castle: Lady Catherine Carnegie, Lady Anne Drummond ('Anne Erroll'), and Lady Mary Hay, 14th Countess of Erroll.

Lady Catherine Carnegie, married to Gilbert Hay, 11th Earl of Erroll, took part in the Jacobite rising of 1689. She arranged for letters to be smuggled in and out of Edinburgh Castle during the siege of 1689, including letters forwarded to her by King James II & VII And later, John Graham, 1st Viscount Dundee, contrived to have her arrested with a bogus letter from King James, purporting that an army from Ireland intended to land in South West Scotland. The intended diversion turned out to be pointless. Let free, and then arrested a second time with a letter from King James, Catherine eventually escaped to France, where she was made the Governess of the infant James Francis Edward Stuart.

In 1705, Louis XIV, King of France, who was at war with England and Scotland, sent secret agent Nathaniel Hooke to foment a Jacobite Rebellion in Scotland. Hooke landed at New Slains Castle, having been brought from Dunkirk by the fourteen-gun French navy frigate, Audacious. He was met there by lady Anne Drummond. His efforts came to nothing after they were thwarted by James Hamilton, 4th Duke of Hamilton, head of the Country Party in the Scottish Parliament.

Hooke returned to New Slains Castle in 1707, the year of the formation of the United Kingdom. Using the castle as his base, he toured Scotland gathering military intelligence to establish the feasibility of a combined French / Jacobite invasion of Scotland. He returned to France, where his report was read to Louis XIV at the Palace of Versailles. The French King authorised the invasion.

The planned French invasion of Britain (the objective was Scotland) was launched in 1708. Between 5,000 and 6000 men, both French and Jacobite, sailed from Dunkirk in 28 ships with James Edward Stuart on board the flagship. The fleet eventually reached the Firth of Forth, where the intention had been to disembark the invasion army together with James Edward Stuart at Leith. However, fifty ships from the newly formed British navy now arrived to chase the invasion fleet out of the Forth and up the northeast coast of Scotland. Discussion took place about landing James Edward Stuart at an unspecified Aberdeenshire castle, plausibly New Slains Castle, although the French admiral of the fleet refused to allow this to happen. The invasion was abandoned, and the fleet returned to Dunkirk.

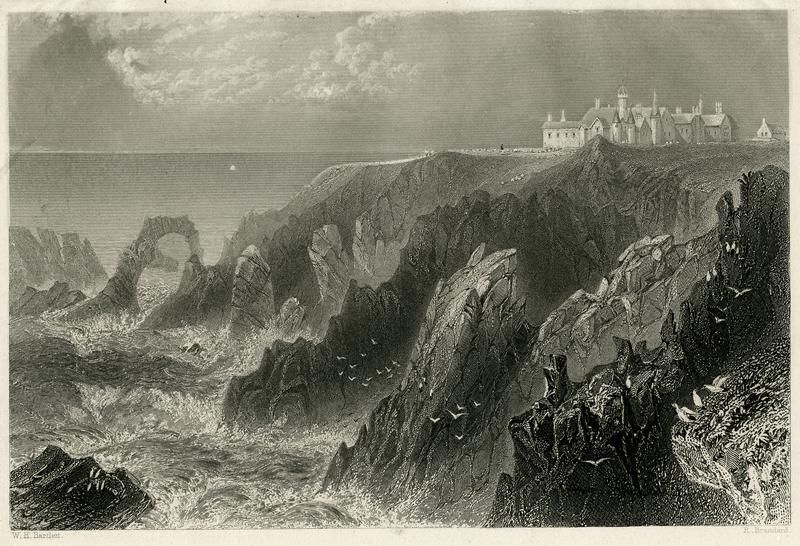
Robert Brandard (1805–1862) – Slains Castle near Peterhead – ABDAG017331 – Aberdeen City Council (Archives, Gallery and Museums Collection)

Mary Hay, 14th Countess of Erroll recruited men from Aberdeenshire during the 1745 Jacobite Rebellion. When she died childless in 1758, the Earl of Erroll title passed to her great-nephew, James, Lord Boyd. James was the grandson of her sister, Lady Margaret Hay and the son of William Boyd, 4th Earl of Kilmarnock, who was executed on Tower Hill in 1746. James, Lord Boyd changed his name to Hay. The Kilmarnock title survived in part down the succession, whereby, up until recently, the heir to the Erroll earldom was referred to as Lord Kilmarnock. Samuel Johnson and James Boswell visited New Slains Castle in 1773. They were entertained by James, Lord Boyd (Hay) and his brother Charles. They spent a night in the castle, although James Boswell did not sleep well:

I had a most elegant room. But there was a fire in it which blazed, and the sea, to which my windows looked, roared, and the pillows were made of some sea-fowl’s feathers which had to me a disagreeable smell. So that by all these causes, I was kept awake a good time. I began to think that Lord Kilmarnock might appear to me [beheaded in 1746], and I was somewhat dreary. But the thought did not last long, and I fell asleep.

Neither Johnson or Boswell mention that the earl and his brother had fought on opposite sides at the Battle of Culloden in 1746; The earl with the government army, and his brother Charles (and his father) with the Jacobite army.

In 1820, William Hay, 18th Earl of Erroll, married Lady Elizabeth FitzClarence, the illegitimate daughter of King William IV and Dorothea Jordan. In the 1830s, the 18th Earl commissioned the Aberdeen architect John Smith to remodel the castle. This resulted in a virtual rebuilding of Slains in a Scots Baronial style, including granite facings, in 1836–1837. Gardens were laid out in the late 1890s by the landscape architect T. H. Mawson.

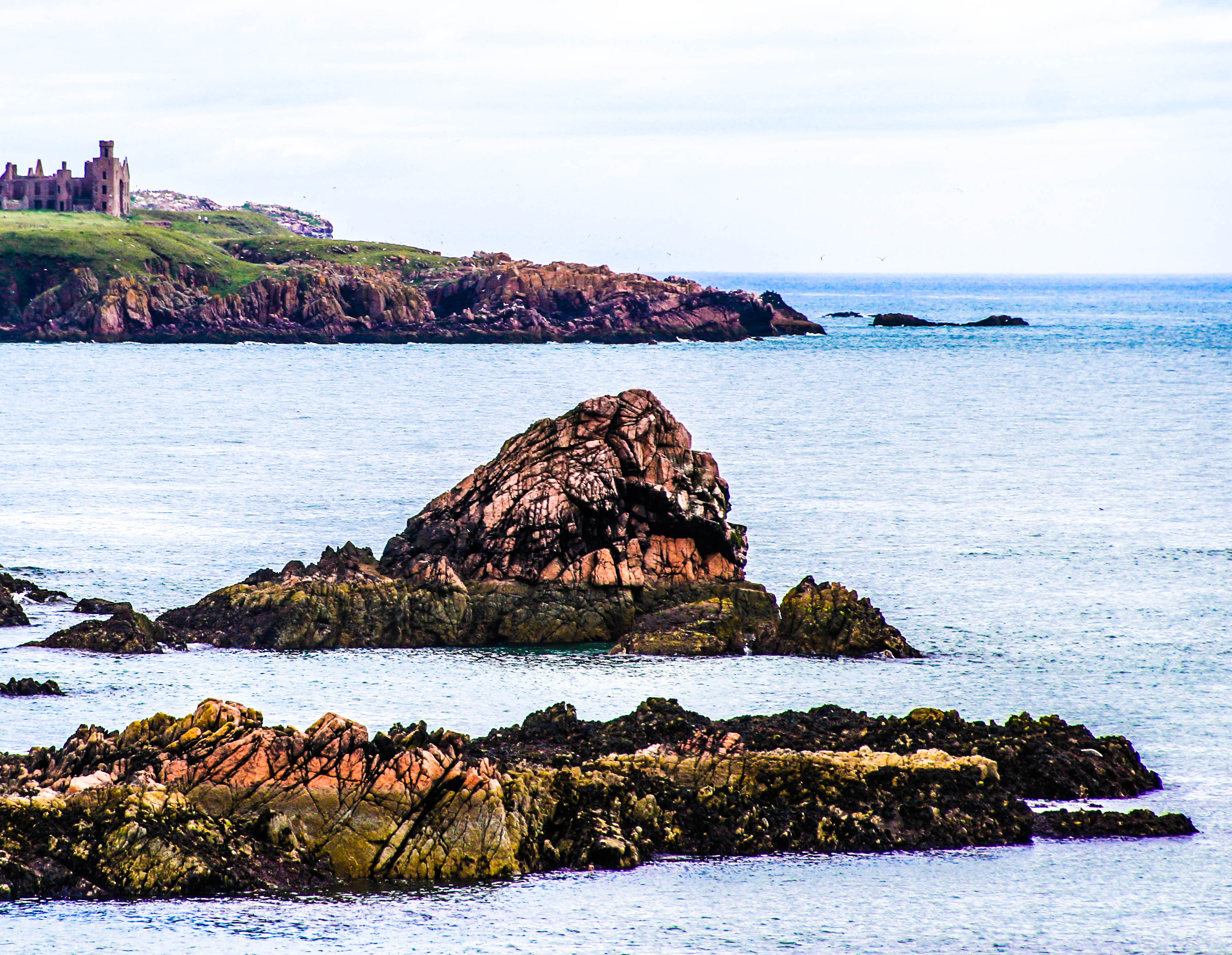
Slains Castle has been linked with Bram Stoker's novel Dracula

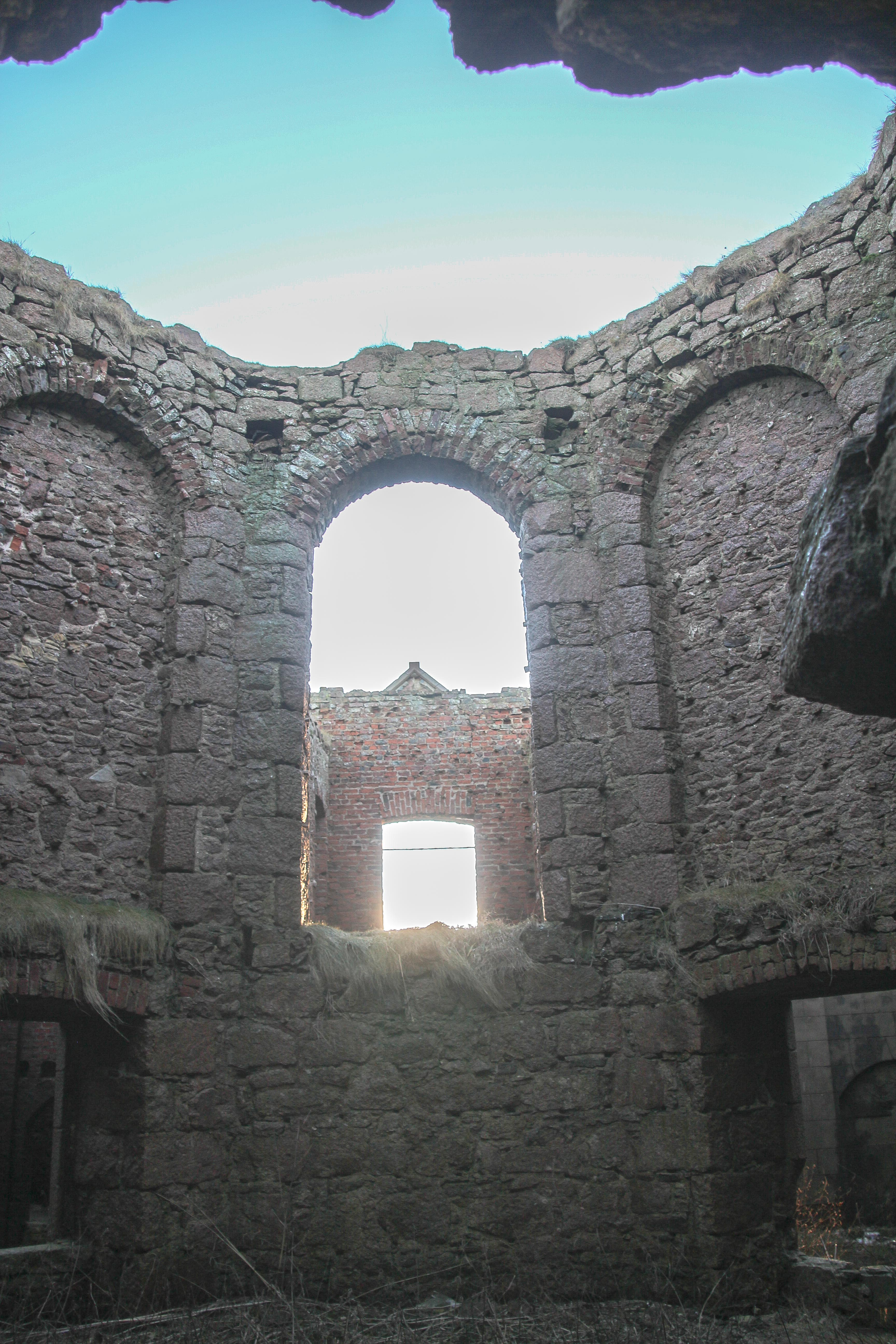
The ruins of the octagonal hall in Slains Castle which may have been the inspiration for the octagonal room in Castle Dracula.

=== Bram Stoker and Dracula ===
Slains Castle is associated with the author Bram Stoker, who was a regular visitor to nearby Cruden Bay between 1892 and 1910. The castle is mentioned in his locally set novels, The Watter's Mou' and The Mystery of the Sea:

At first the cleft runs from west to east, and broadens out into a wide bay of which one side a steep grassy slope leads towards the new castle of Slains...’ The Watter’s Mou’. My own section for watching was between Slains Castle and Dunbuy, as wild and rocky a bit of coast as anyone could wish to see. Behind Slains runs in a long narrow inlet with beetling cliffs, sheer on either side, and at its entrance a wild turmoil of rocks are hurled together in titanic confusion. The Mystery of the Sea.

The castle may have provided the inspiration for Kyllion Castle in The Jewel of Seven Stars, a mansion house on the edge of a cliff.

Slains Castle is commonly linked with Dracula, although the claim, often seen on the internet, that Slains Castle inspired Dracula when Bram Stoker saw Slains Castle for the first time is a myth. The earliest entry in Bram Stoker's written notes for Dracula dates from 1890, two years before Bram's first visit to Cruden Bay. They mention that the novel will include a castle setting, although at this time no specific castle has yet been identified.

Although New Slains Castle did not inspire the plot for Dracula, it is feasible that it provided a visual palette for Bram Stoker when he started writing the book in Cruden Bay in 1895. And a distinctive room in New Slains Castle, the octagonal hall, may be the source for the octagonal room in Dracula.

‘The Count halted, putting down my bags, closed the door, and crossing the room, opened another door which led into a small octagonal room lit by a single lamp, and seemingly without a window of any sort.’ Dracula.

=== Later history ===
Shortly before 1900, Charles Hay, 20th Earl of Erroll, became an occasional visitor to the castle, spending most of his time in England. New Slains Castle was rented out as a high-class summer holiday residence, notably to Robert Baden-Powell in 1900, and Prime Minister H. H. Asquith in 1903 and 1908. Winston Churchill spent two nights at the castle in 1908 as a guest of H. H. Asquith.

In 1916, the 20th Earl of Erroll sold New Slains, ending more than 300 years of occupation by the family. He had been impoverished by the lavish spending of the family fortune by his ancestors, an agricultural recession starting from the 1890s, and inheritance taxes. It was purchased by Sir John Ellerman, the wealthy but secretive owner of the Ellerman Lines shipping company, who never visited the castle. It was put up for sale again in 1922 and bought by Percy P. Harvey from London who then disposed of the land, although the castle remained unsold.

The castle was then bought by Charles Brand Ltd, a Dundee-based demolition company. The company specialised in buying Scottish castles and mansions for demolition, and was active in the period between 1920 and 1969. For example, Scottish Environment Heritage lists 20 major properties demolished by the company between 1945 and 1969, including Panmure House in Angus. Charles Brand Ltd made money by selling off masonry and other fittings.

The demolition of New Slains Castle went ahead in the summer of 1925. The slates and lead were removed from the roof for resale. An advertisement headlined ‘Demolition of Slains Castle’ in the Aberdeen Press and Journal, 5 September 1925, listed various items for sale: ‘Battens, Flooring, sarking, slates, doors, windows, baths, wash hand basins, sinks, stable fittings, stone paving and other building materials’. Perhaps because of limited demand, a new advertisement appeared notifying a sale at the castle on Saturday 17 April 1926. Now included in the inventory were the following: panel doors (yellow pine), water closets, bedroom grates, granite sills and corners.

New Slains Castle is now a roofless shell, with most of the outer and inner walls standing to full height. In 2004, it was reported that the Slains Partnership was preparing plans for the restoration of the building and conversion into 35 holiday apartments. In August 2007, the scheme was granted outline planning permission by Aberdeenshire Council, but the plans were put on hold in 2009 due to the Great Recession.

== Architecture ==
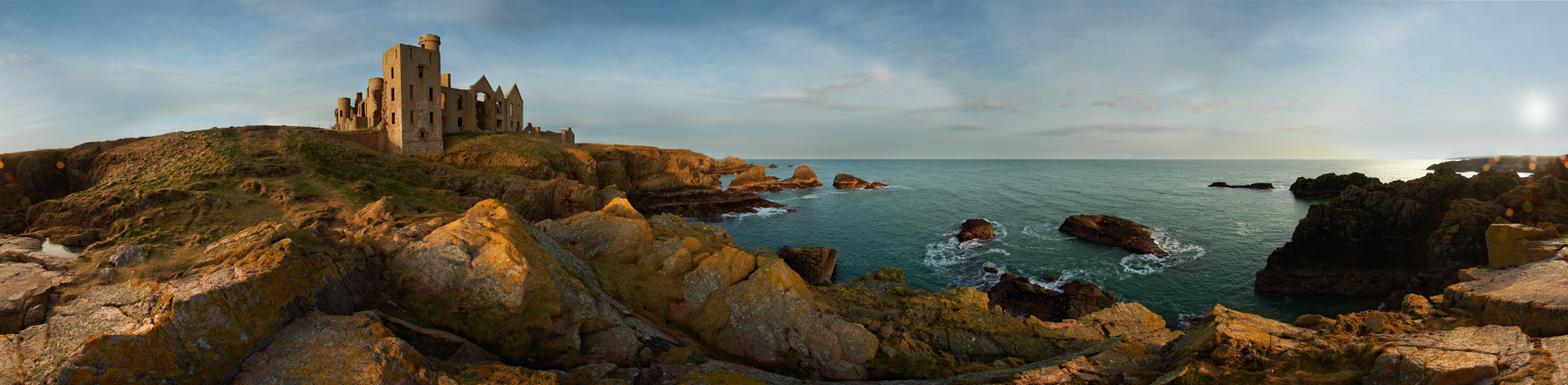
New Slains Castle

New Slains Castle is a Historic Environment Scotland Category B listed building. At first inspection, the ruin appears to be a blend of several different architectural styles and periods, due to diverse masonry including older mortared granite, mortared medieval red brick, mortared sandstone and newer well-faced granite. In fact, most of the architecture seems to derive from a rather cohesive interval 1597 to 1664, which construction is the most expansive and includes the mortared rough granite and medieval brick. The 1836 work adds smoother granite facing that contrasts with the older construction style.

The defensive works of the castle include the use of the North Sea cliffs; an abyss to the west that functions as a deep impassable moat; and a ruined rampart that would have been the main entrance on the south. The ruins include reasonably well-preserved elements of three- and four-storey structural elements and a basement course over some of the range, especially at the eastern side. There are well-preserved basement kitchen works with numerous fire pits and masonry indented storage spaces. The internal doorways are primarily of well-preserved wooden lintel construction, with numerous examples of mortared sandstone and medieval brickwork archways. The interior of the ground level is a maze of passageways and smaller rooms, reflecting a high state of occupancy in 17th-century times.

== Legends ==
The castle is claimed is to be haunted by the spirit of Victor Hay, 21st Earl of Erroll. However, this is an internet myth, probably due to a misunderstanding. Victor Hay, using his courtesy title of Lord Kilmarnock, wrote a novel, Ferelith, about a ghost in a Slains Castle look-alike called Gowrie Castle. The ghost of Lord Gowrie gets the (living) Lady Ferelith pregnant. A daughter is born and Lady Ferelith dies in childbirth.

== See also ==
- Slains Pursuivant
