= Glenlivet =

River valley in the Scottish Highlands

- Gleann Lìobhait
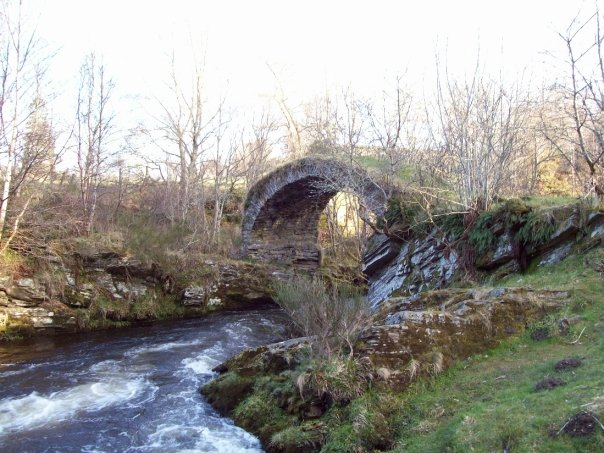
- Remains of an early 18th-century bridge over the River Livet near its confluence with the River Avon

- Location within Scotland
- Floor elevation: 200 m (minimum)

Geography
- Location: Highlands of Scotland
- Coordinates: 57°20′57″N 3°19′55″W
- River: River Livet
- Interactive map of Glenlivet

Glenlivet (Gleann Lìobhait) is a glen in the Highlands of Scotland through which the River Livet flows.

The river rises high in the Ladder Hills and flows past several distilleries and hamlets and then onto the Bridgend before joining the River Avon, one of the main tributaries of the River Spey. Glenlivet is known for the Glenlivet Estate and the whisky The Glenlivet. The Battle of Glenlivet was fought on the hillsides of the glen in 1594.

== Etymology ==
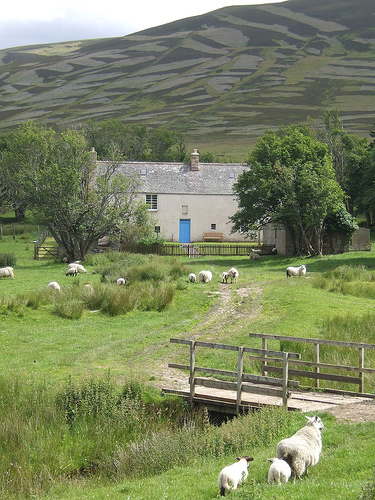
The museum at Scalan

According to the Cairngorms National Park Authority the river takes its name from Gaelic lìomhaid meaning "shining or flooding one". William J. Watson, whilst confirming the Gaelic Gleann Lìomhaid, understood the derivation to be similar to that of Glen Lyon with the root meaning being "smooth" or "polish". A similar suggestion by Ross is that Livet may be derived from the liobh + ait meaning "slippery" or "smooth" + "place" Nicolaisen suggested that it is either an early Gaelic or pre-Gaelic name meaning "full of water" or "floody".

== Geography and history ==
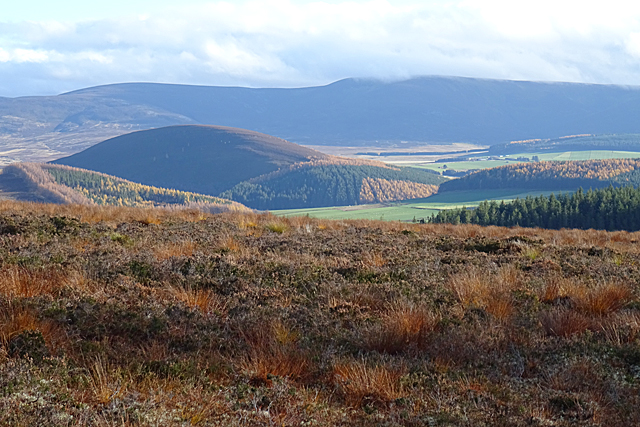
The Bochel (centre left) and the braes of Glenlivet

No part of Glenlivet is lower than 200 metres (660 ft) above sea level. The River Livet rises in the Ladder Hills east of Tomintoul and to the north of Strathdon. It begins when various small streams coalesce including the Back Burn and the Kymah Burn, below the summits of Carn an t-Suidhe and Carn na Bruar at roughly 350 metres (1,150 ft) above sea level. The river is then joined by the Blye Water that descends from near the 804 metres (2,638 ft) summit of Càrn Mòr. The next watercourse to join the river is the Crombie Water. The upper reaches of the Crombie are the location of the cottage of Scalan. Now a museum, this was the site of the 18th century College of Scalan, which was a hidden Catholic seminary during the anti-Catholic persecutions of the time. Downstream from Scalan is the settlement of Braes of Glenlivet, the location of the Braeval distillery. Below the distillery the Crombie Water rounds the prominent hill of The Bochel and then joins the River Livet.

Less than a kilometre from this confluence is the hamlet of Tomnavoulin which hosts the Tamnavulin distillery. Further downstream the river is joined from the east by the Burn of Nevie. The name 'Nevie' may be derived from *nemeton and indicate a sacred place of the pre-Christian Celtic culture. Just west of Bridge of Nevie was a medieval church building known as Chapel Christ. By 1869 all trace of the structure had disappeared. Further downstream on the west bank of the river is The Glenlivet distillery owned by the Chivas Brothers that sells more than a million cases per annum.

Next, the Burn of Tervie flows down from Ben Rinnes to the east just below the distillery. The Battle of Glenlivet was fought on a hillside between the Burn of Nevie and the Burn of Tervie in October 1594. This was fought between a Protestant advance force loyal to King James VI who were commanded by Archibald Campbell, 7th Earl of Argyll (then a teenager), against Catholic forces commanded by George Gordon, 6th Earl of Huntly, and Francis Hay, 9th Earl of Erroll. The Catholics won the day decisively but "fled before the following forces of the King".

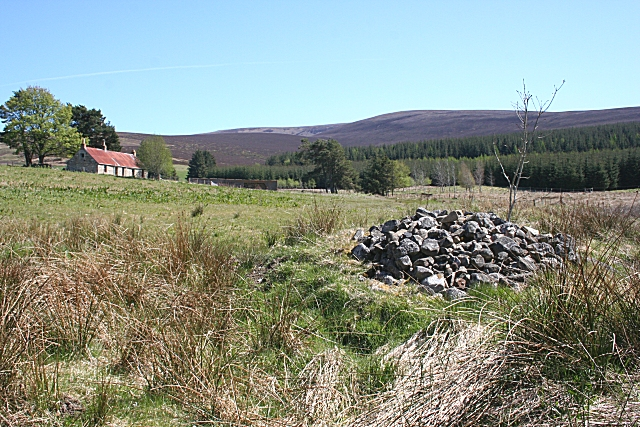
Cairn marking the spot where Patrick Gordon of Auchindoun was killed at the Battle of Glenlivet

The River Livet flows from the vicinity of the battle and on to Bridgend of Glenlivet, passing under the remains of an 18th-century bridge before joining the River Avon (pronounced A'an).

In the 21st century, Glenlivet is a community council area in Moray that encompasses the glen itself plus some surrounding settlements and historic parishes such as Tomintoul, Ballindalloch, Inveravon and Kirkmichael.

== Estate ==
The Glenlivet Estate is part of Crown Estate Scotland.

For about 500 years until the early 20th century, the estate belonged to the family of the Dukes of Gordon and the Duke of Richmond. The Crown Estate acquired the property of 23,000 hectares (57,000 acres) in 1937, which today has over 30 farms, 3,500 hectares (8,600 acres) of commercial forests and substantial moorland. The estate, part of which is in Strath A'an, operates a ranger service and visitor centre and has a network of walking trails.
