= James MacCartney (physician) =

Scottish medical practitioner and apothecary

James MacCartney was a Scottish medical practitioner and apothecary in Edinburgh in the 1590s who collected information for the English diplomat Robert Bowes.

== Career ==
MacCartney was a relation of Thomas Hamilton of Priestfield. He was usually known as "Dr MacCartney" and sometimes given the codename "Tertius". He signed his letters to Bowes with a sketch of a flower with three petals.

In September 1595 MacCartney wrote to Bowes about the Catholic earls, with the news that Elizabeth Douglas, Countess of Erroll was now allowed by James VI to rebuild Old Slains Castle, and the Earl of Huntly would be able to do the same at Huntly Castle if stonemasons were available. Both castles had recently been slighted on royal orders. Margaret Douglas, Countess of Bothwell, whose husband Francis Stewart, 5th Earl of Bothwell was a rebel, had been shown some favour by the king at Hamilton Palace.

MacCartney sent copies of verses made at court, including the King's own lines about William Fowler, a poet who served Anne of Denmark as her secretary, and promised a verse made about the Treasurer, Walter Stewart of Blantyre. These verses do not survive. He also forwarded verses presented at court by an Irish poet Walter Quin in December 1595.

In December 1595 MacCartney and the surgeon James Henrysoun were asked to perform an autopsy on Jonet Lyle who was thought to have been poisoned.

A letter of June 1596 mentioned a possible border raid near Carlisle and that Anne of Denmark, who was now pregnant, was moving to Dunfermline Palace, at the suggestion of the Octavians, a group of financial administrators with some overlap with her council.
