= Henrietta Stewart =

Scottish courtier (1573–1642)

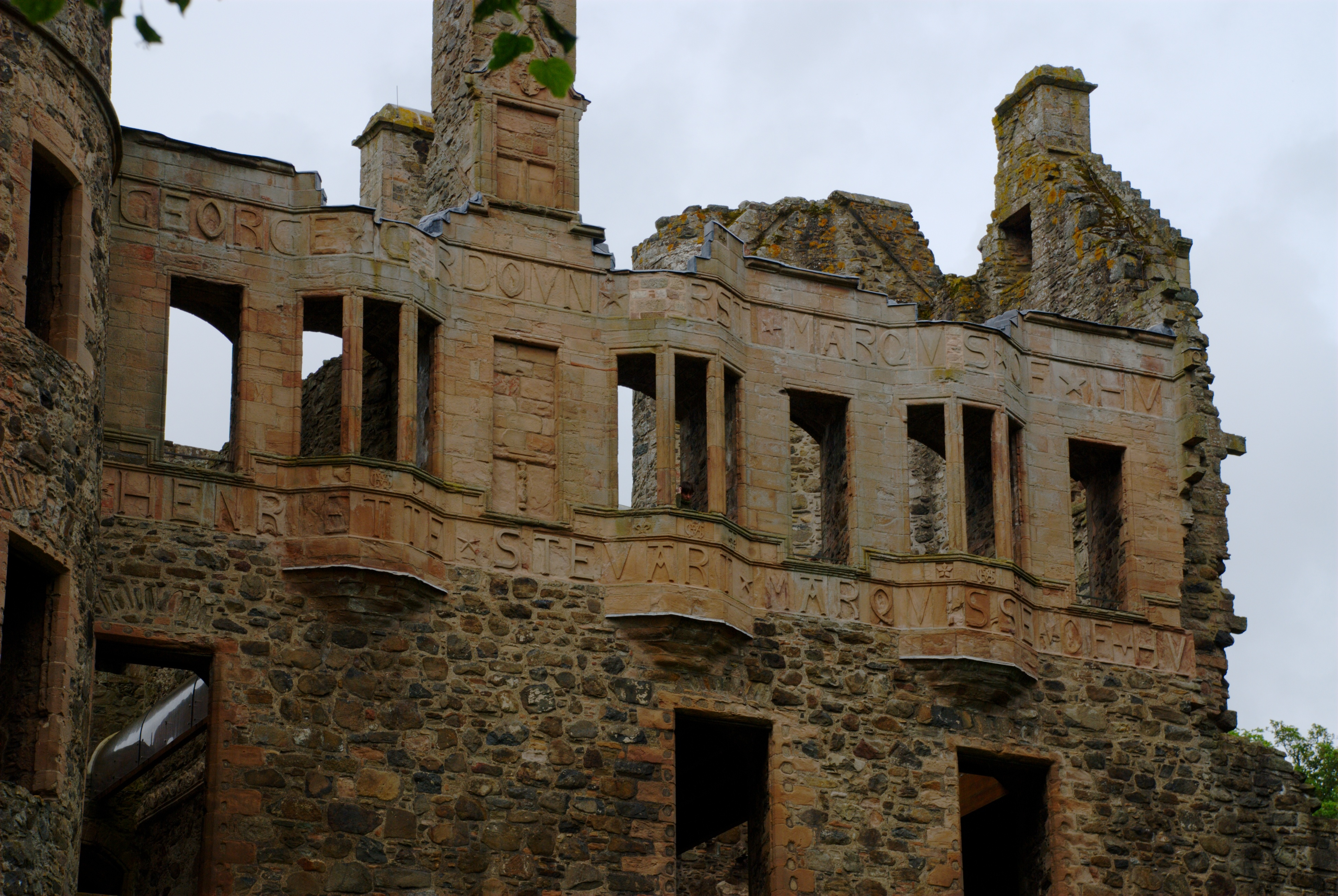
The names of Henrietta and her husband are carved across the façade of Huntly Castle.

Henrietta Stewart (1573–1642) was a Scottish courtier. She was the influential favourite of the queen of Scotland, Anne of Denmark.

== Life ==
Henrietta Stewart was the daughter of Esmé Stewart, 1st Duke of Lennox, favourite of James VI of Scotland, and Catherine de Balsac. On 16 June 1581 the king gave Henrietta the right to award the marriage of the Earl of Huntly, which was forfeited to the crown. Their marriage contract was made in 1586, while she was in France, and James VI granted the Duke of Lennox 5000 merks to organise her transport from France.

Henrietta, her sister Marie and her brother Ludovic came back to Scotland from France in November 1583 with their mother to see James VI. The two sisters returned in June 1588 and were lodged in Edinburgh at the town's expense.

=== Marriage and masque ===
On 21 July 1588, Henrietta married George Gordon, Earl of Huntly, at Holyroodhouse. Before the wedding the couple were made to declare their (Protestant) faith, without which the minister John Craig would not declare the banns. According to a letter of George Dundas, the Archbishop of St Andrews gave a sermon in French and the assembled nobility were dressed in French style. James VI of Scotland wrote a masque to be performed at the wedding celebrations. The king sent requests to lairds, like Robert Murray of Abercairny, for "venison, wild fowls, fed capons" for the feasts. The celebrations involving "plays and masquerades" lasted two or three days. Francis Stewart, 5th Earl of Bothwell gave her a chain of pearls and hair garnishings, and wore several jewels himself which Dundas called "mirrors". There was "great triumph, mirth, and pastime", and James VI may have written the leading role in his masque to perform himself in person.

As was customary in Scotland, after her marriage she did not change her name, but continued to sign letters and documents as "Henriette Stuart". Her sister, Marie Stewart, became a lady-in-waiting in the household of Anne of Denmark in December 1590 at Henrietta's request, which increased Henrietta's access at court. She married the Earl of Mar in December 1592. Their younger sister Gabrielle was a nun in France at Glatigny, but a scheme for her to marry Hugh Montgomerie, 5th Earl of Eglinton in 1598 came to nothing.

After the murder of the Earl of Moray by the Clan Gordon at Donibristle in February 1592, James VI allowed her to stay at court, and gave her and her followers legal protection.

In February 1593 King James came north to punish and subdue the earls of Huntly, Angus, and Erroll for plotting on behalf of the Catholic faith but they went into hiding. Henrietta and Elizabeth Douglas, Countess of Erroll came to him at Aberdeen and he allowed them to keep their houses and estates. She was at court in May 1593 with a "greater train and busier heads than are thought fit" according to the English diplomat Robert Bowes. He and some of the Privy Council tried to persuade James VI to send her away. On 31 May she accompanied the queen and her sister the Countess of Mar to Leith to inspect the ship of the Danish ambassadors Niels Krag and Steen Bille at Leith.

In June 1593 Robert Bowes argued the king should send her from court. A Scottish ambassador Sir Robert Melville sent to London would be able report this action to Queen Elizabeth, who would approve of it. Henrietta Stewart went to Leith and intended to go north to Carneborough near Strathbogie. However, she came back to court in September 1593 at the invitation of the queen, first to Falkland Palace, and it was supposed Anne of Denmark had invited her to please the king. Henrietta Stewart was pregnant at this time.

Henrietta came to be a favourite of the queen, Anna of Denmark, and exerted an influence over her which became controversial. Henrietta was known to be a fervent Catholic, and the friendship between her and Anne was politically sensitive and developed into a cause for conflict between the king and the queen. It also brought Queen Anne negative publicity and exposed her to criticism from the Scottish church. Henrietta Stewart is said to have played a part in Queen Anne's rumoured secret Catholic conversion, and was reported to have given her a French catechism in 1593. When she parted from the court in April 1594, the disapproving English ambassador Robert Bowes wrote that the queen gave her gifts that were "liberal and exceeding the common order and proportion used here."

=== Seeking audience at court ===
Henrietta was able to further her husband's cause at court even when he was forfeited, except in June 1594 when James expressly forbade her attendance. She defied his order, and came to Leith and visited Anne of Denmark at Holyroodhouse in "base array", disguised as a servant, on a day when the king had gone to Stirling Castle to see the building work on the new Chapel Royal.

James VI told the English ambassador Robert Bowes that "by evil advice the Queen was drawn lately to give over-great countenance to the Countess of Huntly". The king suggested that problems were partly caused by friction between some members of his Privy Council and the council appointed to manage the queen's estates.

Bowes realised that Huntly and his factions depended on the Countess interceding for them. She was able to give the king and Privy Council a petition for the restoration of the Huntly lands. The Queen helped, and when it was refused asked for the lands to be given to her. Bowes was able to search the registers to check that such a document had not been issued.

=== James VI comes to Huntly Castle ===
On 6 July 1594 James VI ordered Robert Melville to tell her to leave Edinburgh, and she went to Seton Palace and took a ship to Aberdeen. At Huntly Castle, the Earl was confidently building a new hall and gallery.

At the end of October 1594 James VI came to Huntly Castle to demolish or slight the building. David Foulis wrote to Anthony Bacon that the Countess of Huntly watched the demolition and was not allowed to have an audience with the king to plead her case. The kirk minister Andrew Melville was present and urged James VI to blow the castle up.

The king placed the castle and estates in the hands of Sir John Gordon of Pitlurg, but on 9 November 1594 he requested that Pitlurg should not take up her rental incomes. Her brother, the Duke of Lennox, was the left as the king's lieutenant at Elgin, declared that she was his enemy because her husband had not left Scotland, and she would not get her "living" or landed income unless she came south.

=== Lord Gordon at Court ===
The ministers of the Kirk of Scotland petitioned the king in March 1595 that she and the Countess of Erroll should be forced to live in or near Edinburgh. They also requested that her son, Lord Gordon, should be kept by the king.

In October 1596 pressure was exerted on her and her husband to convert from Catholicism by taking away her eldest son Lord Gordon. He was delivered to Anna of Denmark to be brought up at court and sent to the University of Edinburgh as a pupil of Robert Rollock. Anna of Denmark bought him clothes including a velvet coat and a belt with a little dagger. David Moysie wrote that Henrietta's representations to a Convention of the Estates were twice rejected. On 19 October 1596 Henrietta's representatives presented her signed seven-point offer to the Synod of the Presbyteries of Moray at Elgin on behalf of her husband, undertaking to assist the Protestant ministry and to eject Jesuits from his company.

=== In favour again ===
Henrietta was a godmother to Princess Elizabeth at her christening on 28 November 1596. She attended the birth of Princess Margaret at Dalkeith Palace in December 1598 and Anne of Denmark gave her a jewel set with diamonds worth 1,500 crowns. She held Prince Charles at his christening in 1600. It was noted in November 1600 that she was "chiefest" in favour with Anna of Denmark.

At the ceremony of the Riding of the Parliament in Edinburgh in January 1598, she and Anna of Denmark and the Countess of Erroll rode to Mercat Cross and watched the symbolic restoration of the forfeited earls of Angus, Erroll and Huntly, by the Lyon King of Arms to the sound of trumpets. It was said that the queen had so much favour to Henrietta and the Countess of Erroll that sometimes she shared a bed with one or the other.

In April 1601 two male servants of the Marquess of Huntly were banished from Edinburgh for life for hearing the mass, and Henrietta Stewart was requested to remove from her company two female servants Margaret Wood and Barclay who had heard mass. She was at Stirling Castle on 24 December 1602 seeing Prince Henry and her sister, the Countess of Mar, and both sisters travelled to Holyrood Palace the next day.

In March 1609 the Venetian ambassador in London, Marc' Antonio Correr heard that she had written to Anne of Denmark to intercede with King James for her husband, who was imprisoned in Scotland as a Catholic. James replied to Henrietta that Anne would not interfere with royal orders.

She died on 2 September 1642 in Paris. She was buried at Lyon where her mother was buried.

Her name is carved in stone across the upper storey of Huntly Castle in 20-inch letters, in equal prominence to her husband's.

== Surgundo and Cherina ==
An anonymous author of the late 1590s composed an epic poem 'Surgundo: The Valiant Christian' which features George Gordon and Henrietta as Surgundo and Cherina. Many names in the poem are simple anagrams, her father, the Duke of Lennox, was Prince Exonill, Thulyne is Huntly, and so on. Verses in praise of Henrietta include:

But O Cherina, dare I be so bold
To aim at thy perfections yet untold
When as Apollo, father of the arts
Upon a time to try his daughter's parts
Sets the nine maids of memory at strife
To paint pure virtue's picture to the life
...
Cherina, O, Cherina is my theme.

== Family ==
It was reported that she had a son in February 1590. Her children included:

- Anne Gordon, who married James Stuart, 3rd Earl of Moray.
- Elizabeth Gordon, who married Alexander Livingston, 2nd Earl of Linlithgow in 1611.
- Mary Gordon, who married William Douglas, 1st Marquess of Douglas.
- George Gordon, 2nd Marquess of Huntly, and Earl of Enzie.
- Francis Gordon (d. 1620)
- Adam Gordon of Aboyne, and later of Auchindoun
- Laurence Gordon, died at Huntly aged 20
- Jean Gordon, who married Claud Hamilton, 2nd Baron Hamilton of Strabane
- John Gordon, Viscount of Melgum, who married Sophia Hay, a daughter of Francis Hay, 9th Earl of Erroll and Elizabeth Douglas. He died in the fire at Frendraught Castle in 1630.
