= Ladder Hills =

Hill range in Moray and Aberdeenshire, Scotland

Coordinates: 57°14′59″N 3°13′06″W

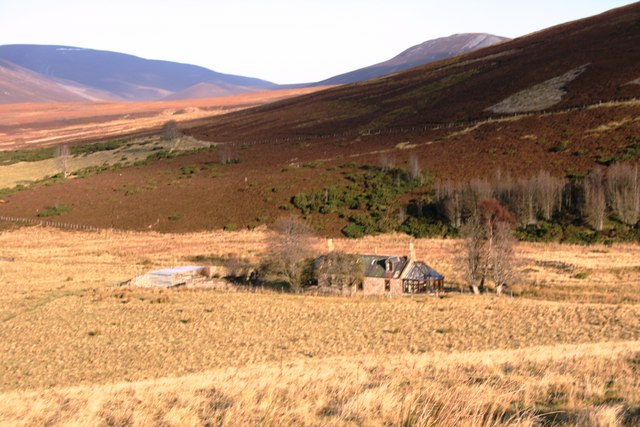
Ladderfoot in the Braes of Glenlivet, the starting point of the Ladder Road

The Ladder Hills (Scottish Gaelic: Monadh an Fhàraidh) are a range of hills in northeast Scotland which straddle the border between Aberdeenshire and Moray and form a part of the Grampian Mountains. The highest point of the range is Càrn Mòr at 804 metres (2,638 ft), which is classed as a Corbett; other named tops include Monadh an t-Sluich Leith (800m), Carn Liath (792m), Dun Muir (754m) and Little Geal Charn (742m).

The hills are formed for the most part from late Precambrian age metamorphosed sandstones and mudstones; quartzites, psammites, pelites and semipelites which together form the Ladder Hills and Kymah Quartzite formations. These are placed within the Islay Subgroup of the Argyll Group, itself a division of the late Dalradian Supergroup. Parts of the range are formed from carbonate rich rocks. Metadolerite dykes intrude this sequence in places. The rock strata are intensely folded and typically dip steeply to the southeast or northwest.

The range takes its name from the Ladder Road, a high pass which runs between Glenlivet and Strathdon (via Glen Nochty). Càrn Mòr can be accessed from both of these localities, as well as the Bridge of Leachd on the A939 road to the southwest.

The Ladder Hills lie on the north-eastern edge of the Cairngorms National Park. An area of 4353.61 hectares in the hills is designated a special area of conservation for its alpine and boreal heaths and active blanket bogs, and is also a site of special scientific interest. Wildlife includes golden plovers, dunlins, dotterels and ravens.
