= Càrn Mòr (Ladder Hills) =

Mountain in Scotland

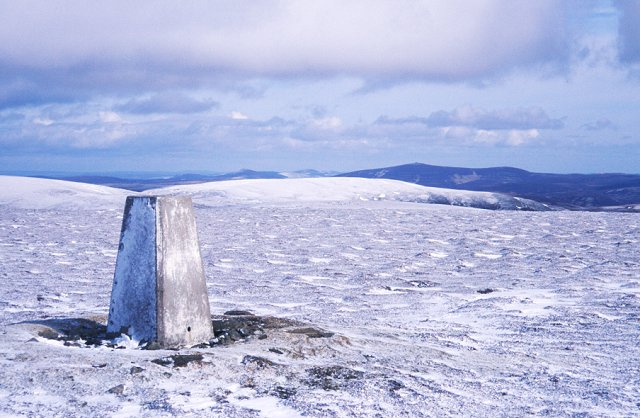
- The frozen summit of Càrn Mòr

Highest point
- Elevation: 804 m (2,638 ft)
- Prominence: 349 m (1,145 ft)
- Listing: Corbett, Marilyn
- Coordinates: 57°15′00″N 3°13′06″W

Geography
- Location: Aberdeenshire / Moray, Scotland
- Parent range: Ladder Hills
- OS grid: NJ 266 183
- Topo map: OS Landranger 33

Càrn Mòr (804 m) is the highest mountain of the Ladder Hills on the border of Aberdeenshire and Moray, Scotland. It is located northeast of the Cairngorm Mountains near Strathdon.

It rises high above Glenlivet in an area once renowned for its whisky smuggling.
