= Battle of Glenlivet =

Scottish clan battle fought on 3 October 1594 near Glenlivet, Moray, Scotland

Coordinates: 57.348964°N 3.251002°W

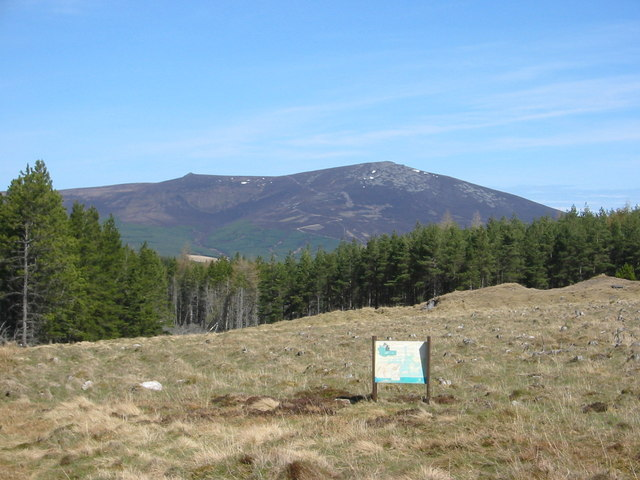
- Site of the Battle of Glenlivet
Date	3 October 1594
Location	Near Glenlivet, Moray, Scotland
Result	Catholic victory

Belligerents
(Kingdom of Scotland) Protestants: Clan Campbell; Clan Murray; Clan Stewart; Clan Forbes; Clan Maclean; Clan Grant; Clan MacNeil; Chattan Confederation/Clan Mackintosh/Clan Macgillivray	(Kingdom of Scotland) Catholics: Clan Gordon; Clan Hay; Clan Comyn; Clan Cameron; Chattan Confederation/Clan Macpherson

Commanders and leaders
Earl of Argyll	Earl of Huntly; Earl of Erroll

Strength
10,000	2,000

Casualties and losses
500	14

Registered battlefield
- Designated: 14 December 2012
- Reference no.: BTL33

The Battle of Glenlivet was a Scottish clan battle fought on 3 October 1594 near Glenlivet, Moray, Scotland. It was fought between Protestant forces loyal to King James VI of Scotland who were commanded by Archibald Campbell, 7th Earl of Argyll, against Catholic forces who were commanded by George Gordon, 6th Earl of Huntly, and Francis Hay, 9th Earl of Erroll. The Catholics won a decisive victory in the battle, but in the aftermath were subdued by King James.

== Background ==
For two centuries from the mid-15th century the Clan Gordon and Clan Campbell controlled the north-east and west of Scotland respectively, as the magnates who straddled the divide between the Scottish Highlands and Scottish Lowlands. James VI of Scotland had been unsure whether to support Catholics or Protestants. This was because the Catholics were still numerous and in particular among the nobility of the north. In 1593 he had sent a secret mission to the Pope with the idea of returning Scotland to the allegiance of Rome. However, in 1594 he once again changed his mind and decided that laws against Catholics would be enforced. Between 1588 and 1595, the northern earls of Huntly, Errol, and Angus, who were all Catholics, made overtures to Philip II of Spain, in revolt against James VI of Scotland. When James discovered this potentially treasonable correspondence with Spain he marched north and sent an advance force under Archibald Campbell, 7th Earl of Argyll, who was still a teenager, to oppose the rebel army under George Gordon, then the 6th Earl of Huntly, and Francis Hay, 9th Earl of Errol. The King's army was sent to Gordon country which was the stronghold of the Catholic side. James followed later, and was still at Holyrood Palace in Edinburgh on 3 October.

The Earl of Argyll, aged just 19 years, had with him a force of about 12,000 men. He entered into Badenoch and laid siege to Ruthven Castle on 27 September 1594. In Argyll's army was the Earl of Atholl, Lachlan Mor Maclean, chief of Clan Maclean, the Chief of Clan Mackintosh, the Laird of Grant, the Clan Gregor, MacNeil of Barra, together with the whole of Clan Campbell. Ruthven Castle was well defended by the Clan Macpherson who were vassals of the Earl of Huntly and so the Earl of Argyll had to give up the siege. Following this Argyll marched through Strathspey and on 2 October encamped at Druminnor Castle. From there Argyll sent orders for Lord Forbes, Clan Fraser of Lovat, Clan Dunbar, Clan Mackenzie, Clan Irvine, Clan Ogilvy, and the Clan Leslie to join him.

The Earls on the opposing side knew that Argyll was a youth with no military experience, whose army was made up of raw and undisciplined militia and which also included a great number of Catholics.

As Argyll approached, the Earl of Errol with 100 selected horsemen joined the Earl of Huntly at Strathbogie. Huntly's force now amounted to nearly 1,500 men, mostly horsemen, and from there they advanced to Carnborrow where the two Earls and their followers made the vow to conquer or die. They then marched to Auchindoun arriving the same day. Huntly received intelligence that Argyll was about to descend from the mountains to the lowlands and sent Captain Thomas Carr and a party of horsemen to carry out reconnaissance. They accidentally met Argyll's scouts who they chased and some of whom they killed. Huntly then resolved to attack Argyll before he was joined by the Lord Forbes and the forces which were waiting for his appearance in the lowlands.

Argyll passed Glenlivet and reached the banks of a small stream named Alltacoileachan, but he had no idea that Huntly and Errol would attack him with such an inferior force and was therefore astonished to see them approach him. He was apprehensive that Huntly's cavalry would counterbalance his numerical superiority of foot soldiers and so held a council of war to decide if they should attack or retreat to the mountains which were inaccessible to Huntly's horse, and where he could wait until the lowland forces, which were mainly cavalry, would arrive to support him. The council advised Argyll to wait for the King to arrive with his forces to support him, or at least until the Frasers and Mackenizes had arrived from the north, or the Irvines, Forbeses, and Leslies from the south. However, Argyll disregarded this decision and was determined to wait for the attack from the enemy and encouraged his men by pointing out how small their enemy was.

== Battle ==
Argyll positioned his army in two divisions on a hill between Glenlivet and Glenrinnes. On the right wing were the Macleans and Mackintoshes, commanded by Lachlan Maclean and Mackintosh of Mackintosh. On the left wing were the Grants, MacNeils, and MacGregors who were commanded by Grant of Gartinbeg. In the centre were the Campbells who were commanded by Campbell of Auchinbreck. This vanguard consisted of 4,000 men, half of whom carried muskets. The rear of the army was commanded by Argyll himself and consisted of about 6,000 men.

Huntly's vanguard consisted of 300 men who were led by Errol, Sir Patrick Gordon of Auchindoun, the Gordon Laird of Gight, the Laird of Bonnitoun, and Captain Thomas Carr. Huntly followed with the remainder with the Macpherson Laird of Cluny on his right and the Gordon Laird of Abergeldy on his left. Huntly also had three pieces of field artillery under the command of Captain Andrew Gray.

Argyll had the advantage of being on a hill and Huntly's forces were further hampered by the moss on the ground and the turf pits that had been dug. However, Huntly still advanced up the hill. He had made arrangements with Campbell of Lochnell who had agreed to join Huntly's side as soon as the battle commenced, before the charge of Huntly's cavalry. Campbell of Lochnell was at enmity with Argyll who had murdered his brother in 1592 and he was also Argyll's nearest heir. However, Campbell of Lochnell was shot dead by the first cannon fire and his men then fled from the field. Argyll's Highlanders had never seen field pieces before and were thrown into disorder and Huntly followed this up by charging at them with his cavalry. Errol was directed to attack the right wing of Argyll's army that was commanded by Maclean. However, this wing was at the top of a steep hill and Errol was annoyed by the thick vollies of shot from above, and so had to make a detour leaving the enemy on his left. Gordon of Auchindoun charged up this steep hill with a small party to attack Maclean, but he was killed doing so. Maclean received repeated assaults but maneuvered his men so well that he succeeded in cutting off Errol from Huntly. However, Huntly came to Errol's assistance and relieved him.

The battle continued for two hours. Huntly's horse was shot from underneath him but he was immediately provided with another one. The main body of Argyll's army began to give way and retreat. However, Maclean continued in the field until finding the contest hopeless and also made his retreat. The success of Huntly was mainly due to Campbell of Lochnell's treachery of Argyll and also that of Grant of Gartinbeg who retreated as soon as the action began and was in fact one of Huntly's vassals. This had left the centre and left wing of Argyll's army completely broken.

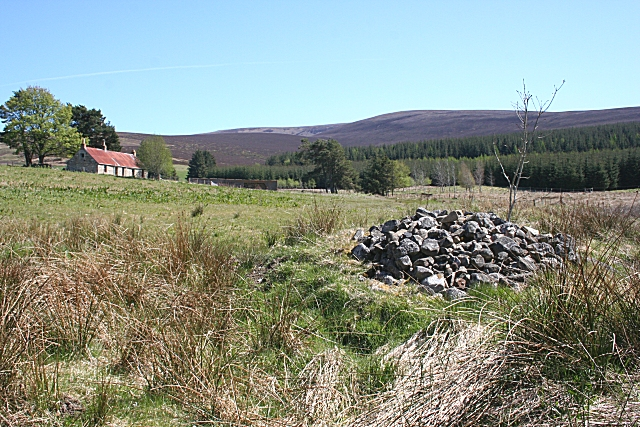
Cairn marking the spot where Patrick Gordon of Auchindoun was killed

Argyll's army suffered 500 men killed, including MacNeil of Barra, Campbell of Lochnell, and Campbell of Auchinbreck. Huntly's losses were relatively small: fourteen gentlemen were slain including Patrick Gordon of Auchindoun and the Gordon Laird of Gight. The Earl of Errol and a number of others were wounded. Errol's standard or "guidon" was captured. It depicted a cross and a man beheading a woman.

Although a battle fought at national level, Glenlivet also incorporated the feud between the Clan Cameron and Clan Mackintosh. Alexander Mackenzie states that Allan Cameron of Lochiel "at the head of a few of his clan, he performed signal service against his old enemies, the Mackintoshes, whom he defeated, and pursued with great eagerness, and did Huntly such services as merited a different reward from that which he afterwards received".

The location of the battlefield is approximately 5 kilometres (3.1 mi) east of Glenlivet. The site of the battle is currently under research, to be inventoried and protected by Historic Scotland under the Scottish Historical Environment Policy of 2009.

== Aftermath ==
The day following the battle, 4 October 1594, Huntly and Errol realised that they had no outside support. They assembled with their adherents in Elgin Cathedral where they held the last public celebration of Mass to be held in the cathedral. There they discussed the situation and Huntly's uncle, who was a Jesuit priest implored his friends and kinsman to remain in their own land. However, King James gathered a considerable force and marched into the disturbed districts with none of the rebel nobles offering resistance to the royal army. A general amnesty followed the leaders' submission, who deserted their men and fled abroad.

James VI wrote to his wife, Anne of Denmark, on 15 October describing the battle in which his "rebels have inflicted the defeat, but have received the greater loss, through the death and wounding of many of their principal gentleman". James intended to remain in the north to seek out the hiding places of the "papist lords" and invited Anne to come north. Instead, James VI returned in November, leaving the Duke of Lennox as his lieutenant. Lennox wrote a short account of his proceedings in Aberdeenshire, holding trials for prisoners, and putting castles and strongholds in the hands of loyal "best affected gentlemen of the country". Lennox's operations were in part funded a subsidy paid to James VI by Queen Elizabeth.

In early 1595, Errol embarked at Peterhead and Huntly at Aberdeen, for the Continent. As the king headed north he arranged for the houses of Sir John Ogilvie, son of Lord Ogilvie, Sir Walter Lindsay, Old Slains Castle that belonged to Errol and Strathbogie Castle that belonged to Huntly to be razed to the ground, on the pretext that Jesuits and priests had been harboured in them. Huntly spent sixteen months travelling through Germany and Flanders after which he was recalled to Scotland where along with Errol and Angus were restored to their former honours by the Parliament held at Edinburgh in November, 1597. Two years later the king elevated the Earl of Huntly to be Marquess of Huntly.

John Maclean, a chieftain of the Macleans was mortally wounded but requested to be buried at the nearby Chapel of Downan, which had apparently been destroyed by Argyll's troops before the battle and then later rebuilt.

Between 1591 and 1594 the peace in Scotland had been disturbed on several occasions caused by the activities of Francis Stewart, 5th Earl of Bothwell, who was a nephew of the third husband of Mary, Queen of Scots, James Hepburn, 4th Earl of Bothwell. This had resulted in the serious revolt of the Catholic dissidents in the north-east. However, with the death of John Maxwell, 8th Lord Maxwell, who was a staunch Catholic, at the Battle of Dryfe Sands in 1593 and the fall of the northern Earls after the Battle of Glenlivet in 1594, the Catholic cause was destroyed.

== Music connected with the battle ==
The Battle of Glenlivet in 1594 was the last time that the Highland harp was used on the battlefield, finally being discontinued in the Scottish Highlands in about 1734, leaving the Great Highland bagpipe as the instrument of Scottish martial music. A ballad called "The Battell of Balrinnes" which was written by Patrick Hannay (died c. 1630) was based on the Battle of Glenlivet and in particular Andrew Gray who commanded Huntly's artillery. Another ballad, called "Bonnie James Campbell" may have been a lament for a man killed in the battle. The oldest known copy of the ballad is in a manuscript held in the Advocates Library in Edinburgh, but its precise age is not known. Several different versions and interpretations of the ballad have since been published. The original manuscript version is as follows:

O it's up in the Highlands, and along the sweet Tay,

Did bonie James Campbell ride monie a day.

Sadled and bridled, and bonie rode he;

He came horse, he came sadle, but neer hame cam he.

And doun cam his sweet sisters, greeting sae sair,

And down cam his bonie wife, tearing her hair.

My house is unbigged, my barn's unbeen,

My corn's unshorn, my meadow grows green.'

== Archaeology ==
A group of standing stones near to the site of the battle are said to have an association with the Battle of Glenlivet, although it is not known when the stones were set.
