= Viscount of Melgum =

Historical Scottish peerage title

Viscountcy of Melgum
- Creation date: 1627
- First holder: John Gordon, 1st Viscount Melgum
- Last holder: John Gordon, 1st Viscount Melgum
- Subsidiary titles: Lord Aboyne
- Status: Extinct
- Extinction date: 1630

Viscount Melgum was a title in the Peerage of Scotland. It was created in 1627 for Lord John Gordon, second son of George Gordon, 1st Marquess of Huntly and Henrietta Stewart (see the Marquess of Huntly for earlier history of the family). He was made Lord Aboyne at the same time, also in the Peerage of Scotland. Lord Melgum had no male issue and the titles became extinct on his death in 1630.

== Viscount Melgum (1627) ==
- John Gordon, 1st Viscount Melgum (d. 1630), married Sophia Hay. He was one of several individuals killed at the Fire of Frendraught. His daughter was Henrietta Gordon.

== See also ==
- Marquess of Huntly
- Earl of Aboyne
- Viscount Aboyne
