= Glenlivet Estate =

Coordinates: 57°17′N 3°20′W

The Glenlivet Estate is located in Glenlivet, Scotland in the Cairngorms National Park. It measures 58,000 acres (230 km^{2}) and is part of The Crown Estate Scotland .

== See also ==
- Scalan
