= Old Slains Castle =

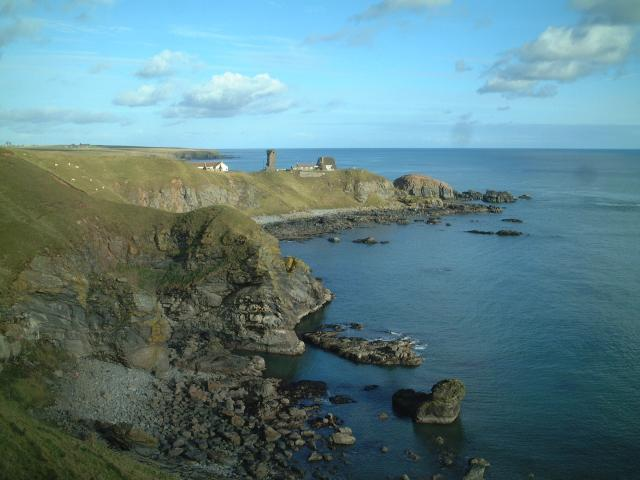
- The remains of Old Slains Castle in 2002
- Interactive map of Old Slains Castle
- 57.3609°N 1.91438°W
- OS grid reference: NK052300

History
- Built: 13th century (surviving remains largely 15th century)
- Built for: Comyn, Earl of Buchan

Scheduled monument
- Official name: Slains Castle
- Type: Secular: castle; earthwork; tower
- Designated: 26 December 1972
- Reference no.: SM3250

Slains Castle (otherwise known as Old Slains Castle) is a ruined castle near Collieston in Aberdeenshire, Scotland. It is not to be confused with New Slains Castle, a separate building located five miles (eight kilometres) northeast. Originally built in the 13th century, with the surviving remains largely dating from the 15th century, it was partly destroyed in 1594.

== History ==
The castle was originally built in the 13th century as a fortress and was the property of the Comyn, Earl of Buchan, with the surviving tower-house largely dating from the 15th century. After the forfeiture of the Comyns in the 14th century it was given to Sir Gilbert Hay by Robert the Bruce in recognition for his support against the English.

Slains Castle next comes into prominence when Francis Hay, 9th Earl of Erroll took part in a Catholic Rebellion in the north of Scotland. King James VI came to Abedeen in April 1589 and placed a garrison of soldiers at Slains Castle. In January 1593, the Earl of Erroll was said to have welcomed so many English and Scottish Catholics in a tower at Slains that he was put to great expense. The rebellion culminated in the Battle of Glenlivet in 1594, which left the Catholic army substantially weakened, and the rebellion collapsed.

James VI marched north with an army intent on capturing the leaders of the rebellion, including Francis Hay, however they evaded capture. He then proceeded to blow up their castles, including Old Slains Castle. At the king's request, Aberdeen Council provided 20 stone (130 kilograms) weight of gunpowder together with pickaxes and other tools, required for ‘demolishing and casting down of houses and fortalices to the sum of 548 pounds six shillings’. The castle was destroyed with gunpowder and cannon on 1 November. Aberdeen town council sent the stonemason John Fraser and other workmen to the demolition work at Huntly Castle and Slains, equipped with new shovels. Two walls meeting at a corner survived the explosion.

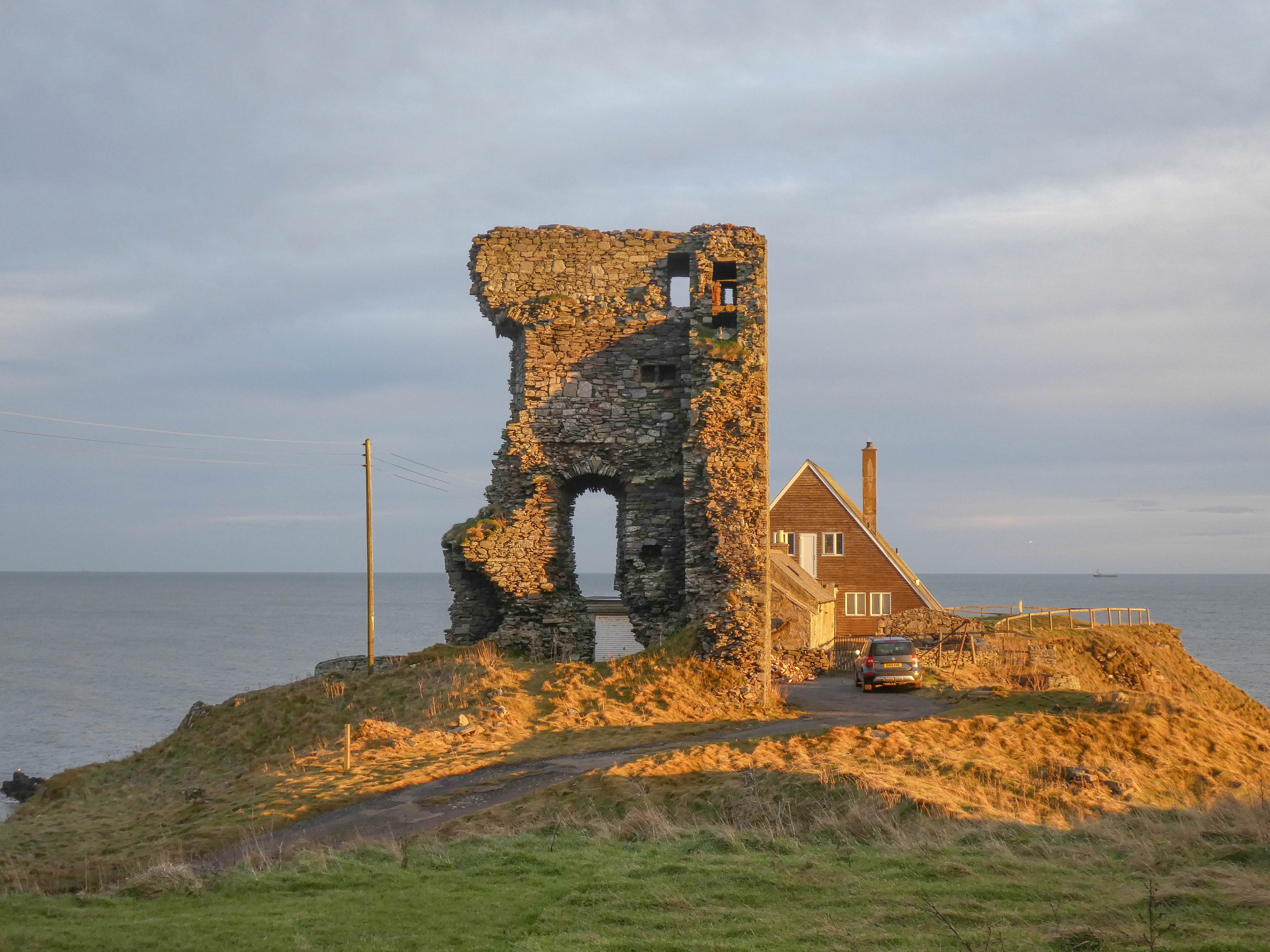
(Old) Slains Castle. What remains after it was blown up with gunpowder in 1594.

Next year, Elizabeth Douglas, Countess of Erroll, a friend of Anne of Denmark, hired masons to repair the building. However, it was beyond saving. She then moved into the farmhouse of Clochtow, 1/2 mile (800 metres) northwest of the ruined castle. She remained in this ‘mean abode, and continued there sometime after 1597, when the honours and estates were restored... The Countess, all her remaining days, preferred to her noble title of Countess of Erroll the plain designation of “Guidwife of Clochtow”, because this designation had never been taken by the crown from her, and she had been known by it during the period of her husband’s exile, when he was a wanderer abroad, and only plain “Francis Hay”.’

Francis Hay later built a tower house called Bowness on what is now the site of New Slains Castle.

== Structure ==
Originally a strongly built 5-storey oblong keep (of which a small part remains), a wall defending the landward side was added in the early 16th century.

== Modern day ==
Two sections of wall remain standing, at approximately 25 metres (82 ft) in height. The south-facing wall partially collapsed on 31 May 1979. An estimated 100 tons of rubble fell on the road next to the castle, blocking the road and partially burying a lorry.

In the 1950s, a 3-storey house was built within the ruins, adjoining a fishing cottage built in the 18th century. Since 1991 several archaeological excavations have been carried out, the last one in 2007. The remains of the old castle are designated as a scheduled monument.

== Fishing ==
The Annual Reports of the Fishery Board for Scotland provide an insight into the abrupt drop in fishing from Old Castle in 1900: "Only during the first two months of the year did the fishermen fish from this creek. They have now all left for Aberdeen and Torry."

Fishery Statistics

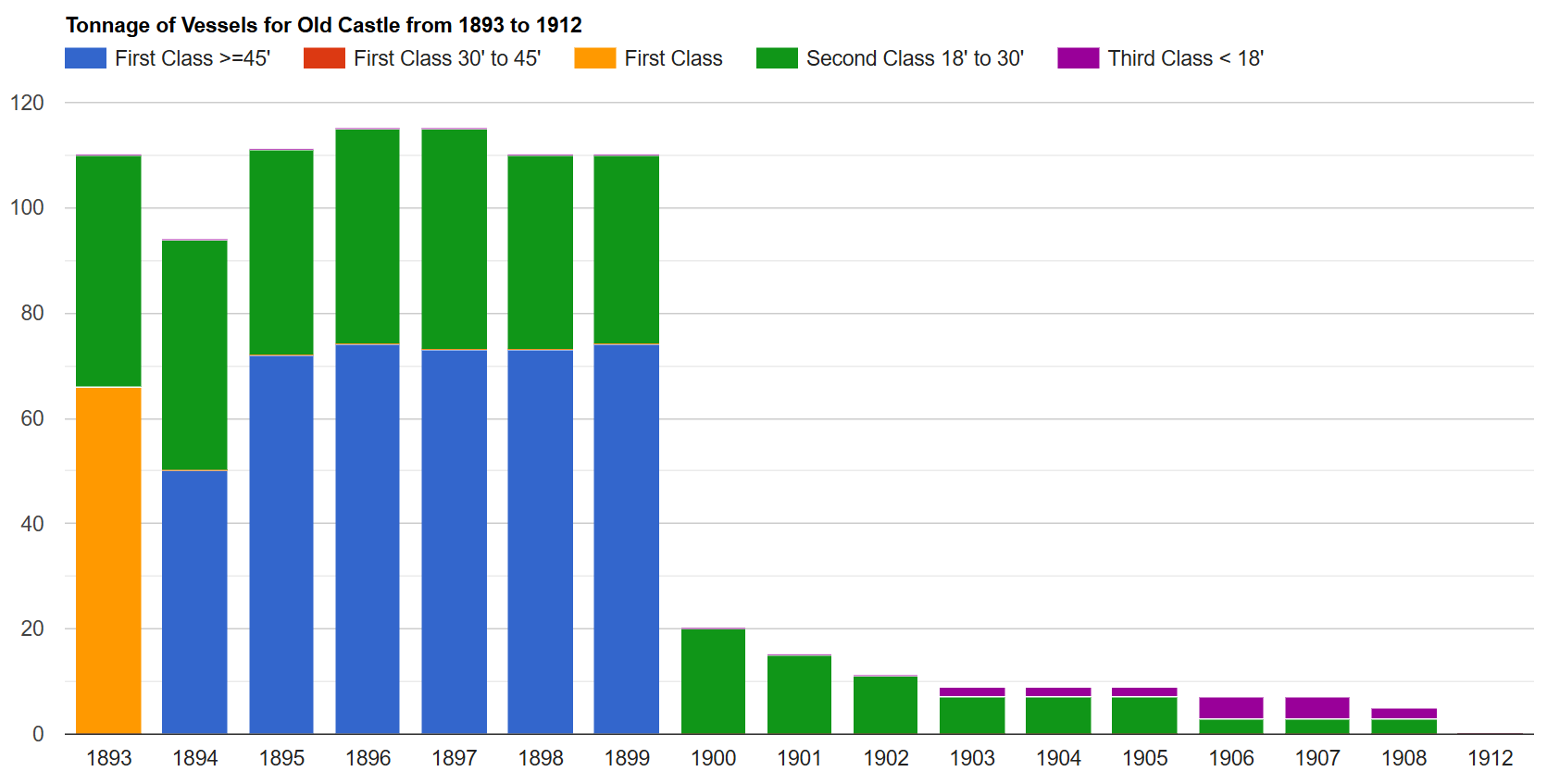
Tonnage of vessels

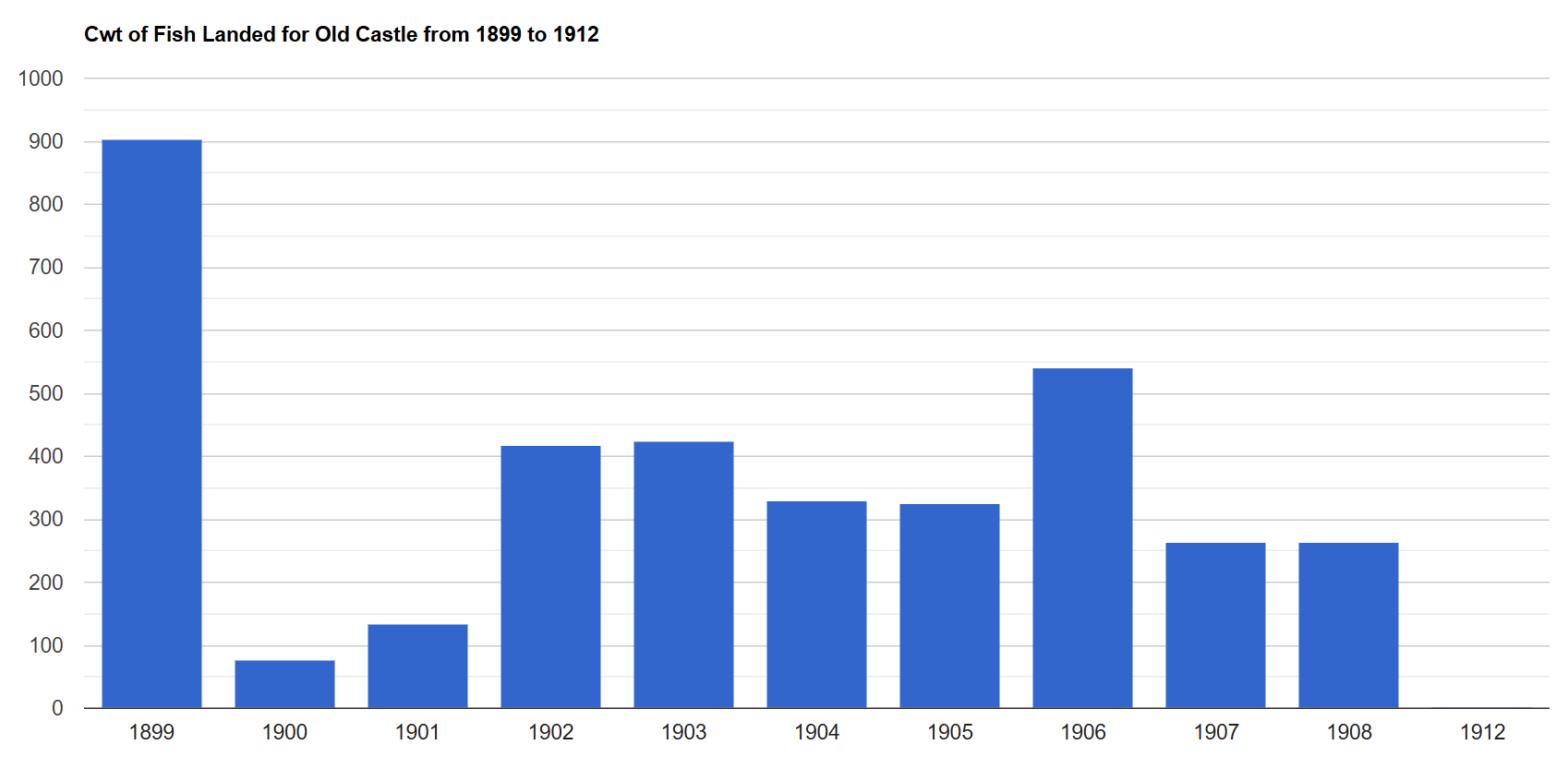
Cwt of fish landed

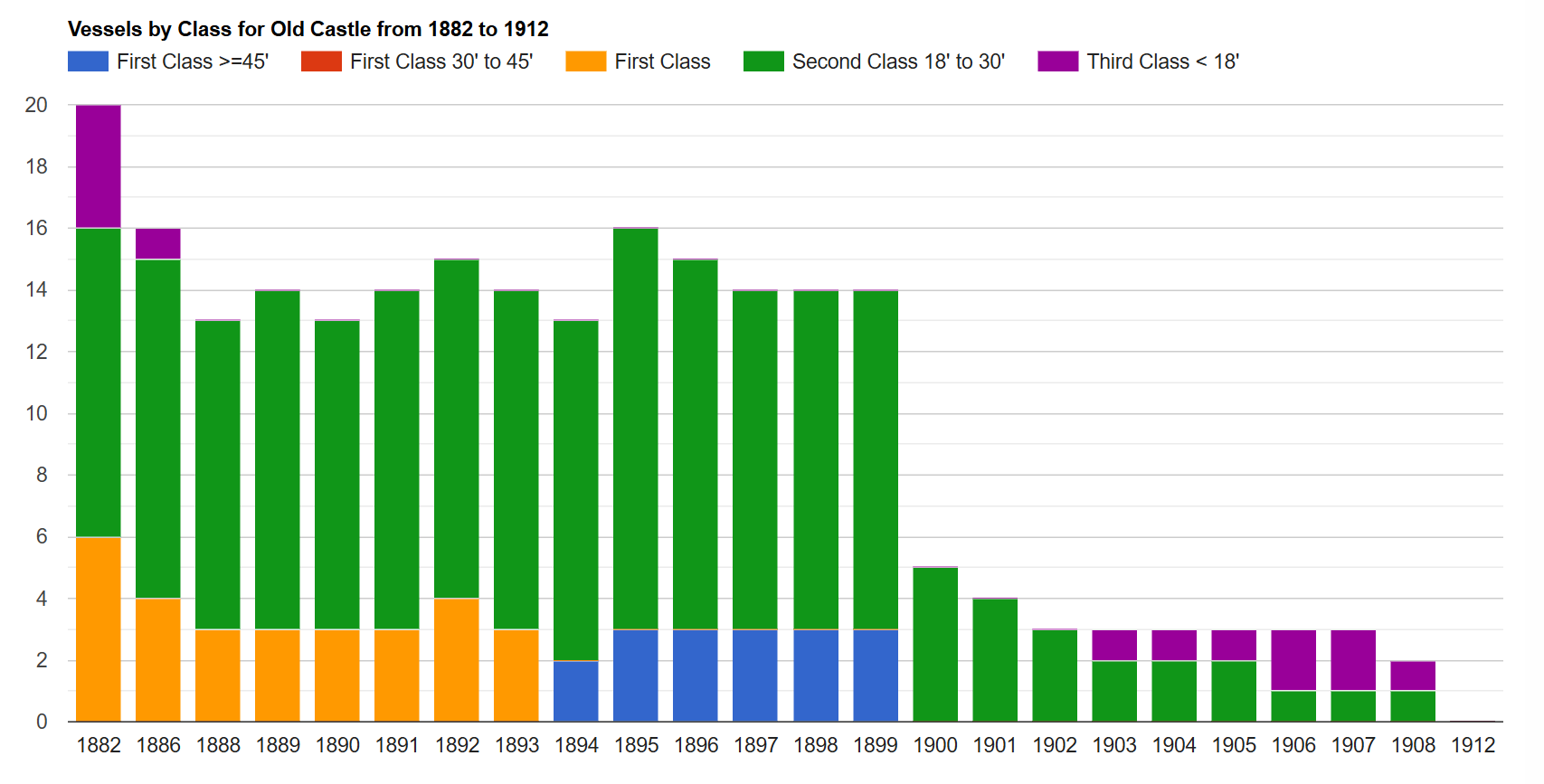
Vessels by class

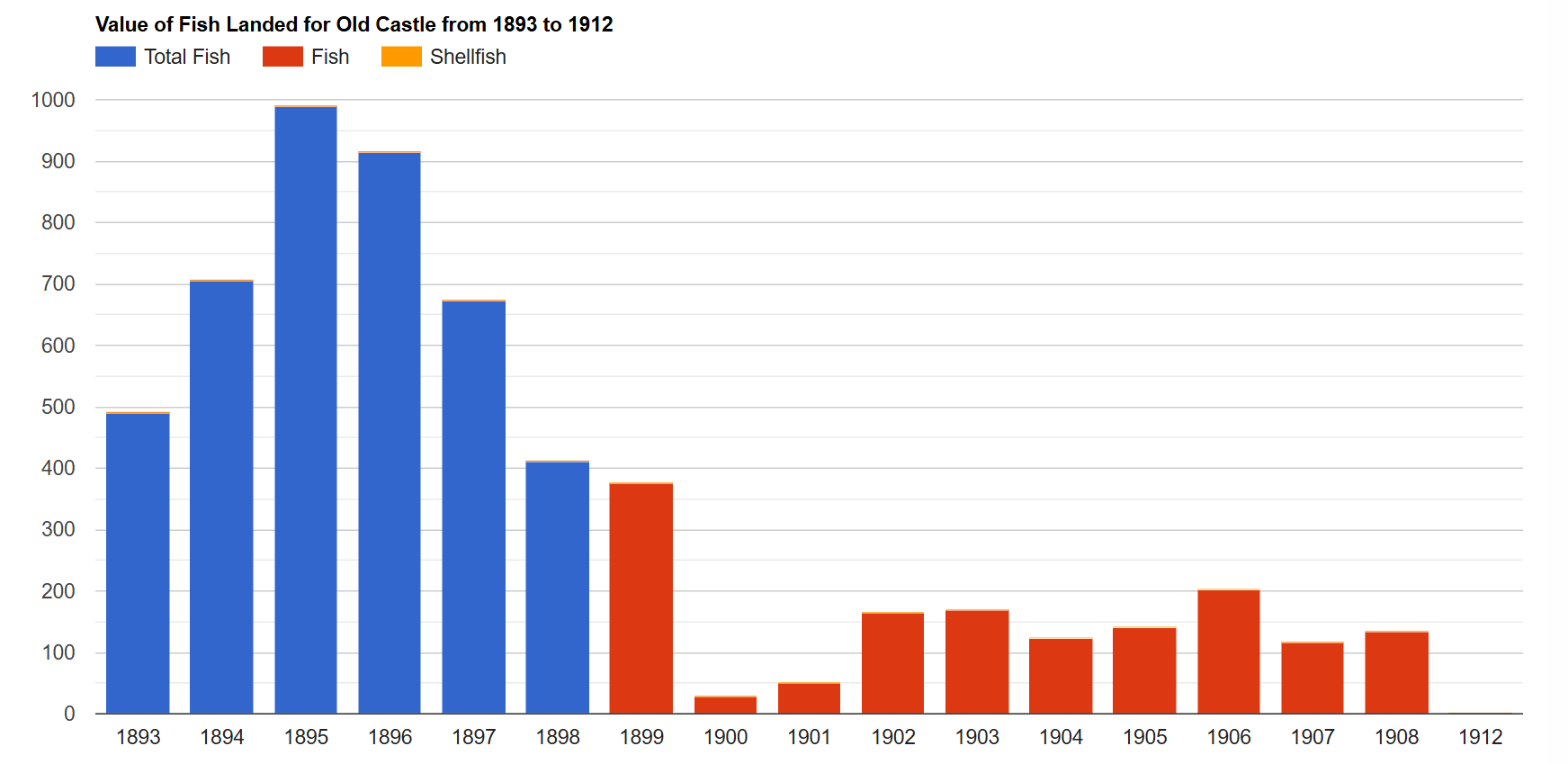
Value (£) of fish landed

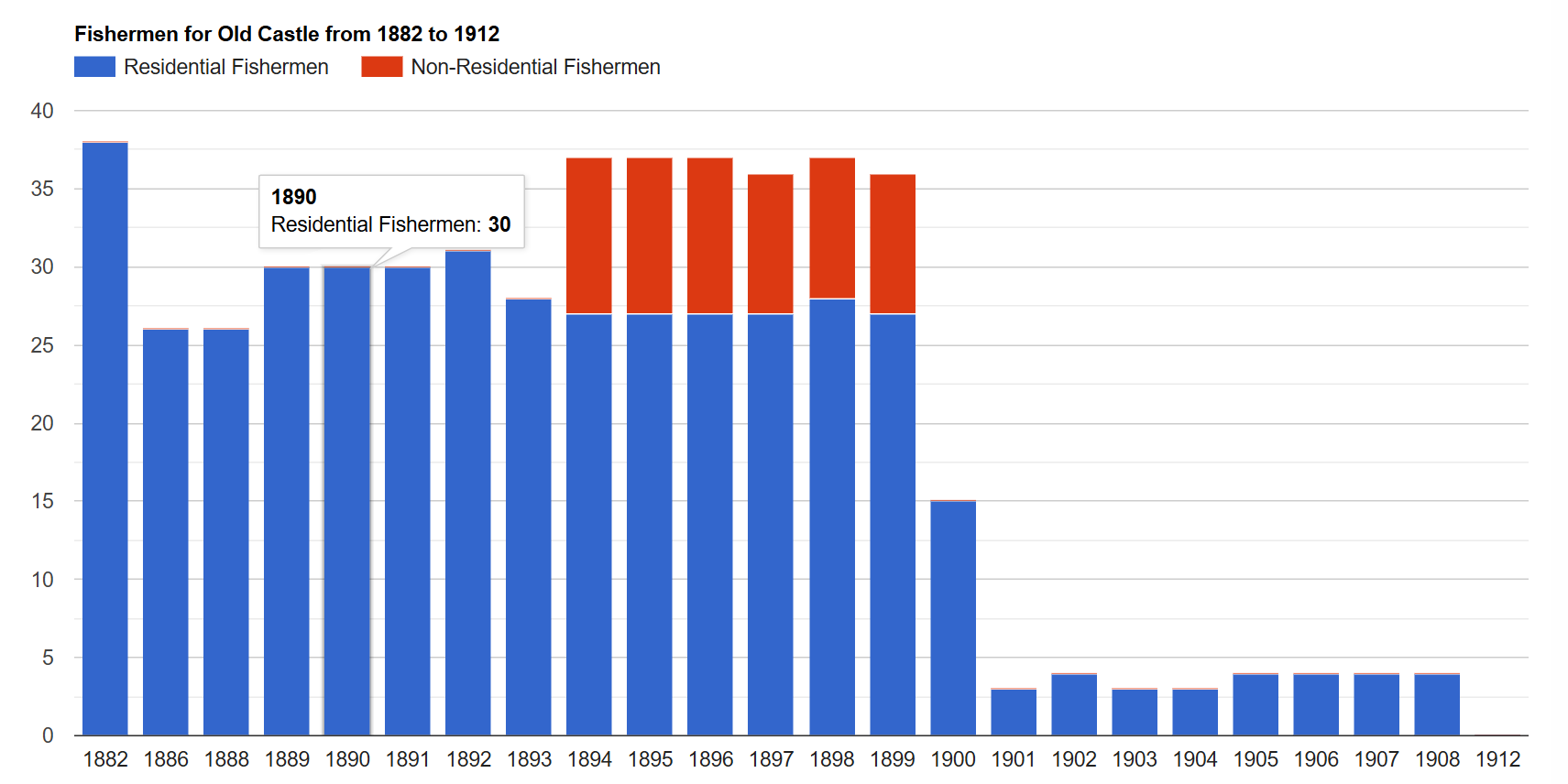
Fishermen

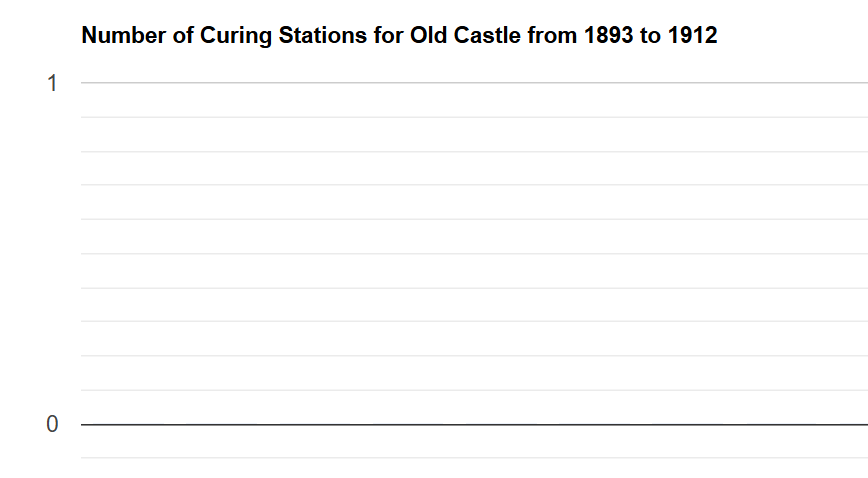
Placeholder - no curing stations
