= Sophia Hay =

Sophia Hay, Viscountess Melgum (died 1642) was a Scottish noblewoman.

She was a daughter of Francis Hay, 9th Earl of Erroll and Elizabeth Douglas.

She married John Gordon, Viscount Melgum, who died in the fire at Frendraught in October 1630. They had a daughter, Henrietta Gordon.

Sophia Hay features in Gilbert Blackhall's, A Breiffe Narration of the Services Done to Three Noble Ladyes. Blackhall, a Catholic priest, met her in 1637, and joined her household at Aboyne Castle. Blackhall described the fire at Frendraught according to her account, and laid the blame on James Crichton of Frendraught and his servant John Toash.
