= Collieston =

Village in Aberdeenshire, Scotland

Coordinates: 57°21′N 1°56′W

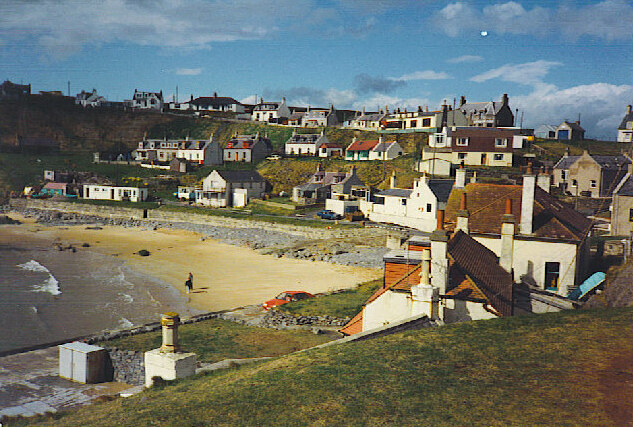
Collieston.

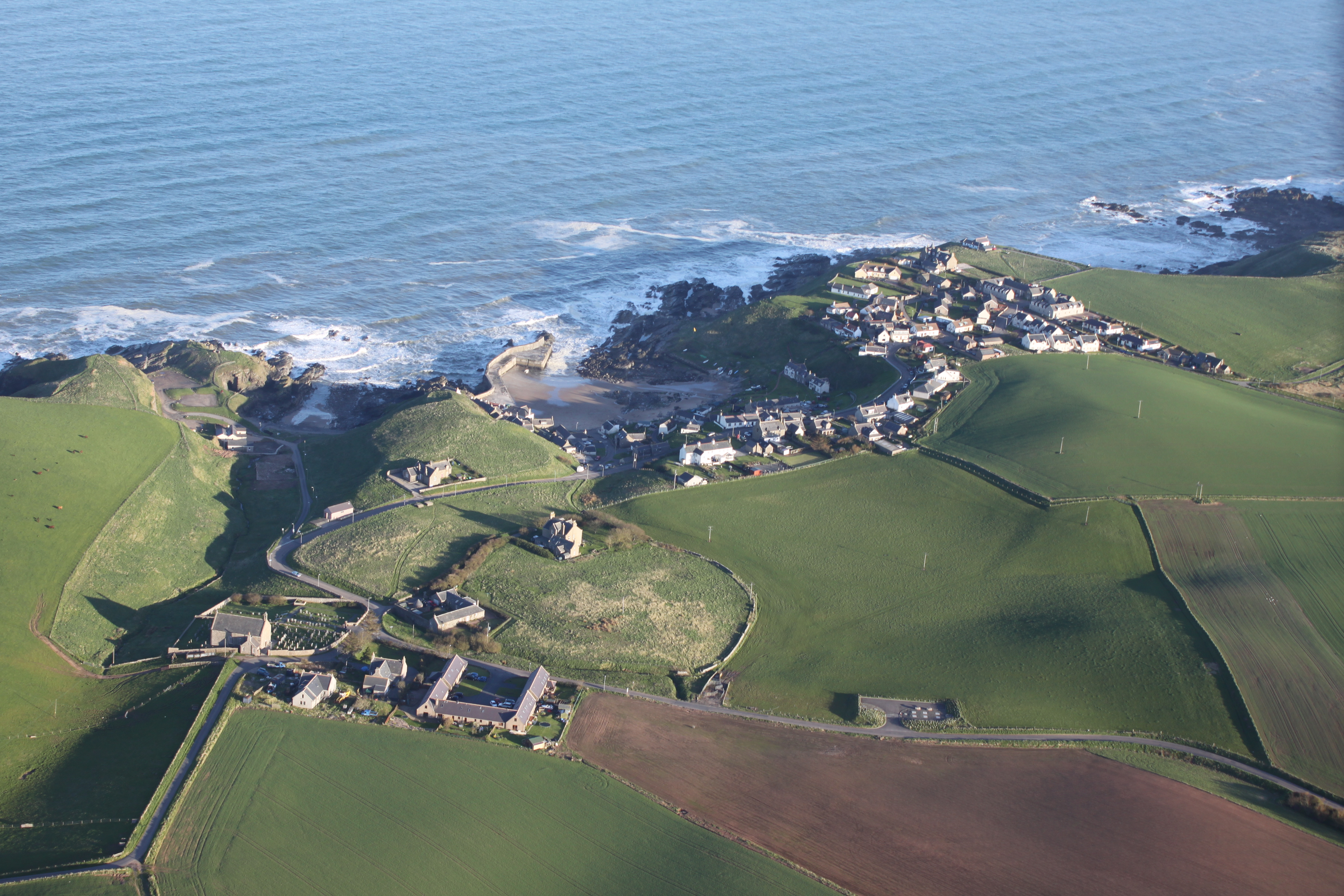
Aerial photograph of Collieston in 2013

Collieston is a small former fishing village on the North Sea coast in Aberdeenshire, Scotland. The village lies just north of the Sands of Forvie Special Protection Area, between Cruden Bay and Newburgh.

== History ==
Local tradition associates Collieston with the arrival of St Ternan, a Columban monk said to have been active in the conversion of the local picts to Christianity. There is, however, evidence that people lived here during much earlier times.

Collieston was established as a fishing village by the 16th century, and it provides the first safe harbour in over fifteen miles of beaches and dunes stretching north from Aberdeen. Fishing for herring, haddock, whiting and cod flourished in the 17th and 18th centuries and formed the foundation of Collieston's economy. The village became known for "Collieston Speldings", salted and sun-dried haddock and whiting, which proved a popular delicacy across Britain. As drift netting developed during the mid-19th century, fishing began to decline and the focus of the industry shifted to places such as Peterhead, as the harbour at Collieston was too small to accommodate the larger boats required.

The numerous sea caves in the nearby cliffs, and small coves with shingle beaches provided ideal terrain for smugglers. In the late 18th century it was estimated by the Excise that up to 8000 gallons of foreign spirits were being illegally landed in the area every month. In 1798, the notorious village smuggler, Phillip Kennedy, was killed by a blow from an exciseman's cutlass. His grave and tombstone still stands in the village graveyard.

A ship from the Spanish Armada, the Santa Caterina, carrying arms for the Earl of Erroll is said to have sunk just off the rocky point of St Catherine's Dub in 1594. In retaliation for the Earl's involvement in the Catholic plot against him, James VI blew up the Earl's castle which stood on the cliffs, a mile north of Collieston. The Earl went on to rebuild Slains Castle, six miles further up the coast, in 1597.

The Annual Reports of the Fishery Board for Scotland provide an insight into the decline in fishing from Collieston in the years before the First World War. The Report for 1900 states that "there is a considerable decrease of men and boats in this creek, the fishermen having migrated to Aberdeen and taken their boats wth them".

Fishery Statistics

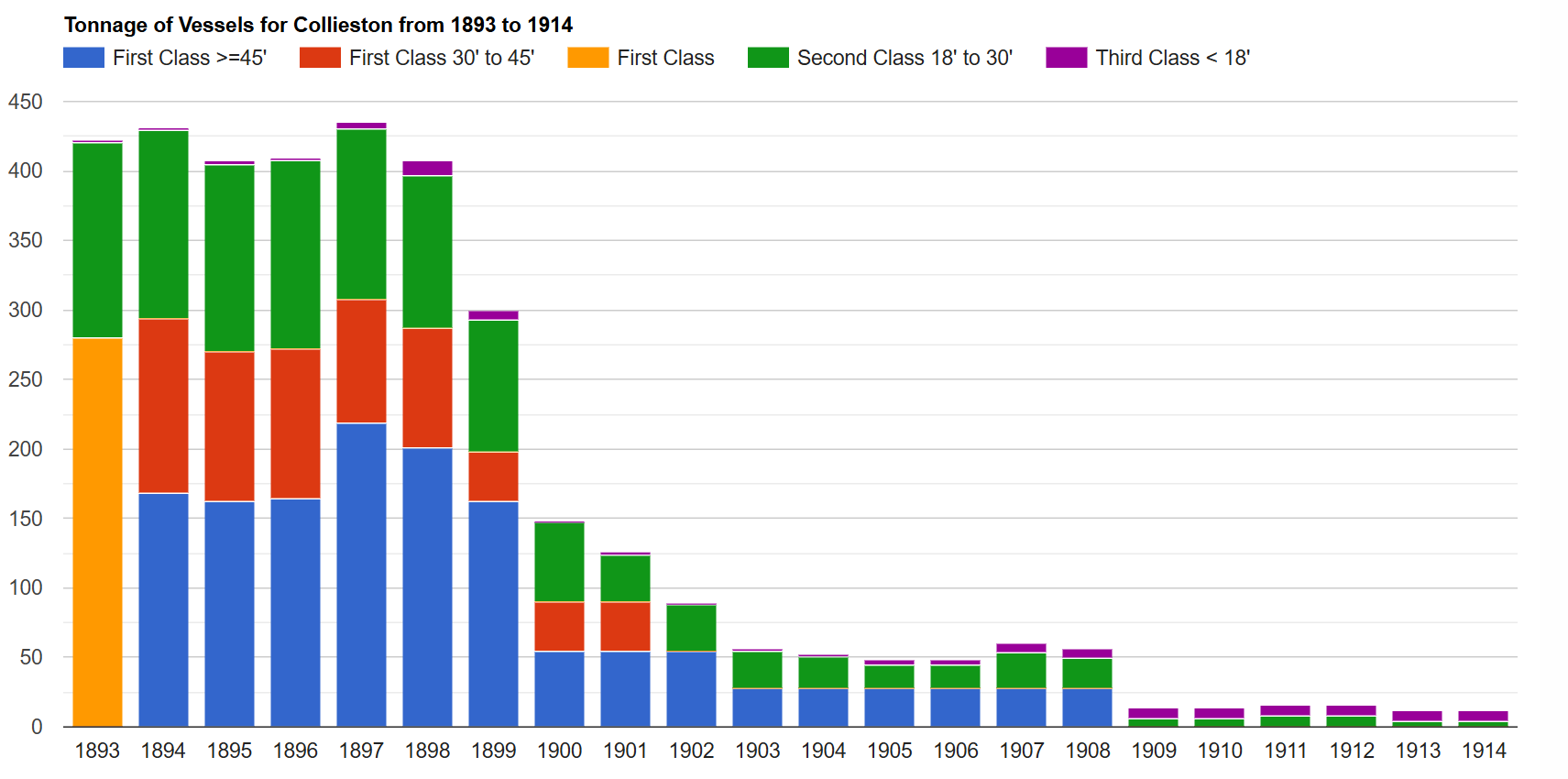
Tonnage of vessels

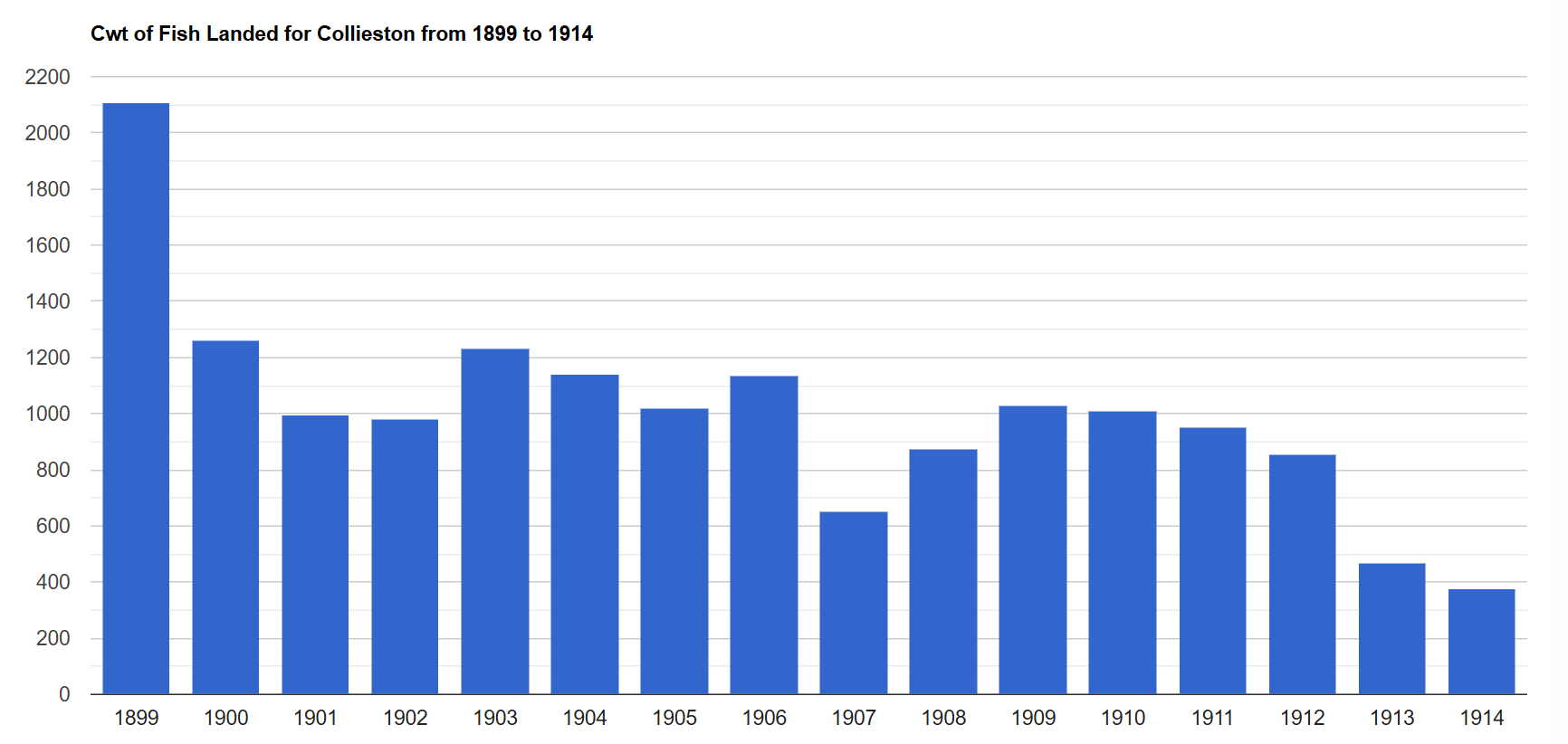
Cwt of fish landed

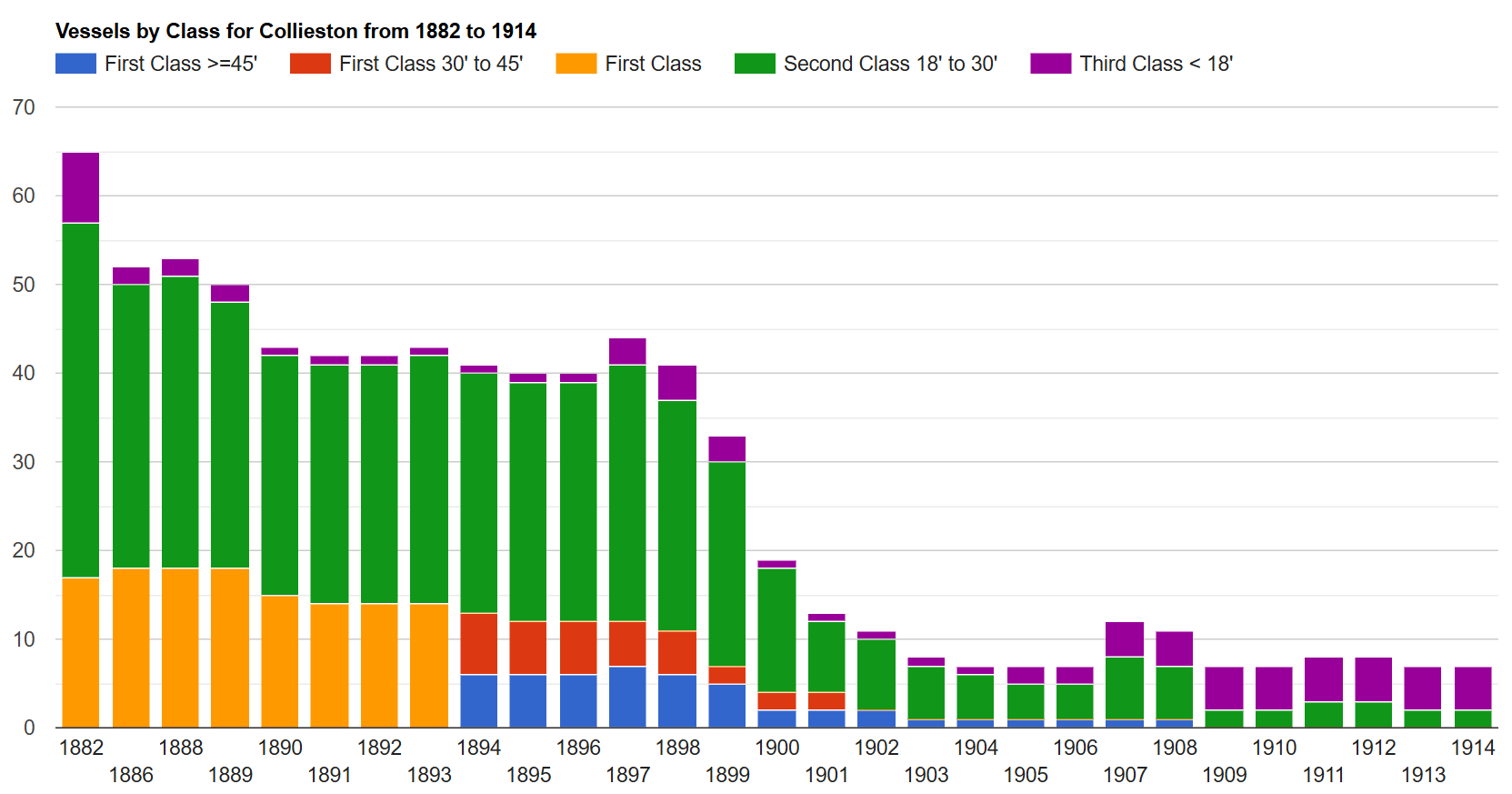
Vessels by class

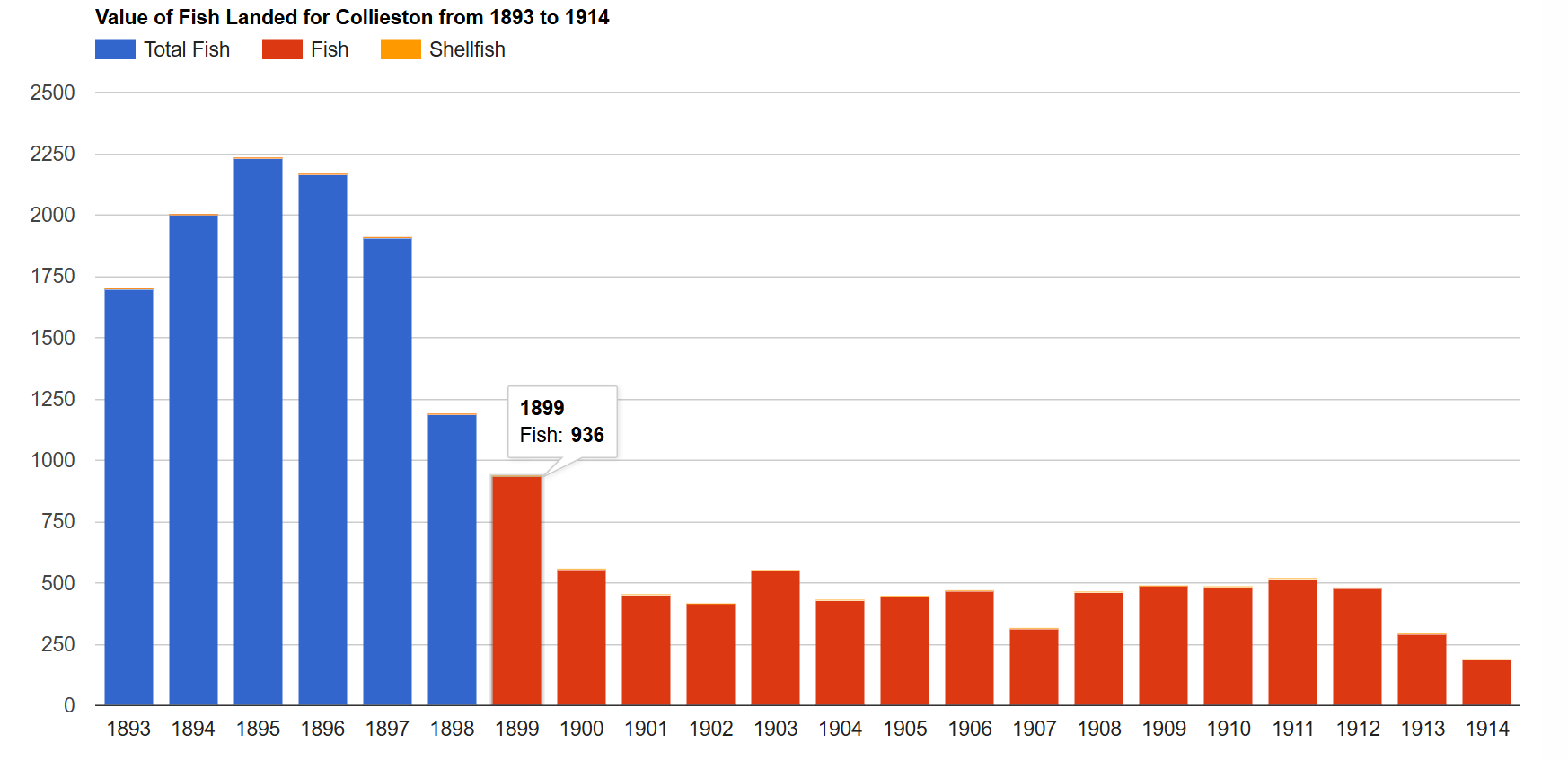
Value (£] of fish landed

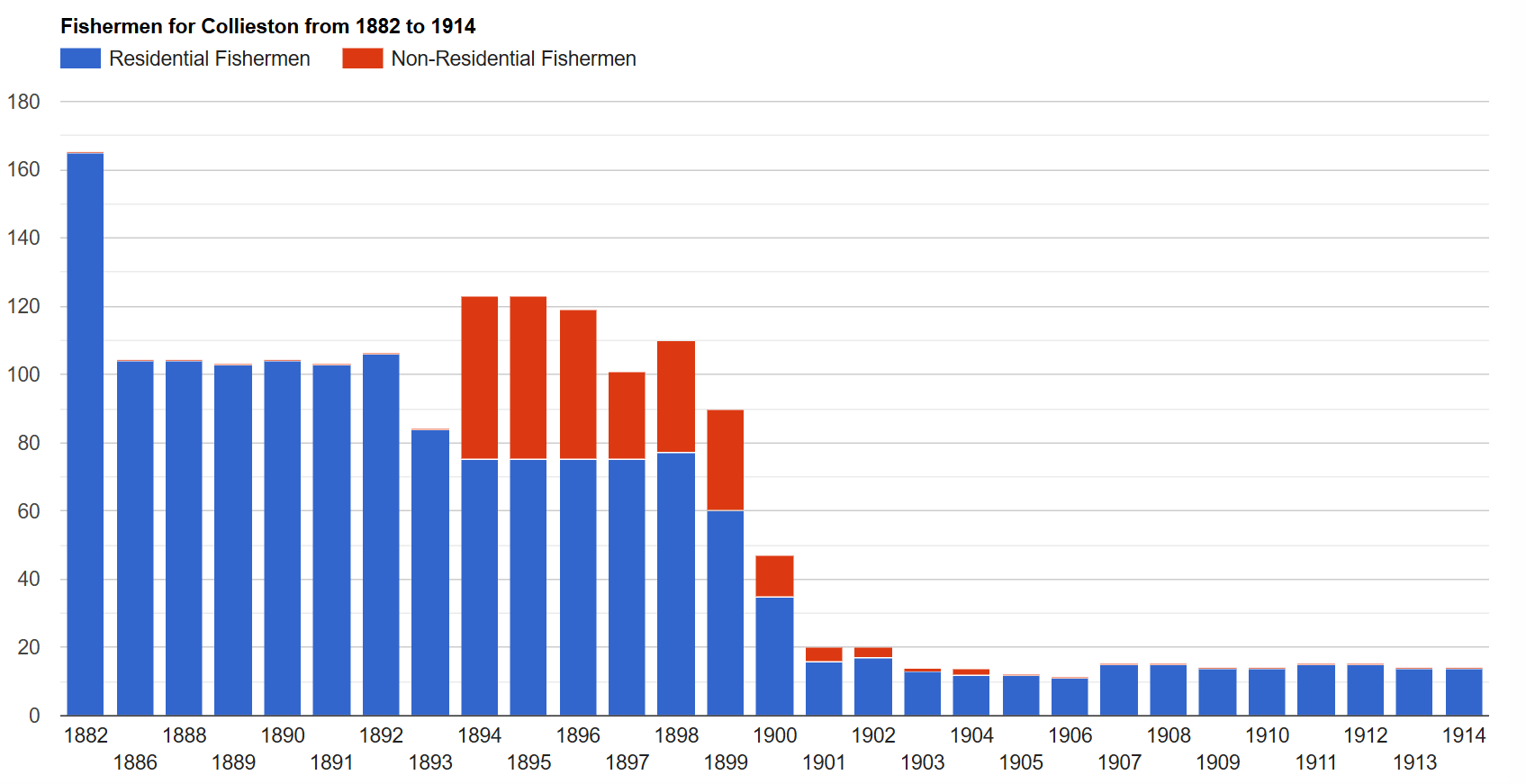
Fishermen

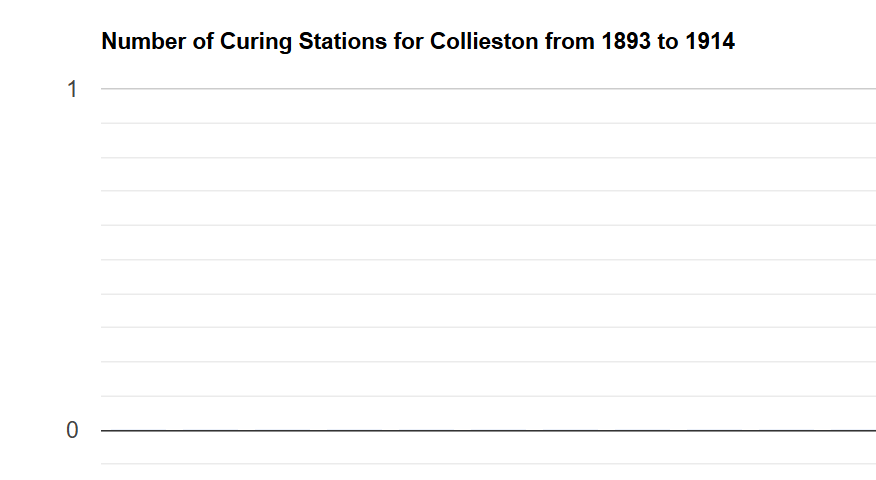
Placeholder - no curing stations

Collieston is now mainly a commuter village serving Aberdeen, and experiences increased tourism during the summer months. In the early 2020s, 4G mobile coverage was introduced to the village as part of a Scottish Government programme to improve connectivity in rural areas. As of 2024, the village had no permanent shop, with residents relying on nearby Ellon for shopping. However, recently 'The Beach Shelter' opened in the old ice cream shop on weekends that has basic supplies such as Milk and Newspapers, they are opened longer during local school holidays.

== Notable people ==
In September 1930, T. E. Lawrence, better known as Lawrence of Arabia, rented a cottage in the village while on leave from the RAF. He referred to the cottage in his writings as "the nearest hovel to the high-tide mark". This cottage still exists, although it has since been modernised and extensively rebuilt.
