= Francis Hay, 9th Earl of Erroll =

Scottish nobleman

The Right Honourable The Earl of Erroll
- Arms of the Earl of Erroll

13th Lord High Constable of Scotland
- In office 1585–1631
- Preceded by: Andrew Hay
- Succeeded by: William Hay

Personal details
- Born: 30 April 1564 Errol, Perthshire, Scotland
- Died: 16 July 1631 (aged 67) Slains, Aberdeen, Scotland
- Spouse(s): Lady Mary Stewart; Lady Margaret Stewart; Lady Elizabeth Douglas
- Children: 13, including William, Anna, and Sophia
- Parent(s): Andrew Hay, 8th Earl of Erroll; Lady Jean Hay

Francis Hay, 9th Earl of Erroll (30 April 1564 – 16 July 1631) was a Scottish nobleman. A convert to Catholicism, he openly conspired with the king of Spain to try to unseat the Protestant Queen Elizabeth.

== Biography ==
He was the son of Andrew Hay, 8th Earl of Erroll by his first wife, Lady Jean Hay, daughter of William Hay, 6th Earl of Erroll. He was the second eldest son, but his older brother Alexander, who was a deaf-mute, was declared "insane" and skipped in the succession. Francis succeeded to the earldom upon the death of his father in 1585.

In 1587 he married Mary Stewart, sister of the Earl of Atholl. She died soon after, and it was alleged he was cruel to her. Her family withheld his dowry money, and her brother took revenge in 1589 when Erroll was declared a rebel.

Early in his life he converted to Roman Catholicism, and as the associate of George Gordon, 1st Marquess of Huntly joined in the Spanish conspiracies against the throne of Queen Elizabeth. In 1589, he began engaging in treasonous correspondence with King Philip II of Spain, who was also briefly King of England by his marriage to Queen Mary.

A letter he wrote to King Philip declaring his allegiance to Spain was intercepted and sent by Elizabeth to James VI. In February 1589, he was ordered to appear in front of the Privy Council. Failing to appear, he was denounced as a rebel.

He engaged with Huntly and Crawford in a rebellion in the north of Scotland, but their forces surrendered at Aberdeen on the arrival of the king in April; and in July, Erroll gave himself up to James, who leniently refrained from exacting any penalty. Erroll submitted himself to the king's mercy at Edzell Castle on 5 August 1589. In September of the same year he entered into a personal bond with Huntly for mutual assistance; and in 1590 displeased the king by marrying, in spite of his prohibition, Lady Elizabeth Douglas, daughter of the William Douglas, 6th Earl of Morton. The marriage was arranged at the initiative of the Master of Glamis, to form a political faction. On 21 April 1590 the Earl of Montrose and others at Megginch Castle tried to persuade him not to marry her, but Erroll argued he could change his wife's friends' alliances.

He was involved in a quarrel with the Earl of Atholl at Perth on 29 June 1591, when Anne of Denmark made a ceremonial entry to the town. Atholl was Provost of Perth and Errol was Constable and they argued over their precedence.

Erroll was imprisoned on suspicion of complicity in the attempt made by Francis Stewart, 5th Earl of Bothwell and Patrick Gray, 6th Lord Gray to surprise the king at Falkland in June 1592; and though he obtained his release, he was again proclaimed a rebel on account of the discovery of his signature to two of the Spanish Blanks, unwritten sheets subscribed with the names of the chief conspirators in a plot for a Spanish invasion of Scotland, to be filled up later with the terms of the projected treaty. After a failure to apprehend him in March 1593, Erroll and his companions were sentenced to abjure Roman Catholicism or leave the kingdom; and on their non-compliance were in 1594 declared traitors.

At Midsummer 1594 the earl hosted his allies the earls of Angus and Huntly at Towie, and there were bonfires and drinking and dancing. The Jesuit James Gordon brought money from the Papal treasury for the rebel earls. On 3 October they defeated at Glenlivet a force sent against them under the Earl of Argyll. His men carried a banner showing a cross and the beheading of Mary, Queen of Scots. Erroll himself was severely wounded by a bullet in the arm and an arrow in the thigh. It was falsely rumoured that he came south to Callendar House, the home of his sister Helenor Hay, Countess of Linlithgow, and died.

Old Slains Castle, his seat, was razed to the ground. The rebel lords left Scotland in 1595, and Erroll, on report of his further conspiracies abroad, was arrested by the states of Zeeland, but was afterwards allowed to escape by Robert Denniston, Conservator of the Scottish Staple. Erroll returned to Scotland secretly in 1596. In March 1597 he was lodged in the Canongate of Edinburgh, and was in the especial favour of Anne of Denmark. On 20 June 1597 he abjured Roman Catholicism and made his peace with the Church of Scotland. He enjoyed the favour of the king, and in 1602 was appointed a commissioner to negotiate the union with England.

A letter from the Privy Council about a pension paid to the Earl of Erroll in January mentions that one of his daughters served Anne of Denmark.

His relations with the Kirk, however, were not so amicable. The reality of his conversion was disputed, and on 21 May 1608 he was confined to the city of Perth for the better resolution of his doubts, being subsequently declared an obstinate "papist", excommunicated, deprived of his estate, and imprisoned at Dumbarton; and after some further vacillation was finally released in May 1611.

The dispute which began in his lifetime concerning the hereditary office of Lord High Constable between the families of Erroll and of the Earls Marischal was settled finally in favour of the former; thus establishing the precedence enjoyed by the earls of Erroll next after the royal family over all other subjects in Scotland.

== Marriage and issue ==
He married:

1. Mary, daughter of John Stewart, 4th Earl of Atholl and Margaret Fleming, in 1587
2. Margaret, daughter of James Stewart, Earl of Moray
3. Elizabeth, daughter of William Douglas, 6th Earl of Morton

By his third wife Elizabeth Douglas he had five sons and eight daughters:

1. William, 10th Earl of Erroll
2. George
3. Francis
4. Thomas
5. Lewis
6. Anna, married George Seton, 3rd Earl of Winton
7. Jean, married John Erskine, Earl of Mar
8. Mary, married Walter Scott, 1st Earl of Buccleuch
9. Elizabeth, married Hugh Sempill, 5th Lord Sempill; secondly; James Douglas, 1st Lord Mordington
10. Sophia Hay, who married John, Viscount Melgum, son of George Gordon, 1st Marquess of Huntly
11. Margaret, married John Seton, son of Sir John Seton of Barns
12. Isabel, died unmarried
13. Helen (died 1625, aged 10)

The earl died on 16 July 1631, and was buried in the church of Slains. The poet Arthur Johnston composed a poem in Latin for his funeral.

== Descendants of note ==
- Earl W. Bascom (1906–1995), American-Canadian rodeo champion, inventor, "father of modern rodeo", hall of fame inductee, Hollywood actor, cowboy artist and sculptor
- Wilford Brimley (born 1934), American actor in Hollywood film and television, rancher

== See also ==
- Alexander Burnett of Leys (died 1619)
- Muchalls Castle

Military offices
Preceded by Andrew Hay	Lord High Constable of Scotland; 1585–1631	Succeeded by William Hay
Peerage of Scotland
Preceded by Andrew Hay	Earl of Erroll; 1585–1631	Succeeded by William Hay
