= Dionysius of Halicarnassus =

1st-century BC Greek historian and teacher

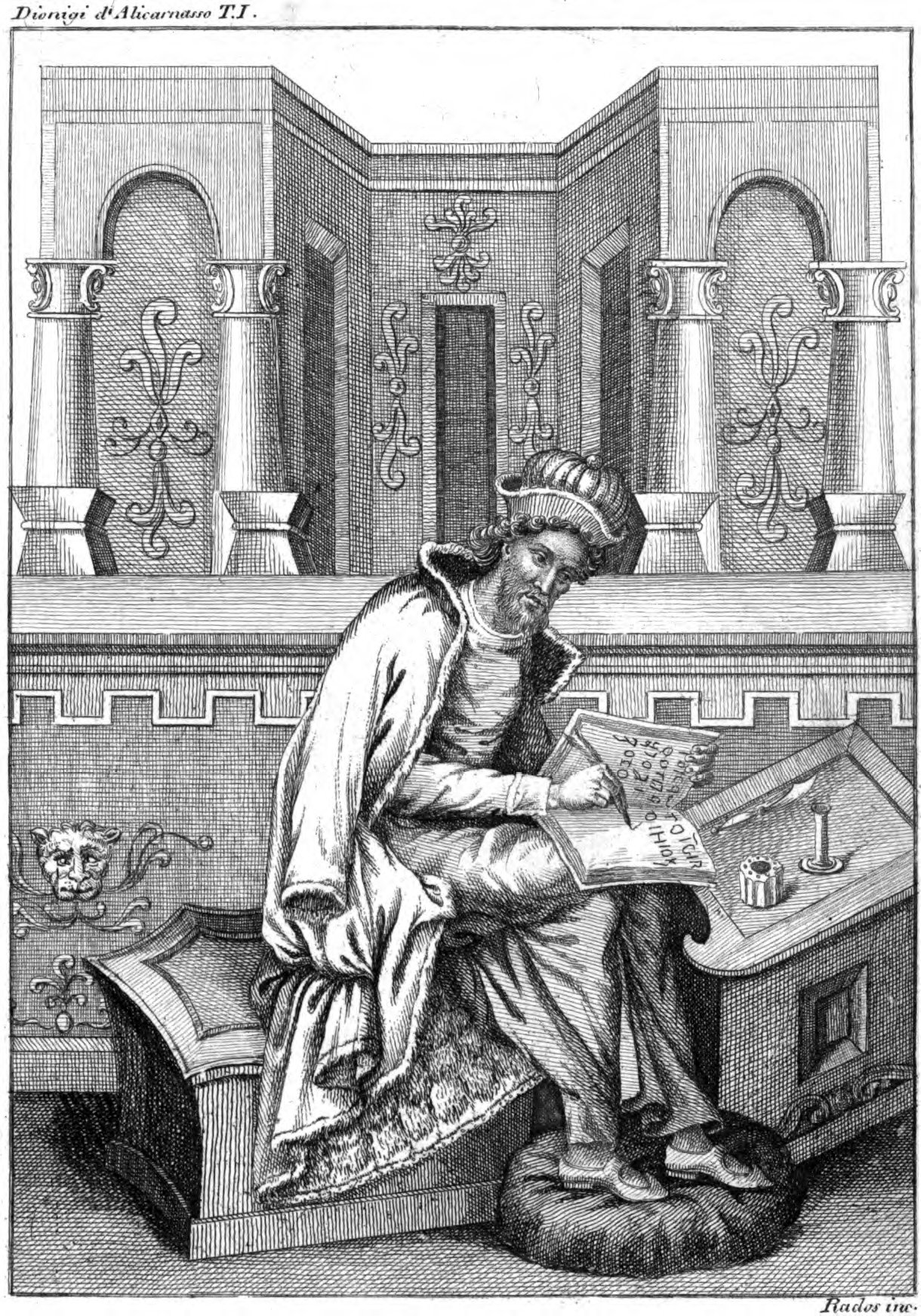
- An image of Dionysius of Halicarnassus from the Codices Ambrosiani.
- Born: c. 60 BC; Halicarnassus, Asia, Roman Republic (now Bodrum, Muğla, Turkey)
- Died: c. 7 BC (aged around 53); Rome, Roman Empire (now Rome, Italy)
- Citizenship: Roman
- Occupations: Historian; Rhetoric; Writer
- Notable work: Roman Antiquities

Dionysius of Halicarnassus (Ancient Greek: Διονύσιος Ἀλεξάνδρου Ἁλικαρνασσεύς, Dionýsios Alexándrou Halikarnasseús, ''Dionysios (son of Alexandros) of Halikarnassos''; c. 60 BC – after 7 BC) was a Greek historian and teacher of rhetoric, who flourished during the reign of Emperor Augustus. His literary style was atticistic – imitating Classical Attic Greek in its prime.

He is known for his work Rhōmaikē Archaiologia (Roman Antiquities), which describes the history of Rome from its beginnings until the outbreak of the First Punic War in 264 BC. Out of twenty books, only the first nine have survived. Dionysius's opinion of the necessity of a promotion of paideia within education, from true knowledge of classical sources, endured for centuries in a form integral to the identity of the Greek elite.

== Life ==
He was a Halicarnassian. At some time after the end of the civil wars he moved to Rome, and spent twenty-two years studying Latin and literature and preparing materials for his history. During this period, he gave lessons in rhetoric, and enjoyed the society of many distinguished men. The date of his death is unknown. In the 19th century, it was commonly supposed that he was the ancestor of Aelius Dionysius of Halicarnassus.

== Works ==
=== Roman Antiquities ===
His major work, entitled Roman Antiquities (Ancient Greek: Ῥωμαϊκὴ Ἀρχαιολογία, Rhōmaikē Archaiologia), frequently abbreviated Ant. Rom. (Latin: Antiquitates Romanae), narrates the history of Rome from the mythical period to the beginning of the First Punic War in twenty books, of which the first nine remain extant while the remaining books only exist as fragments, in the excerpts of the Roman emperor Constantine VII Porphyrogenitus and an epitome discovered by Angelo Mai in a Milan manuscript. Dionysius is the first major historian of early Roman history whose work is now extant. Several other ancient historians who wrote of this period, almost certainly used Dionysius as a source for their material. The works of Appian, Plutarch and Livy all describe similar people and events of Early Rome as Dionysius.

In the preamble to Book I, Dionysius states that the Greek people lack basic information on Roman history, a deficiency he hopes to fix with the present work.

Book I (1300?)–753 BC
Mythic early history of Italy and its people. Book I also narrates the history of Aeneas and his progeny as well as Dionysius's telling of the Romulus and Remus myth, ending with the death of Remus.

Book II 753–673 BC
The Roman monarchy's first two Kings, Romulus and Numa Pompilius. Romulus formulates customs and laws for Rome. Sabine war: as in subsequent parts of the history, this early conflict is described as involving numerous categories of officer, thousands of infantry, and cavalry combatants. This is highly unlikely, but is a common anachronism found in ancient historians.

Book III 673–575 BC
Kings Tullus Hostilius through Lucius Tarquinius Priscus.

Book IV 575–509 BC
Last of the Roman kings and end of the monarchy with overthrow of Lucius Tarquinius Superbus.

Book V 509-497 BC
Start of Roman Republic and Consular years.

Book VI 496–493 BC
Includes the first instance of Plebeian secession.

Book VII 492–490 BC
This book describes at length the background leading to the Roman Coriolanus' trial, ending in his exile. Much of the book is a debate between supporters of the oligarchy and the plebeians.

Book VIII 489–482 BC
Coriolanus, now exiled, allies with Rome's current primary enemy, the Volscians. Coriolanus leads the Volscian army on a successful campaign against Roman allies and finally is near to capturing Rome itself. Coriolanus' mother intercedes for the Roman state and manages to end the military campaign. Coriolanus then is treacherously murdered by the Volscians. The remaining part of the book covers the military campaigns to recover land from the Volscians.

Book IX 481–462 BC
Various military campaigns of mixed fortune in foreign matters. Domestically the plebeians and patricians argue and the conflict of the orders continues. The number of Tribunes is raised from 5 to 10. Book IX ends with the first two years of the decemvirate and the creation of the first Roman Law Tables.

Book X 461–449 BC
The decemvirate continued.

Note
The last ten books are fragmentary, based on excerpts from medieval Byzantine history compilations. Book XI is mostly extant at around 50 pages (Aeterna Press, 2015 edition), while the remaining books, have only 12–14 pages per book.

Book XI 449–443 BC
fragments

Book XII 442–396 BC
fragments

Book XIII 394–390 BC
fragments

Book XIV 390 BC
Gauls sack of Rome.

Book XV
First and Second Samnite War.

Book XVI–XVII
Third Samnite War.

Book XIX
The beginnings of conflicts between Rome and the warlord Pyrrhus of Epirus. Threatened by Roman expansion into southern Italy, the city of Tarentum asks Pyrrhus to protect them.

Book XX
Roman-Pyrrhic War, with Pyrrhus's second invasion of Italy.

Because his prime objective was to reconcile the Greeks to Roman rule, Dionysius focused on the good qualities of their conquerors, and also argued that – based on sources ancient in his own time – the Romans were genuine descendants of the older Greeks. According to him, history is philosophy teaching by examples, and this idea he has carried out from the point of view of a Greek rhetorician. But he carefully consulted the best authorities, and his work and that of Livy are the only connected and detailed extant accounts of early Roman history.

=== Other works ===
Dionysius was also the author of several rhetorical treatises, in which he shows that he had thoroughly studied the best Attic models:

The Art of Rhetoric (Τέχνη ῥητορική, Tékhnē rhētorikḗ: a collection of essays on the theory of rhetoric, incomplete, and certainly not all his work;
The Arrangement of Words (Περὶ συνθέσεως ὀνομάτων, Perì sunthéseōs onomátōn, Latin: De compositione verborum): on the combination of words according to the different styles of oratory;
On Imitation (Περὶ μιμήσεως, Perì mimḗseōs): on the best models in the different kinds of literature and the way in which they are to be imitated—a fragmentary work;
Commentaries on the Attic Orators (Περὶ τῶν Ἀττικῶν ῥητόρων, Perì tôn Attikôn rhētórōn: which covers Lysias, Isaeus, Isocrates, and by way of supplement, Dinarchus;
On the Admirable Style of Demosthenes (Περὶ λεκτικῆς Δημοσθένους δεινότητος, Perì lektikês Dēmosthénous deinótētos)
On the Character of Thucydides (Περὶ Θουκιδίδου χαρακτῆρος, Perì Thoukidídou kharaktêros)

The last two treatises are supplemented by letters to Gn. Pompeius and Ammaeus (two, one of which is about Thucydides).

=== Dionysian imitatio ===
Dionysian imitatio is the literary method of imitation as formulated by Dionysius, who conceived it as the rhetorical practice of emulating, adapting, reworking, and enriching a source text by an earlier author. It shows marked similarities with Quintilian's view of imitation, and both may derive from a common source.

Dionysius's concept marked a significant departure from the concept of mimesis formulated by Aristotle in the 4th century BC, which was only concerned with "imitation of nature" and not "imitation of other authors." Latin orators and rhetoricians adopted Dionysius' method of imitatio and discarded Aristotle's mimesis.

== History in the Roman Antiquities, and the Foundation Myth ==
Dionysius carried out extensive research for his Roman history, selecting among authorities, and preserving (for example) details of the Servian Census.

His first two books present a unified account of the supposed Greek origin for Rome, merging a variety of sources into a firm narrative: his success, however, was at the expense of concealing the primitive Roman actuality (as revealed by archaeology). Along with Livy, Dionysius is thus one of the primary sources for the accounts of the Roman foundation myth, and that of Romulus and Remus, and was relied on in the later publications of Plutarch, for example. He writes extensively on the myth, sometimes attributing direct quotations to its figures. The myth spans the first two volumes of his Roman Antiquities, beginning with Book I chapter 73 and concluding in Book II chapter 56.

=== Romulus and Remus ===
==== Origins and survival in the wild ====
Dionysius claims that the twins, Romulus and Remus, were born to a vestal named Ilia Silvia (sometimes called Rea), descended from Aeneas of Troy and the daughter of King Latinus of the Original Latin tribes, thus linking Rome to Trojans and Latins both. Dionysius lays out the different accounts of her pregnancy and the twins' conception, but declines to choose one over the others.

Citing Fabius, Cincius, Porcius Cato, and Piso, Dionysius recounts the most common tale, whereby the twins are to be tossed into the Tiber; are left at the site of the ficus Ruminalis; and rescued by a she-wolf who nurses them in front of her lair (the Lupercal) before being adopted by Faustulus. Dionysius relates an alternate, "non-fantastical" version of Romulus and Remus' birth, survival and youth. In this version, Numitor managed to switch the twins at birth with two other infants. The twins were delivered by their grandfather to Faustulus to be fostered by him and his wife, Laurentia, a former prostitute. According to Plutarch, lupa (Latin for "wolf") was a common term for members of her profession and this gave rise to the she-wolf legend.

==== Falling out and Foundation of Rome ====
The twins receive a proper education in the city of Gabii, before eventually winning control of the area around where Rome would be founded. Dispute over the particular hill upon which Rome should be built, the Palatine Hill or the Aventine Hill for its strategic advantages saw the brothers fall out and Remus killed.

When the time came to actually construct the city of Rome, the two brothers disputed over the particular hill upon which Rome should be built, Romulus favoring the Palatine Hill and Remus favoring what later came to be known as Remoria (possibly the Aventine Hill). Eventually, the two deferred their decision to the gods at the advice of their grandfather. Using the birds as omens, the two brothers decided "he to whom the more favourable birds first appeared should rule the colony and be its leader." Since Remus saw nine vultures first, he claimed that the gods chose him and Romulus claimed that since he saw a greater (the "more favorable") number of vultures, the gods chose him. Unable to reach a conclusion, the two brothers and their followers fought, ultimately resulting in the death of Remus. After his brother's death, a saddened Romulus buried Remus at the site of Remoria, giving the location its namesake.

Before the actual construction of the city began, Romulus made sacrifices and received good omens, and he then ordered the populace to ritually atone for their guilt. The city's fortifications were first and then housing for the populace. He assembled the people and gave them the choice as to what type of government they wanted - monarchy, democracy, or oligarchy - for its constitution. After his address, which extolled bravery in war abroad and moderation at home, and in which Romulus denied any need to remain in power, the people decided to remain a kingdom and asked him to remain its king. Before accepting he looked for a sign of the approval of the gods. He prayed and witnessed an auspicious lightning bolt, after which he declared that no king shall take the throne without receiving approval from the gods.

==== Institutions ====
Dionysus then provided a detailed account of the 'Romulus' constitution, most probably based on the work of Terentius Varro. Romulus supposedly divides Rome into 3 tribes, each with a Tribune in charge. Each tribe was divided into 10 curiae, and each of those into smaller units. He divided the kingdom's land holdings between them, and Dionysus alone among our authorities insists that this was done in equal lots. The Patrician class was separated from the Plebeian class; while each curia was responsible for providing soldiers in the event of war.

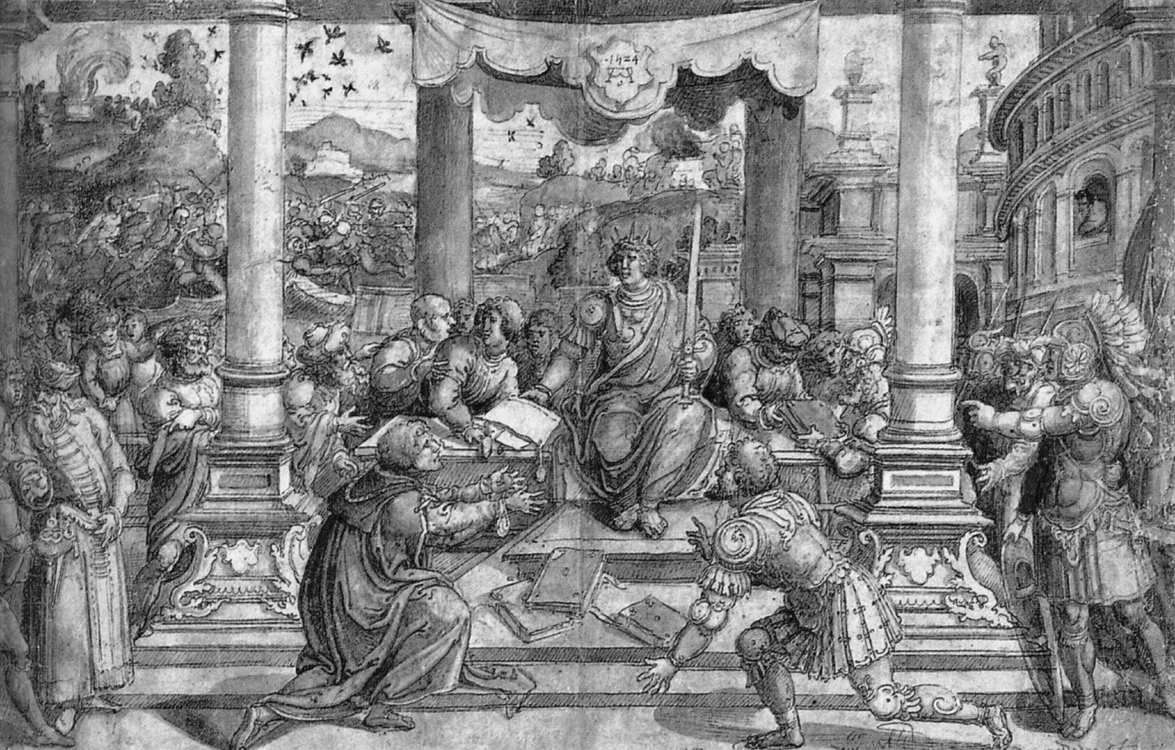
Bernard van Orley, Romulus Gives Laws to the Roman People – WGA16696

A system of patronage (clientela), the Roman Senate (attributed by Dionysius to Greek influence) and a personal bodyguard of 300 of the strongest and fittest among the nobles were also established: the latter, the celeres, were so-named either for their quickness, or, according to Valerius Antias, for their commander.

A separation of power and measures to increase manpower were also instituted, as were Rome's religious customs and practices, and a variety of legal measures praised by Dionysius.

Again, Dionysius thoroughly describes the laws of other nations before contrasting the approach of Romulus and lauding his work. The Roman law governing marriage is, according to his Antiquities, an elegant yet simple improvement over that of other nations, most of which he harshly derides. By declaring that wives would share equally in the possessions and conduct of their husband, Romulus promoted virtue in the former and deterred mistreatment by the latter. Wives could inherit upon their husband's death. A wife's adultery was a serious crime, however, drunkenness could be a mitigating factor in determining the appropriate punishment. Because of Romulus' laws, Dionysius claims that not a single Roman couple divorced over the following five centuries.

Romulus' laws governing parental rights, in particular, those that allow fathers to maintain power over their adult children were also considered an improvement over those of others; while Dionysius further approved of how, under the laws of Romulus, native-born free Romans were limited to two forms of employment: farming and the army. All other occupations were filled by slaves or non-Roman labor.

Romulus used the trappings of his office to encourage compliance with the law. His court was imposing and filled with loyal soldiers and he was always accompanied by the 12 lictors appointed to be his attendants.

==== The Rape of the Sabine Women and death of Romulus ====
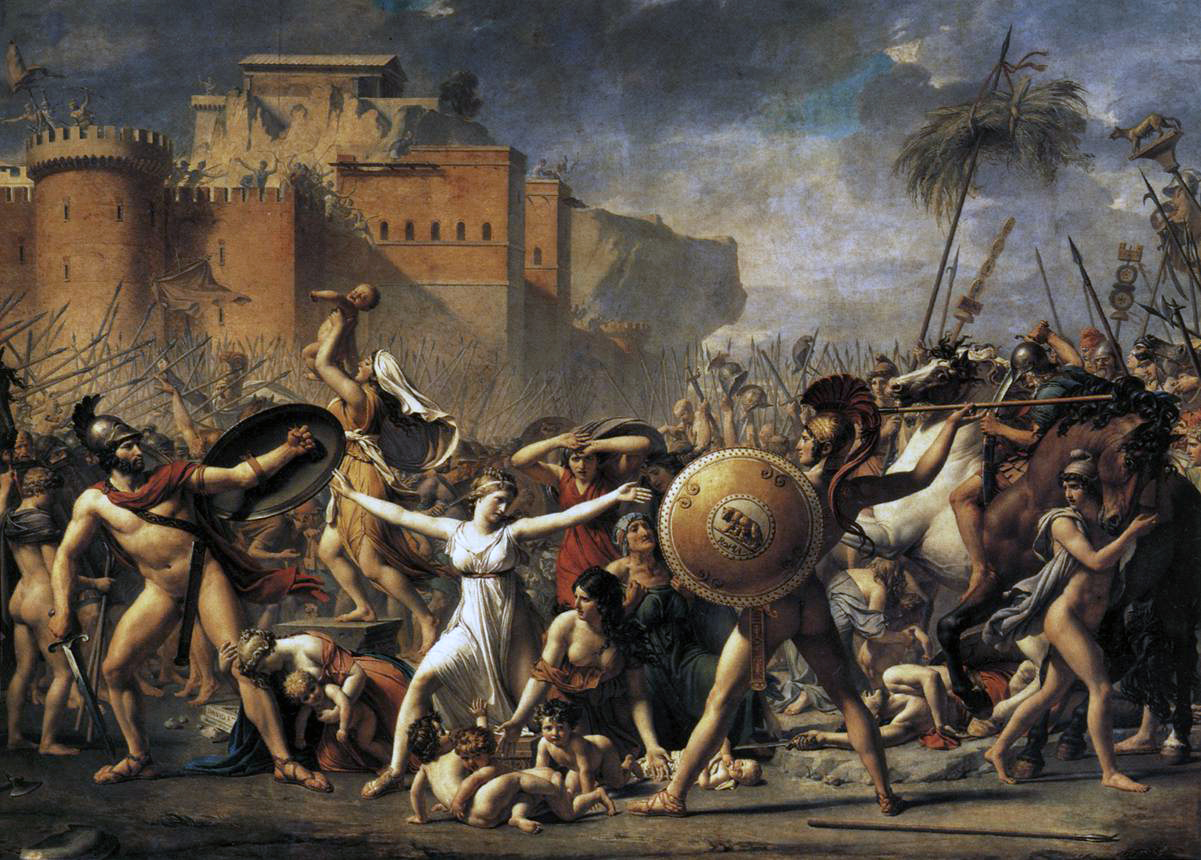
The Intervention of the Sabine Women, by Jacques-Louis David, 1799

Following his institutional account, Dionysus described the famous abducting of the Sabine women and suggesting thereby that the abduction was a pretext for alliance with the Sabines. Romulus wished to cement relations with neighboring cities through intermarriage, but none of them found the fledgling city of Rome worthy of their daughters. To overcome this, Romulus arranged a festival in honor of Neptune (the Consualia) and invited the surrounding cities to attend. At the end of the festival, Romulus and the young men seized all the virgins at the festival and planned to marry them according to their customs. In his narrative, however, the cities of Caecina, Crustumerium, and Antemnae petition for Tatius, king of the Sabines to lead them to war; and it is only after the famous intervention of the Sabine women that the nations agreed to become a single kingdom under the joint rule of Romulus and Tatius, both declared Quirites.

After the death of Tatius, however, Romulus became more dictatorial, until he met his end, either through actions divine or earthly. One tale tells of a "darkness" that took Romulus from his war camp to his father in heaven. Another source claims that Romulus was killed by his Roman countrymen after releasing hostages, showing favoritism, and excessive cruelty in his punishments.

== Impact ==
It is widely accepted that Josephus's Antiquities of the Jews was influenced by Dionysius's Roman Antiquities. In recent years, this view has been contested by several scholars.

== Editions ==
- Collected Works edited by Friedrich Sylburg (1536–1596) (parallel Greek and Latin) (Frankfurt 1586) (available at Google Books)
- Complete edition by Johann Jakob Reiske (1774–1777)
- Archaeologia by A. Kiessling (1860-1870) (vol. 1, vol. 2, vol. 3, vol. 4) and V. Prou (1886) and C. Jacoby (1885–1925) (vol. 1, vol. 2, vol. 3, vol. 4, supplementum)
- Opuscula by Hermann Usener and Ludwig Radermacher (1899-1929) in the Teubner series (vol. 1 contains Commentaries on the Attic Orators, Letter to Ammaeus, On the Admirable Style of Demosthenes, On the Character of Thucydides, Letter to Ammaeus about Thucydides, vol. 2 contains The Arrangement of Words, On Imitation, Letter to Gn. Pompeius, The Art of Rhetoric, Fragments)
- Roman Antiquities by V. Fromentin and J. H. Sautel (1998–), and Opuscula rhetorica by Aujac (1978–), in the Collection Budé
- English translation by Edward Spelman (1758) (available at Google Books)
- Trans. Earnest Cary, Harvard University Press, Loeb Classical Library:
  - Roman Antiquities, I, 1937.
  - Roman Antiquities, II, 1939.
  - Roman Antiquities, III, 1940.
  - Roman Antiquities, IV, 1943.
  - Roman Antiquities, V, 1945.
  - Roman Antiquities, VI, 1947.
  - Roman Antiquities, VII, 1950.
- Trans. Stephen Usher, Critical Essays, I, Harvard University Press, 1974, ISBN 978-0-674-99512-3
- Trans. Stephen Usher, Critical Essays, II, Harvard University Press, 1985, ISBN 978-0-674-99513-0

== See also ==
- Diodorus Siculus
- Historic recurrence
