= William King (academic) =

English academic and writer (1685–1763)

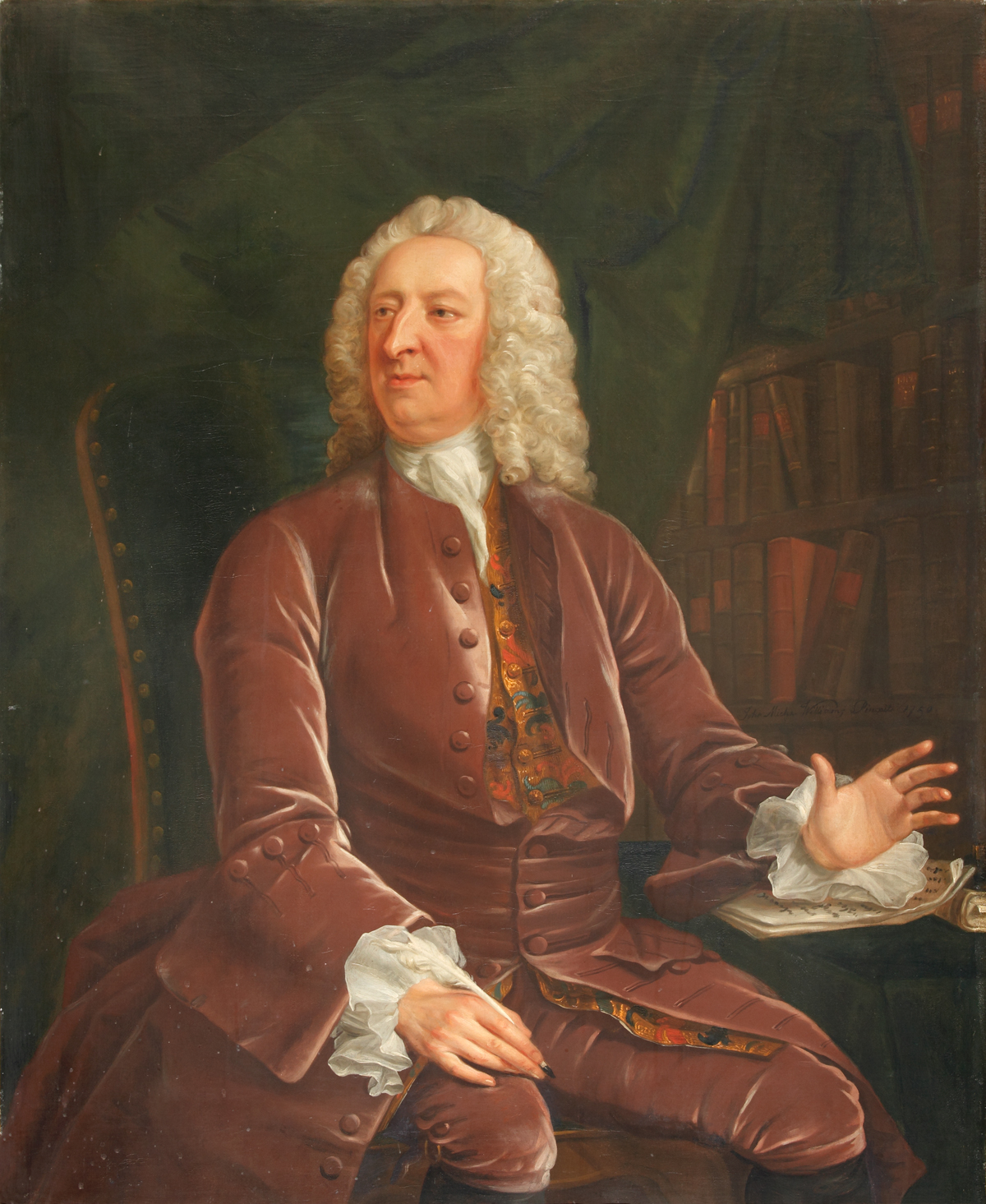
- 1750 portrait by John Michael Williams
- Born: 16 March 1685; London, Middlesex, England
- Died: 30 December 1763 (aged 78); Cookham, England, Great Britain
- Education: Balliol College, Oxford
- Children: 1 son and daughter

William King (16 March 1685 – 30 December 1763) was an English academic and writer, Principal of St Mary Hall, Oxford from 1719, He was known for strongly held Jacobite views, and as a satirist and poet.

== Early life ==
Born at Stepney, Middlesex, on 16 March 1685, he was the son of the Rev. Peregrine King and Margaret, daughter of Sir William Smyth, bart., of Radclive, Buckinghamshire. After attending Salisbury grammar school he entered Balliol College, Oxford, on 9 July 1701, and graduated B.C.L. on 12 July 1709, D.C.L. on 8 July 1715. He was called to the bar at Gray's Inn in 1712, and admitted a civilian on 20 January 1716, but having a private income, he never sought legal practice.

== Jacobite don ==
King devoted his life to scholarship and literature, interested himself in politics, and was long recognised the head of the Jacobite party at Oxford. Politically he was a close associate of Sir John Hynde Cotton, 3rd Baronet. His views are now seen as directed to his contemporary dislikes, rather than being retrospective. He looked to gain attention to them by shock tactics.

For a time King acted as secretary to the Duke of Ormonde and the Earl of Arran, when they were Chancellor of the University of Oxford, and he was elected principal of St Mary Hall in 1719. He resigned his secretaryship in 1722, when he stood for the parliamentary representation of the university, but was easily defeated by George Clarke. St Mary Hall had few students, but one who was influenced by King was Sanderson Miller.

A lawsuit about an estate in Galway brought King to Ireland in 1727. Jonathan Swift thought well of him. In January 1739 Swift entrusted King with a copy of the verses on his own death, for publication in London. King, alarmed at the satire on Robert Walpole and Queen Caroline, omitted more than a hundred lines, "in deference", he said, "to the judgment of Pope and other friends of Swift's", but to Swift's annoyance. King excused himself in letters to Swift, but the Dublin version printed of the verses is believed to have restored essentially the original version. During the same year King met Nathaniel Hooke at Dr. George Cheyne's house at Bath, Somerset, and acted as his amanuensis while he was translating Andrew Michael Ramsay's Travels of Cyrus.

Early in 1746 William Lauder, later exposed as a literary forger, travelled south from Scotland, and King welcomed him in Oxford, approving of his politics. The group of scholars who subsequently demonstrated Lauder's bad faith included Roger Watkins, vice-principal of St Mary Hall. He with others (Robert Thyer and Thomas Newton, as well as John Bowle who already was a public critic of Lauder) therefore proceeded carefully to gather evidence. In the end John Douglas put together a full case, but did not go public in late 1750 without consulting King.

King was presented to the Stuart Pretender Charles Edward Stuart in September 1750. The Pretender was then paying a stealthy visit to England, and drank tea one evening at the doctor's lodgings at Oxford. They subsequently corresponded, but King came to dislike him. King took part in the contested election for Oxfordshire in 1754, and was in consequence vigorously libelled. He was accused of having defrauded subscribers for books never published to the extent of £1,500, was taunted with having offered himself to sale both in England and Ireland, and was accused of inspiring the Jacobite London Evening Post. In February 1755 King took Samuel Johnson his diploma of M.A., and found in him an admirer of his scholarship and politics.

== Later life ==
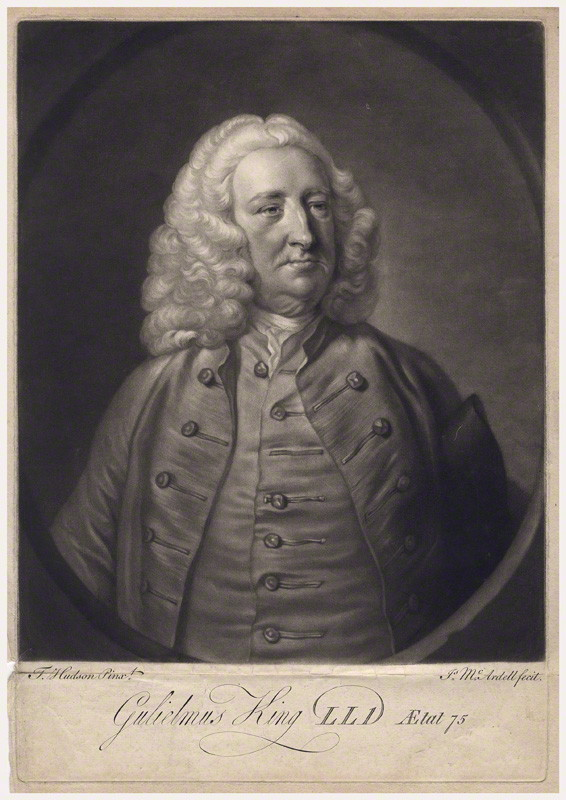
William King, 1760 engraving by Thomas Hudson

King publicly severed his connection with the Jacobite party in 1761. He accompanied a deputation from the university to present George III with an address of congratulation on his marriage. He was personally introduced to the king by Lord Shelburne.

King died on 30 December 1763, and was buried on 5 January 1764 at Ealing, Middlesex. where he had resided for many years on an estate called Newby, near the church. He was also lessee of the rectory of Ealing. Throughout his life he was a water-drinker. His heart, having been enclosed in a silver urn, was deposited by his own directions in the chapel of St Mary Hall, where there is a monument to his memory, with a Latin epitaph written by himself.

== Orator ==
Much of King's contemporary fame was as an incendiary orator. He was provocative and sought controversy. When honorary degrees were conferred on the Duke of Hamilton, Lord Lichfield and Lord Orrery at Oxford in 1743, King delivered the Latin speeches, published as Tres Oratiunculæ habitæ in Domo Convocationis Oxon. (1743). The preface implied that he had been attacked by some anti-Jacobite canon. To keep up public interest in the affair, King himself wrote Epistola Objurgatoria ad Guilielmum King, LL.D., London, 1744, to which is attached a doggerel Epistola Canonici reverendi admodùm ad Archidiaconum reverendum admodùm. Lastly appeared A Letter to a Friend occasioned by Epistola Objurgatoria, &c., by S. P. Y. B., London, 1744; the writer claimed to have been wrongly credited with the authorship of the Epistola. King probably created the whole controversy.

At the opening of the Radcliffe Camera, on 13 April 1749, King delivered a Latin speech in the Sheldonian Theatre. In it he expressed his Jacobitism: he introduced six times the word redeat ("that he may return"), pausing each time, amid loud applause. Thomas Warton, in his poem The Triumph of Isis, eulogised King's powers of oratory. In praising the trustees of the library, King was complimenting Jacobites among them: the Duke of Beaufort, Sir Walter Wagstaffe Bagot, and Sir Watkin Williams-Wynn. But one view is that the protest was no longer dynastic, being concerned with the Whig handling of the Church. The audience included key supporters of the Hanoverian heir Frederick, Prince of Wales, who found also some signs of the Tory ground shifting. Be that as it may, Jacobite propagandists lapped up King's themes, the invocation of Astraea in Virgil's terms of return, and the slogan "Redeat Magnus Ille Genius Britanniae" was adopted for use on the medallion marking the 1752 English covert visit of the Pretender.

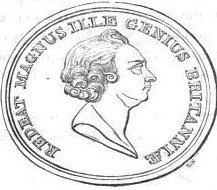
Jacobite medal with inscription Redeat Magnus Ille Genius Britanniæ

On the Earl of Arran's death the Jacobite Earl of Westmoreland was elected chancellor of Oxford. At his installation on 7 July 1759 King made a speech, at which Johnson "clapped his hands till they were sore", according to Boswell's Life.

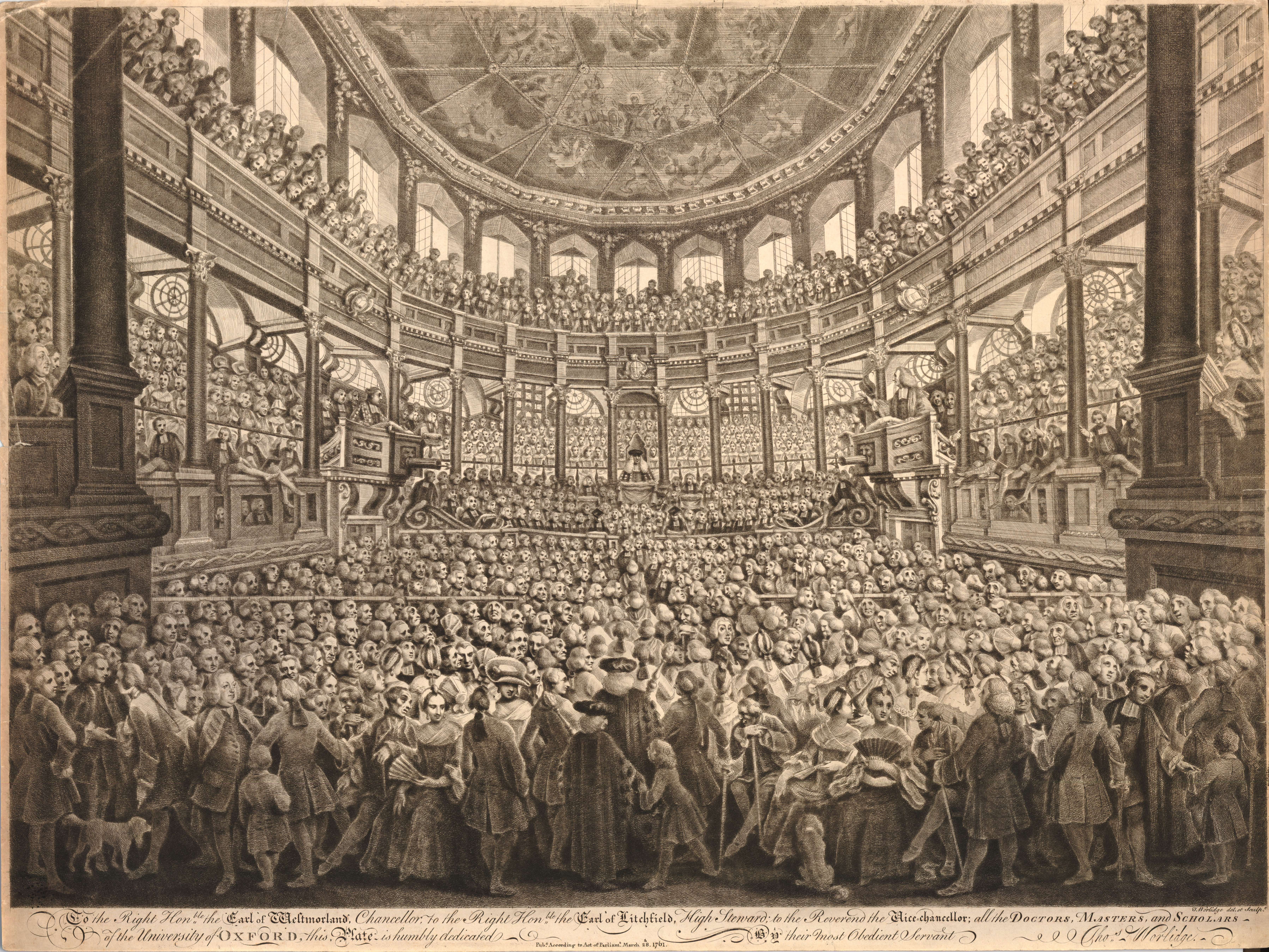
Engraving by Thomas Worlidge of the Sheldonian Theatre on the occasion of the 1759 installation of the Chancellor of Oxford University.

At the Encænia of 1763 King, amid great applause, delivered an oration. Charles Churchill, who was present, later sneered at his "piebald Latin" in the Candidate.

== Works ==
King thought himself badly treated in the course of his Irish lawsuit, and attacked his enemies in a mock-heroic poem, in two books, called The Toast (alleged to have been originally composed in Latin by a Laplander, "Frederick Scheffer", and translated into English, with notes and observations, by "Peregrine O'Donald, Esq.") The heroine, "Mira", is the Countess of Newburgh, who had secretly married as her third husband Sir Thomas Smyth, King's uncle. King portrayed her as a lesbian. It was published at Dublin in 1732. Swift praised it, and The Toast was completed in four books, inscribed to him, and printed in London (1736), with a frontispiece by Hubert-François Gravelot (engraver Bernard Baron); it was reissued in 1747. In his old age King regretted many passages, and at his death the remaining copies were burnt. The poem was reissued without the annotations in John Almon's New Foundling Hospital of Wit. A key to the characters is given in William Davis's Second Journey round the Library of a Bibliomaniac (1825).

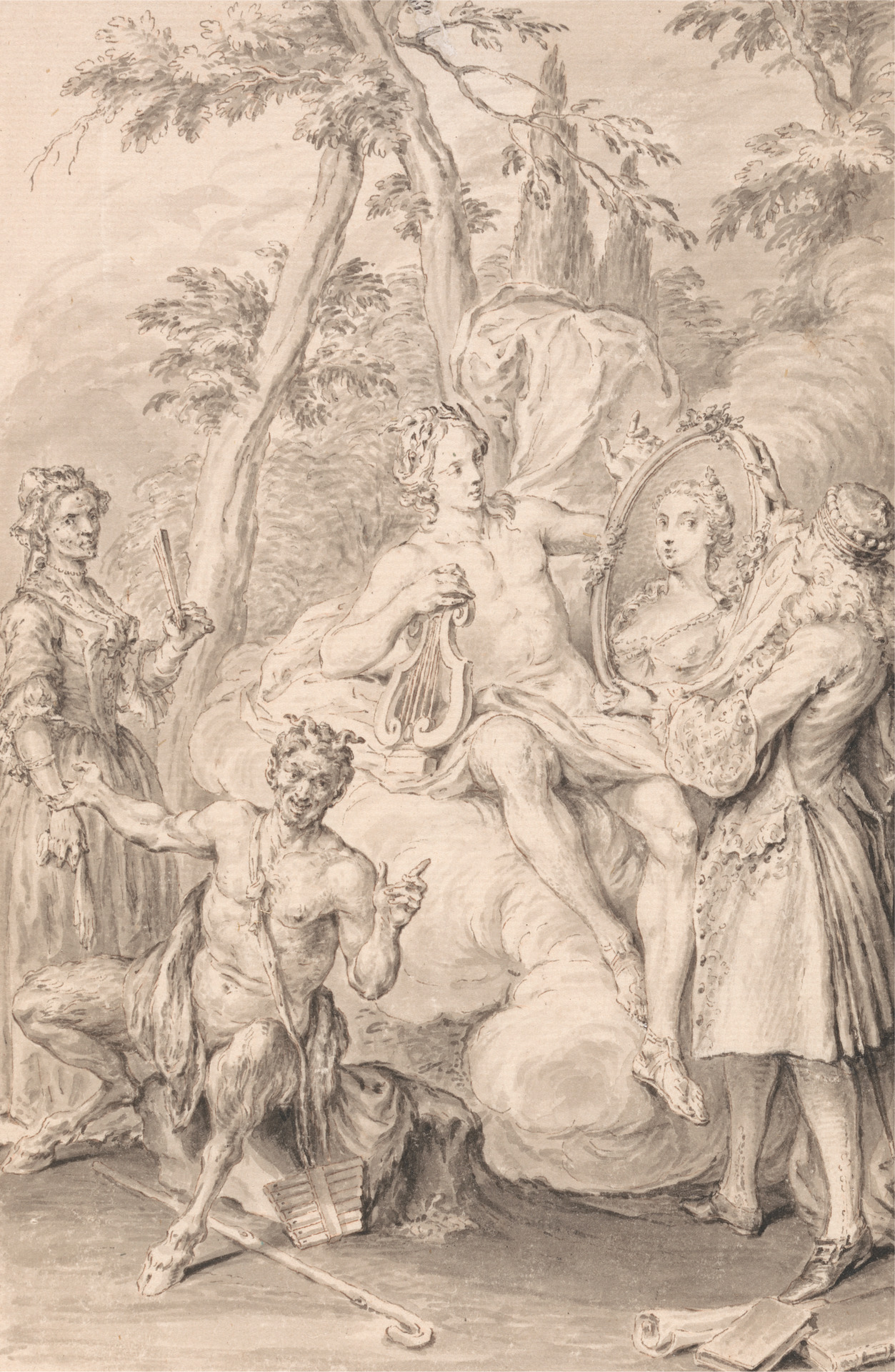
Original drawing (1735) for frontispiece to The Toast, by Hubert-François Gravelot

About April 1737 King wrote a witty political paper called Common Sense, in which he proposed a new scheme of government to the people of Corsica [i.e. Great Britain], advising them to make their king of the same stuff of which the Indians fashion their gods. He enclosed a copy in a letter to Swift, but both were intercepted at the post-office. It may have been identical with Antonietti ducis Corseorum epistola ad Corseos de rege eligendo included in King's collected writings. Through King, Swift then endeavoured in July to arrange for the publication in London of his History of the Four Last Years of the Queen. King remonstrated, and Swift gave up the intention for a time.

In 1739 King issued an anonymous political satire entitled Miltoni Epistola ad Pollionem (i.e. to Lord Polwarth), 1738, London, dedicated to Alexander Pope, of which a second edition appeared in 1740. Soon after the Jacobite Rebellion of 1745, King described Prince William, Duke of Cumberland as a man "qui timet omnia præter Deum" ("who fears everything except God"). In 1748 he ridiculed Edward Bentham, who had published a guide to intending students.

The Sheldonian oration was printed in 1749, and again in 1750. It gave rise to violent attacks. King was charged with barbarous Latin, Jacobitism, and propagation of sedition in the university. John Burton, cousin and patron of Edward Bentham, published some virulent Remarks on Dr. K——'s Speech, by "Phileleutherus Londinensis", 1750. King retorted savagely; this satire also attacks William Bowyer the younger, who had said something against King's latinity. King further translated all the abusive names which Burton had called him, and the complimentary phrases applied by Burton to himself, and printing the whole catalogue on a large sheet of the coarse paper then used as toilet paper, gave it to a scavenger to be cried about the streets of Oxford, Windsor, and Eton.

King published a volume of fanciful anonymous essays called The Dreamer, London, 1754, which was assailed in the Whig papers as tainted with Jacobitism. During 1755 he replied in a pamphlet. He retaliated against authors of libels which had appeared in the Evening Advertiser, attacked a tract called A Defence of the Rector and Fellows of Exeter College, and spoke severely of a canon of Windsor named Richard Blacow. Blacow then printed a Letter to William King, LL.D., 1755, in which he sought to make King responsible for a Jacobite demonstration by some undergraduates in February 1747.

A collected edition of his writings was published as Opera Guilielmi King, London, 1760. King wrote also: an inscription for the collection of statues presented to the university in 1756 by the Countess Dowager of Pomfret; an Elogium in 1758 on Chevalier John Taylor the oculist, of which he printed copies for his friends; and an epitaph on Beau Nash. His posthumous Political and Literary Anecdotes of his own Times, London, 1818 (2nd edit. 1819), mostly written in his seventy-sixth year, was edited by Philip Bury Duncan.

== Legacy ==
Assisted by the contributions of old members of St Mary Hall, King rebuilt the east side of the quadrangle, and added a new room to the principal's lodgings.

== Family ==
King married his cousin Henrietta Maria Wither in 1709. Their son, Charles King, born about 1711, was M.A. of St Mary Hall, and in holy orders. Their daughter Dorothy married William Melmoth the younger (1710–1799).
