= John Hooke =

John Hooke may refer to:

- John Hooke (academic), 13th-century Chancellor of the University of Cambridge
- John Hooke (politician) (c. 1605 – 1685), Member of Parliament for Winchester
- John Hooke (judge) (1655–1712), Irish lawyer
