= François Catrou =

French historian and Jesuit priest

François Catrou (French pronunciation: [fʁɑ̃swa katʁu]) (December 28, 1659 – October 12, 1737) was a French historian, translator, and Jesuit priest.

== Life ==
Catrou was born in Paris, the son of Mathurin Catrou, secretary to Louis XIV. During his college days a marked facility and grace in composition gave promise of his future literary success. At eighteen he entered the Society of Jesus. During his regular period of Jesuit probation and study his talents for preaching were discovered, and at the completion of his studies in 1690 he began his active career as a preacher, in which office he continued for ten years with remarkable success. In 1701 he founded the "Journal de Trévoux", and was an active member of its staff for twelve years. He died in Paris.

== Works ==
While engaged in journalistic duties Catrou found time for historical research, and to his productions in this line his fame is chiefly due.

=== History of the Mogul Dynasty ===
The Histoire generale de l'empire du Mogul was published in 1705. The matter was drawn, in the main, from the memoirs of the Venetian traveller Niccolao Manucci. It was translated into Italian as "Istoria generale del Imperio del Mogul" by Domenico Occhi and published in Venice in 1751. An English translation, the "History of the Mogul Dynasty" was published in London in 1826 and again, in 1907.

=== History of Fanaticism in the Protestant Religion ===
Catrou's "Histoire du fanatisme dans la religion protestante" was a controversial work dealing principally with the Anabaptists and the Quakers. The best edition is that published in two duodecimo volumes in Paris in 1740.

=== Roman History ===
The "Histoire romaine", with geographical and critical notes, was published in twenty-one quarto volumes between the years of 1725 and 1737. It was edited a second time in 1737. The notes are from the pen of P. Rouillé, S.J. This gigantic work was translated into Italian by Fra Zannino Marsecco in Venice in 1730–37, and into English by R. Bundy, as The Roman History with Notes, done into English from the Original French of the Rev. Fathers Catrou and Rouillé in London in 1728–37, in six folio volumes. The French work was highly praised at the time for its deep research and solid reasoning, but its somewhat pompous style soon brought severe censure from the critics. Its appearance in an English dress gave occasion to some very bitter attacks; but, though censured, this work provided inspiration to British historian Nathaniel Hooke, who in his Roman History drew freely from the text of Catrou and more freely from the critical notes of Rouillé.

=== Translation of Virgil ===
Catrou's translation of Virgil contained critical and historical notes. The translation is at all times free and not infrequently inaccurate. The notes and the accompanying life of Virgil manifest a thorough acquaintance with both poem and poet. Catrou's Virgil was a constant companion of the historian Edward Gibbon during his early studies. "I always consulted the most learned and ingenious commentators" he writes in his autobiography; "Torrentius and Dacier on Horace, and Catrou and Servius on Virgil".

== Works online ==
- Manucci, Niccolao (1826). History of the Mogul dynasty in India, 1399 - 1657. Translated by Catrou, François. London: J.M. Richardson.
