= Anne Erroll =

Scottish Jacobite and naturalist

Anne Hay, Countess of Erroll
- Born: Anne Drummond; 5 January 1656
- Died: circa 1719
- Notable work: Articles contributed to Scotia Illustrata and Dictionnaire Historique et Critique
- Movement: Jacobitism
- Spouse: John Hay, 12th Earl of Erroll
- Children: 4, including Charles Hay, 13th Earl of Erroll and Mary Hay, 14th Countess of Erroll
- Parent(s): James Drummond, 3rd Earl of Perth; Lady Anne Drummond

Anne Drummond, Countess of Erroll (5 January 1656 – c. 1719) was a Scottish Jacobite conspirator and naturalist. She contributed to reference books on the history and fauna of Scotland and used her home, New Slains Castle, to oversee communications between Scotland and France about the Jacobite effort to instate James Frances Edward Stuart as king.

== Family ==
She was born Anne Drummond, youngest child of James Drummond, 3rd Earl of Perth, and his wife Lady Anne Drummond, who died as a result of the childbirth. Her brothers were James Drummond, Lord Chancellor of Scotland under King James VII (also James II of England), and John Drummond, his Secretary of Estate.

On 1 October 1674 she married John Hay, becoming Anne Hay, countess of Erroll, when her husband succeeded as the 12th earl of Erroll that year. She was referred to at the time as Lady Anne Drummond, Countess of Erroll. 'Anne Erroll', as she is named in the Oxford Dictionary of National Biography, was the shortened form of her title for signing her letters (her husband would probably have signed his letters 'Erroll'). She had four surviving children: Charles, Thomas, Mary and Margaret. Charles and Mary each inherited the title of Erroll and were also involved with the Jacobite movement.

== Natural history and other writings ==
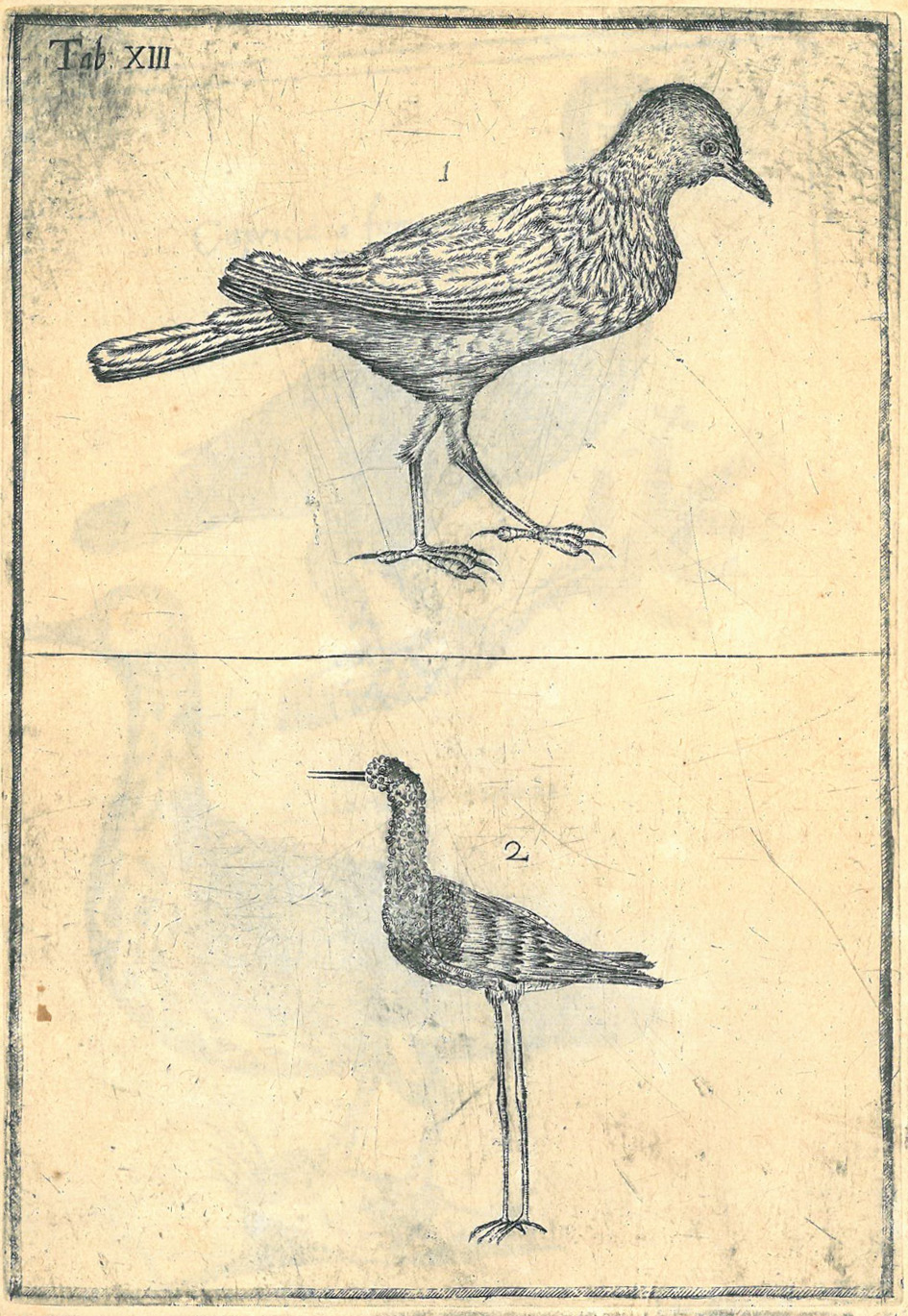
Illustrations of the redwing and the black-winged stilt by Anne Erroll.

In the 1680s, Anne submitted contributions of text and plates to Robert Sibbald’s Scotia Illustrata, a collaborative natural history book published in 1684. She illustrated the redwing and the black-winged stilt (or goosander) and sent texts containing descriptions of a sea eagle eyrie and a fin whale. Most notably, she contributed two articles on her family history to Pierre Bayle's Dictionaire Historique, a foundational text of the Early European Enlightenment, and possibly contributed several more articles in the dictionary concerning Scotland.

== Jacobite movement ==
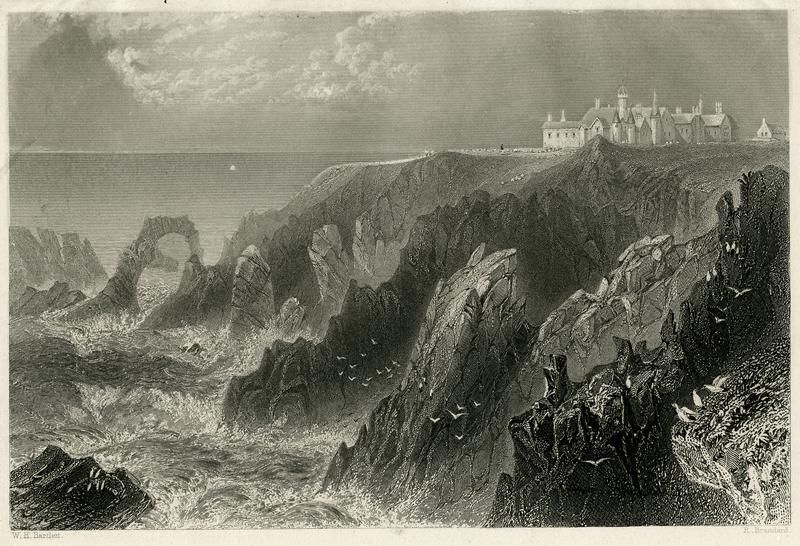
New Slains Castle (nineteenth-century engraving by Robert Brandard)

In the early eighteenth century, Anne was an important figure in the underground Jacobite movement in Scotland. She was one of three Jacobite Countesses of Erroll, including the previous countess, Lady Catherine Carnegie, and Anne's daughter, Lady Mary Hay, 14th Countess of Erroll, who recruited men for the 1745 Jacobite Rising.

Anne was described as 'the soul of the King's affairs in Scotland', the words of Simon Fraser, the future Lord Lovat. In other words, between 1704 and 1708 she was the representative in Scotland of the exiled James Francis Edward Stuart and the Jacobite Court at St Germain. In this capacity, she distributed correspondence to the network of conspirators; oversaw Jacobite communications between Scotland and France; and corresponded with Queen Mary about the Scottish Jacobites' terms. The Slains Castle estate providing 'money and horses, necessary to keep up a correspondence throughout the kingdom' leading to great debt for the family. Lady Anne Drummond is also known to have gathered military intelligence in Scotland. For example, In April 1705, she sent three persons to talk to the Highlanders, the Catholics, and the Episcopalians about their attitude to a potential rising: ‘the first two are ready to begin, but the Episcopalian Archbishop of Glasgow made some difficulty about what promises had been made by James Stuart to the Pope and the King of France'.

New Slains Castle received 'all envoys who have been sent to Scotland these four or five years past, the vessels which have been sent thither sailing always directly to his castle'. In 1704, Anne was caught up in the aftermath of what became known as the Queensbury Plot in Scotland and the Scottish Plot in England. Simon Fraser, the later Lord Lovat, was at the heart of the scandal, was part of a joint French/Jacobite mission sent to verify his claims that the Highlands would rise in support of James Stuart. Discredited, Fraser now persuaded the Marquis of Queensbury that his arch enemy, the Marquis of Atholl had tried to raise the Highland clans, only for the information to be uncovered as false. Opinion about the worth of Simon Fraser still split the Jacobite Court in France after this, and the French Court shipped an envoy to New Slains Castle with dispatches to be sent to trusted Jacobites, whose replies confirmed that Simon Fraser could not be trusted.

Twice, she hosted Nathaniel Hooke on his visits to Scotland, receiving him at her castle, New Slains, in 1705 and 1707, and communicating with him using invisible ink and linen signals in the windows of New Slains Castle. Hooke described her as 'a lady of about fifty, with a sound, penetrating mind. All the [Jacobites] have confidence in her.' Hooke's objectives on both the 1705 and 1707 visits was to gather military intelligence to establish the feasibility of fomenting a Jacobite rising in Scotland aided by the French, with the aim of distracting the English, then fighting Louis XIV's armies on the continent. Information gathered in 1707 led to the failed Franco-Jacobite invasion of Scotland in 1708 ( or the 'planned French invasion of Britain').

== Later life and death ==
She spent most of her later life at her country house at Delgatie, and died in or before August 1719, having outlived her husband and all of her children but Mary.
