= James Bentham =

English clergyman, antiquarian and historian

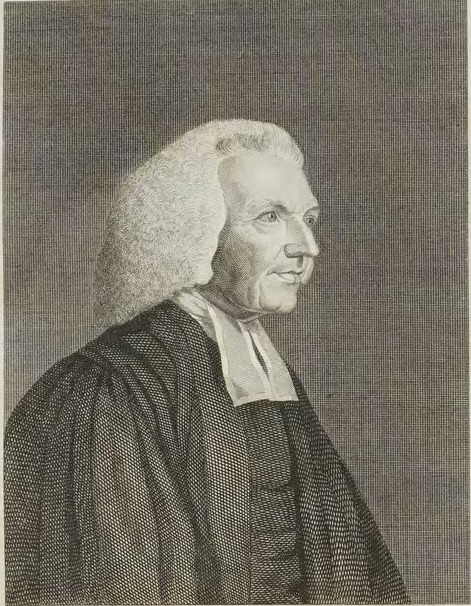
- Born: Ely
- Died: 17 November 1794; Ely
- Parent(s): Samuel Bentham
- Relatives: Edward Bentham

James Bentham (10 March 1709? – 17 November 1794) was an English clergyman, antiquarian and historian of Ely Cathedral.

== Life ==
Bentham was a son of the Rev. Samuel Bentham (c.1681–1733), registrar of Ely Cathedral and vicar of Witchford near Ely, and his wife, Philippa Willen (c.1681–1747). The Benthams were a clerical family, and James was the sixth priest in a continuous descent from Thomas Bentham (1513/14–1579), Bishop of Coventry and Lichfield. His elder brother, Edward (1707–1776) became a distinguished theologian and natural philosopher, and Regius Professor of Divinity at Oxford. The family were distant cousins of the philosopher and reformer Jeremy Bentham (1748–1832).

From Ely Grammar School, James was admitted 26 March 1727 to Trinity College, Cambridge, from which he graduated B.A. in 1730, and M.A. in 1738. In 1733 he was presented to the vicarage of Stapleford in Cambridgeshire, which he resigned in 1737, when he was made a minor canon of Ely.

In 1767 Bentham was presented by Bishop Matthias Mawson to the vicarage of Wymondham in Norfolk, and upon his resignation of that living in the following year to the rectory of Feltwell St Nicholas in the same county. This preferment he held till 1774, when Bishop Edmund Keene presented him to the rectory of Northwold, which, after five years' tenure, he gave up for a prebendal stall in Ely Cathedral. To this was added in 1783, on the presentation of the Rev. Edward Guellaume, the rectory of Bowbrick Hill, Buckinghamshire.

Bentham died at his prebendal house, Ely, on 17 November 1794, at the age of 86.

== Works ==
In 1757, Bentham published proposals for making turnpike roads under the title of Queries Offered to the Consideration of the Principal Inhabitants of the City of Ely and Towns adjacent. His plan, after encountering ridicule, was carried into effect under powers obtained by an act of parliament passed in 1763, and by the aid of subscriptions and loans of money. A road was made between Ely and Cambridge, and the system was extended to other parts of the Isle of Ely. Some twenty years later Bentham published Considerations and Reflections upon the Present State of the Fens, with a view to encouraging their improvement by draining and enclosing Grunty Fen, a large tract of common near Ely of 1,300 acres.

His major work, The History and Antiquities of the Conventual and Cathedral Church of Ely, was begun in 1756, when he circulated printed lists of the abbots, bishops, priors, and deans of Ely among his friends, for the purpose of obtaining materials. The work was sent to the press in 1764, and published in 1771. It was a quarto volume, printed at Cambridge by his brother Joseph (a Cambridge alderman, and printer to the university). William Cole's notes on Bentham's work are in William Davis's An Olio of Bibliographical and Literary Anecdotes and Memoranda, Original and Selected.

During the later period of his life Bentham collected materials for illustrating the "Ancient Architecture of this Kingdom", a work he was unable to complete.

== Family ==
Bentham married twice. His second wife, Mary Dickens of Ely, bore him a son, also named James, and a daughter. The younger James became vicar of West Bradenham in Norfolk. In 1812–17 he published, in two volumes at Norwich, a second edition of his father's History of Ely Cathedral, prefaced by a memoir of his father. Supplements were published by William Stevenson, also at Norwich, in 1817.

== Notes ==
Attribution

This article incorporates text from a publication now in the public domain: Harrison, Robert (1885). "Bentham, James". In Stephen, Leslie (ed.). Dictionary of National Biography. Vol. 4. London: Smith, Elder & Co.
