= William Melmoth =

17th/18th-century English devotional writer and lawyer

William Melmoth (sometimes "William Melmoth the Elder") (1665/66–1743) was an English devotional writer and lawyer, whose major work, The Great Importance of a Religious Life Consider'd (1711), proved to be one of the most popular pieces of religious writing of the 18th century. He was the father of William Melmoth (1710–1799), a Commissioner of Bankrupts.

== Life and career ==
Melmoth was admitted to the Inns of Court to begin his training as a barrister at Clifford's Inn on 15 April 1686, and then transferred to Inner Temple on 30 May 1689 and from there he was called to the Bar on 29 May 1693. Records show that he was admitted as a "gentleman." On his admission to the Bar he was called to take the Test Act oath that served as an oath of allegiance to William III and Mary II and the Protestant succession, he was troubled by Jacobite non-juror concerns of legitimacy. He wrote to John Norris, the religious writer, to ask whether swearing allegiance to an usurper might not make him an accessory to the usurpation.

However, Melmoth did take the oath, and in 1699 he moved to Lincoln's Inn, working mostly in chancery cases. He married, and this wife died around 1699 and left him property. He married again, a woman named Catharine, by 1710, and the two had four daughters and two sons to survive infancy. Among these was William Melmoth the Younger.

== Writings ==
As a high churchman, he was pleased with the accession of Queen Anne in 1702. He was active in the Society for the Propagation of Christian Knowledge and greatly concerned with the lasciviousness and "impiety" of the English stage. He wrote, anonymously, to rail against stage performances, including correspondence with Daniel Defoe and the then Archbishop of Canterbury, Thomas Tenison. It was during these years of 1703–1711 that Melmoth composed The Great Importance.

The Great Importance of a Religious Life Consider'd was published for the first time in 1711. Melmoth published the book anonymously. Like William Law's later A Serious Call to a Devout and Holy Life (1728), Melmoth's book emphasized personal renewal and religious awakening. Instead of focusing on social ills and matters of politics or polity, Melmoth focused on the individual Christian and urged a revitalized faith. The book was immediately successful and was translated into French and Welsh within a year. Melmoth's authorship of the book was not definitely asserted until his son did so in 1797. However, the work sold exceptionally well, having a staggering thirty editions by 1797 and selling 420,000 copies between 1766 and 1784 alone.

Melmoth wrote pamphlets and short works for publication, anonymously, throughout his public life, but he was only an occasional author. In 1719, he was made a Bencher of Lincoln's Inn and was soon recognised as one of the leading chancery counsel of the day. He devoted considerable energies to the physical and financial improvement of the Inn and continued to work up until a few days before his death on 6 April 1743.
