= Nathaniel Hooke =

English Historian

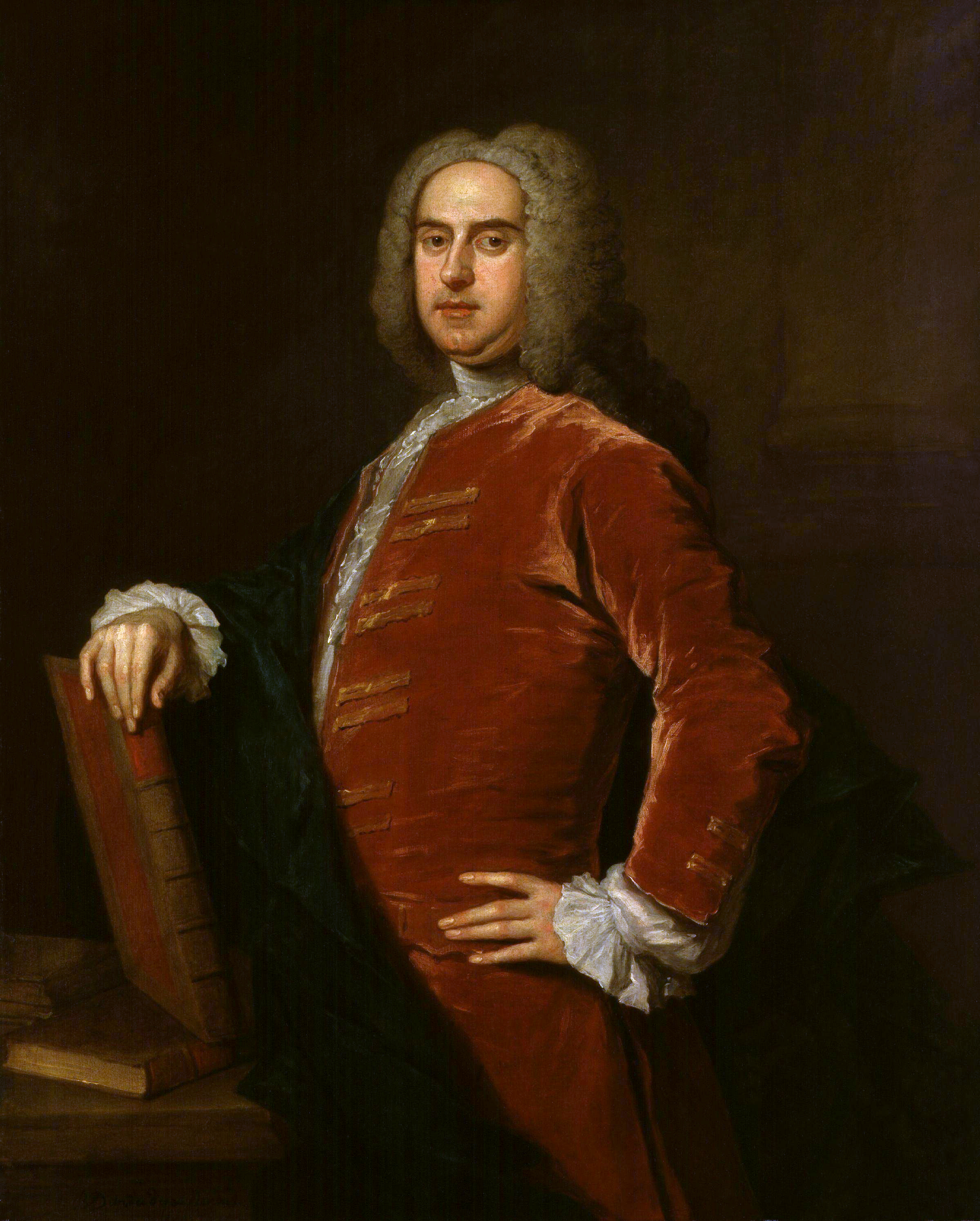
- Portrait of Hooke by Bartholomew Dandridge
- Died: 19 July 1763; Cookham, Berkshire

Academic background
- Education: Twyford School

Nathaniel Hooke (c. 1687 – 19 July 1763) was an English historian.

== Life ==
He was the eldest son of John Hooke, serjeant-at-law, and nephew of Nathaniel Hooke the Jacobite soldier. He is thought by John Kirk to have studied with Alexander Pope at Twyford School, and to have formed a lifelong friendship there.

He was admitted to Lincoln's Inn 6 February 1702. Caught up in the South Sea Bubble, he sought patronage. He dedicated to the Earl of Oxford a translation from the French of Andrew Michael Ramsay's 'Life of Fénelon' (published in 1723), London. Other patrons were Hugh Hume-Campbell, 3rd Earl of Marchmont, Richard Onslow, 1st Baron Onslow, François Fénelon, Pope, George Cheyne, and William King, principal of St. Mary Hall, Oxford.

When Sarah Churchill, Duchess of Marlborough required help with her memoirs, Hooke was recommended to her. He accordingly waited upon the aged duchess while she was still in bed; on his arrival she caused herself to be lifted up, and continued speaking for six hours without notes. Hooke resided in the house until the completion of the work, which appeared in 1742 under the title of An Account of the Conduct of the Dowager Duchess of Marlborough from her first coming to Court to the year 1710. Hooke received from the duchess £5,000. During his time with her she commissioned him to negotiate with Pope for the suppression, for payment of £3,000, of the character of 'Atossa' in his 'Epistles'. Owen Ruffhead stated (Life of Pope) that the duchess took a sudden dislike to Hooke because he attempted to convert her to Catholicism. John Whiston, however, asserted that at her death she left £500 a year to Hooke and David Mallet to write the history of the late Duke.

It was Hooke who brought a Roman Catholic priest to take Pope's confession on his deathbed. Hooke was also friendly with Martha Blount, who left a legacy to Miss Elizabeth Hooke. Hooke died at Cookham, Berkshire, on 19 July 1763, and was buried in Hedsor churchyard, where a tablet with a Latin inscription to his memory was put up at the expense of his friend Frederick Irby, 2nd Baron Boston, in 1801.

== Works ==
William Warburton described Hooke as "a mystic and quietist, and a warm disciple of Fénelon". Pope suggested that Hooke and Conyers Middleton were the only two contemporary prose-writers whose works were worth consulting by an English lexicographer.

Hooke's Roman History, from the Building of Rome to the Ruin of the Commonwealth (four volumes, London, 1738–1771, 4to), suggested itself to him while he was preparing an index to the English translation of François Catrou and Pierre Julien Rouille's Roman History. The first volume was dedicated to Pope, and introduced by "Remarks on the History of the Seven Roman Kings, occasioned by Sir Isaac Newton's Objections to the supposed 244 years of the Royal State of Rome". The second volume is dedicated to the Earl of Marchmont, and to it are annexed the Fasti Capitolini, or the consular lists, discovered at Rome during the pontificate of Pope Paul III in 1545. The third volume was printed under Hooke's inspection, but was not published until 1764, after his death. The fourth volume was published in 1771, edited by Gilbert Stuart. The whole work was frequently reprinted; the latest edition, in six volumes, appeared in 1830.

Other works are:

- ‘Travels of Cyrus, with a Discourse on Mythology,’ London, 1739, translated by Hooke from the French of Andrew Michael Ramsay.
- 'Observations on—I. The Answer of M. l'Abbé de Vertot to the late Earl Stanhope's Inquiry concerning the Senate of Ancient Rome, dated December 1719. II. A Dissertation upon the Constitution of the Roman Senate, by a Gentleman; published in 1743. III. A Treatise on the Roman Senate, by Dr. C. Middleton; published in 1747. IV. An Essay on the Roman Senate, by Dr. T. Chapman; published in 1750,' London, 1758; dedicated to Speaker Richard Onslow. This work was answered by Edward Spelman in an anonymous pamphlet entitled 'A Short Review on Mr. Hooke's Observations,' 1758. William Bowyer published 'An Apology for some of Mr. Hooke's Observations concerning the Roman Senate,' London, 1758.
- 'Six Letters to a Lady of Quality ... upon the subject of Religious Peace and the Foundations of it,' first printed in 'The Contrast; or an Antidote against the pernicious Principles disseminated in the Letters of the late Earl of Chesterfield,' 2 vols., London, 1791, and issued separately in 1816. The manuscript was given by Hooke to the widow of George Berkeley, who presented it to the Rev. Sir Adam Gordon, bart., (1745–1817), the editor of 'The Contrast.'

Hooke revised Thomas Townsend's translation of Antonio de Solís's History of the Conquest of Mexico by the Spaniards (1753).

== Family ==
He left two sons, Thomas Hooke, rector of Birkby and vicar of Leek, Yorkshire (died 1791); and Luke Joseph Hooke. His daughter, Jane Mary Hooke, died on 28 April 1793, and was buried in Hedsor churchyard.
