= Niccolao Manucci =

Venetian traveller, writer and physician

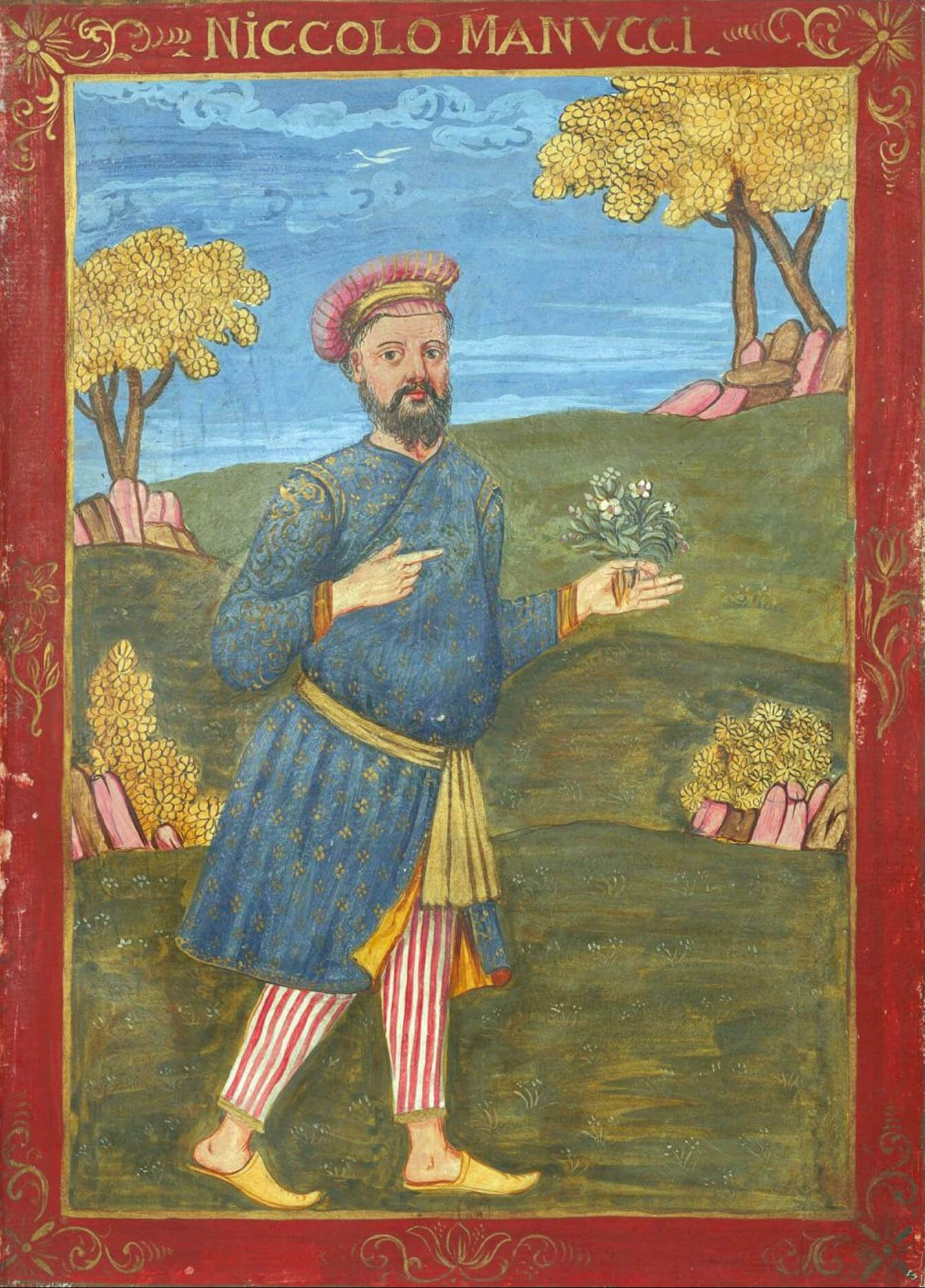
- Portrait of Manucci, National Library of France, Cabinet of Prints, Paris.
- Born: 19 April 1638; Venice, now Metropolitan City of Venice, Italy
- Died: 1717 (aged 79); Monte Grande, Chennai (present-day Tamil Nadu, India)
- Occupations: Physician, Historian, Geographer, Explorer
- Writing career
- Years active: c. 1660–1717
- Notable work: Storia do Mogor (1698)

Signature
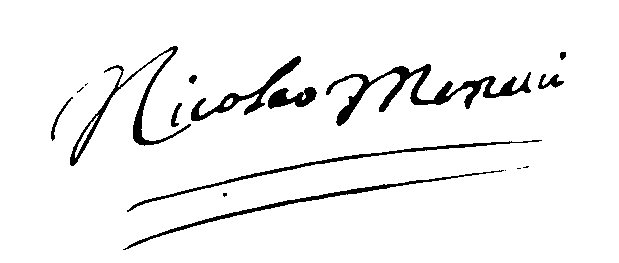

Niccolao Manucci (Note: The name is spelled variously: Manuzzi, Manuchy, Manouchy, Manouchi etc.) (19 April 1638 – 1717) was a Venetian writer, a self-taught physician, and traveller, who wrote accounts of the Mughal Empire as a first-hand witness. His work is considered to be one of the most useful foreign sources for the events that took place in India under Mughal rule. He also documented folk beliefs and customs of the period.

== Biography ==
Niccolò (or Nicolò) Manucci was born in Venice to Pasqualino Manucci and Rosa née Bellin. He joined an uncle in Corfu as a teenager and went aboard an English ship to India. In Delhi he lived with Jesuit priests learning Persian and some medical knowledge. He sent a ring back home with instructions that it should be sold for books on medicine to be sent back to him. After several dubious attempts as a medical practitioner with lucky cures effected for some influential patients he seems to have managed to work as a physician in the court of the Mughals. In 1653, he was recruited as a servant and guide by Henry Bard, 1st Viscount Bellomont, envoy from Charles II of England to Abbas II of Persia and Shah Jahan.

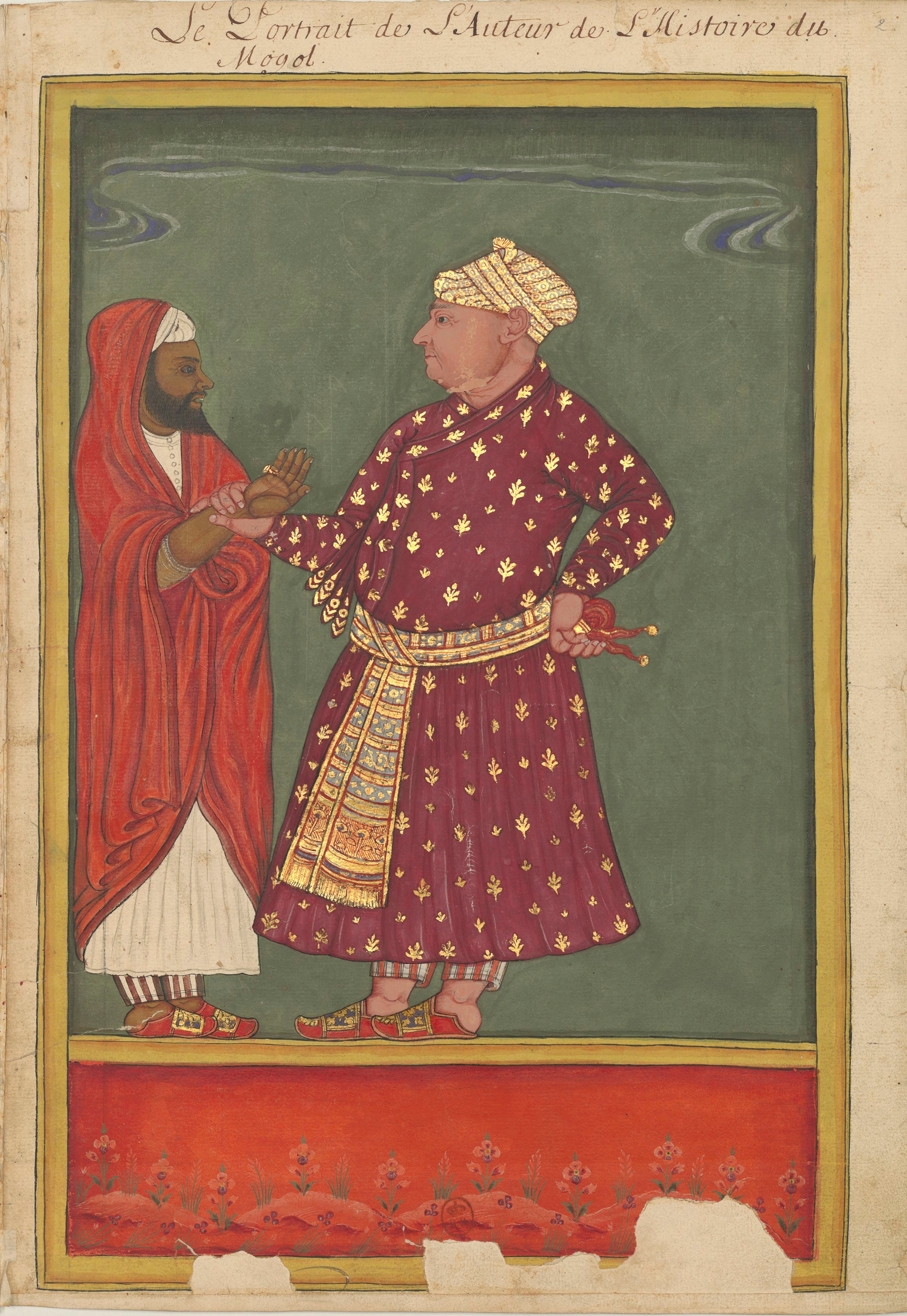
Manucci feeling the pulse of a patient

After Bard died at Hodal on 20 June 1656, Manucci moved to Surat and around 1656 he became an artillery man for Dara Shikoh. Following the death of Dara Shikoh he moved to Patna and later worked with Mirza Raja Jai Singh and in 1666 he tried to find work in Portuguese Bassein and Goa. He then returned to Mughal service in Lahore as a physician. He lost material in a shipwreck and then worked as a physician for Shah Alam in the Deccan. In 1682 he tried to act as an intermediary between the Portuguese and the Mughals and was made a member of the Order of Santiago by the Portuguese Viceroy Dom Francisco de Távora, Conde de Alvor but this ends in 1686 when he lost Mughal trust. He then moved to Hyderabad and then to Madras, marrying Elizabeth Hartley Clarke, widow of Portuguese interpreter Thomas Clarke. He lived in Madras with some work at Pondicherry where he obtained a house on the Rue Neuve de la Porte de Goudelour (Cuddalore). He maintained good relations with William Gyfford and Thomas Pitt.

Manucci remained in India for much of his life and is one of the few supposedly first hand European sources for Shah Jahan, Aurangzeb, Shivaji, Dara Shikoh, Shah Alam I, Jai Singh I and Kirat Singh. He had miniature paintings made of several of the Mughal rulers for his book.

== Storia do Mogor ==
Manucci is famous for his work "Storia do Mogor", an account of Mughal history and life. Manucci had first-hand knowledge of the Mughal court, and the book is considered to be the most detailed account of the Mughal court. It is an important account of the time of the later reign of Shah Jahan and of the reign of Aurangzeb. He also documented folk beliefs including witchcraft.

He wrote about his work: "I must add, that I have not relied on the knowledge of others; and I have spoken nothing which I have not seen or undergone..."

Manucci spent almost his entire life in India. He would then send home the manuscript for "Storia do Mogor" which was lent to the French historian François Catrou. To Manucci's displeasure Catrou published his own embellished version as Histoire générale de l’empire du Mogul in 1705. The original then emerged in Berlin in 1915 and was written in three different languages. This version was translated and then published.

== Works ==
Some of Manucci's works, reprints, and translations include:

- Manucci, Niccolao (1913). A Pepys of Mogul India 1653-1708. Translated by Irvine, William. New York: E.P. Dutton and Company.
- Manucci, Niccolao (1826). History of the Mogul dynasty in India, 1399 - 1657. Translated by François Catrou. London : J.M. Richardson.
- Manucci, Niccolao (1907). Storia do Mogor; or, Mogul India 1653-1708, Vol. 1. Translated by William Irvine. London, J. Murray.
- Manucci, Niccolao (1907). Storia do Mogor; or, Mogul India 1603-1708, Vol. 2. Translated by William Irvine. London, J. Murray.
- Manucci, Niccolao (1907). Storia do Mogor; or, Mogul India 1653-1708, Vol. 3. Translated by William Irvine. London, J. Murray.
- Manucci, Niccolao (1907). Storia do Mogor; or, Mogul India 1653-1708, Vol. 4. Translated by William Irvine.

== Sources ==
- Morgan, Basil (2004). "Bard, Henry, first Viscount Bellomont [Bellamont](1615/16–1656)". Oxford Dictionary of National Biography (online ed.). Oxford University Press. doi:10.1093/ref:odnb/1356. (Subscription, Wikipedia Library access or UK public library membership required.)
