= John Burton (scholar) =

English theologian and classical scholar (1696–1771)

John Burton, D.D. (1696–1771) was an English clergyman and academic, a theological and classical scholar.

== Biography ==
Burton was born at Wembworthy, Devon, where his father Samuel Burton was rector. He was educated partly at Okehampton and Blundell's School, Tiverton in his native county, and partly at Ely, where he was placed on his father's death by the Rev. Samuel Bentham, the first cousin of his mother. In 1713 he was elected as a scholar of Corpus Christi College, Oxford, and took his degree of B. A. on 27 June 1717, shortly after which he became the college tutor. He proceeded M.A. 24 March 1720-1, was elected probationary fellow 6 April following, and admitted actual fellow 4 April 1723.

He was a popular college tutor, as attested to in his friend Edward Bentham's 'De Vita et Moribus Johannis Burtoni . . . epistola ad Robertum Lowth,' 1771. It was through Burton that the study of Locke was introduced into schools. For younger students, he composed a series of philosophical questions. A set of exercises he assigned for summer vacation was entitled 'Sacræ Scripturæ locorum quorundam versio metrica,' 1736.

For the Oxford University Press he obtained a gift from John Rolle, and a legacy from Dr. Walter Hodges, the Provost of Oriel College. Through the circumstance that Burton had been tutor to a son of Dr. Henry Bland, a fellowship at Eton College was bestowed on him on 17 August 1733, and when the vicarage of Mapledurham became vacant by the death of Dr. Edward Littleton on 16 November 1733, Burton was nominated thereto by the college and inducted on 9 March 1734. Dr. Littleton had married a daughter of Barnham Goode, under-master of Eton School, and left her a widow 'with three infant daughters, without a home, without a fortune.' The new vicar allowed the family to remain for a time in their old home, and the story runs that 'some time after a neighbouring clergyman happened to call and found Mrs. Littleton shaving John Burton.' At this sight the visitor remonstrated with his clerical friend, and the result was that 'Burton proposed marriage and was accepted.' Burton devoted much of his income to improving the parsonage and the glebe lands.

On 1 February 1766, he quit the vicarage of Mapledurham for the rectory of Worplesdon in Surrey, He was instrumental in the building of the embanked causeway, including investing local church funds, for the main Woking road over the River Wey at the Woodbridge, Guildford so that his parishioners might travel to Guildford in all seasons. A year or two later he was seized by fever, but he still lingered on.

He died on 11 February 1771, and he was buried at the entrance to the inner chapel at Eton under the organ-loft.

== Published works ==
Burton wrote many tracts and sermons, most of which are reprinted in 'Occasional Sermons preached before the University of Oxford,' 1764–6. Many of his Latin tracts and addresses are in his 'Opuscula Miscellanea Theologica,' 1748–61, or in the volume 'Opuscula Miscellanea Metrico-Prosaica,' 1771.

He contributed to the Weekly Miscellany a series of papers on 'The Genuineness of Lord Clarendon's History of the Rebellion—Mr. Oldmixon's Slander confuted,' which was subsequently enlarged and printed separately at Oxford in 1744. The circumstances which led to their production are set out in Samuel Johnson's Lives of the Poets in the life of Edmund Smith: George Duckett had misled John Oldmixon, to the effect that Smith had been employed by Francis Atterbury and others to garble Lord Clarendon's history before it was published.

In 1758 he issued a volume, 'Πενταλογία, sive tragœdiarum Græcarum Delectus,' which was reissued with additional observations by Thomas Burgess in 1779.

Burton documented his visits to his mother in Sussex in 'Όδοιπορούντος Μελεθήματα, sive iter Surriense et Sussexiense.' Numerous extracts from this tour were printed in the 'Sussex Archaeological Collections,' viii. 250–65. His Latin poem, 'Sacerdos Parœcialis Rusticus,' was issued in 1757, and a translation by Dawson Warren of Edmonton came out in 1800.

=== Politics and religion ===
Though Burton was a Tory in politics, he was not so extreme as William King of St. Mary Hall, and he criticised, as 'Phileleutherus Londinensis,' the speech which King delivered at the dedication of the Radcliffe Library, 13 April 1749. King thereupon retorted with a fierce 'Elogium famæ inserviens Jacci Etonensis; or the praises of Jack of Eton, commonly called Jack the Giant,' with a dissertation on 'the Burtonic style,' and left behind him in his 'Anecdotes of his own Times' several stinging references to Burton.

An oration which Burton delivered at Oxford in 1763 gave him the opportunity for an attack on John Wilkes, whereupon Charles Churchill, in the 'Candidate' (verse 716 et seq.), retaliated with sneers at his 'new Latin and new Greek,' and his 'pantomime thoughts and style so full of trick.'

A Latin letter by Burton to a friend, or a 'commentariolus' of Archbishop Thomas Secker, attracted attention, and was criticised by Archdeacon Francis Blackburne on behalf of the latitudinarians, and by Philip Furneaux for the nonconformists in his 'Letters to Blackstone.'

When the settling of the Province of Georgia was a live issue, he took an active role, and published in 1764 'An Account of the Designs of the late Dr. Bray, with an Account of their Proceedings,' a tract often reprinted, on the episcopalian Thomas Bray.

=== Role in the founding of Georgia ===
Burton was recruited by James Oglethorpe, whom he had met at Oxford, to lay plans for a new colony in America. The initiative, which envisioned a model colony founded on humanistic principles, was taken up in 1730 by a philanthropic group known as the Associates of Dr. Thomas Bray. The group applied for a royal charter, which was granted in 1732. The charter created the Trustees for the Establishment of the Colony of Georgia in America, and Burton was named in the charter as a founding Trustee. Given Burton's close relationship with Oglethorpe it is likely he participated in framing the elaborate design of its economic system and settlement plan (see The Oglethorpe Plan). The humanistic principles upon which Georgia was founded were underscored in the Trustees' first annual sermon, which was delivered by Burton. Burton described the new colony as one where colonists would "seem in a literal sense to begin the world again." Leaving behind an Old World system that offered little opportunity, they would become part of a new society that would reward hard work and personal virtue. In the sermon, Burton also articulated a policy of "equity and beneficence" toward indigenous Americans.
