= Charles Hay, 13th Earl of Erroll =

Scottish peer (1677–1717)

The Right Honourable The Earl of Erroll
- Arms of the Earl of Erroll

17th Lord High Constable of Scotland
- In office 1704–1717
- Preceded by: John Hay
- Succeeded by: Mary Hay

Personal details
- Born: 1677 Errol, Scotland
- Died: 16 October 1717 (age 40)
- Parent(s): John Hay, 12th Earl of Erroll; Lady Anne Drummond
- Relatives: Mary Hay, 14th Countess of Erroll (sister)

Charles Hay, 13th Earl of Erroll (1677 – 16 October 1717) was a Scottish peer and Lord High Constable of Scotland who strongly opposed the 1707 union of Scotland and England.

== Biography ==
Charles Hay was the eldest son of John Hay, and his wife, Anne, daughter of James Drummond, the 3rd Earl of Perth.

He also succeeded his father as Chancellor of King's College, Aberdeen; in 1704 to 1717. In March 1705 he was made a knight of the Order of the Thistle by the exiled James Francis Edward Stuart.

The earl was opposed to the union of Scotland and England in 1707, voicing his dissent:

"I, Charles, Earl of Erroll, Lord High Constable of Scotland, do hereby protest – that the office of High Constable, with all the rights and privileges of the same, belonging to me heritably, and depending upon the Monarchy, Sovereignty, and ancient constitution of this Kingdom, may not be prejudiced by the Treaty of Union between Scotland and England, nor any article, clause, or condition thereof, but that the said heritable office, with all the rights and privileges thereof, may remain to me and my successors, entire and unhurt by any votes or Acts of Parliament whatever relating to the said Union; and I crave that this, my protestation, may be recorded in the registers and rolls of Parliament."

During the Jacobite uprising in 1708, Erroll was arrested and imprisoned in Edinburgh Castle on suspicion of his involvement with the attempted French invasion.

The earl died unmarried, aged 40. As he died childless, the earldom fell to his sister Mary, Countess of Erroll, who became the first suo jure countess of Erroll.

Military offices
Preceded by John Hay	Lord High Constable of Scotland; 1705–1717	Succeeded by Mary Hay
Peerage of Scotland
Preceded by John Hay	Earl of Erroll; 1705–1717	Succeeded by Mary Hay
