= Richard Blacow =

Richard Blacow MA (died 1760) was a Canon of Windsor from 1754 to 1760.

== Career ==
He was educated at Brasenose College, Oxford and graduated BA in 1744, MA in 1747.

He was ordained deacon in Rochester on 24 September 1749.

He was appointed:

- Fellow of the Royal Society 1754 - 1760
- Rector of Hartley Westpall 1757 - 1760

He was appointed to the eighth stall in St George's Chapel, Windsor Castle in 1754 and held the canonry until 1760.

In 1755 he wrote a letter to William King, principal of St Mary Hall in Oxford, giving an account of the riot in Oxford in February 1747 and accusing William King of being responsible for it. Blacow had been in Oxford at the time of the riot, and brought the three ringleaders to the Vice-Chancellor for punishment.
