= William Melmoth the younger =

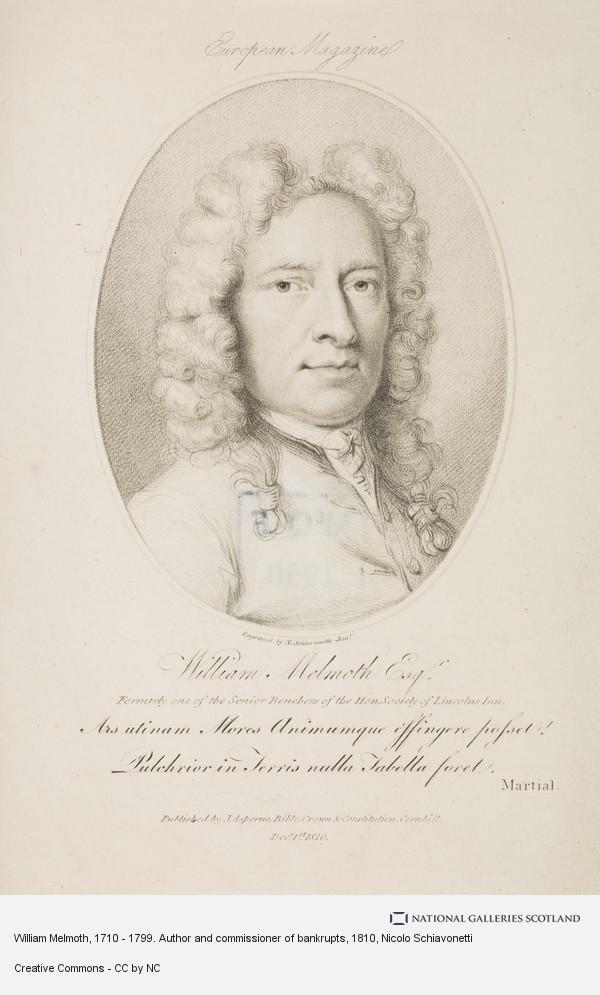
- Born: 1710 (Possibly) London, UK
- Died: 13 May 1799 (aged 88–89); No. 12 Bladud's Buildings, Bath
- Resting place: Batheaston
- Title: Lawyer
- Parents: William Melmoth (father); Catherine Holt (mother)

William Melmoth the younger (c.1710–1799) was an English lawyer and man of letters.

== Life ==
He was the son of William Melmoth the elder and his second wife, Catherine Rolt, was probably born in London, and was baptised in 1710. He was schooled in Westminster, and entered Lincoln's Inn in 1724. He matriculated at Magdalene College, Cambridge in 1726.

Melmoth's initial legal career was short. He resided at Ealing to 1762, then moved to Bath, Somerset. In 1756 Sir John Eardley Wilmot had appointed him a commissioner of bankrupts.

At the close of the 18th century, Melmoth was a familiar figure in Bath literary society. He died at No. 12 Bladud's Buildings, Bath, on 13 May 1799. There was a Latin epitaph placed on a tablet in Bath Abbey; but Melmoth was buried at Batheaston.

== Works ==
Melmoth published:

- Letters on Several Subjects, 1742, under the pseudonym "Sir Thomas Fitzosborne". Fitzosborne's Letters, vol. 2, appeared in 1747, with a translation of the De Oratoribus of Tacitus.
- Letters of Pliny the Younger, 1746, translator; praised by Thomas Birch and Thomas Warton. A second edition was printed in 1747, a third in 1748. In 1791 Jacob Bryant attacked Melmoth for asserting in this work that the persecution under Trajan was due to the principles of the Roman state; Melmoth replied in a pamphlet of 1793.
- Ad Familiares by Cicero, 1753, translator.
- De Senectute by Cicero, 1773, translator.
- De Amicitia, translator.
- Memoir of a late eminent Advocate, 1796, on William Melmoth the elder.

Melmoth contributed numerous anonymous essays and much verse to The World. The Travels in Switzerland of William Coxe consists of letters addressed to him in the late 1770s.

== Reputation ==
Samuel Johnson was not impressed with Melmoth, regarding him as no threat. As he told Hester Thrale, he had once "in some small dispute reduced him to whistle". Thomas De Quincey, who was offered a chance to view his manuscripts around 1813, opined that "Melmoth was a fribble in literature". On the other hand, William Coxe praised him as a literary guide.

== Family ==
Melmoth married Dorothy King, daughter of William King, Principal of St Mary Hall, Oxford. After her death, he married Mrs. Ogle, a widow.

== Notes ==
Attribution

This article incorporates text from a publication now in the public domain: Lee, Sidney, ed. (1894). "Melmoth, William (1710-1799)". Dictionary of National Biography. Vol. 37. London: Smith, Elder & Co.
