= Edward Bentham =

- Born: 23 July 1707; Ely, England
- Died: 1 August 1776 (aged 69); Oxford, England
- Occupation: Regius Professor of Divinity at Oxford University
- Spouse: Elizabeth Bates
- Children: Edward (died young); Thomas; Elizabeth
- Parent: The Rev. Samuel Bentham

Edward Bentham (23 July 1707 – 1 August 1776) was an Oxford based theologian who in 1763, with some evident reluctance, became Regius Professor of Divinity at Oxford University.

== Life ==
=== Family, provenance and early years ===
Edward Bentham was born at Ely where his father, the Rev. Samuel Bentham, was employed as a minor canon at the cathedral. The Benthams were a clerical family, and Edward was the sixth priest in a continuous descent from Thomas Bentham (1513/14–1579), Bishop of Coventry and Lichfield. His younger brother, James Bentham achieved distinction as an antiquarian and historian of Ely Cathedral. The family were distant cousins of the philosopher and reformer Jeremy Bentham (1748–1832).

=== Oxford ===
In 1717, on the recommendation of Dr. Smalridge, then a fellow of Christ Church college, Bentham was sent away to Oxford where he sang as a chorister at Christ Church, before entering the college as a student on 28 March 1724. He studied under the supervision of John Burton, a cousin who became also a friend. He was listed as a scholar in 1726. Sources commend Bentham's erudition and even temperament. As soon as he had taken his Bachelor of Arts degree he was invited by the principal of Magdalen Hall to become vice-principal of that college, and took up the appointment on 6 March 1730 (Gregorian), still aged only 22. However, the appointment proved short-lived, since on 23 April 1731 he was elected to the fellowship at Oriel College, where he was appointed a tutor the next year. He retained the tutorship at Oriel till 1752.

Further promotions and appointments followed. He obtained his Bachelor of Divinity degree on 26 March 1743, becoming a Doctor of Divinity in 1749. On 22 April 1743 he was allocated a Prebendary stall at Hereford Cathedral. At Oxford he was nominated as a canon at Christ Church in April 1754, the previous canon, a Dr. Newton, having died. Bentham's installation followed on 9 June 1754, and while canon he also acted as subdean and treasurer for more than another twelve years. He set in place reforms to address the "great confusion" in the "affairs of the [cathedral] treasury" which he found on taking up his appointment. (There is also mention made of the "negligence of the deputy [treasurer]".)

It was at this time, on 22 June 1754, that Edward Bentham married Elizabeth Bates (died 1790) from Alton in the nearby county of Hampshire.

=== Regius professorship ===
Edward Bentham's appointment to the Oxford regius professorship of divinity took place in May or June 1763, following the death of the previous incumbent, John Fanshawe. The professorship came with an automatic entitlement to a canonry at Christ Church: unfortunately, however, the eighth prebendary chair to which this canonry entitled him was lower in the Christ Church cathedral hierarchy than the fifth prebendary chair which Bentham had up till now occupied since 1754. In this sense, it was impossible to avoid the observation that elevation to the regius professorship represented not merely an academic promotion but also a canonical demotion. In this context the Archbishop of Canterbury supplied a critique of the appointment (which he had himself recommended to the king and energetically encouraged Bentham to accept) in a letter written to the Archbishop of York on 31 May 1763: "I am sorry for poor Bentham, but I am glad for the University". It is also reported that Edward Bentham's brother, the church historian James Bentham, saw the regius professorship as a step along the way to further ecclesiastical promotion; but in the event Edward Bentham was still serving as the Oxford University regius professor of divinity when he died more than thirteen years later, in October 1776.

Bentham was an active regius professor. Encouraged by Archbishop Secker, in 1764 he instigated a yearly course of thrice weekly lectures for those intending to seek ordination into the English priesthood. The "striking innovation" in this context, according to the twentieth-century historian R.Greaves, was that Bentham did not charge any fees to students attending the lectures. Surviving notes by students indicate a real-world practical approach, coupled with an adherence to the lecturer's own moderate high church biblical orthodoxy.

=== Death ===
Edward Bentham (1707-1776): publications
(not a complete list)

- Reflections upon the Nature and Usefulness of Logick (1740)
- Introduction to Moral Philosophy (1745)
- Letter to a Young Gentleman of Oxford (1749)
- A Letter to a Fellow of a College
- De studiis theologicis praelectio (1764)
- Reflections on the Study of Divinity (1771)
- An Introduction to Logick (Scholastick and Rational) (1773)
- De tumultibus Americanis (1776)

During his lifetime Bentham was noted as an early riser who had often completed half a day's work before many others had begun their day. He enjoyed good health, but during his final years suffered a sporadic weakness in his eyes, attributed to "too free an use of them when he was young". He was incapacitated by his final illness from 23 July 1776, but battled on with his studies "like a faithful soldier, in the exercise of his religion", dying at the start of the next month.

== Evaluation ==
Edward Bentham had a wide circle of friends in the academic world, but he also had his critics, and he seems to have made a long term enemy of William King, the Master of St Mary Hall (college), who after his death described Bentham waspishly as "Half a casuist, half lawyer, half Courtier, half Cit, Half Tory, half Whig (may I add, half a Wit?)".

After his death there were many, including his brother James, who went into print with the opinion that he should have advanced further in his career than he did, but there are signs elsewhere that he lacked some of the ambition and political skill necessary for such advancement, "a very honest, virtuous, good man; a good husband and father, and an excellent brother, but ...[a] poor creature ... in conversation, manner, and behaviour...a plodding, industrious man, bred under his cousin John Burton of Eton," according to the antiquary William Cole who evidently knew him. The criticisms are more quotable, and more quoted, than the plaudits, but it is nevertheless clear that Edward Bentham was also widely admired and liked.
