= Edward Spelman =

English author and translator (1693–1767)

Edward Spelman or Yallop (18 June 1693 – 12 March 1767) was an English writer and translator.

== Life ==
He was the son of Charles Yallop of Bowthorp Hall, Norfolk, by his wife Ellen, daughter and heiress of Sir Edward Barkham, bart., of Westacre, Norfolk. Edward's grandfather, Sir Robert Yallop, married Dorothy, daughter of Clement Spelman. Edward, who in later life adopted the surname of Spelman, added classical literature to the pursuits of a country gentleman. He lived at High House, near Rougham, Norfolk. He died unmarried on 12 March 1767 at Westacre.

== Works ==
In 1742 he translated Xenophon's Anabasis, under the title ‘The Expedition of Cyrus into Persia, with Notes Critical and Historical,’ London. It went through several editions, and was republished as late as 1849. Spelman's translation was styled by Edward Gibbon ‘one of the most accurate and elegant that any language has produced’. He also translated ‘A Fragment out of the Sixth Book of Polybius,’ London, 1743, and ‘The Roman Antiquities of Dionysius Halicarnassus, with Notes and Dissertations,’ London, 1758. The latter work won the praise of Adam Clarke, the former that of Edward Harwood.

Spelman was also the author of:

- ‘A Short Review of Mr. Hooke's Observations concerning the Roman Senate and the Character of Dionysius Halicarnassus,’ London, 1758, written in reply to some criticisms of Nathaniel Hooke; Spelman's tract was answered by William Bowyer in ‘An Apology for some of Mr. Hooke's Observations,’ London, 1783.
- ‘The History of the Civil War between York and Lancaster,’ Lynn, 1792; completed by George William Lemon.

Under the title of ‘Two Tracts’ Lemon also issued an essay by Spelman on Greek accents, with one of his own on the ‘Voyage of Æneas from Troy to Italy,’ London, 1773.
