= Remoria =

Legendary Roman place

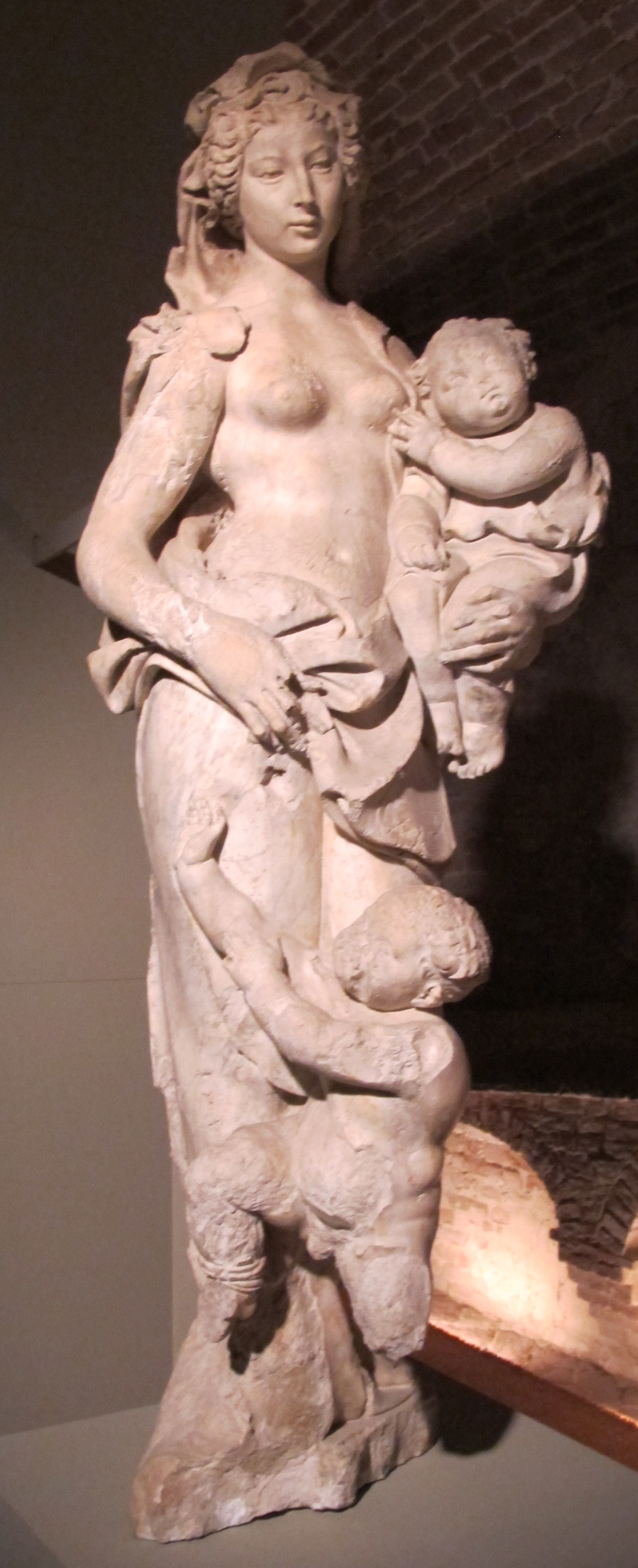
Statue of Acca Larentia with Romulus and Remus

Remoria (also spelled Remuria, Remora, and Remona) is a place associated with the legendary founding of Rome by Romulus and Remus where, according to Roman tradition, Remus saw six birds land, which he chose as an auspicious location for the future city. Some variants of the legend say that Remoria was also the place where Remus was buried after he was killed by Romulus.

== Location ==
Roman historical sources provide conflicting information about the exact location of Remoria. While some sources place it on the peak of the Aventine, others place it on a hill near the Tiber, at a distance of either 5 Roman miles or 30 stadia downstream from the Palatine hill. Plutarch identifies the summit of the Aventine as the auguraculum and the tomb of Remus but refers to it as Ρεμώνιον (Rhemónion) or Ρεμώνια (Rhemónia), noting that it was contemporaneously called Ριγνάριον (Rhignárion). Later generations of historians have used literary and archaeological evidence to build a hypothesis that places Remoria on the left bank of the Tiber, further south of the city. During their study on the walls of Rome, the archaeologists Antonio Nibby and William Gell placed the site on the location of the Basilica of Saint Paul Outside the Walls in the Ostiense quarter.

In a 2003 essay, the archaeologist and historian Filippo Coarelli notes that the legendary figures of Romulus and Remus, first appearing in the historical record no earlier than the 4th century BC, were substituted into an earlier myth of the founding of Rome by the Lares, twelve sons of the deity Acca Larentia (etymologically, Mother of the Lares). Remus represents the Roman plebs, thus explaining his traditional association with the Aventine hill, where the plebs staged a secession in 449 BC. By combining the figurative location of Remoria at a place associated with the plebs and the literal location at a distance of 5 miles from the ancient city (a symbolic number representing the limit of the archaic ager romanus) on the banks of the Tiber, Coarelli argues that the location of Remoria is in the sacred grove of the goddess Dea Dia near the Via Campana, in the present-day zone of Magliana on the right bank of the Tiber. During the Kingdom and early Republic, the grove was an important site for auspication and haruspication in the care of the Arval Brethren, a college of priests tracing their descent from Romulus and the sons of Acca Larentia. In this view, Romulus and Remus represent the dichotomy between the Urbs (city) dominated by the patricians and the Arva (farmlands) dominated by the plebeians.
