= Nathaniel Hooke (Jacobite) =

Irish soldier and diplomat for the King of France

Nathaniel Hooke (1664 – 25 October 1738) was an Irish soldier and diplomat for the King of France (both Louis XIV and Louis XV) and a Baron in the Jacobite Peerage of Ireland (as Baron Hooke of Hooke Castle, cr. 1708).

== Early life ==
Born at Corballis in County Meath, he was the third son of John Hooke, of Drogheda and grandson of Alderman Thomas Hooke, of Dublin; his eldest brother was Judge John Hooke (1655–1712). Hooke received his early education at Kilkenny College.

In 1679, he entered Trinity College, Dublin but he left almost immediately, possibly on account of contention with non-conformist religious opinions. He went to Glasgow University in 1680, before being admitted a sizar at Sidney Sussex College, Cambridge on 6 July 1681.

== Monmouth's rebellion ==
Hooke left Cambridge University as he had Glasgow, without obtaining a degree. He went abroad to join Archibald, Earl of Argyll's forces in Holland. In 1685, he landed with the Duke of Monmouth at Lyme Regis, acting in the guise of his "personal chaplain". When, at the beginning of July, Monmouth advanced into Somerset, Hooke was sent as a secret envoy to London with Henry Danvers to raise an insurrection in the City; he was exempted from the General Pardon issued on 10 March 1685–86, but in 1688 he gave himself up and was pardoned.

== Jacobite soldier ==
From this point, Hooke became a loyal servant of King James II and VII and a Roman Catholic convert. After James's abdication, he joined John, Viscount Dundee in Scotland, but in May 1689, was captured at Chester and sent to the Tower of London. He was released on 12 February 1690, went to Ireland, served in the Jacobite Army at the Battle of the Boyne, and then entered French service in the Galmoye Regiment.

In 1702, Hooke entered into communication with the Duke of Marlborough; the next year, he was given a command in the Sparre Regiment, and served in the War of the Spanish Succession with the French Army at Flanders and the Moselle. In August 1705 he led a mission to the Scottish Jacobites, and in 1706 he requested French naturalisation, before taking part in the Battle of Ramillies.

In April 1707, Hooke again went to Scotland, with Lieutenant-Colonel Lord John Murray, to liaise with the Jacobites. The next year, he became a Brigadier-General of the French Army (3 March 1708) and was created an Irish Baron before seeing action in the Dunkirk expedition of that year, and at the Battle of Malplaquet in the following year.

== Later life ==
Hooke turned down a mission in 1709, to go again as an emissary to Scotland. Instead, in 1711 he went to Dresden on a diplomatic mission on behalf of Louis XIV to Augustus II, but this negotiation was ineffective given the Treaty of Utrecht.

The Jacobite rebellion of 1715 did not seriously involve Hooke; he was in touch that year with John, Earl of Stair KT, British Ambassador to Paris, although possibly only to gather information. On 18 March 1718 he became a "maréchal de camp" (major-general). On 1 January 1720 his letters of naturalisation were confirmed and registered, and on 27 April 1721 Louis XV appointed him a Commander of the Order of Saint Louis. He was also a Knight of Malta.

Lord Hooke died on 25 October 1738.

== Letters ==
Hooke's correspondence from 1703 to 1707, partly transcribed by his nephew Nathaniel Hooke, were donated to the Bodleian Library in Oxford for safe keeping. It was edited (2 vols. with memoir), by William Dunn Macray for the Roxburghe Club, 1870–71. Parts had already appeared in Revolutions d'Ecosse et d'Irlande en 1707, 1708, et 1709 (1758) published at The Hague 1758, and in James Macpherson's Original Papers (1775).

== Family ==
Hooke married, in 1704, Eleanor Susan MacCarthy Reagh (styled Eleanor, The Lady Hooke from 1708), Lady-in-Waiting to Queen Mary, and had by her one son, James Nathaniel Hooke (1705–1744), 2nd and last Baron Hooke.

== See also ==
- List of Ambassadors of France to the United Kingdom

Peerage of Ireland
New creation	— TITULAR — Baron Hooke of Hooke Castle; Jacobite peerage 1708–1738	Succeeded by James Hooke
