= John Hooke (judge) =

John Hooke (1655–1712) was a lawyer and judge in England and Wales.

== Life ==
He was born in Ireland. His grandfather, Thomas Hooke (died 1672), was a merchant who supported Parliament during the Civil Wars of the 1640s, and who became mayor of Dublin in 1654. His father, also called John Hooke, was a nonconformist Protestant minister.

Hooke's education included grammar school in Kilkenny College and university in Trinity College Dublin. In 1675 he moved to England to undertake legal studies at Gray's Inn in London, and qualified as a barrister in 1681. He married Elizabeth Lambert, daughter of imprisoned Parliamentary general John Lambert. The marriage brought useful connections within commercial circles and Hooke's legal career flourished.

Having bought land in West New Jersey and considered emigrating to America during the reign of King James II, Hooke decided to remain in England after the Revolution of 1688 brought William of Orange to power. Gaining favour with the new regime, he was promoted to serve as a judge in North Wales in 1689. He became the senior judge in the area in 1695, and added a position Chester to his other duties.

Hooke's religion had changed from the nonconformist beliefs of his father and grandfather to mainstream Anglicanism. He became one of the founders of the Society for the Propagation of Christian Knowledge (SPCK) in 1699 and remained involved with the operation of the SPCK for many years. Again he made influential friends and contacts in political, business and legal circles in London. In a 1710 letter to Robert Harley, senior minister in the administration of Queen Anne, Hooke refused to declare himself either a Whig or a Tory in politics. This refusal to clearly identify with one or the other of the major parties may have complicated the later years of Hooke's life.

He was dogged by controversy and involved in complicated legal actions from 1707 until the end of his life. Accused of accepting gifts contrary to the rules governing his position as a judge, he was investigated by a committee of the House of Commons. Although exonerated in a vote of the House, his position was further undermined by a bitter dispute with Daniel Coxe, his former partner in land investment in New Jersey, which ended up in the Chancery Court in London.

Hooke died in 1712 with neither controversy satisfactorily settled. He wrote a book on religion, Catholicism Without Popery: An Essay to Render the Church of England a Means and a Pattern of Union to the Christian World (London, 1699).

== Family ==
Hooke was survived by his wife Elizabeth, his son Nathaniel Hooke the historian, and his brother, also Nathaniel Hooke, a soldier, intelligence agent and ambassador in French service.
