= Dacier =

Dacier is a surname. Notable people with the surname include:

- André Dacier (1651–1722), French classical scholar and editor of texts
- Anne Dacier (1651–1720), French scholar, translator, commentator, editor of the classics, and wife of the above
- Bon-Joseph Dacier (1742–1833), French historian, philologist, and translator of ancient Greek
