= Robert Noel (officer of arms) =

British officer of arms

Robert Noel LVO
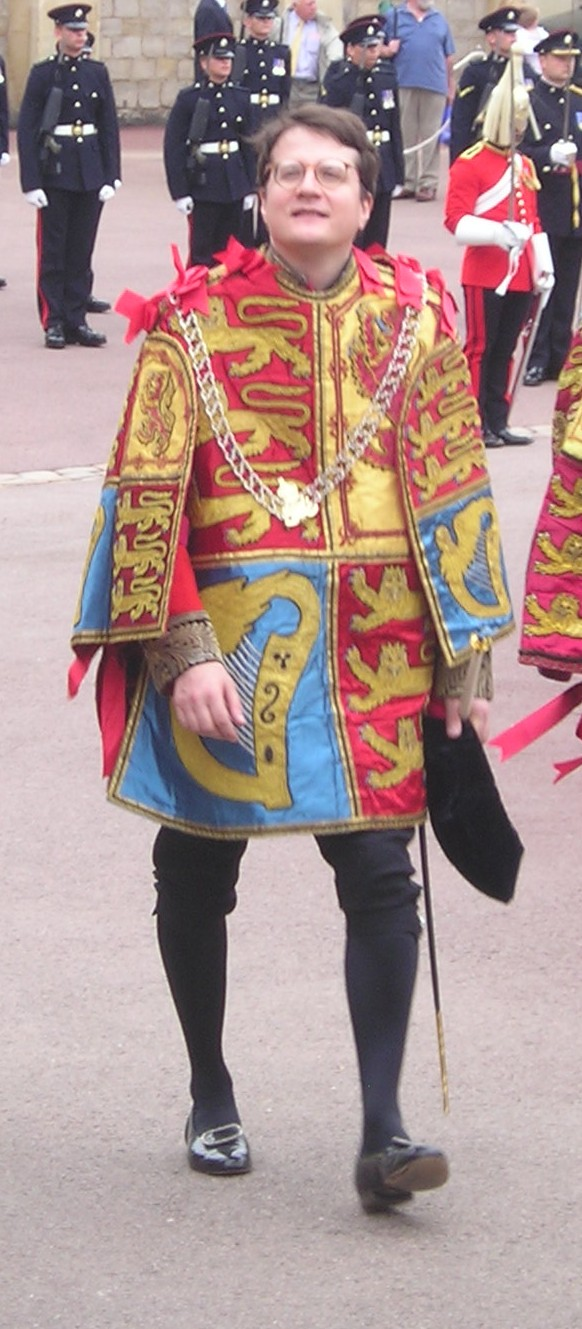
- As Lancaster, at a Windsor Garter Service, 2006

Clarenceux King of Arms
- Incumbent
- Assumed office 28 October 2024
- Monarch: Charles III
- Preceded by: Timothy Duke

Personal details
- Born: 15 October 1962 (age 64)
- Spouse: Rowena Hale (m. 2013)
- Children: 3
- Parents: Gerard Eyre Wriothesley Noel (father); Adele Julie Patricia Were (mother)
- Education: Exeter College, Oxford; St Edmund's College, Cambridge

Robert John Baptist Noel LVO (born 15 October 1962) is an officer of arms at the College of Arms in London, who serves as Clarenceux King of Arms since October 2024.

== Early life ==
The younger son of barrister Gerard Eyre Wriothesley Noel, of Westington Mill, Chipping Campden, editor of the Catholic Herald, he is in remainder to his grandfather's earldom.

Robert Noel was educated at Ampleforth College, Exeter College, Oxford (MA) and St Edmund's College, Cambridge (MPhil).

== Career ==
Noel trained as a shipbroker, then as a library assistant at the College of Arms before joining the auctioneers, Christie's of London.

Appointed Bluemantle Pursuivant of Arms at the College of Arms on 27 October 1992, he succeeded Sir Peter Gwynn-Jones as Lancaster Herald of Arms in Ordinary on 21 September 1999. On 6 April 2021, he was promoted Norroy and Ulster King of Arms in succession to Timothy Duke. In that role, he proclaimed the accession of Charles III from Hillsborough Castle, and took part in the Royal Procession at the Coronation of Charles III and Camilla in May 2023. On 28 October 2024, he was appointed Clarenceux King of Arms upon Timothy Duke's retirement.

A Freeman of the City of London, Noel is a Liveryman of the Glaziers' Company and serves as Genealogist of the Imperial Society of Knights Bachelor.

Noel was appointed a Lieutenant of the Royal Victorian Order in the 2025 Birthday Honours.

== Personal life ==
In 2013, Noel married Rowena Hale, daughter of Dennis Hale; having a son and a daughter.

== Arms ==
Coat of arms of Robert John Baptist Noel
Notes Established by Gerard Noel Edward pursuant to a Royal Licence allowing him to take and bear the arms of Noel and use the surname Noel only. Adopted 22 May 1798 Crest A Buck at gaze Argent attired Or. Escutcheon Or fretty Gules a Canton Ermine. Motto Tout bien ou rien ("Do it well or not at all") Other elements As Clarenceux, Noel can impale his arms of office (dexter) with his family arms (sinister):

== See also ==
- College of Arms
- Earl of Gainsborough
- Genealogy
- Heraldry

Heraldic offices
Preceded by Terence McCarthy	Bluemantle Pursuivant; 1992 – 1999	Succeeded by Peter O'Donoghue
Preceded by Sir Peter Gwynn-Jones	Lancaster Herald; 1999 – 2021	Succeeded by Adam Tuck
Preceded by Timothy Duke	Norroy and Ulster King of Arms; 2021 – 2024	Succeeded by Clive Cheesman
Preceded by Timothy Duke	Clarenceux King of Arms; 2024 – present	Incumbent
