= Arthur Noel, 4th Earl of Gainsborough =

British peer

The Right Honourable The Earl of Gainsborough OBE, TD
- Born: 30 June 1884
- Died: 27 August 1927 (aged 43)
- Occupation: Aristocrat
- Spouse: Alice Mary Eyre (m. 1915)
- Children: 3, including Anthony and Gerard
- Parent(s): Charles Noel, 3rd Earl of Gainsborough; Mary Elizabeth Dease

Arthur Edward Joseph Noel, 4th Earl of Gainsborough OBE TD (30 June 1884 – 27 August 1927) was a British peer.

== Early life ==
Arthur Noel was the son of Charles Noel, 3rd Earl of Gainsborough and his wife Mary Elizabeth Dease, (her sister was the writer Alice Dease), and a great-great-grandson of King William IV. He succeeded to the earldom on his father's death in 1926.

== Career ==
In 1903 Viscount Campden was commissioned in the Territorial Army Reserve in the Gloucestershire Regiment and fought in France in the First World War as a major. He was decorated with the Territorial Decoration (TD) and was invested as an Officer of the Order of the British Empire (OBE) in 1919. He was Private Chamberlain to Pope Benedict XV and Pope Pius XI.

Gainsborough was a Justice of the Peace (JP) for Rutland.

== Personal life and death ==
Gainsborough married Alice Mary Eyre on 10 November 1915. They had three children:

- Lady Maureen Thérèse Josephine Noel (born 7 March 1917, died 25 November 2009), married firstly Charles Walter James Dormer, 15th Baron Dormer and secondly Peregrine Edward Launcelot Fellowes through whom she was the step-mother of Julian Kitchener-Fellowes, Baron Fellowes of West Stafford.
- Anthony Gerard Edward Noel, 5th Earl of Gainsborough (born 24 October 1923, died 29 December 2009)
- Gerard Eyre Wriothesley Noel (born 20 November 1926, died 27 July 2016), a former editor of The Catholic Herald.

Gainsborough died on 27 August 1927, aged 43 and was succeeded in the earldom and other titles by his elder son, Anthony.

== Ancestry ==
Ancestors of Arthur Noel, 4th Earl of Gainsborough

16. Sir Gerard Noel, 2nd Baronet of the Navy
8. Charles Noel, 1st Earl of Gainsborough
17. Diana Middleton, 2nd Baroness Barham
4. Charles Noel, 2nd Earl of Gainsborough
18. Sir George Grey, 1st Baronet of Fallodon
9. Elizabeth Grey
19. Mary Whitbread
2. Charles Noel, 3rd Earl of Gainsborough
20. William Hay, 17th Earl of Erroll
10. William Hay, 18th Earl of Erroll
21. Alicia Eliot
5. Lady Ida Hay
22. William IV of the United Kingdom
11. Elizabeth Fitzclarence
23. Dorothea Jordan
1. Arthur Noel, 4th Earl of Gainsborough
24. James Dease
12. Gerald Dease
25. Lady Theresa Plunkett
6. James Dease
26. Edmund O'Callaghan
13. Elizabeth O'Callaghan
27. Ellen O'Brien
3. Mary Dease
28. William Jerningham
14. Edmund Jerningham
29. Anna Wright
7. Charlotte Jerningham
30. Christopher Waterton
15. Matilda Waterton
31. Anne Waddell

Peerage of the United Kingdom
Preceded by Charles William Francis Noel	Earl of Gainsborough; 1926–1927	Succeeded by Anthony Gerard Edward Noel
