= Charles Noel, 3rd Earl of Gainsborough =

British peer and soldier

The Right Honourable The Earl of Gainsborough DL

Personal details
- Born: 20 October 1850
- Died: 17 April 1926 (aged 75)
- Spouses: Augusta Mary Catherine Berkeley (m. 1876; died 1877) Mary Elizabeth Dease (m. 1880)
- Relations: See Noel family
- Children: 6, including the 4th Earl of Gainsborough
- Parent(s): 2nd Earl of Gainsborough; Lady Ida Harriet Augusta

Charles William Francis Noel, 3rd Earl of Gainsborough DL (20 October 1850 – 17 April 1926) was a British peer and soldier.

== Early life ==
Charles was born on 20 October 1850. He was the son of Charles Noel, 2nd Earl of Gainsborough, a Member of Parliament for Rutland, and Lady Ida Harriet Augusta, who died in 1867. Among his siblings was Lady Constance, who married Sir Henry Bellingham, 4th Baronet.

His father was the son of Charles Noel, 1st Earl of Gainsborough, and his second wife Elizabeth, herself the daughter of Sir George Grey, 1st Baronet. His mother was the daughter of William Hay, 18th Earl of Erroll and Elizabeth FitzClarence, an illegitimate daughter of King William IV and Dorothea Jordan. His nephew (the son of his younger brother Edward) was Lieutenant-Colonel Edward Noel, a British spy active in the Caucasus and Caspian area during the Russian Revolution.

== Career ==
Gainsborough gained the rank of Lieutenant in the 10th Hussars, and held the office of Justice of the Peace for Worcestershire, Justice of the Peace for Gloucestershire, Justice of the Peace for Rutland, and Deputy Lieutenant of Rutland.

=== Peerage ===
He succeeded his father to the earldom in 1881, as well as his subsidiary titles: the 5th Baron Barham, of Barham Court and Teston, Kent, the 3rd Viscount Campden of Campden, co. Gloucester, 5th Baronet Middleton, of Barham Court and Teston, Kent, and the 3rd Baron Noel of Ridlington, co. Rutland. At the same time he also inherited 18,000 acres.

== Personal life ==
On 9 May 1876, he married, firstly, to Augusta Mary Catherine Berkeley (d. 1877), the daughter of Robert Berkeley of Spetchley Park and granddaughter of the 3rd Earl of Kenmare. They had one daughter:

- Lady Agnes Mary Catherine Noel (1877–1915), who died unmarried and without issue.

After the death of his first wife, he married, secondly, to Mary Elizabeth Dease (d. 1937), daughter of James Arthur Dease of Turbotson, on 2 Feb 1880. Together they were the parents of five children:

- Lady Norah Ida Emily Noel (1881–1939), who married Robert Charles Graf Bentinck, 6th Count Bentinck (1875–1932) in 1915.
- Lady Clare Mary Charlotte Noel (1882–1962), who married Charles Mervyn King (d. 1965) in 1902.
- Arthur Edward Joseph Noel (1884–1927), who married Alice Mary Eyre in 1915 and succeeded his father as the 4th Earl of Gainsborough.
- Charles Hubert Francis Noel (1885–1947), who married May Dick, daughter of Brig. Gen. Archibald Campbell Douglas Dick, of Pitkerro.
- Robert Edmund Thomas More Noel (1888–1918).

Gainsborough died on 17 April 1926 and was succeeded in his earldom by his eldest son, Arthur.

=== Descendants ===
Through his eldest daughter, he was the grandfather of Brydgytte Blanche Bentinck (1916–2010), who married Jonkheer Adrian Hendrik Sibble van der Wyck (1906–1973) on 2 February 1937 in London, with whom she had five children; and Henry Noel Bentinck, who later became the 11th Earl of Portland upon the death of his distant cousin, the 9th Duke of Portland.

Through his second daughter, Lady Clare, he was the grandfather of Agnes Celestria Mary King (1917–1946), who married Charles Guy Vaughan-Lee.

Through his son Arthur, he was the grandfather of Lady Maureen Noel (1917–2009), who married Charles Dormer, 15th Baron Dormer; Anthony Noel, 5th Earl of Gainsborough (1923–2009); and Gerard Noel (1926–2016), a former editor of The Catholic Herald.

Peerage of the United Kingdom
Preceded by Charles George Noel	Earl of Gainsborough; 1881–1926	Succeeded by Arthur Edward Joseph Noel
