= Victor Hay, 21st Earl of Erroll =

British diplomat and writer

The Right Honourable The Earl of Erroll KCMG
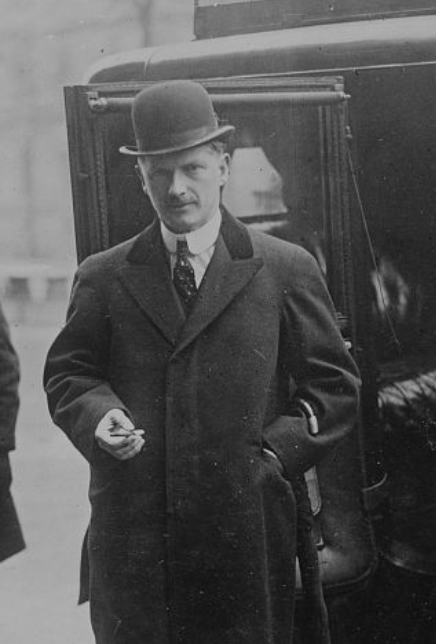
- Photograph of Lord Kilmarnock, 1920

British High Commissioner to the Inter-Allied Rhineland High Commission
- In office 1 December 1921 – 20 February 1928
- Preceded by: Sir Malcolm Robertson
- Succeeded by: William Seeds

Personal details
- Born: Victor Alexander Sereld Hay; 17 October 1876 Kensington, London, England
- Died: 20 February 1928 (aged 51) Koblenz, Allied-occupied Rhineland, Germany
- Spouse: Mary Lucy Victoria Mackenzie (m. 1900)
- Children: Josslyn Hay, 22nd Earl of Erroll; Gilbert Boyd, 6th Baron Kilmarnock; Lady Rosemary Hay
- Parent(s): Charles Hay, 20th Earl of Erroll; Mary Caroline L'Estrange
- Relatives: William Harry Hay, 19th Earl of Erroll (grandfather); Diana Hay, 23rd Countess of Erroll (granddaughter)

Victor Alexander Sereld Hay, 21st Earl of Erroll and 4th Baron Kilmarnock, KCMG (17 October 1876 – 20 February 1928), styled Lord Kilmarnock from 1891 to 1927, was a British diplomat, a writer and briefly a member of the House of Lords, who was "noted for his tact and charm."

== Early life ==
Erroll was the first son of Charles Hay, 20th Earl of Erroll (1852–1927) and his wife Mary Caroline L'Estrange. He was a godson of Queen Victoria and a favourite of George V and Queen Mary, who often invited him to Balmoral Castle.

Through his paternal grandfather, the 19th Earl of Erroll, he was a direct descendant of William IV (his great-grandmother Elizabeth Hay, Countess of Erroll, wife of the 18th Earl of Erroll, was King William's daughter by his mistress Dorothea Jordan). His maternal grandfather was General the Hon. Sir Charles Stephen Gore, KH, GCB, a Waterloo officer (who was a son of the 2nd Earl of Arran and brother to the Duchess of Inverness). His maternal grandparents were Edmund L'Estrange and Lady Harriett L'Estrange (sister of Richard Lumley, 9th Earl of Scarbrough, and daughter of Frederick Lumley-Savile and of Charlotte De la Poer-Beresford, a daughter of George de la Poer Beresford, Bishop of Kilmore).

== Career ==
The young Hay entered the diplomatic service and was promoted Attaché, 1900, Third Secretary in July 1902, Second Secretary, 1906, First Secretary, 1913. He was First Secretary in Copenhagen, 1918–19, then briefly Chargé d'Affaires in Berlin, on the United Kingdom's resumption of diplomatic relations with Germany in 1920, until the arrival of a British Ambassador. He remained in Berlin as Counsellor until November, 1921, and served finally as British High Commissioner to the Inter-Allied Rhineland High Commission, from December 1921 until his death in February 1928.

He was also an author and belonged to the St James's Club. He had two plays published and produced in London, The Dream Kios and The Anonymous Letter.

He succeeded his father in the earldom in 1927.

== Personal life ==
In 1900, he married Mary Lucy Victoria Mackenzie, only daughter of Sir Allan Mackenzie, 2nd Baronet, of Glen Muick, Aberdeenshire. She inherited a fortune made by her grandfather in the indigo trade in India. Together, they were the parents of two sons and one daughter:

- Josslyn Victor Hay, 22nd Earl of Erroll (1901–1941), who married Lady Idina Sackville, daughter of the 8th Earl De La Warr, in 1923.
- Gilbert Boyd, 6th Baron Kilmarnock (1903–1975), who married The Hon. Rosemary Guest, daughter of Ivor Guest, 1st Viscount Wimborne. He married, secondly, Denise Coker. He changed his surname to Boyd in 1941 to inherit the barony of Kilmarnock after the death of his brother without male issue. He was the father of Alastair Boyd, 7th Baron Kilmarnock.
- Lady Rosemary Constance Ferelith Hay (15 May 1904 – 19 May 1944), who married Lt.-Col. Rupert Ryan and divorced him. She married, secondly, Maj. James Gresham.

He held the earldom only briefly, and was succeeded by his elder son, Lord Kilmarnock, in 1928. Today, his son and heir is best known for the unsolved case surrounding his murder and the sensation it caused during wartime in Britain.

=== Shooting incident ===
On Wednesday 31 August 1910, Lord Kilmarnock was one of a shooting party at Balmoral, with George V and friends. Captain Hood (later to become a rear admiral) accidentally shot Kilmarnock, who was in a shooting butt near him. Kilmarnock's glasses were broken, and he sustained a "slight abrasion". The Buchan Observer reported:

It appears that the accident happened about two o'clock in the afternoon, and that Captain Hood was in the next butt to his Lordship. Captain Hood got on to the line of a bird just crossing between his butt and that of Lord Kilmarnock who was facing him. When the trigger was pulled Lord Kilmarnock at once shouted to his companion who ceased firing immediately. At the close of the drive he reported the accident to the King, who expressed sympathy with both Lord Kilmarnock and Captain Hood. His Lordship continued shooting all the afternoon, and it was not until after dinner that Dr Mitchell was sent for. Captain Hood, who was greatly upset at the accident, left the hill and returned to Braemar a short time after the occurrence.

There followed "exaggerated reports" of the incident, which Kilmarnock denied, saying that he dined with the king on the Thursday night. One of those reports, by The Darling Downs Gazette (Toowoomba), reported that it was George V who had shot Kilmarnock, that Kilmarnock was "badly wounded", and that "the most desperate efforts have been made to hush the whole thing up".

== Publications ==
- Ferelith, 1903
- The Dream Kiss (play), produced at the Wimbledon Theatre, 1924
- The Anonymous Letter (play), produced at Q Theatre, 1927

== Ancestry ==
Ancestors of Victor Hay, 21st Earl of Erroll

16. William Hay, 17th Earl of Erroll (1772 – 1819)
8. William Hay, 18th Earl of Erroll (1801 - 1846)
17. Alicia Eliot (1778 - 1812)
4. William Harry Hay, 19th Earl of Erroll (1823 - 1891)
18. William IV, King of the United Kingdom
9. Lady Elizabeth FitzClarence (1801 - 1856)
19. Dorothea Jordan (1761 - 1816)
2. Charles Hay, 20th Earl of Erroll (1852 - 1927)
20. Arthur Gore, 2nd Earl of Arran, KP (1734 - 1809)
10. Gen. the Hon. Sir Charles Stephen Gore, KH, GCB (1793 – 1869)
21. Elizabeth Underwood ( - 1829)
5. Eliza Amelia Gore (1829 - 1916)
22. Hon. James Fraser (1759 - 1822), member of the Executive Council of Nova Scotia
11. Sarah Rachel Fraser (1824 - 1880)
23. Rachel Otis DeWolf (1773 - 1815)
1. Victor Hay, 21st Earl of Erroll
24. Henry Peisley L'Estrange, of Moystown (1732 - 1796)
12. Col. Henry Peisley L'Estrange, of Moystown (1776 - 1824)
25. Mary Carleton
6. Edmund L'Estrange (1813 - 1866)
26. George Burdett (1735 - 1817)
13. Grace Burdett
27. Jane Frend
3. Mary Caroline L'Estrange (1849 - 1934)
28. Hon. Frederick Lumley-Saunderson (1761 - 1831)
14. Frederick Lumley-Savile (1788 - 1837)
29. Harriet Boddington ( - 1810)
7. Lady Harriet Susan Beresford Lumley-Savile (1823 - 1904)
30. George De la Poer-Beresford, bishop of Kilmore (1765 - 1841)
15. Charlotte De la Poer-Beresford ( - 1851)
31. Frances Bushe

Peerage of Scotland
Preceded by Charles Gore Hay	Earl of Erroll; 1927–1928	Succeeded by Josslyn Victor Hay
