= Anthony Noel, 6th Earl of Gainsborough =

British peer (born 1950)

The Right Honourable The Earl of Gainsborough

Personal details
- Born: Anthony Baptist Noel; 17 January 1950 (age 76)
- Spouse: Sarah Rose Winnington (after 1972)
- Relations: Arthur Noel, 4th Earl of Gainsborough (grandfather); Gerard Noel (uncle)
- Children: Harry Noel, Viscount Campden
- Parent(s): Anthony Noel, 5th Earl of Gainsborough; Mary Stourton
- Education: Ampleforth College
- Alma mater: Royal Agricultural University

Anthony Baptist Noel, 6th Earl of Gainsborough (born 17 January 1950), styled as Viscount Campden between 1950 and 2009, is a British peer.

== Early life ==
Lord Gainsborough was born on 17 January 1950. He was the eldest son of eight children born to the former Mary Stourton and Anthony Noel, 5th Earl of Gainsborough. Among his siblings are Lady Juliana (who married Edward Foljambe, 5th Earl of Liverpool).

His maternal grandfather was Maj. John Joseph Stourton (son of Charles Stourton, 24th Baron Mowbray). His paternal grandparents were Arthur Noel, 4th Earl of Gainsborough and the former Alice Mary Eyre. His uncle, Gerard Eyre Wriothesley Noel, was a former editor of The Catholic Herald.

He was educated at Ampleforth College in North Yorkshire before attending the Royal Agricultural University in Cirencester, Gloucestershire.

== Career ==
Upon his father's death in 2009, he became the 6th Earl of Gainsborough and inherited Exton Hall on the western edge of the village of Exton, Rutland. His father had been the largest landowner in Rutland and had fought to prevent its absorption by neighbouring Leicestershire, and was eventually vindicated when the 1974 takeover was reversed with the return of Rutland County Council in 1997.

== Personal life ==
On 23 May 1972, he was married to Sarah Rose Winnington LVO DL (b. 1951), who later became a Lady-in-Waiting to Diana, Princess of Wales. A sister of Sir Anthony Winnington, 7th Baronet, Sarah is the eldest surviving daughter of Col. Thomas Foley Churchill Winnington (second son of Francis Salway Winnington and the former Blanche Emma Casberd-Boteler). Her great-grandparents were Sir Francis Winnington, 5th Baronet and Jane Spencer-Churchill (eldest daughter of Lt.-Col. Lord Alfred Spencer-Churchill, the second son of George Spencer-Churchill, 6th Duke of Marlborough). Together, they are the parents of:

- Henry "Harry" Robert Anthony Noel, styled Viscount Campden (b. 1977), who married Zara van Cutsem (b. 1978), a daughter of Geoffrey Neil van Cutsem and the former Sally McCorquodale.

In 2003, he resided at Earl's Court in London.

=== Descendants ===
Through his only son Harry, he is a grandfather of three: Edward Noel (b. 2007), Violet Ruth Noel (b. 2009), and William Henry Noel (b. 2015).

Peerage of the United Kingdom
Preceded by Anthony Gerard Edward Noel	Earl of Gainsborough; 2009–present	Incumbent; Heir apparent: Henry Robert Anthony Noel
