= William Hay, 19th Earl of Erroll =

Scottish peer (1823–1891)

The Right Honourable The Earl of Erroll
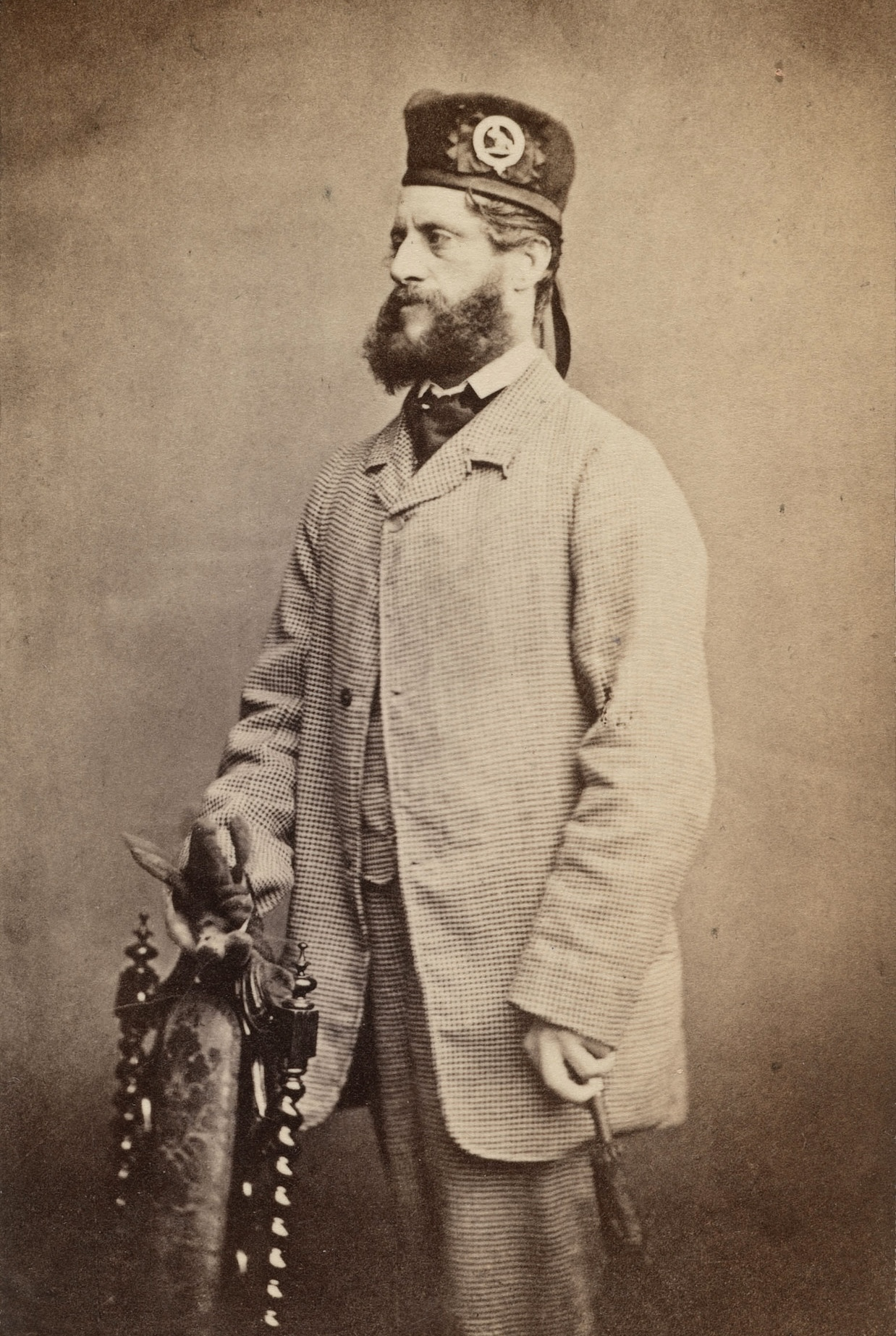
- The Earl of Erroll, c. 1872

Page of Honour
- In office 1832–1839
- Monarchs: William IV (1832–1837); Queen Victoria (1837–1839)
- Preceded by: Arthur Somerset
- Succeeded by: Hon. Adolphus Chichester

Personal details
- Born: William Harry Hay; 3 May 1823
- Died: 3 December 1891 (aged 68)
- Spouse: Eliza Amelia Gore (m. 1848)
- Children: 7, including Charles
- Parent(s): William Hay, 18th Earl of Erroll; Lady Elizabeth FitzClarence
- Relatives: William IV (grandfather); Dorothea Jordan (grandmother); William Hay, 17th Earl of Erroll (grandfather)

William Harry Hay, 19th Earl of Erroll (3 May 1823 – 3 December 1891), styled Lord Hay between 1823 and 1831, and Lord Kilmarnock from 1831 to 1846, was a Scottish peer.

== Early life ==
William Harry Hay was born on 3 May 1823. He was the only son of four children born to Lady Elizabeth FitzClarence and William Hay, 18th Earl of Erroll. His elder sister, Lady Ida Hay, married Charles Noel, 2nd Earl of Gainsborough (her descendants include the Earls of Gainsborough, the Marquesses of Bute and the Baronets of Bellingham). His younger sisters were Lady Agnes Hay, wife of James Duff, 5th Earl Fife (her son, Alexander Duff, 1st Duke of Fife, married Princess Louise, daughter of King Edward VII), and Lady Alice Hay, who married Charles Edward Louis Casimir Stuart, Count d'Albanie (nephew of fraud John Sobieski Stuart).

His paternal grandparents were William Hay, 17th Earl of Erroll and, his second wife, the former Alicia Eliot (third daughter of Samuel Eliot of Antigua). His mother was the illegitimate daughter of King William IV by his mistress, the famous comic actress Dora Bland (who was known as "Mrs. Jordan"). His maternal aunts and uncles were George FitzClarence, 1st Earl of Munster, Henry FitzClarence, Sophia FitzClarence (wife of Philip Sidney, 1st Baron De L'Isle and Dudley), Mary FitzClarence (wife of Charles Richard Fox), Lord Frederick FitzClarence, Lord Adolphus FitzClarence, Augusta FitzClarence, Lord Augustus FitzClarence, and Amelia FitzClarence (wife of Lucius Cary, 10th Viscount Falkland).

== Career ==
Lord Erroll served as the third Page of Honour from 1832 to 1839 (for his grandfather, King William IV, from 1832 to 1837, and for Queen Victoria, his grandfather's niece, from 1837 to 1839).

From 1841 to 1860, he served in the British Army.

== Personal life ==
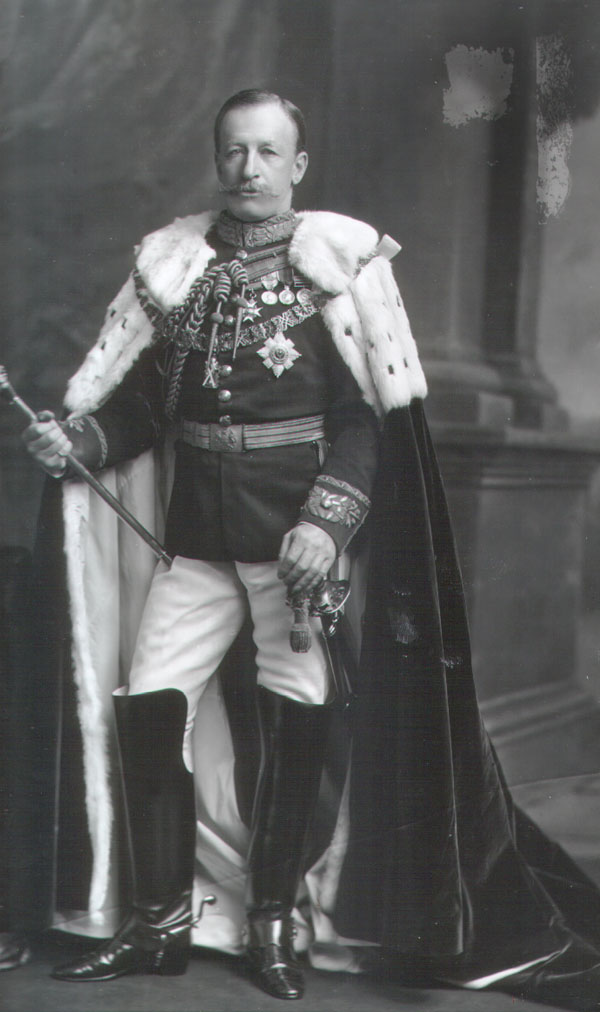
His son Charles Hay, 20th Earl of Erroll as Lord High Constable of Scotland, 1902.

On 20 September 1848, he was married to Eliza Amelia Gore (1829–1916), the eldest daughter of Gen. Hon. Sir Charles Stephen Gore (the third son, by his second wife, of Arthur Gore, 2nd Earl of Arran) and the former Sarah Rachel Fraser (eldest daughter of James Fraser, a member of the Council of Nova Scotia). (Note: Eliza's aunt, Sarah Otis (née DeWolf) Thomas, was married to Maj. Nathaniel Ray Thomas Jr., the Collector of Customs at Windsor, who was a first cousin of Lady Frances Wentworth, best known for her affair with Lord Erroll's grandfather, Price William Henry, the Duke of Clarence, later King William IV).) The Countess of Erroll served as a Lady of the Bedchamber to Queen Alexandra (wife of King Edward VII) beginning in 1872. Together, they were the parents of seven children:

- Hon. Charles Gore Hay, Master of Erroll, styled Lord Kilmarnock (1850–1850), who died in infancy.
- Charles Gore Hay, 20th Earl of Erroll (1852–1927), who married Mary Caroline L'Estrange, youngest daughter of Edmund L'Estrange of Tynte Lodge.
- Capt. Hon. Arthur Hay (1855–1932), who served in Egypt in 1882 and Burma in 1887 and was a Gentleman Usher from 1896 to 1925; he was awarded CVO.
- Lady Florence Alice Hay (1858–1859), who died young.
- Lady Cecilia Leila Hay (1860–1935), married Capt. George Allan Webbe of Errollston (d. 19 Feb 1925), in 1883.
- Hon. Francis Hay (1864–1898), a Page of Honour.
- Lady Florence Agnes Adelaide Hay (1872–1935), who married Maj. Henry Wolrige-Gordon (d. 1923) in 1895.

Lord Erroll died on 3 December 1891. His widow, the Dowager Countess of Erroll, died on 11 March 1916.

=== Descendants ===
Through his eldest surviving son Charles, he was a grandfather of Victor Alexander Sereld Hay, who died in 1928 a year after becoming the 21st Earl of Erroll.

Court offices
Preceded by Arthur Somerset	Page of Honour; 1832–1839	Succeeded by Hon. Adolphus Chichester
Peerage of Scotland
Preceded by William Hay	Earl of Erroll; 1846–1891	Succeeded by Charles Hay
