= Charles Noel =

Charles Noel may refer to:

- Charles Noel, 1st Earl of Gainsborough (1781–1866), a.k.a. Charles Edwardes and Lord Barham; British peer and Whig politician
- Charles Noel, 2nd Earl of Gainsborough (1818–1881), a.k.a. Viscount Campden, British peer and Whig politician
- Charles Noel, 3rd Earl of Gainsborough (1850–1926), British peer and Member of Parliament

== See also ==
- Noel (surname)
