= Charles Hay, 20th Earl of Erroll =

Scottish soldier and politician (1852–1927)

Major-General The Right Honourable The Earl of Erroll KT CB DL
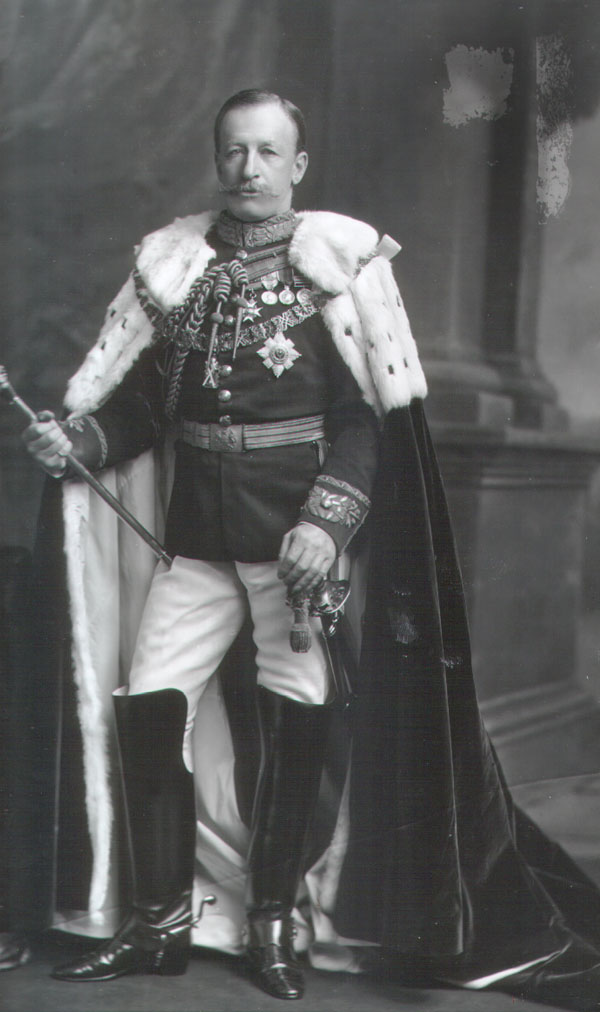
- Lord Erroll as Lord High Constable of Scotland, 1902

Personal details
- Born: Charles Gore Hay; 7 February 1852
- Died: 8 July 1927 (aged 75)
- Party: Conservative
- Spouse: Mary Caroline L'Estrange (m. 1875)
- Children: 3, including Victor
- Parent(s): William Harry Hay, 19th Earl of Erroll; Eliza Amelia Gore
- Relatives: William IV (great-grandfather); William Hay, 18th Earl of Erroll (grandfather); Elizabeth Hay, Countess of Erroll (grandmother)

Military service
- Allegiance: United Kingdom
- Branch/service: British Army
- Years of service: 1869–1916
- Rank: Major-General
- Commands: Royal Horse Guards; 65th (2nd Lowland) Division
- Battles/wars: Second Boer War: Battle of Paardeberg; Battle of Faber's Put; First World War
- Awards: Companion of the Order of the Bath

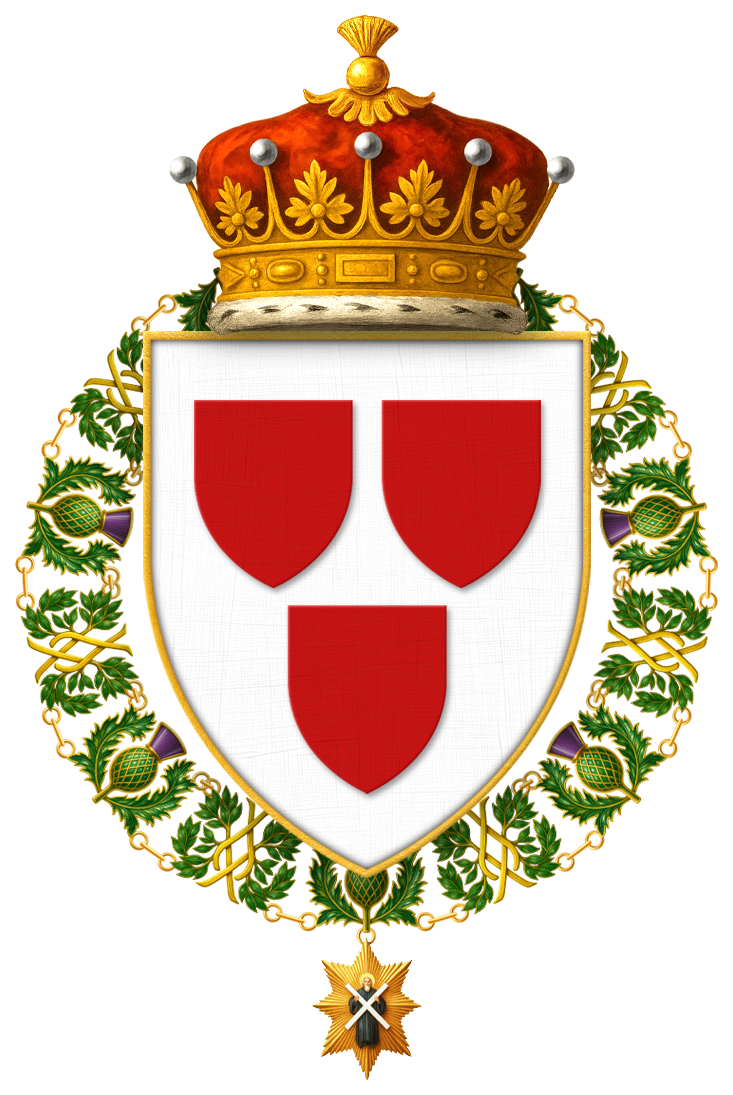
Shield of Arms of Charles Gordon Hay, 20th Earl of Erroll, KT, CB, DL

Major-General Charles Gordon Hay, 20th Earl of Erroll, KT, CB, DL (7 February 1852 – 8 July 1927), styled Lord Kilmarnock until 1891, was a Scottish soldier and Conservative politician.

== Early life ==
Hay was the eldest surviving son of eight children born to Eliza Amelia Gore and William Harry Hay, 19th Earl of Erroll. His paternal grandparents were William Hay, 18th Earl of Erroll and Elizabeth Hay, Countess of Erroll (the illegitimate daughter of William IV by his mistress Dorothea Jordan). His maternal grandfather was General the Hon. Sir Charles Stephen Gore, a Waterloo officer (who was a son of the 2nd Earl of Arran and brother to the Duchess of Inverness).

== Military career ==
Hay was commissioned a second lieutenant in the Royal Horse Guards on 7 July 1869. He was promoted to lieutenant on 19 August 1871, to captain on 11 September 1875, to major on 1 July 1881, to lieutenant-colonel on 24 September 1887, and to colonel on 18 January 1895.

Following the outbreak of the Second Boer War in late 1899, he volunteered for active service and was commissioned in the Imperial Yeomanry. He was appointed an assistant adjutant-general for the cavalry division in South Africa on 18 January 1900, took part in the Battle of Paardeberg (February 1900), following which he was in charge of prisoners from Piet Cronjé's army. In early March 1900 he took command of a yeomanry brigade in the South Africa Field Force, with the rank of brigadier general. The following year he was in June 1901 appointed Assistant Adjutant-General (temporary). He was later an honorary major general in the British Army and a lieutenant colonel commanding the Royal Horse Guards. He went on to serve as General Officer Commanding 65th (2nd Lowland) Division between 1915 and 1916.

== Peerage and political career ==
Hay succeeded his father in the earldom in 1891. Lord Erroll served in the Conservative administration of Arthur Balfour as a Lord-in-waiting (government whip in the House of Lords) from 1903 to 1905. In 1901 he was made a Knight of the Order of the Thistle.

== Personal life ==
In 1875, Hay married Mary Caroline L'Estrange, daughter of Edmund L'Estrange by his wife Harriet Susan Beresford Lumley-Savile (sister of Richard Lumley, 9th Earl of Scarbrough, and daughter of Frederick Lumley-Savile and of Charlotte De la Poer-Beresford, a daughter of George de la Poer Beresford, Bishop of Kilmore). Together, they were the parents of three sons:

- Victor Alexander Sereld Hay, 21st Earl of Erroll (1876–1928), who married Mary Lucy Victoria, only daughter of Sir Allan Mackenzie, 2nd Baronet, in 1900.
- Cmdr. Hon. Sereld Mordaunt Alan Josslyn Hay (1877–1939), who married Violet Spiller, second daughter of Lt.-Col. Duncan Chisholm Oliver Spiller, in 1915.
- Capt. Hon. Ivan Josslyn Lumley Hay (1884–1936), a Page of Honour who married Pamela Burroughes, a daughter of Francis George Burroughes of Blakeney Holt, in 1921.

Hay died in July 1927, aged 75, and was succeeded in the earldom by his eldest son, Victor, who held the title for less than a year before his death on 20 February 1928 when he was succeeded by his eldest son, Josslyn. Lady Erroll died in 1934.

=== Descendants ===
Through his eldest son, and heir, Victor, he was a grandfather of Josslyn Hay, 22nd Earl of Erroll (who married Lady Myra Sackville, daughter of the Earl De La Warr), Gilbert Boyd, 6th Baron Kilmarnock (who married firstly The Hon. Rosemary Guest, daughter of Viscount Wimborne), and Lady Rosemary Hay, who (married Lieutenant Colonel Rupert Ryan and, secondly Major James Gresham).

Peerage of Scotland
| Preceded by William Hay | Earl of Erroll; 1891–1927 | Succeeded by Victor Alexander Sereld Hay |
Military offices
| New title | GOC 65th (2nd Lowland) Division; 1915–1916 | Succeeded by Theodore Stephenson |
