= Anthony Noel =

Anthony Noel may refer to:

- Anthony Noel, 5th Earl of Gainsborough (1923–2009), British peer
- Anthony Noel, 6th Earl of Gainsborough (born 1950), British peer
