= Exton Hall =

English country house in Exton, Rutland, England

Coordinates: 52.6925°N 0.6382°W

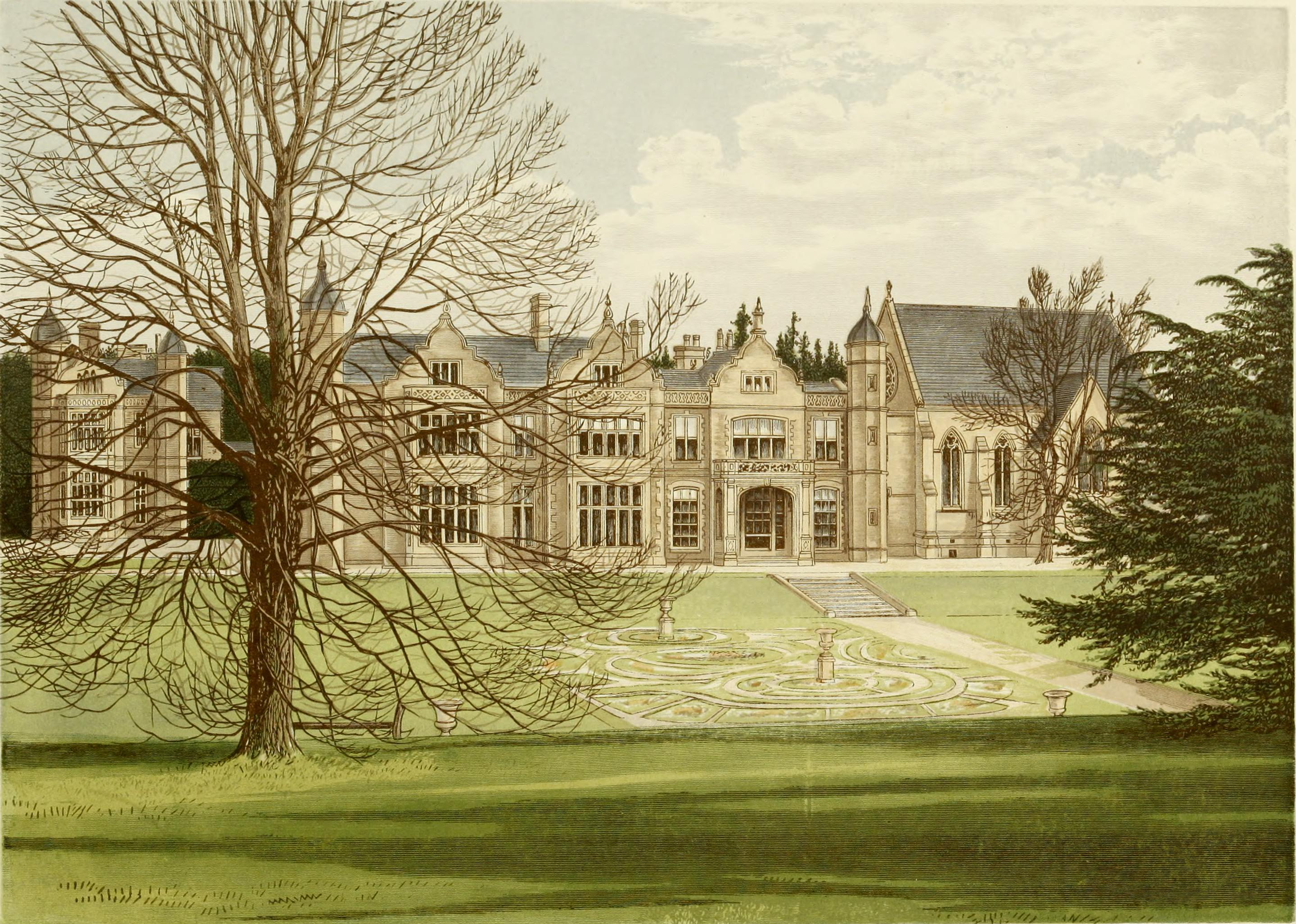
Exton House from Morris's County Seats (1879)

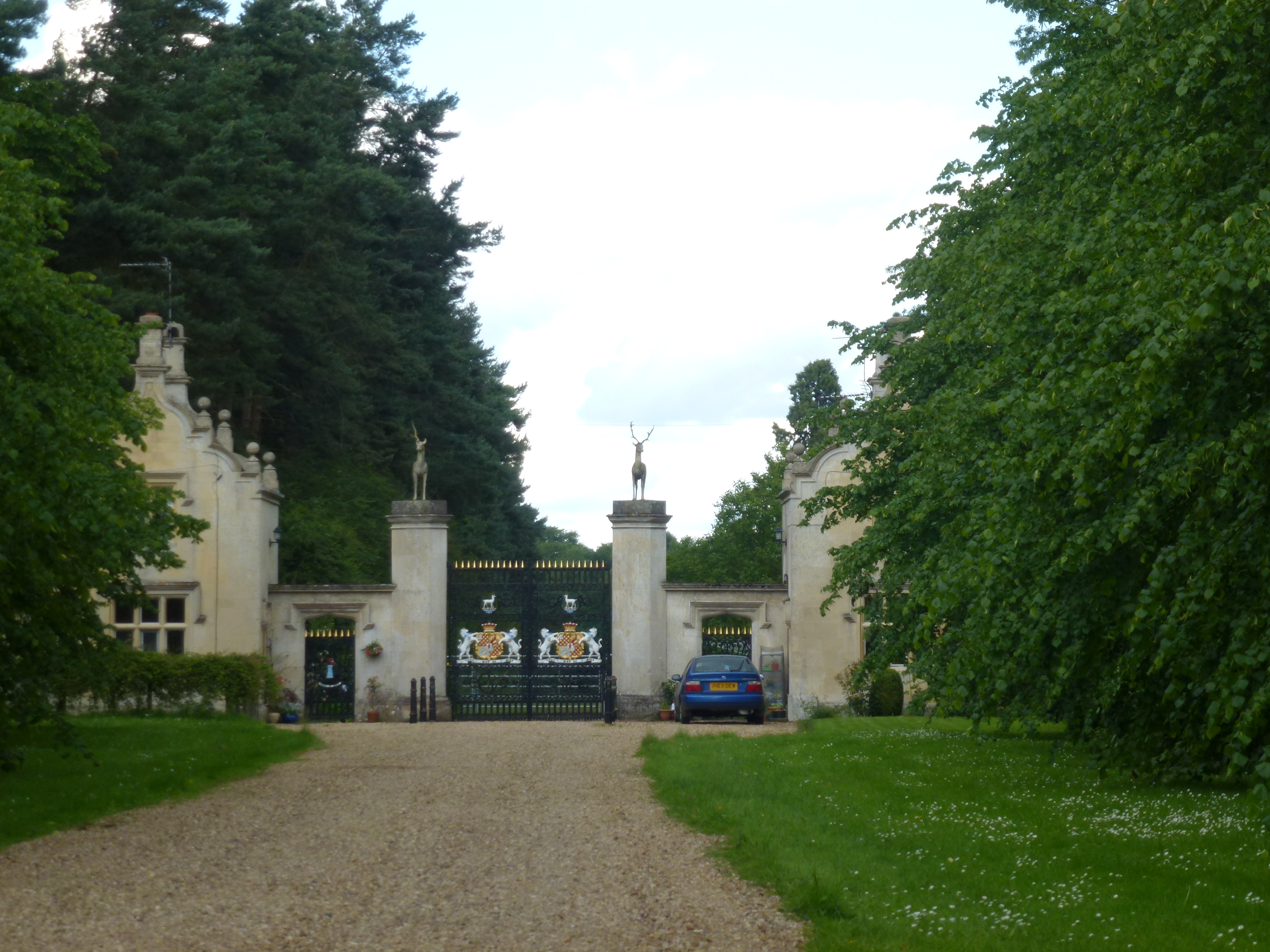
Gate to Exton Park

Exton Hall is an English country house on the western edge of the village of Exton, Rutland, England, standing in its own extensive park, and is the country seat of the Earls of Gainsborough.

== History ==
Exton Hall was previously the seat of the family of Sir James Harington. An earlier mansion, which burnt down in 1810, is now a ruin, with grand gables and beautiful chimneys, as in many Elizabethan houses. The ruins are on Historic England's Heritage at Risk Register, at priority category: C - "slow decay; no solution agreed".

The present Exton Hall was built in the 19th century close to the ruins of the original house. In 1869 a Roman Catholic chapel, dedicated to St Thomas of Canterbury was added, to a design by Charles Alban Buckler.

The house was used by elements of the U.S. Army Air Force during the Second World War.

In 1948, Anthony Noel, 5th Earl of Gainsborough, granted the United Steel Companies a lease to quarry ironstone in the Park. Sundew, the world's largest walking dragline, worked the land from 1957 until 1974, when mining ceased. Sundew then slowly walked to Corby. Material was moved by a standard-gauge railway with a loop of nine miles and a link to the exchange sidings at what is now Rutland Railway Museum's site to the West of Cottesmore Village. The railway was mostly operated by Yorkshire Engine Company steam and diesel locomotives, Yorkshire Engine Company being a United Steel Companies subsidiary.

The house is one of the stately homes of England associated with the Legend of the Mistletoe Bough. It is now the private home of Henry Noel, Viscount Campden, the son and heir of Anthony Noel, 6th Earl of Gainsborough. Although not normally open to the public, it is available for hire for a limited number of private weddings.

== Park ==
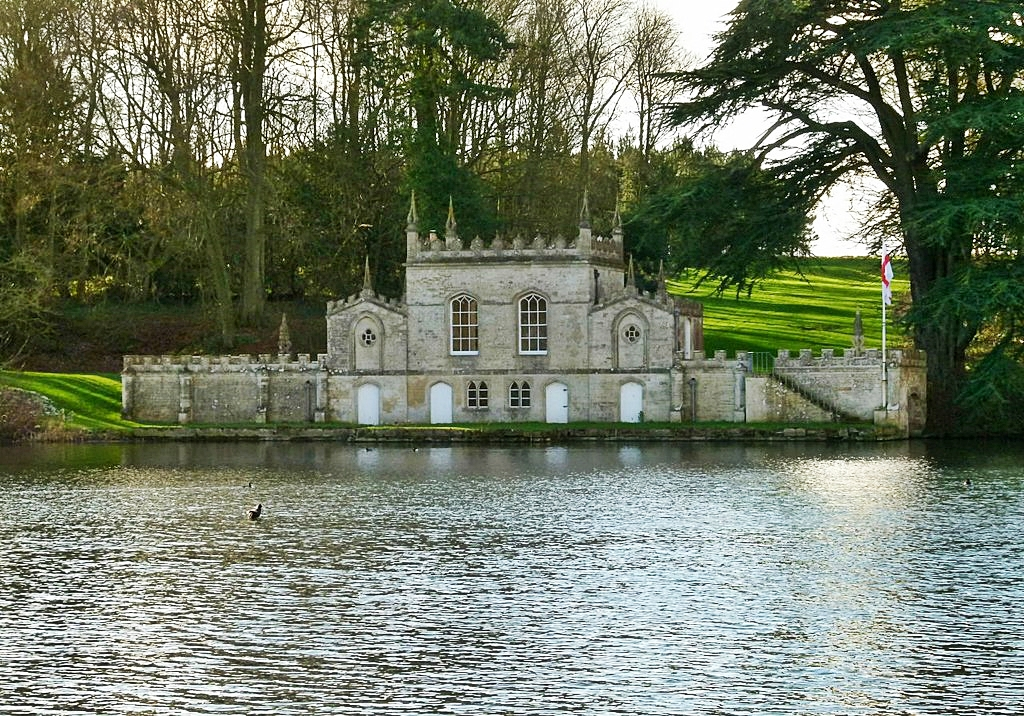
Fort Henry in Exton Park

In the park is Fort Henry, a pleasure-house built in 1788 in the Gothick style, which overlooks lakes formed by the North Brook.

There is an extensive description of the parkland surrounding the hall in its own English Heritage listing. The park is extensive and spreads across the parishes of Exton, Cottesmore, Greetham and Horn.
