= Ferelith =

1903 novel by Victor Hay, 21st Earl of Erroll

Ferelith is a gothic novel published in 1903 by Lord Kilmarnock, the courtesy title of British author and politician Victor Hay, 21st Earl of Erroll.

A new edition with an introduction by Mark Valentine was published in 2018.

== Plot ==
The novel tells the story of a woman who gives birth to a child fathered by a phantom.

== In popular culture ==
The novel is alluded to in The Rouse by author China Miéville.
