= Sir George Grey, 1st Baronet =

British Royal Navy officer (1767–1828)

Captain The Honourable Sir George Grey Bt KCB
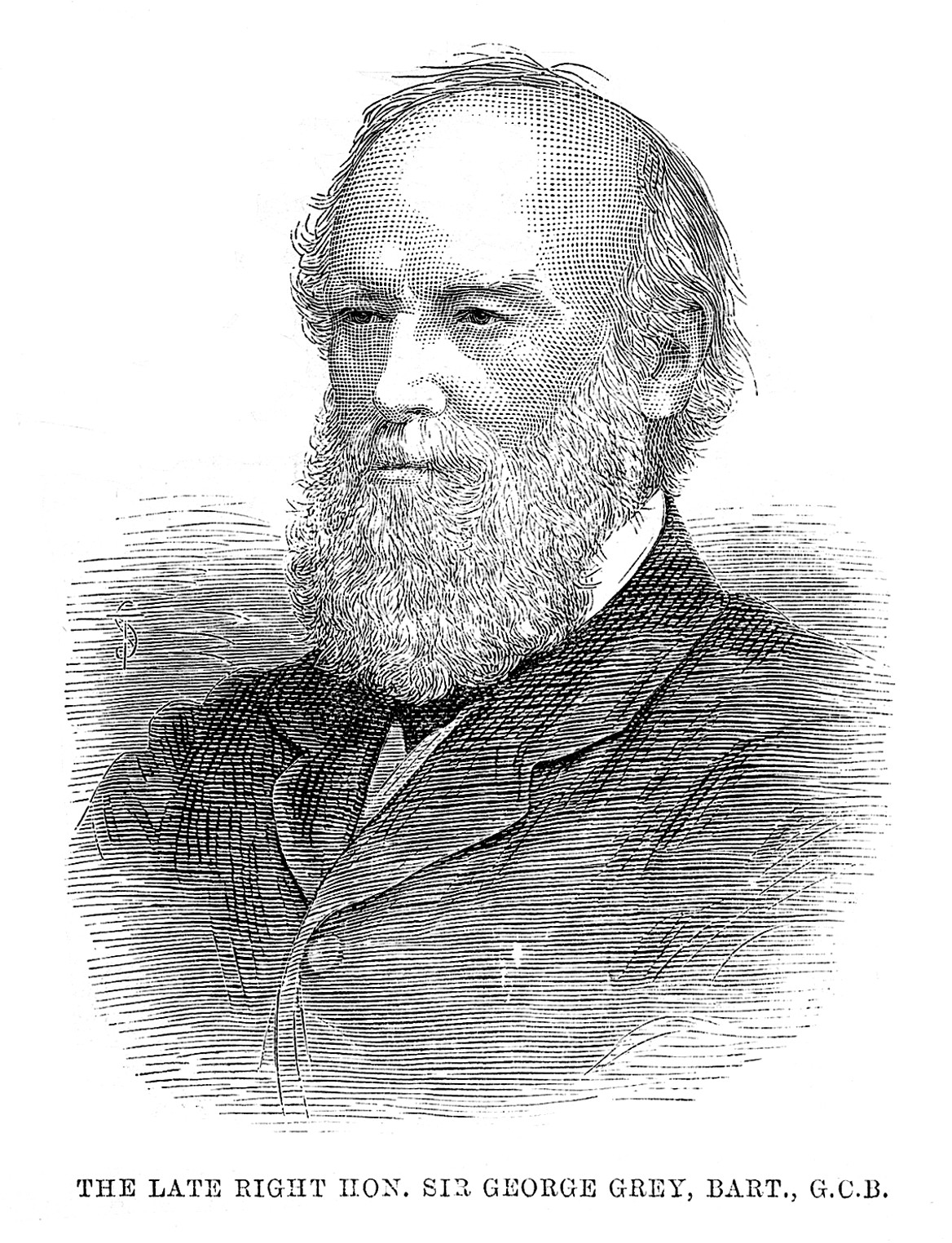
- Born: 10 October 1767; Howick, Northumberland, Great Britain
- Died: 3 October 1828 (aged 60); Portsmouth Dockyard, Great Britain
- Burial place: Royal Garrison Church, Portsmouth, Hampshire
- Relatives: House of Grey (family); Mary Whitbread (wife); Charles Grey (father); Sir George Grey (son); Charles Grey (brother)
- Military career
- Allegiance: United Kingdom
- Branch: Royal Navy
- Service years: 1781–1828
- Rank: Captain
- Commands: HMS Vesuvius (1790–1793); HMS Quebec (1793); HMS Boyne (1793–1795); HMS Victory (1796–1797); HMS Ville de Paris (1797–1798, 1800–1801); HMS Argo (1798); HMS Guerrière (1798)
- Conflicts: American War of Independence; Battle of the Saintes; French Revolutionary Wars; Invasion of Guadeloupe (1794); Battle of Cape St Vincent (1797); Napoleonic Wars
- Other work: Dockyard Commissioner, Sheerness (1804–1806); Dockyard Commissioner Portsmouth (1806–1828)

Sir George Grey, 1st Baronet, KCB (10 October 1767 – 3 October 1828) was a British Royal Navy officer. He served as Master and Commander of the Mediterranean Fleet. He joined the Royal Navy at the age of 14 and was on active service from 1781 to 1804, serving in the American War of Independence, the French Revolutionary War and the Napoleonic War.

He served as Flag Captain for John Jervis, Earl of St Vincent and later as Flag Captain for King George III on his royal yacht. From 1804 to 1806, he was Commissioner at Sheerness Dockyard, and from 1806 until his death in 1828 he was Commissioner at Portsmouth Dockyard.

== Early life ==
Grey was born at the Grey family estate of Fallodon Hall, Northumberland, on 10 October 1767, the third son of Lieutenant-General Charles Grey, 1st Earl Grey and the Countess Elizabeth Grey. Among his siblings were Charles Grey, 2nd Earl Grey, who became Prime Minister of the United Kingdom and abolished slavery in the British Empire in 1833, Lieutenant-General Sir Henry George Grey, Governor of Cape Colony, and Edward Grey, Bishop of Hereford.

== Naval career ==
Grey joined the Royal Navy at the age of 14, serving in the West Indies and home waters from 1781. He was on HMS Resolution under Captain Lord Robert Manners in Rodney's action of the Battle of the Saintes against the French on 12 April 1782 His commission for service at the rank of 4th Lieutenant was issued in 1784.

Following representations made by Charles Grey, to John Pitt, 2nd Earl of Chatham detailing the career of his son George, also a lieutenant in the navy, and requesting consideration for promotion, he was on 7 August 1793 confirmed as Captain of HMS Vesuvius (1776). At the commencement of the war with France in 1793, Grey was serving on the 32-gun HMS Quebec, from which he was promoted to the command of the Vesuvius bomb vessel and on 3 October 1793, Sir John Jervis hoisted the flag of a Vice-Admiral of the Blue on HMS Boyne.

His flag captain was the son of the general commanding the troops, Captain George Grey, from thenceforth associated with his patron's services, and with his affection to the latest hour of his life.

The combined forces, commanded jointly by John Jervis and Grey's father, General Charles Grey, proceeded to the Caribbean where they captured the French colonies of Martinique, Guadeloupe and St Lucia. According to accounts of the time, Charles Grey ordered 2,400 troops to attack the French-held forts. His son, Captain George Grey and Captain Nugent were often employed, with 200 or 400 seamen, to move the heavy guns, ammunition and supplies to the troops, and at times to storm the enemy at the point of bayonet to gain territory.

On their return to British waters on 1 May 1795, HMS Boyne caught fire during Marine exercises while anchored off Spithead. The fire spread quickly, causing the on-board cannons to fire at nearby ships attempting to rescue the seamen on board. Eleven crewmen from the Boyne lost their lives, and two from the Queen Charlotte, anchored nearby. The anchor cables were destroyed by the fire, so the ship drifted and eventually ran aground. It eventually had to be blown up, and the Boyne Buoy, still marks the position of the wreck near Southsea Castle at the entrance to Portsmouth Harbour. The accident happened before John Jervis had been able to remove all his papers and belongings, so everything he had on board was lost. George Grey, as captain, was court-martialed but acquitted, as he had not been on board at the time.

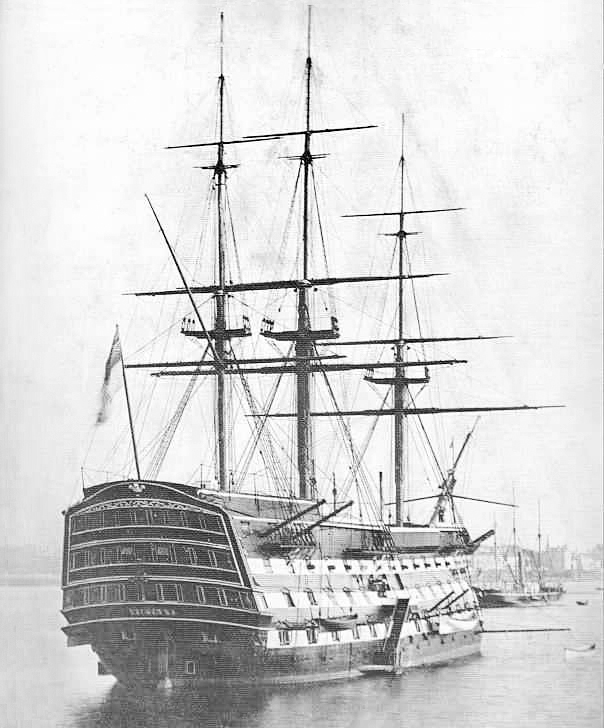
HMS Victory, which Sir George commanded from 1796 to 1797

In November 1796, Captain Grey sailed with John Jervis and Robert Calder on HMS Lively, to join the Mediterranean Fleet at Gibraltar. Admiral Jervis raised his flag on HMS Victory with the two captains, Robert Calder as Captain of the Fleet and Captain George Grey to command his flagship The Admiral hoisted his flag on HMS Victory on joining the fleet. During the Battle of Cape St Vincent of 14 February 1797, despite the heavy fighting, there was only one fatality on HMS Victory, when a Marine was shot alongside John Jervis on the poop deck.

In August 1797, Captain Grey was given the command of HMS Ville de Paris and the following year, in September 1798, he succeeded Robert Calder as Master and Commander of the Mediterranean Fleet, the orders coming from George Spencer, 2nd Earl Spencer, First Lord of the Admiralty on 29 August 1798.

By June 1799, Earl St Vincent had given Captain Grey the dormant position of Adjutant-General of Fleet and requested that he be permitted to have Grey accompany him home on the Ville de Paris. The service record of George Grey as Adjutant General of the Fleet whilst on Argo and Guerrier from June to November 1799 by Evan Nepean 26 Dec 1801

In April 1800, John Jervis was recalled to command the Channel Fleet, to quell the mutinous spirit of the crews.

Lord St Vincent was desirous of calling to his assistance in the Channel, as many as he could of the Officers formed in the Mediterranean Fleet... That the Admiralty could not, at a moment's notice, comply with these wishes as fully as his Lordship imparted them, may also be as easily supposed. Captain Grey accompanied the Admiral as his Flag Captain on HMS Ville de Paris.

At the beginning of the short peace in March 1801, he accepted the command of one of the royal yachts at Weymouth, and did not again see active service. The Grey family lived at Weymouth for the three years of his service to King George III and a doll's house that was presented to his daughters by the Royal princesses is on display at Kew Palace.

=== Admiralty Commissioner ===
From 1804 to 1806, Captain Grey was Commissioner of Sheerness Dockyard. During his time there, on 23 December 1805 his official yacht, the Chatham, was used to transfer Horatio Nelson's coffin with his flag flown at half mast, from HMS Victory to Greenwich Hospital. There his body lay in state until 8 January 1806 before being moved by state barge to Whitehall and the Admiralty for a state funeral.

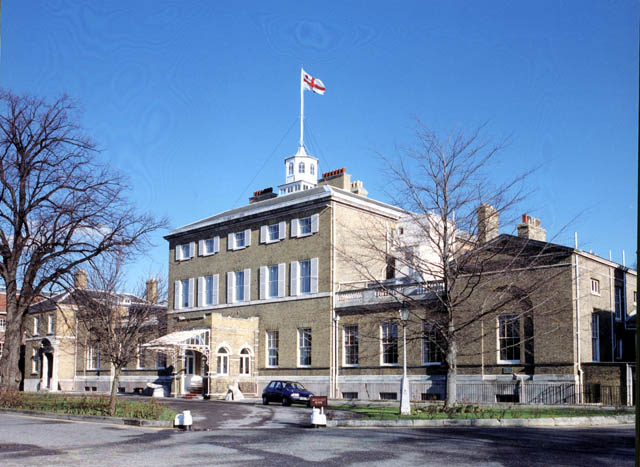
Admiralty House, Portsmouth

In 1806, George Grey was appointed Commissioner at Portsmouth Dockyard. Besides overseeing the changing face of the Navy and the Dockyard being instigated by the Lord of the Admiralty, Earl St Vincent, Sir George had an important administrative role to play. Some of his correspondence with the Navy Board from 1807 to 1827 is still kept by National Archives relating to the workers, maintenance and general operation of the dockyard, including major accidents. He also wrote to the Board on behalf of offenders who faced deportation or death for their crimes.

In 1807, the mayor of Portsmouth John Carter, together with the aldermen, Town Clerk and Coroner, arrived at the Dockyard gates to assert the right of judicial process over the whole dockyard. George Grey refused them entry until he had assurances that they were not claiming jurisdiction over the soil of the dockyard.

He became President of the Portsmouth Dock Yard Bible Association in 1817 and was an active supporter, with his wife, of Missions to Seafarers. His wife, Mary Whitbread, took an active role in looking after the dockyard workers' families, sick seamen and seafarer's orphans. She was the first woman to have been recorded as actively supporting seamen's missions by supplying scriptures and other religious reading materials to officers and instructing them to read to the men or distribute material to crews at sea. She did this for over 20 years.

In 1814 during a royal visit instigated by the Prince Regent (later King George IV), Emperor Alexander I of Russia, Catherine, Grand Duchess of Oldenburg, the Earl of Yarmouth, and Russian Ambassador Count Lieven stayed at the Commissioner's residence in Portsmouth Dockyard. On 29 July he was created a Knight Commander of the Bath.

Sir George maintained his close friendship with Admiral John Jervis until his death in 1823.

In addition to his work as Commissioner of the Dockyard he was also Marshal of the Vice-Admiralty Court at Barbados, an Alderman of Portsmouth and Vice President of the Naval and Military Bible Society.

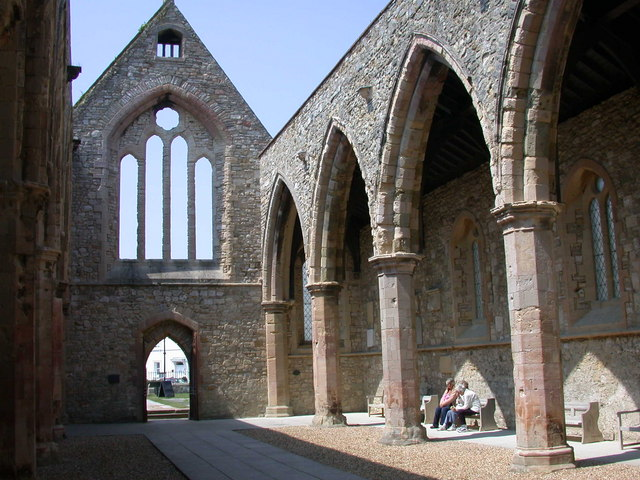
The Royal Garrison Church, where Sir George is buried

== Death and funeral ==
Sir George Grey died at the Commissioner's residence, Portsmouth Dockyard, on 3 October 1828. The Hampshire Telegraph reported his funeral on 13 October 1828:

"The remains of the Hon. Sir Geo. Grey, Bart. were this morning deposited in the Chapel of this Garrison, the Burial Service being performed by Rev. W.S. Dusauloy... The pall was borne by Admiral the Hon. Sir Robert Stopford, Vice-Admiral Sir Harry Burrard-Neale, 2nd Baronet, Rear-Admiral Gifford, Major-General Sir Colin Campbell and Captains Loring and Chetham. the principal Officers in his Majesty's Dockyard in mourning coaches, and several hundred of the shipwrights and other artificers of the yard, on foot, followed. On the Grand Parade, a passage to prevent interruption, was formed by the military and the whole was conducted in the most solemn and impressive manner..."

He was buried at the Royal Garrison Church, Portsmouth, where a memorial plaque is displayed in the chancel.

== Baronetcy ==
Sir George Grey was created 1st Baronet Grey of Fallodon on 29 July 1814, following the visit of the Allied Sovereigns to Portsmouth, and was appointed a Knight Commander of the Order of the Bath (KCB) by King George IV.

== Family ==
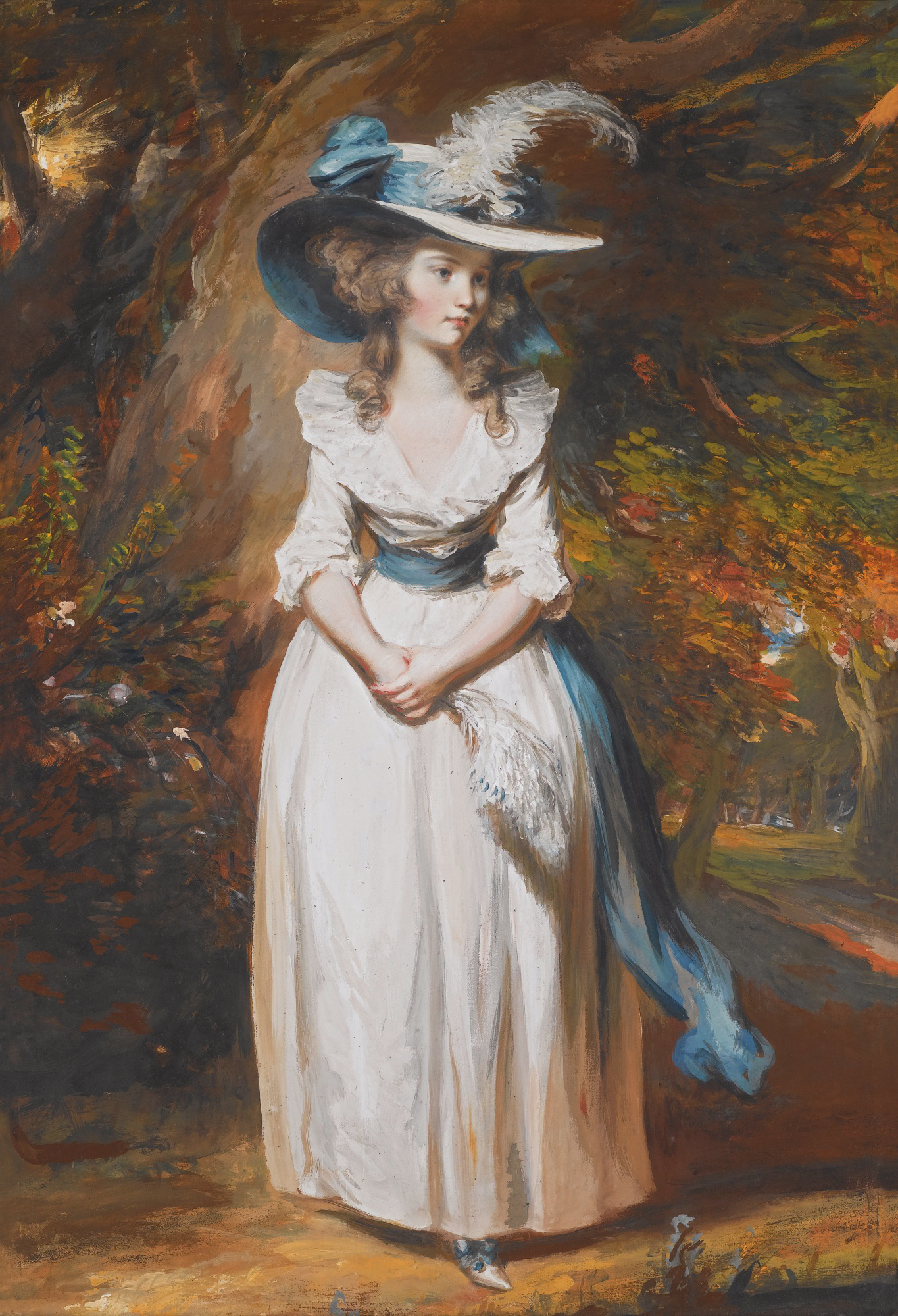
Portrait of Mary Whitbread, later Grey's wife, by Daniel Gardner, 1783

On 18 Jun 1795, George Grey married Mary Whitbread of Bedwell Park in Hertfordshire, daughter of brewer Samuel Whitbread and Lady Mary Cornwallis, and sister of Charles Cornwallis, 1st Marquess Cornwallis. Mary's brother, Samuel Whitbread, an English politician, was married to Elizabeth Grey, eldest daughter of Charles Grey, 1st Earl Grey and George Grey's sister.

George Grey and Mary Whitbread had the following children:

- Mary Grey (1796–1863) who first married Royal Navy Captain Thomas Monck Mason in 1823, with whom she had seven children, including Mary Grey. She remarried Henry Gray in 1840.
- Rt. Hon. Sir George Grey, 2nd Baronet, MP (1799–1882) born in Gibraltar and sometimes Home Secretary between the years of 1846 and 1866. He married Anna Sophia Ryder and had one son, Lt. Col. George Henry Grey (1835–1874).
- Elizabeth Grey (1800–1818) who married Charles Noel, 1st Earl of Gainsborough and died after the birth of their son, Charles George Noel, 2nd Earl of Gainsborough.
- Harriet Caroline Augusta Grey (1802–1889) who married Reverend John Simon Jenkinson and had six children.
- Hannah Jean Grey (1803–1829) married Sir Henry Thompson, 3rd Baronet of Virkees (1796–1838), and died shortly after the birth of their daughter Hannah Jane Thompson.
- Jane Baring, Baroness Northbrook (1804–1838) married Francis Baring, 1st Baron Northbrook (grandson of Sir Francis Baring, 1st Baronet, founder of Barings Bank) and had five children.
- Charlotte Grey (1805–1814).
- Charles Samuel Grey (1811–1860) married firstly Laura Mary Elton (died 1848), daughter of Sir Charles A. Elton 6th Bt, with whom he had five children and secondly Margaret Dysart Hunter, daughter of Gen. Sir Martin Hunter, in 1850 with whom he had a further five children. He held the post of Paymaster of the Civil Services in Ireland.
- A son who died in infancy 1814.

Descendants of Sir George include: Edward Grey, 1st Viscount Grey of Fallodon Thomas Baring, 1st Earl of Northbrook Francis Baring, 2nd Earl of Northbrook, the 2nd, 3rd, 4th, 5th and 6th Earls of Gainsborough, Sir Peter Curtis, 6th Baronet, Admiral Francis George Kirby and Lt. Col. Norborne Kirby.

Coat of arms of Sir George Grey, 1st Baronet
| Crest A scaling ladder in bend sinister Or hooked and pointed Sable. Escutcheon Gules a lion rampant within a bordure engrailed Argent a mullet for difference. Motto De Bon Vouloir Servir Le Roy (To Serve The King With Good Will) |

== Bibliography ==
- Tucker, Jedediah Stephens (1844). Memoirs of Admiral the Right Hon the Earl of St. Vincent. Vol. I & II vols. R. Bentley. ISBN 978-1-145-22437-7.
- Creighton, Mandell; Grey, Edward (1990) [1901]. Memoir of Sir George Grey, Bart., G.C.B. Kessinger Publishing's Legacy Reprints: Longmans, Green, and Co. ISBN 1-4326-4248-0.
- Trevelyan, G. M. (1937). Grey of Fallodon. Longmans, Green & Co. Ltd.
- Urban, Sylvanus (1828). The Gentleman's Magazine from July – December 1828. Vol. 144. J. B. Nichols & Son.
- Kverndal, Roald (1986). Seamen's Missions: their origin and growth. William Carey Library.

Baronetage of the United Kingdom
| New creation | Baronet (of Fallodon); 1814–1828 | Succeeded by George Grey |
