= William Noel (MP for Rutland) =

British politician

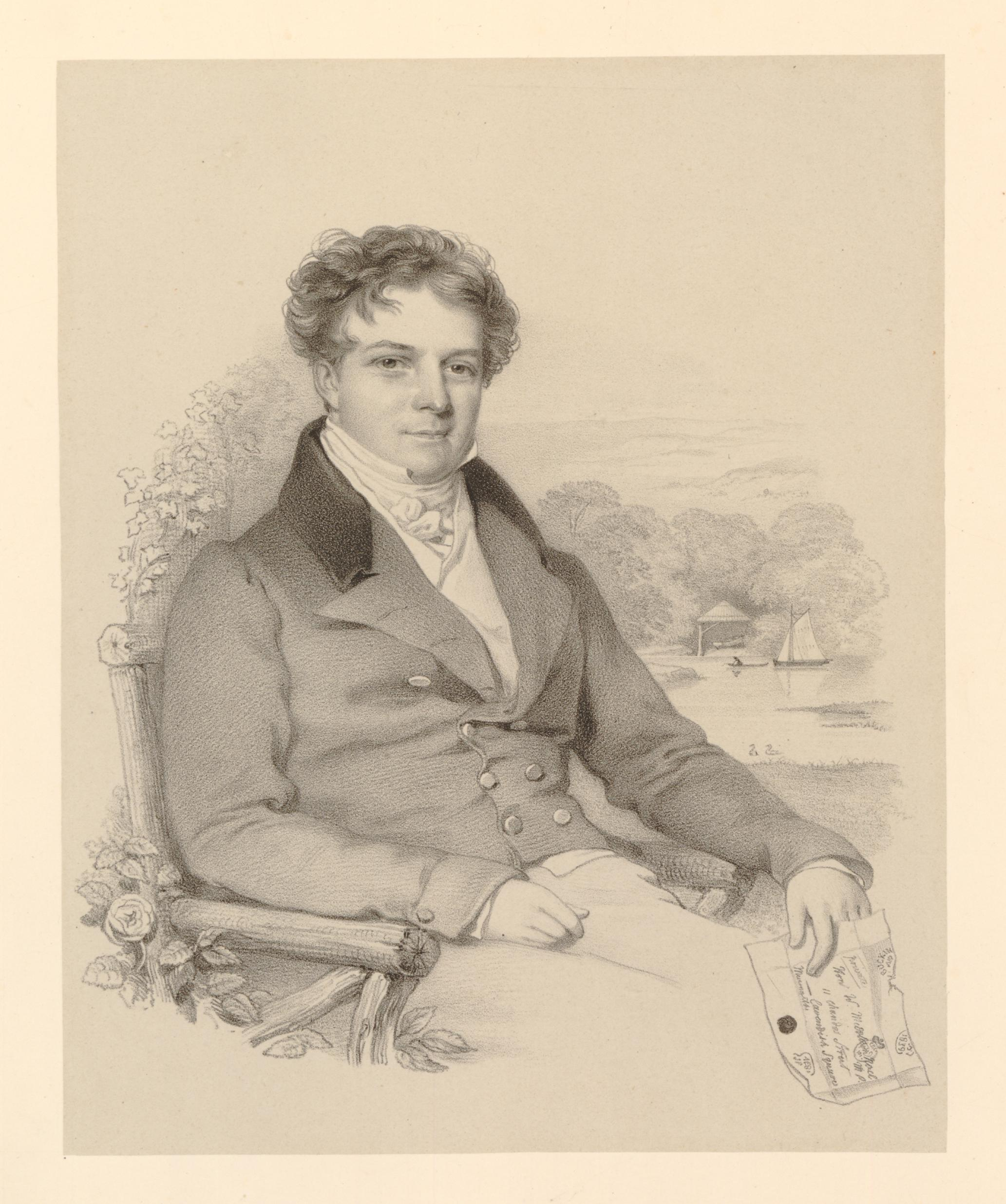
image of William Noel

The Honourable William Middleton Noel (2 May 1789 – 20 January 1859), was a British politician.

== Background ==
Noel was the third son of Sir Gerard Noel, 2nd Baronet, and Diana, Baroness Barham, daughter of Admiral Charles Middleton, 1st Baron Barham. Charles Noel, 1st Earl of Gainsborough, was his elder brother.

== Political career ==
Noel succeeded his father as Member of Parliament for Rutland in 1838, a seat he held until 1840. He served a year as High Sheriff of Rutland for 1850.

== Family ==
Noel married Anne, daughter of Joseph Yates, in 1817. They had no children. She died in October 1851. Noel survived her by eight years and died in January 1859, aged 69.

Parliament of the United Kingdom
Preceded by Sir Gilbert Heathcote, Bt; Sir Gerard Noel, Bt	Member of Parliament for Rutland; 1838–1840; With: Sir Gilbert Heathcote, Bt	Succeeded by Sir Gilbert Heathcote, Bt; Hon. Charles Noel
Honorary titles
Preceded by John Thomas Springthorpe	High Sheriff of Rutland; 1850	Succeeded by John Moore Paget
