= Gerard Noel (editor) =

English author, editor and aristocrat

Gerard Eyre Wriothesley Noel
- Gerard Noel
- Born: 20 November 1926
- Died: 27 July 2016 (aged 89)
- Education: Worth School, Georgetown Preparatory School
- Alma mater: Exeter College, Oxford
- Occupations: Editor, biographer
- Spouse: Adele Were (m. 1958)
- Children: 3, including Robert
- Parent(s): Arthur Noel, 4th Earl of Gainsborough; Alice Mary Eyre

Gerard Eyre Wriothesley Noel (20 November 1926 – 27 July 2016) was an English author, editor and aristocrat. He was the editor-in-chief of The Catholic Herald from 1982 to 1984 and wrote 20 books.

== Early life ==
The Honourable Gerard Noel was born on 20 November 1926. His father was Arthur Noel, 4th Earl of Gainsborough and his mother, Alice Mary (née Eyre), Countess of Gainsborough. His older brother Anthony succeeded to the earldom in 1927.

Noel was educated at the Worth School in West Sussex and Georgetown Preparatory School at Washington DC. He read Modern History at Exeter College, Oxford, matriculating in 1944. While he was at Oxford, he ran for the presidency of the Oxford Union but lost to Tony Benn.

== Career ==
Noel started his career as a lawyer in 1952. In the 1959 General Election he was the Liberal candidate for Argyll.

Noel served as the editor of The Catholic Herald from 1971 to 1976. He then served as its editor-in-chief from 1982 to 1984. Additionally, he was a contributing writer to Church Times, The Baptist Times and The Jewish Chronicle.

Noel was the author of 20 books. He authored biographies of politicians like Harold Wilson and Barry Goldwater as well as member of the British royal family like Princess Alice of the United Kingdom and Victoria Eugenie of Battenberg. He translated The Way to Unity After the Council by Cardinal-Deacon Augustin Bea from Italian into English. He was a Fellow of St Anne's College, Oxford and a Fellow of the Royal Society of Literature.

== Personal life and death ==
Noel married Adele Julie Patricia Were in 1958. They had two sons and a daughter: Philip Arthur Nicholas Noel (born 1959), Robert John Baptist Noel (born 1962), Clarenceux King of Arms, and Elizabeth Mary Alice Noel (born 1967).

A Roman Catholic, he enjoyed a visit with Pope Pius XII at the Papal Palace of Castel Gandolfo in 1947. He was a member of White's, Brooks's, the Beefsteak, Garrick and Athenaeum Clubs.

Noel died on 27 July 2016, aged 89.

== Works ==
- Noel, Gerard (1963). The Montini Story: A Portrait of Paul VI. London: Herder Publications. OCLC 19584980.
- Noel, Gerard (1964). Goldwater: A Pictorial Sketch. London: Campion Press. OCLC 10861060.
- Noel, Gerard (1964). Harold Wilson and the "New Britain". London: Gollancz. ISBN 9787220016738. OCLC 4469320.
- Bea, Augustin (1967). The Way to Unity After the Council. Translated by Noel, Gerard. London: Dublin G. Chapman. OCLC 956846.
- Noel, Gerard (1968). The Holy See and the War in Europe: March 1939 - August 1940. London: Herder Publications. OCLC 500253498.
- Noel, Gerard (1974). Princess Alice: Queen Victoria's Forgotten Daughter. London: Constable. ISBN 9780094598409. OCLC 1231188.
- Noel, Gerard (1976). The Great Lock-out of 1926. London: Constable. ISBN 9780094611603. OCLC 2463936.
- Noel, Gerard (1980). The Anatomy of the Catholic Church: Roman Catholicism in an Age of Revolution. Garden City, New York: Doubleday. ISBN 9780385143110. OCLC 5799760.
- Noel, Gerard (1984). Cardinal Basil Hume. London: Hamilton. ISBN 9780241112045. OCLC 12482246.
- Noel, Gerard (1984). Ena, Spain's English Queen. London: Constable. ISBN 9780094640702. OCLC 12749903.
- Noel, Gerard (2002). A Portrait of the Inner Temple. Norwich: Michael Russell. ISBN 9780859552776. OCLC 59332523.
- Noel, Gerard (2004). Sir Gerard Noel MP and the Noels of Chipping Campden and Exton. Chipping Campden: Campden and District Historical and Archaeological Society. ISBN 9780951143490. OCLC 61263052.
- Noel, Gerard (2004). Miles: A Portrait of the 17th Duke of Norfolk. Norwich: Michael Russell. ISBN 9780859552899. OCLC 57744816.
- Noel, Gerard (2006). The Renaissance Popes: Statesmen, Warriors, and the Great Borgia Myth. New York: Carrol & Graf Publishers. ISBN 9780786718412. OCLC 76163089.
- Noel, Gerard (2008). New Light On Lourdes. London: The Catholic Herald.
- Noel, Gerard (2009). Pius XII: The Hound of Hitler. New York: Continuum. ISBN 9781441180803. OCLC 686773735.
- Noel, Gerard (2011). The Journey of the English-Speaking Union. Norwich: Michael Russell. ISBN 9780859553209. OCLC 749865753.
- Noel, Gerard (2011). The Journey of the Popes: A Papal Curiosity Shop: Peaks and Troughs in Papal History. London: The Catholic Herald. OCLC 812632764.
- Noel, Gerard (2011). 100 Notable Popes: The Most Remarkable Papal Saints, Sinners, Martyrs, Heretics, Warriors and Rulers from St Peter to the Present. London: Gibson Square. ISBN 9781908096135. OCLC 751739651.
- Noel, Gerard (2012). The Heroism of Queen Victoria: And How the Monarchy Was Saved by Princess Alice. Baptist Publications. ISBN 9780957379800.
