= Anthony Noel, 5th Earl of Gainsborough =

British peer

The Earl of Gainsborough
- Viscount Campden (1926-27)
- Born: Anthony Gerard Edward Noel; 24 October 1923
- Died: 29 December 2009 (aged 86)
- Residence: Exton Hall
- Spouse: Mary Stourton (m. 1947)
- Issue: Lady Juliana Noel; Anthony Noel, 6th Earl of Gainsborough; Lady Maria Pridden; Lady Janet Noel; Lady Celestria Hales; Gerard Noel; Thomas Noel; Edward Noel
- Parents: Arthur Noel, 4th Earl of Gainsborough; Alice Mary Eyre

Anthony Gerard Edward Noel, 5th Earl of Gainsborough KStJ (24 October 1923 – 29 December 2009) was a British peer.

== Biography ==
Lord Gainsborough succeeded his father, Arthur Noel, 4th Earl of Gainsborough, in the earldom in 1927. He attended Worth Priory in Sussex. When World War II started, he was on his way to the United States so he attended the Jesuit-run Georgetown Preparatory School, then located in Washington DC. Returning to Britain in 1943 he was declared unfit for military service. When he was 30, the estate was free from debt and he moved back into Exton Hall.

== Career ==
Gainsborough worked for Vickers Supermarine in Southampton.

Gainsborough served as chairman of Oakham Rural District Council, 1952-67 before becoming vice-chairman and then chairman of Rutland County Council, 1970–73. As president of the Rural District Councils Association in 1965, he played a prominent role in opposing the Redcliffe-Maud Report's proposals for reorganising local councils which were implemented under the Local Government Act 1972.

Gainsborough was Master of the Worshipful Company of Gardeners (1967); President, British Association, Sovereign Military Order of Malta (1968–74); Knight of the Venerable Order of St John (1970); Chairman of the Hospital of St John and St Elizabeth from 1970 to 1980, and President of the Hospital from then until his death.

== Family ==
He married at the Brompton Oratory on 23 July 1947 Mary Stourton (24 September 1925 – 30 December 2018), elder daughter of Major the Hon. John Stourton MP and granddaughter of Charles Stourton, 24th Baron Mowbray, 25th Baron Segrave and 21st Baron Stourton. The Earl and Countess had eight children:

- Lady Juliana Mary Alice Noel (born 27 January 1949); married Edward Foljambe, 5th Earl of Liverpool, two sons.
- Anthony Baptist Noel, 6th Earl of Gainsborough (born 17 January 1950); married Sarah Winnington (of the Winnington baronets), one son (Henry Noel, Viscount Campden - heir apparent to the titles).
- Lady Maria Noel (born 3 February 1951); married Robert Pridden, one son and one daughter.
- Lady Janet Noel (born and died 23 January 1953).
- Lady Celestria Magdalen Mary Noel (born 27 January 1954); married Timothy Manville Hales (died 2019), one son and one daughter.
- Gerard Edward Joseph Noel (born 23 January 1955); married Charlotte Dugdale, daughter of Sir William Dugdale, 2nd Baronet. They have one son, and two daughters.
- Thomas Noel (born 9 March 1958 – 16 November 2022), FRICS.
- Edward Andrew Noel (born 22 October 1960); he married, firstly, Lavinia Jane Bingham, daughter of Commander George Edward Bingham, but divorced with no issue. He married, secondly, Sarah Kate Yeats-Brown, great-granddaughter of Montague Yeats-Brown. They have one son.

Lord Gainsborough died in 2009 and was succeeded in the earldom by his eldest son Anthony.

Peerage of the United Kingdom
Preceded by Charles William Francis Noel	Earl of Gainsborough; 1927–2009	Succeeded by Anthony Baptist Noel
