= Earl of Gainsborough =

Noble title of the United Kingdom

Earldom of Gainsborough
- Arms of Noel: Or, fretty gules a canton ermine. Crest: A Buck at gaze Argent, attired Or. Supporters: On either side a Bull Argent, armed and unguled proper, gorged with a Naval Crown Azure, therefrom a Chain reflexed over the back Gold, and pendent from the crown an Escutcheon Azure, charged with an Anchor erect, encircled by a Wreath of Laurel Or.
- Creation date: 16 August 1841
- Creation: Second
- Created by: Queen Victoria
- Peerage: Peerage of the United Kingdom
- First holder: Charles Noel, 3rd Baron Barham
- Present holder: Anthony Noel, 6th Earl of Gainsborough
- Heir apparent: Henry Noel, Viscount Campden
- Remainder to: the 1st Earl's heirs male of the body lawfully begotten
- Subsidiary titles: Viscount Campden; Baron Barham; Baron Noel; Baronet ‘of the Navy’
- Motto: Tout bien ou rien (All well or nothing)

Earl of Gainsborough is a title that has been created twice, once in the Peerage of England and once in the Peerage of the United Kingdom. The first creation ended in extinction when the sixth Earl died without heirs. However, the title was revived in 1841 for a female-line relative.

== History ==
=== 1682 creation ===
Baptist Hicks was a wealthy textile merchant in London and also represented Tavistock and Tewkesbury in the House of Commons. In 1627 he was created a baronet, of Campden in the County of Gloucester, with remainder to heirs male of his body. One year later Hicks was raised to the peerage as Baron Hicks, of Ilmington in the County of Warwick, and Viscount Campden, of Campden in the County of Gloucester, with remainder to his son-in-law Edward Noel, husband of his daughter Juliana. On Lord Campden's death the baronetcy became extinct while he was succeeded in the barony and viscountcy according to the special remainder by his son-in-law, the second Viscount. Noel had earlier represented Rutland in Parliament; in 1611 he had been being raised to a baronetcy, of Brook in the county of Rutland, and in 1617, twelve years prior to succeeding his father-in-law, he had himself been raised to the peerage as Baron Noel of Ridlington. His son, the third Viscount, also sat as a Member of Parliament for Rutland in 1640.

On his death the titles passed to his son, the fourth Viscount. He represented Rutland and Hampshire and also served as Lord Lieutenant of Hampshire and of Rutland. In 1681, one year before succeeding his father, he was created Baron Noel, of Titchfield. The following year, one month after his father's death, he was further honoured when he was made Earl of Gainsborough. Both titles were created with remainder, failing male issue of his own, to the male issue of his father. Lord Gainsborough's son, the second Earl, sat briefly as a Member of Parliament for Hampshire. On his death the line of the first Earl failed. He was succeeded according to the special remainder by his cousin, the third Earl. He was the son of Baptist Noel, the son of the third Viscount Campden from his fourth marriage and half-brother of the first Earl of Gainsborough. All titles became extinct on the death of his grandson, the sixth Earl, in 1798.

Another member of the Hicks family was Sir Michael Hicks (1543–1612), elder brother of the first Viscount Campden. He was the ancestor of the Hicks baronets of Beverston and of the Earls St Aldwyn.

=== 1841 creation ===
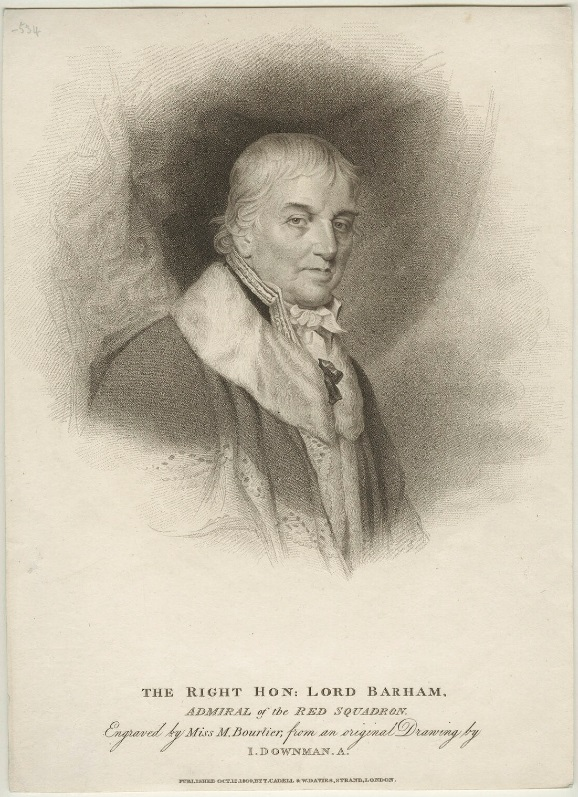
William Middleton, 1st Baron Barham

The title was revived in 1841 for Charles Noel, Baron Barham. His grandfather, Charles Middleton was an Admiral in the Royal Navy and also served as First Lord of the Admiralty. In 1781 he was created a baronet, of the Navy, with remainder to his son-in-law Gerard Edwardes (who assumed the surname of Noel by Royal licence in 1798); and in 1805 he was raised to the Peerage of the United Kingdom as Baron Barham, of Barham Court and of Teston in the County of Kent, with remainder to his daughter Diana, wife of the aforementioned Gerard Noel. Lord Barham was succeeded firstly in the baronetcy according to the special remainder by his son-in-law, the second Baronet. Noel was the son of Gerard Anne Edwardes (died 1773) and his wife Lady Jane Noel, daughter of Baptist Noel, 4th Earl of Gainsborough and sister of Henry Noel, 6th and last Earl of Gainsborough (see above). Gerard Anne Edwardes was the illegitimate son of Lord Anne Hamilton, younger son of James Hamilton, 4th Duke of Hamilton. Sir Gerard Noel sat in the House of Commons for nearly fifty years, representing Maidstone and Rutland.

Lord Barham was succeeded secondly in the barony according to the special remainder by his daughter Diana, the second Baroness. Both she and her husband were succeeded by their son, Charles Noel the third Baron and third Baronet. He represented Rutland in Parliament. In 1841 the titles held by his father's ancestors was revived when he was created Baron Noel, of Ridlington in the County of Rutland, Viscount Campden, of Campden in the County of Gloucester, and Earl of Gainsborough, in the County of Lincoln. His son, the second Earl, briefly represented Rutland in Parliament and also served as Lord Lieutenant of Rutland. The present holder of the titles is his great-great-grandson, the sixth Earl (the titles having descended from father to son).

The family seat is Exton Hall, near Exton, Rutland.

=== Other family members ===
Several other members of the Noel family have also gained distinction. William Noel, third son of the second Baronet and Lady Barham, was Member of Parliament for Rutland. Baptist Wriothesley Noel, tenth son of the second Baronet and Lady Barham, was an evangelical clergyman. His second son Ernest Noel was a politician. Gerard Noel, second son of the first Earl, was a Conservative politician. Roden Noel, son of the first Earl by his fourth marriage, was a poet. His son Conrad Noel was a clergyman and prominent Christian Socialist. Lady Victoria Noel, daughter of the first Earl by his fourth marriage, was a philanthropist.

== Titleholders ==
=== Viscounts Campden (1628) ===
- Baptist Hicks, 1st Viscount Campden (1551–1629)
- Edward Noel, 2nd Viscount Campden (died 1643)
- Baptist Noel, 3rd Viscount Campden (1612–1682)
- Edward Noel, 4th Viscount Campden (1641–1689) (created Earl of Gainsborough in 1682)

=== Earls of Gainsborough, First Creation (1682) ===
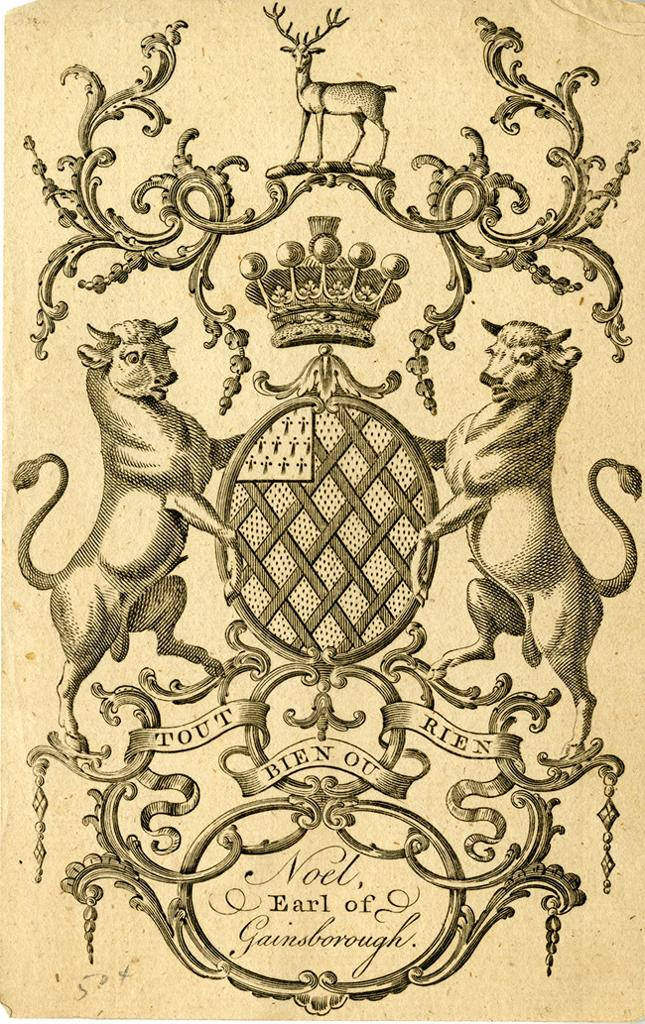
Bookplate showing the coat of arms of Noel, Earls of Gainsborough

- Edward Noel, 1st Earl of Gainsborough (1641–1689)
- Wriothesley Baptist Noel, 2nd Earl of Gainsborough (died 1690)
- Baptist Noel, 3rd Earl of Gainsborough (1684–1714)
- Baptist Noel, 4th Earl of Gainsborough (1708–1751)
- Baptist Noel, 5th Earl of Gainsborough (1740–1759)
- Henry Noel, 6th Earl of Gainsborough (1743–1798)

=== Middleton and Noel baronets, of the Navy (1781) ===
- Charles Middleton, 1st Baron Barham, 1st Baronet (1726–1813)
- Sir Gerard Noel Noel, 2nd Baronet (1759–1838)
- Charles Noel, 3rd Baron Barham. 3rd Baronet (1781–1866) (had already succeeded as Baron Barham in 1823)

=== Barons Barham (1805) ===
- Charles Middleton, 1st Baron Barham (1726–1813)
- Diana Noel, 2nd Baroness Barham (1762–1823)
- Charles Noel, 3rd Baron Barham (1781–1866) (created Earl of Gainsborough in 1841)

=== Earls of Gainsborough, second creation (1841) ===
- Charles Noel, 1st Earl of Gainsborough (1781–1866)
- Charles George Noel, 2nd Earl of Gainsborough (1818–1881)
- Charles William Francis Noel, 3rd Earl of Gainsborough (1850–1926)
- Arthur Edward Joseph Noel, 4th Earl of Gainsborough (1884–1927)
- Anthony Gerard Edward Noel, 5th Earl of Gainsborough (1923–2009)
- Anthony Baptist Noel, 6th Earl of Gainsborough (born 1950).

The heir apparent is the present holder's son Henry Robert Anthony Noel, Viscount Campden (born 1977).
The heir apparent's heir is his elder son, the Hon. Edward Patrick Anthony Noel (born 2007).

== In popular culture ==
Nora Gainesborough, a vampire, was depicted as the fictional "Countess of Gainsborough", and referred to as "Lady Gainsborough", in the HBO fantasy series True Blood (2008–2014). In the show, she is also depicted as one of the mistresses of King Charles II of England in 1665.

== See also ==
- Earl St Aldwyn

== Notes ==
=== Sources ===
- Hesilrige, Arthur G. M. (1921). Debrett's Peerage and Titles of courtesy. London: Dean & Son. p. 387.
- Gurney, J.; Olney, R. (December 1997). "Noel Family, Earls of Gainsborough". Summary report on estate and family papers 12th-20th century. Historical Manuscripts Commission. Account of the Noel family

Baronetage of Great Britain
Preceded by Quin baronets	Middleton baronets of the Navy; 23 October June 1781	Succeeded by Lovett baronets
