= Elizabeth Hay, Countess of Erroll =

British aristocrat (1801–1856)

The Right Honourable The Countess of Erroll
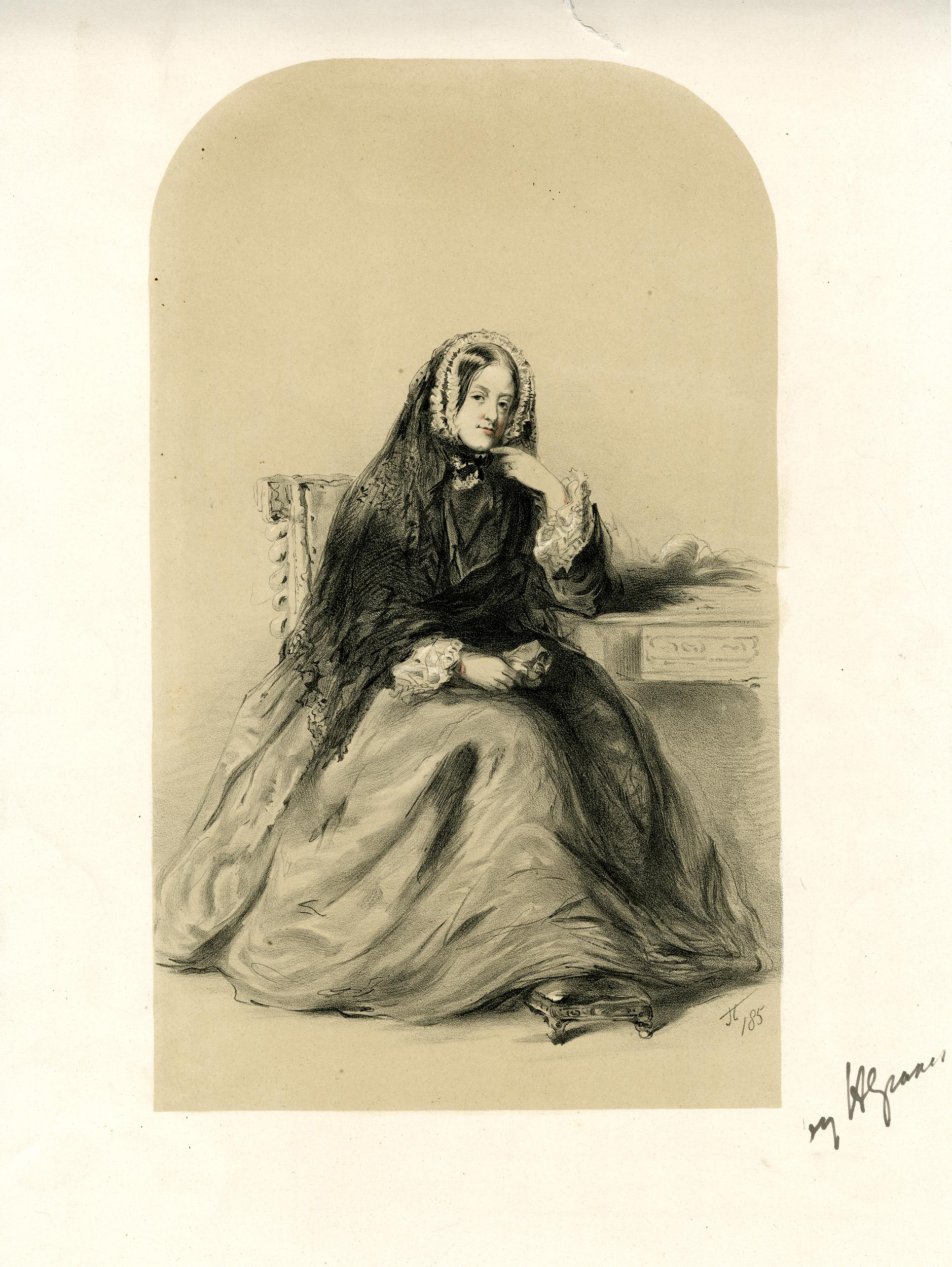
- The Countess of Erroll in 1842, by Henry Richard Graves
- Born: Elizabeth FitzClarence; 17 January 1801; Bushy House, Teddington, England
- Died: 16 January 1856 (aged 54); Edinburgh, Scotland
- Noble family: FitzClarence
- Spouse: William Hay, 18th Earl of Erroll (m. 1820; died 1846)
- Issue: Ida Noel, Countess of Gainsborough; William Hay, 19th Earl of Erroll; Agnes Duff, Countess Fife; Lady Alice Stuart
- Father: William IV
- Mother: Dorothea Jordan

Elizabeth Hay, Countess of Erroll (née FitzClarence; 17 January 1801 – 16 January 1856) was an illegitimate daughter of King William IV of the United Kingdom and Dorothea Jordan. She married William Hay, 18th Earl of Erroll, and became Countess of Erroll on 4 December 1820 at age 19. Due to Hay's parentage, William Hay became Lord Steward of the Household. Elizabeth and William Hay married at St George's, Hanover Square. Hay is pictured in a FitzClarence family portrait in House of Dun, and kept a stone thrown at her father William IV and the gloves he wore on opening his first Parliament as mementos.

In 1856, while ill herself, she was summoned from Scotland to visit her dying brother Adolphus. Her illness worsened and she died on the journey in Edinburgh, Scotland.

== Children and descendants ==
Elizabeth and William Hay together had four children.

- Lady Ida Harriet Augusta Hay (18 October 1821 – 22 October 1867), was one of Queen Victoria's bridesmaids, was the Hays' firstborn child and daughter. She married Charles Noel, 2nd Earl of Gainsborough and had five children, including Charles Noel, 3rd Earl of Gainsborough. They were also the grandparents of Edward Noel; John Baptist Lucius Noel; Sir Edward Bellingham, 5th Baronet; and Augusta Crichton-Stuart, Marchioness of Bute.
- William Hay, 19th Earl of Erroll (3 May 1823 – 3 December 1891), wed to Eliza Amelia Gore on 20 September 1848, was the second child and firstborn son.
- Lady Agnes Georgiana Elizabeth Hay (12 May 1829 – 18 December 1869), wed to James Duff, 5th Earl Fife, on 16 March 1846, was the third child and second daughter. Lady Agnes Hay's son, Alexander Duff (later 1st Duke of Fife), married Princess Louise, daughter of King Edward VII.
- Lady Alice Mary Emily Hay (7 July 1835 – 7 June 1881)

== Ancestry ==
Ancestors of Elizabeth Hay, Countess of Erroll

16. George II of Great Britain
8. Frederick, Prince of Wales
17. Margravine Caroline of Brandenburg-Ansbach
4. George III of the United Kingdom
18. Frederick II, Duke of Saxe-Gotha-Altenburg
9. Princess Augusta of Saxe-Gotha
19. Princess Magdalena Augusta of Anhalt-Zerbst
2. William IV of the United Kingdom
20. Adolphus Frederick II, Duke of Mecklenburg-Strelitz
10. Duke Charles Louis Frederick of Mecklenburg
21. Princess Christiane of Schwarzburg-Sondershausen
5. Duchess Charlotte of Mecklenburg-Strelitz
22. Ernest Frederick I, Duke of Saxe-Hildburghausen
11. Princess Elisabeth Albertine of Saxe-Hildburghausen
23. Countess Sophia Albertine of Erbach-Erbach
1. Elizabeth Hay, Countess of Erroll
24. James Bland
12. Nathaniel Bland
25. Lucy Brewster
6. Francis Bland
13. Elizabeth Heaton
3. Dorothea Bland
7. Grace Phillips

== Bibliography ==
- Walford, Edward, "Hardwicke's Annual biography" (1857) p. 209
- de Vere Beauclerk-Dewar, Peter, Roger S. Powell, "Right Royal Bastards: The Fruits of Passion" (2007) ISBN 0-9711966-8-0
