= Charles Noel, 2nd Earl of Gainsborough =

British peer and Whig politician

The Right Honourable The Earl of Gainsborough
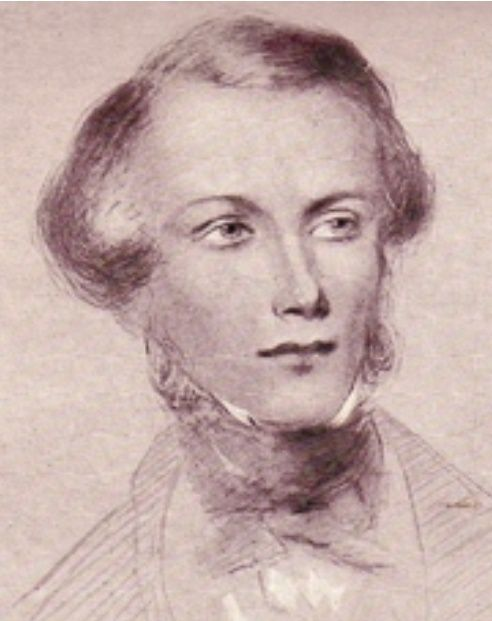
- Charles George Noel, 2nd Earl of Gainsborough

Member of Parliament for Rutland
- In office 1840–1841 Serving with Gilbert Heathcote
- Preceded by: Gilbert Heathcote; William Noel
- Succeeded by: Gilbert Heathcote; William Dawnay

Personal details
- Born: 5 September 1818
- Died: 13 August 1881 (aged 62)
- Party: Whig
- Spouse: Lady Ida Harriet Augusta Hay (m. 1841; died 1867)
- Children: 5, including Charles
- Parents: Charles Noel, 1st Earl of Gainsborough (father); Elizabeth Grey (mother)
- Relatives: Sir George Grey, 1st Baronet (maternal grandfather); William Noel (paternal uncle); Gerard Noel (half-brother); William Hay, 18th Earl of Erroll (father-in-law)
- Education: Trinity College, Cambridge
- Occupation: Aristocrat, politician

Charles George Noel, 2nd Earl of Gainsborough (5 September 1818 – 13 August 1881), styled Viscount Campden between 1841 and 1866, was a British peer and Whig politician.

== Background ==
Gainsborough was the only child of Charles Noel, 1st Earl of Gainsborough, by his second wife Elizabeth, daughter of Sir George Grey, 1st Baronet. His mother died two weeks after he was born. He was the half-brother of Gerard Noel. He was educated privately and at Trinity College, Cambridge.

== Career ==
Gainsborough succeeded his uncle William Noel as member of parliament for Rutland in 1840, but only held the seat until the following year. He then served a year as High Sheriff of Rutland for 1848. In 1866 he succeeded his father in the earldom and entered the House of Lords. The following year he was appointed Lord Lieutenant of Rutland, which he remained until his death. He was a lieutenant colonel in the Prince Albert's Own Leicestershire Yeomanry from 1879 to 1881, recorded as captain on 12 August 1850.

He and his wife embraced Roman Catholicism on New Year's Day in 1850.

== Family ==
Lord Gainsborough married Lady Ida Harriet Augusta, daughter of William Hay, 18th Earl of Erroll and Elizabeth FitzClarence, illegitimate daughter of King William IV, in 1841. The family home was at Flitteriss Park.

They had five children:

- Lady Blanche (25 March 1845 – 21 March 1881), who married Thomas Murphy
  - The "Lady Blanche House" is commemorated by New Hampshire Historical Marker No. 109 in Bartlett, New Hampshire
- Lady Constance (19 October 1847 – 8 April 1891), who married Sir Henry Bellingham, 4th Baronet
- Charles, 3rd Earl of Gainsborough (20 October 1850 – 17 April 1926), had issue
- Edward (28 April 1852 – 9 November 1917), who married Ruth Lucas
- Lady Edith (1849 - 22 August 1890), who became a nun

Lady Gainsborough died in October 1867. Lord Gainsborough remained a widower until his death in August 1881, aged 62. He was succeeded in the earldom by his eldest son, Charles.

His grandsons included Edward Noel and John Baptist Lucius Noel.

Parliament of the United Kingdom
Preceded by Sir Gilbert Heathcote, Bt; William Noel	Member of Parliament for Rutland; 1840 – 1841; With: Sir Gilbert Heathcote, Bt	Succeeded by Sir Gilbert Heathcote, Bt; William Dawnay
Honorary titles
Preceded by Richard Lucas	High Sheriff of Rutland; 1848	Succeeded by John Thomas Springthorpe
Preceded by The Marquess of Exeter	Lord Lieutenant of Rutland; 1867 – 1881	Succeeded by The Earl of Dysart
Peerage of the United Kingdom
Preceded by Charles Noel Noel	Earl of Gainsborough; 1866 – 1881	Succeeded by Charles Noel
