= William Hay, 18th Earl of Erroll =

British Earl

The Right Honourable The Earl of Erroll KT GCH PC
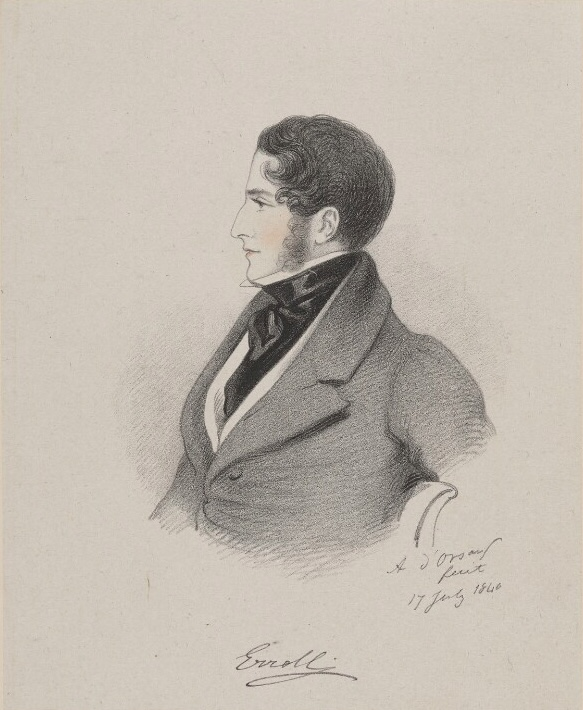
- Lithograph by Richard James Lane, c. 1840

Lord Steward of the Household
- In office 21 November 1839 – 30 August 1841
- Monarch: Victoria
- Prime Minister: The Viscount Melbourne
- Preceded by: The Duke of Argyll
- Succeeded by: The Earl of Liverpool

Personal details
- Born: 21 February 1801
- Died: 19 April 1846 (aged 45) London, England
- Party: Whig
- Spouse: Lady Elizabeth FitzClarence (m. 1820)
- Children: 5, including William Hay, 19th Earl of Erroll, Agnes Duff, Countess Fife
- Parent(s): William Hay, 17th Earl of Erroll; Alice Eliot

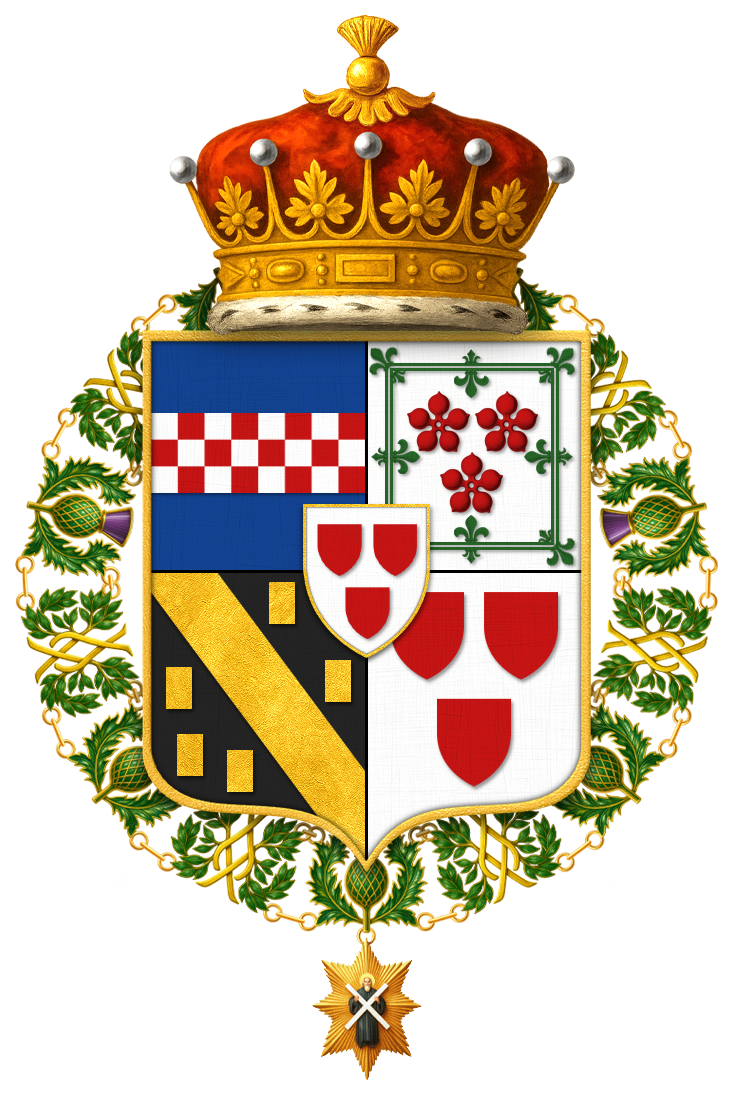
Shield of Arms of William George Hay, 18th Earl of Erroll, KT, GCH, PC

William George Hay, 18th Earl of Erroll, KT, GCH, PC (21 February 1801 – 19 April 1846), styled Lord Hay between 1815 and 1819, was a Scottish peer and politician.

== Early life ==
Erroll was the son of William Hay, 17th Earl of Erroll, and his wife Alice (née Eliot). His paternal grandfather was James Hay, 15th Earl of Erroll, son of William Boyd, 4th Earl of Kilmarnock (who was attainted with his titles forfeited in 1746). He became heir apparent to the earldom in 1815 on the death of his elder brother, Lord Hay, who was killed during the Waterloo Campaign. He was educated at Eton.

== Career ==
Erroll succeeded his father in the earldom in 1819, aged 18. In 1823 he was elected a Scottish representative peer and took his seat in the House of Lords. He was Master of the Horse to Queen Adelaide from 1830 to 1834. In 1831 he was sworn of the Privy Council and created Baron Kilmarnock, of Kilmarnock in the County of Ayr, in the Peerage of the United Kingdom, a revival of the Kilmarnock title held by his great-grandfather. When the Whigs came to power under Lord Melbourne in 1835, Erroll was appointed Master of the Buckhounds. In 1839 he was promoted to Lord Steward of the Household on the decease of the Duke of Argyll, a post he held until the administration fell in 1841.

Apart from his political career Lord Erroll was also Knight Marischal of Scotland from 1832 to 1846, and Lord-Lieutenant of Aberdeenshire from 1836 to 1846.

== Personal life ==
Lord Erroll married Lady Elizabeth FitzClarence, the illegitimate daughter of King William IV and Dorothy Jordan, on 4 December 1820. They were the parents of four children:

- Lady Ida Harriet Augusta Hay (1821–1867), who was one of the Queen Victoria's bridesmaids and who married Charles Noel, 2nd Earl of Gainsborough.
- William Harry Hay, 19th Earl of Erroll (1823–1891), married Eliza Amelia Gore, the eldest daughter of Sir Charles Stephen Gore (the third son, by his second wife, of the 2nd Earl of Arran) in 1848.
- Lady Agnes Georgiana Elizabeth Hay (1829–1869), who married James Duff, 5th Earl Fife on 16 March 1846. Their son, Alexander Duff, 1st Duke of Fife, married Princess Louise, daughter of King Edward VII.
- Lady Alice Mary Emily Hay (1835–1881), who married Charles Edward Louis Casimir Stuart (1824–1882), nephew of fraud John Sobieski Stuart.

Lord Erroll died in London in April 1846, aged 45, and was succeeded by his eldest son, William. The Countess of Erroll died in January 1856, aged 54.

== Recreation ==
Lord Erroll was the chief organiser of the Dublin Bay regatta held in Kingstown (now Dun Laoghaire) in 1828.

== Ancestry ==
Ancestors of William Hay, 18th Earl of Erroll

16. William Boyd, 3rd Earl of Kilmarnock
8. William Boyd, 4th Earl of Kilmarnock (1704–1746)
17. Eupheme Ross
4. James Hay, 15th Earl of Erroll (1772–1819)
18. James Livingston, 5th Earl of Linlithgow
9. Lady Anne Livingston (1709–1747)
19. Lady Margaret Hay of Erroll
2. William Hay, 17th Earl of Erroll
20. Sir Robert Carr
10.Sir William Carr (self-styled 8th Baronet Kerr, of Greenhead) (c. 1705–1777)
5. Isabella Carr (1742–1808)
1. William Hay, 18th Earl of Erroll
12. Samuel Eliot
6. Samuel Eliot, esq., of Antigua
3. Alicia Eliot (1778–1812)
14. William Byam
7. Alice Byam (1746–1827)
15. Anne Gunthorpe

Court offices
New office	Master of the Horse to Queen Adelaide; 1830–1834	Succeeded by The Earl of Denbigh
Preceded by The Earl of Chesterfield	Master of the Buckhounds; 1835–1839	Succeeded by The Lord Kinnaird
Preceded by The Duke of Argyll	Lord Steward; 1839–1841	Succeeded by The Earl of Liverpool
Honorary titles
Preceded by The Duke of Gordon	Lord Lieutenant of Aberdeenshire; 1836–1846	Succeeded by The Earl of Aberdeen
Peerage of Scotland
Preceded by William Harry Hay	Earl of Erroll; 1819–1846	Succeeded by William Hay
Peerage of the United Kingdom
New creation	Baron Kilmarnock; 1831–1846	Succeeded by William Hay
