= Catholic Herald =

London-based Roman Catholic periodical

- Catholic Herald magazine (4 August 2017)
- Type: Magazine
- Owner(s): GEM Global Yield LLC SCS; Sir Rocco Forte; William Cash; Brooks Newmark
- Editor: Edward Barrett-Shortt
- Founded: 1888
- Headquarters: Herald House, Lambs Passage, Bunhill Row, London, England
- Website: catholicherald.co.uk

The Catholic Herald (1 November 2013)

The Catholic Herald is a London-based Roman Catholic quarterly magazine, founded in 1888 and a sister organisation to the non-profit Catholic Herald Institute, based in New York. After 126 years as a weekly newspaper, it became a weekly magazine in 2014, changed to a monthly magazine in 2020 and a quarterly magazine in 2026. In early 2023, a 50.1% controlling stake was purchased by New York based alternative asset firm GEM LLC. It reports 565,000 online readers a month, along with 25,000 weekly registered newsletter subscribers and a print readership distributed in the US and UK, Roman Catholic parishes, wholesale outlets, the Vatican, Cardinals, Catholic influencers, and postal/digital subscribers.

With historical writers including Evelyn Waugh, Graham Greene and GK Chesterton making the Herald their spiritual home, it publishes leading Catholic writers, international news and comment from around the world, from George Weigel to Piers Paul Read. It describes itself as "a bold and influential voice in the church since 1888, standing up for traditional Catholic culture and values". In 2022, the Catholic Herald was nominated for Consumer Magazine of the Year at the PPA Independent Publisher Awards and won the PPA award for 'Writer of the Year', the first time the magazine had won a PPA Award. The Guardian have described it as having a "distinguished pedigree" and being "the nearest Roman Catholics in this country have to a proper weekly newspaper".

== History ==
The Catholic Herald was established as a weekly newspaper in 1888. It was first owned and edited by Irish Derry-born Charles Diamond, a journalist and newspaper entrepreneur, until his death in 1934. In 1920, Diamond edited the Herald from jail after writing an editorial leader article that supported Irish nationalism and allegedly encouraged assassination in Ireland.

After his death the paper was bought by Ernest Vernor Miles, a recent convert to Roman Catholicism and head of the New Catholic Herald Ltd. Miles appointed Count Michael de la Bédoyère as editor, a post he held until 1962. From 1888 to 1962, the Herald only had two editors and was based for many years in a large building on the corner of Whitefriars Street and Fleet Street opposite The Daily Telegraph building and close to its rival newspaper, The Universe. During his time as editor, he transformed it into a much respected intellectual newspaper, which often brought it into conflict with the more conservative members of the Roman Catholic Church. Circulation increased to over 100,000.

During the late 1930s, owner Vernor Miles published a number of articles, like Viscount Rothermere in the Daily Mail, which displayed some moral ambivalence towards the rise of fascism in Europe. The Herald, however, condemned Oswald Mosley's Blackshirts' street fights, anti-Semitism and worship of State power over God.

De la Bédoyère's news editor was writer Douglas Hyde, also a convert who arrived from the Communist Daily Worker. After resigning from the party in 1948, he converted to Catholicism. After his conversion, he gained an international reputation in the late 1940s and 1950s as a critic of communism.

De la Bédoyère almost went to prison for criticising what he saw as Churchill's appeasement of the "godless" Soviet Union. It was a dangerous moment for the Herald when Churchill turned his ire on the magazine. The paper's editorial on the Yalta Conference, in which De la Bédoyère strongly criticised Churchill and Roosevelt stance towards Stalin, lead to Churchill being reassured by his right hand man, Sir Desmond Morton, that De la Bédoyère was not a British traitor.

De La Bedoyere was followed as editor by Desmond Fisher. As editor of the Herald from 1962 to 1966 he covered the Second Vatican Council, after which he worked for RTÉ. He was in Rome in 1962 before the council was set up and covered the 1963 and 1964 sessions. Fisher's Vatican II coverage caused some ire in the Catholic hierarchy, not least Cardinal John Heenan of Westminster, England. Indeed, the Catholic Herald's owners, likely influenced by Heenan, recalled Fisher to London.

The Herald's independence was of great importance to Fisher. In 1962, in his first Catholic Herald editorial, Fisher wrote that a lay-owned and independent Catholic paper had "a freedom that is journalistically necessary if it is to carry out what it conceives to be its function and which relieves the hierarchy and the clergy generally of any responsibility for opinions expressed in its columns."

In the 1980s, when Peter Stanford became the editor, the publication openly supported left-wing politics in South America. Stephen Bates of The Guardian says that in the later 1990s and early 2000s under William Oddie, the publication moved to the right and published criticism of liberal bishops and Jesuits. Bates went on to say that editor Luke Coppen, installed in 2004, takes a more embracing stance towards Catholics of all political hues. During his tenure, Oddie lost a libel suit against Bates.

Many bishops in England, Ireland and Scotland, including Dublin's Archbishop John McQuaid, disagreed with the Herald's view of Vatican II events. McQuaid called it "very objectionable." Yet when Fisher resigned, many other bishop-attendees to Vatican II wrote in to say they agreed with the Herald.

Fisher had grown up in Derry in the 1920s, during The Troubles that led to partition in 1922. After graduating from University College Dublin, where he was a classicist, he moved to London in 1952 to become London editor of The Irish Press. Fisher's reporting of the Second Vatican Council was said to be so incisive that Cardinal Franz König of Vienna said he learned more from reading Mr Fisher's reports than from being there.

Desmond Albrow followed Fisher as editor during the later sessions of Vatican II. Writing in an editorial in 1968, entitled 'Publish and be Banned' (30 August 1968), following the publication of the Pope Paul VI's encyclical Humanae Vitae, Albrow voiced the views of many Catholics in Britain, and elsewhere, after the encyclical letter condemned the use of artificial contraception – a papal missive which a Herald editorial stated was "a Roman time-bomb: a theological and pastoral blockbuster".

Albrow was also the editor responsible for bringing the paper's celebrated 1960s cartoonist John Ryan into the Herald which began 'what was to become an entertaining visual chronicle of the post Vatican II Catholic church'. Ryan had attended Ampleforth and was able to speak to ordinary Catholics as he had been educated in the liturgical practice of the pre-Vatican II church in which his audience had also been raised. Ryan's cartoons gently mocked the clergy and curia of Rome and his work became an integral part of the Herald's weekly news coverage of church affairs as Ryan 'lived and breathed his subject'.

From the 1970s to the 1980s, the Herald's commercial survival was partly due to the tight budgeting of the Herald's pipe smoking managing director, Austrian Otto Herschan. He was first appointed as managing director in 1961 by Vernor Miles.

Herschan's sense of economy ensured that editorial costs were controlled through forensic accounting and a distaste for any unnecessary spending, down to questioning the cost of interval ice-creams for the theatre critic. His memoir, Holy Smoke?, revealed that his speciality as managing director was to invite Catholic grandees to write for negligible sums. Writers such as Delia Smith would be paid by being taken to lunch at the RAC Club.

Albrow was followed by aristocratic journalist Gerard Noel, author of 20 books, who had met with Pope Pius XII at the Papal Palace of Castel Gandolfo in 1947. He had two stints as editor, from 1971 to 1974, and then 1982 to 1983. Stuart Reid, later deputy editor of The Spectator, edited the paper briefly in 1975, to be succeeded by Richard Dowden.

Dowden was followed by Terence Sheehy (1983–1988). Educated by Jesuits in London and Dublin, Sheehy was appointed as a 'caretaker' editor in 1983 after working for The Irish Catholic in Dublin from 1942 to 1946. Sheehy did not step into the doctrinal and liturgical wars that were dividing the church in the 1980s as he set out a populist agenda for the paper to help its commercial interests. Employing young journalists straight from university, he steered a middle course at a time when Catholicism was starting to divide into factions as Pope John Paul II, Karol Wojtyla, clashed with more progressive elements of the church. For a traditionalist, Terry surprised readers by not censoring the voices of divorced, gay and progressive Catholics to be aired.

He reported the various scandals that emanated from the Vatican and vigorously resisted censorship from cardinals, bishops and papal nuncios for a more 'deferential' line Terry always insisted that the Herald needed to remain a strong independent voice in the church. An example was his campaign to encourage the Vatican to give their blessing to the Marian shrine at Medjugorje, in former Yugoslavia. Although when the Bishop of Mostar was opposed to the reports of the six visionaries, Terry published articles and reports from the pilgrims who had their own experiences there. In the end, the Herald influenced the Vatican to revisit their views in a more favourable way on the visions.

In 1988, when Peter Stanford became the editor, the publication openly supported left-wing politics in South America. He was editor from 1988 to 1992 and resigned, to concentrate on writing books.

Cristina Odone edited The Catholic Herald from 1992 to 1995. Odone was an Italian-American journalist, educated at Marymount School and Oxford University. She clashed with Otto Herschan, by then also chairman and Herald shareholder, who was largely liberal in his church politics. Herschan first fell out with columnist Alice Thomas Ellis, an orthodox Catholic of traditional persuasion, after she wrote a piece condemning the late Archbishop of Liverpool, the Most Rev Derek Worlock. The saga helped to end the editorship of Odone, whose resignation letter was printed on the front page of the Catholic Herald.

Odone was followed in the editor's chair in October 1996 by Deborah Jones, a former teacher, who once considered becoming a nun. Although Jones did not apply for the editor's position, chairman Otto Herschan sought her appointment as the board wanted to ensure that the newspaper's coverage was uncontroversial. Jones was a liberal Catholic, described as an 'ardent supporter of the modern church reforms introduced by the Second Vatican Council in the 1960s'.

She lasted two years before being replaced by William Oddie. Stephen Bates of The Guardian says that in the later 1990s and early 2000s under editor Oddie, the Herald moved in a different direction to the right and published criticism of liberal bishops and Jesuits. Oddie was appointed as editor in 1998 at a time when Conrad Black, also owner of The Daily Telegraph and Jerusalem Post, owned a 47% stake in the Herald whilst a similar stake was held by hotelier Sir Rocco Forte and the remaining 5% by chairman Peter Sheppard.

In 1996 Oddie had already caused controversy when he published an article, under Odone's editorship, asking: "Can Catholic loyalty to the Crown be sustained in present conditions?" He argued that the Queen had "given royal sanction to the secularisation of Christian marriage" by encouraging the Prince of Wales to divorce; also in removing the Princess of Wales's HRH designation, the Queen had "devalued motherhood". At the time of his appointment, The Tablet, speaking for the liberal Catholic establishment, published an open letter on Oddie's appointment, chiding him for "failure to understand the Catholic mind".

There were controversies under Oddie's editorship. Columnist Father David Torkington resigned in 1999, saying that the Herald was "lurching to the Right" ever since the passing of Cardinal Hume, who had been "a stabilising influence" on the newspaper.

His support for John Ward, the Archbishop of Cardiff accused of covering up the actions of two known priests implicated in sexual abuse allegations, led to his downfall. After Oddie criticised Guardian journalist Stephen Bates, claiming his account of the affair was "an unscrupulous fabrication"; the Herald was successfully sued. Oddie resigned from the editorship in 2004.

=== 2014-present: US edition, US ownership and push to digital publishing ===
Oddie was replaced by editor Luke Coppen, who was appointed in his late twenties. Coppen introduced a re-design along with a fresh editorial policy designed to 'see off the increasingly conservative competition for good'. In this Coppen succeeded, with online readership of the Herald peaking at 1.5 million global readers a month.

Under Coppen, the online version of the magazine began by only including articles from the weekly print edition of the Catholic Herald, but later he added web-only content such as the coverage of Pope Benedict XVI's April 2008 trip to the United States. The site was revamped in November 2013 and again in 2023 following new investment.

In December 2014 Coppen was tasked by the board, chaired by Peter Sheppard, with turning the Herald into a weekly magazine, with a revamped website covering breaking news. "The" was dropped from the title and the magazine started being known as Catholic Herald. A relaunch party on 11 December 2014 was attended by Cardinal Cormac Murphy-O'Connor and Princess Michael of Kent.

In 2018, Black sold his 47.5% shareholding in the Herald to Catholic Herald directors William Cash, a multi-award winning editor and author, and Brooks Newmark, a businessman, philanthropist, homelessness campaigner and founder of Angels for Ukraine charity.

A US print edition of the Catholic Herald was launched on 16 November 2018 with board members, led by Sir Rocco Forte, travelling to Washington and New York for various launch events attended by leading British and American Catholics.

The US edition was closed during the COVID-19 pandemic after churches closed and editor-in-chief Damian Thompson resigned due to differences over the U.S. edition's editorial direction. The Catholic Herald closed its Washington, D.C. offices in March 2020 as a result of US churches being closed during the pandemic. The Herald board decided to re-invent itself as a monthly magazine of global influence, taking advantage of digital subscription opportunities and focus on investment and growth in America.

When Coppen stepped down after 14 years, he was replaced by Dan Hitchens, formerly Deputy editor. Shortly after Dan Hitchens took on the position as editor in 2020, the newspaper revealed that it would be publishing on a monthly basis, a change from its previous weekly format. Hitchens stated that the change would provide the newspaper with the opportunity to expand its scope and publish more material online.

In April 2020, with the churches closing and lockdown announced in the UK, the US weekly print edition was merged into the UK print edition to create an international magazine. The Scottish Catholic Observer, Britain's oldest religious newspaper founded in 1885, is also owned by the Catholic Herald. The title was mothballed during the pandemic due to the closure of all Scottish Catholic churches. Hitchens was replaced by William Cash in January 2021.

Cash was chairman from 2018 to February 2023 and has been editor-in-chief from January 2021 to 2024. He is a two time winner of 'Editor of the year' at the PPA Independent Publisher Awards (2007 and 2008) and winning Writer of the Year in 2022 for his Catholic Herald work. In January 2023, the Daily Telegraph wrote: "The Catholic Herald is riding high after it was shortlisted for Consumer Publication of the Year at the 2022 PPA Independent Publisher Awards. Now it is expanding to find a new audience in the US, described as the "political and moral battleground of the Catholic church".

In March 2023, a 50.1% shareholding of the Catholic Herald was sold to New York based GEM LLC, an investment private equity group, with the chairmanship of the Herald passing to GEM founder Chris Brown whilst Cash remained editor-in-chief, director and shareholder. Brown is also co-chairman of French fashion magazine L'Officiel which GEM held a 65% stake and built up globally through an international licensing franchise model covering 29 countries. This international licensing model is one that GEM plans to replicate with the Catholic Herald magazine in Catholic countries around the world, as well as license content in the Herald's archive library for films, books and other digital platforms (dating back to 1934).

Under Cash's editorship, Herald website traffic increased significantly to over half a million original users a month with over 50% being from America. The magazine increased the number of special surveys, prioritized digital publishing and gradually reduced the frequency of publication from monthly to bimonthly in 2025 and finally quarterly in 2026.

== Accolades ==
The magazine was nominated for Editor of the Year (Consumer Magazine) at the 2021 PPA Independent Publisher Awards, with cover artist Adam Dant nominated for Cover of the Year, as well as for Launch of the Year for which the Herald was awarded runner up. In 2022, the Herald was nominated for Magazine of the Year and Writer of the Year and won for Writer of the Year (William Cash) at a ceremony in the City of London on 25 November. At the 2023 PPA awards, Cash was nominated for Editor of the Year (Consumer Media) and also for Writer of the Year, for articles that included a report from Ukraine at the start of the war and coverage of various pilgrimages. "To be shortlisted in a line-up that includes the publishers Hearst, Bauer Media, Condé Nast, the BBC, Future and Haymarket shows how the Herald has evolved into a world-leading media brand," Cash said. "The nominations are very much a team effort and reflect the exceptional calibre of our editorial staff."

== Editors ==
Its editors have included:

- Charles Diamond (1888–1934)
- Ernest Vernor Miles (1934)
- Michael de la Bédoyère (1934–1962)
- Desmond Fisher (1962–1966)
- Desmond Albrow (1966–1967)
- Gerard Noel (1971–1974, 1982–1983)
- Stuart Reid (1975)
- Richard Dowden (1976–1979)
- Terence Sheehy (1983–1988)
- Peter Stanford (1988–1992)
- Cristina Odone (1992–1996)
- Deborah Jones (1996–1998)
- William Oddie (1998–2004)
- Luke Coppen (2004–2020)
- Dan Hitchens (2020)
- William Cash (2021–2024)
- Serenhedd James (2024–2025)
- Edward Barrett-Shortt (2025-present)

== Contributors ==
=== Contemporary contributors ===
- Ross Douthat
- Paolo Gambi
- Robin Harris
- Peter Hitchens
- Stephen Hough
- Howard Jacobson
- Mary Kenny
- Cardinal George Pell
- Libby Purves
- Jacob Rees-Mogg
- Ronald Rolheiser
- A. N. Wilson
- Milo Yiannopoulos
- Niwa Limbu

=== Past contributors ===
- Roger Alton
- Eamonn Andrews
- Claus von Bülow
- Paul Johnson
- Lord Longford
- Malcolm Muggeridge
- Martin Newland
- Norman St John Stevas
- Auberon Waugh
- Kaikhosru Shapurji Sorabji

=== Past cartoonists ===
- Mark Haddon
- John Ryan
