= Agnew baronets of Lochnaw (1629) =

Coat of arms of the Agnew baronets of Lochnaw

The Agnew baronetcy of Lochnaw was created on 28 July 1629 for Patrick Agnew, Shire Commissioner for Wigtownshire from 1628.

== Agnew baronets of Lochnaw, Wigtownshire (1629) ==
- Sir Patrick Agnew, 1st Baronet (c. 1578–1661)
- Sir Andrew Agnew, 2nd Baronet (died 1671)
- Sir Andrew Agnew, 3rd Baronet (died 1702)
- Sir James Agnew, 4th Baronet (c. 1660–1735)
- Sir Andrew Agnew, 5th Baronet (1687–1771)
- Sir Stair Agnew, 6th Baronet (1734–1809)
- Sir Andrew Agnew, 7th Baronet (1793–1849)
- Sir Andrew Agnew, 8th Baronet (1818–1892)
- Sir Andrew Noel Agnew, 9th Baronet (1850–1928)
- Sir Fulque Melville Gerald Noel Agnew, 10th Baronet (1900–1975)
- Sir Crispin Hamlyn Agnew, 11th Baronet (born 1944)

The heir apparent to the title is the present holder's son Mark Douglas Noel Agnew (born 1991).
