= Sir Andrew Agnew, 8th Baronet =

British politician

Sir Andrew Agnew Bt DL
- Baronet Agnew in c. 1861.

Member of Parliament for Wigtownshire
- In office 1856–1868
- Preceded by: Viscount Dalrymple
- Succeeded by: Lord Garlies

Personal details
- Born: 2 January 1818 Edinburgh, Scotland
- Died: 25 March 1892 (aged 74) Dumfries and Galloway, Scotland
- Spouse: Lady Mary Arabella Louisa Noel (m. 1846; died 1883)
- Relations: Stair Agnew (brother); Sir David Carnegie, Bt (grandfather); Sir Fulque Agnew, 10th Baronet (grandson); Nevile Davidson (grandson)
- Children: 13, including Andrew
- Parent(s): Sir Andrew Agnew, 7th Baronet; Madeline Carnegie
- Education: Harrow School

Sir Andrew Agnew, 8th Baronet DL (2 January 1818 – 25 March 1892) was a Scottish politician and baronet.

== Early life ==
Agnew was born in Edinburgh, Scotland on 2 January 1818 into the Scottish Lowlands Clan Agnew. He was the oldest son of Sir Andrew Agnew, 7th Baronet and his wife Madeline Carnegie. Among his siblings was younger brother Sir Stair Agnew, the Registrar General for Scotland.

His paternal grandparents were Andrew Agnew (a son of Sir Stair Agnew of Lochnaw, 6th Baronet) and Hon. Martha de Courcy (the daughter of John de Courcy, 19th Baron Kingsale). His maternal grandparents were the former Agnes Murray Elliot (a daughter of Gov. Andrew Elliot) and Sir David Carnegie, 4th Baronet. The office of Sheriff of Wigtown was hereditary in the Agnew family for more than 400 years, until 1747, when the 5th Baronet was compensated £4,000 for the abolition of the office. The first three baronets successively sat for the same county in Parliament, with the 3rd Baronet also being a member of the Convention of the Estates of Scotland, summoned by William III in 1689.

Agnew attended Harrow School between 1831 and 1834.

== Career ==
On 17 April 1835, he was commissioned, with the rank of Ensign, in the service of the 93rd Foot, fighting in the Upper Canada Rebellion in 1838. On 18 May 1841, he was made Captain, followed shortly thereafter by Captain in the 4th Light Dragoons on 8 July 1842.

In 1843, he was appointed Deputy Lieutenant of Wigtownshire and he succeeded as the 8th Baronet Agnew, of Lochnaw in the baronetage of Nova Scotia, on 28 April 1849, which had been created in 1629 for his ancestor, Sir Patrick Agnew (a member of the Parliament of Scotland for Wigtownshire). He was later appointed Vice Lord Lieutenant of Wigtownshire in 1852. Four years later in 1856, he entered the British House of Commons and represented Wigtownshire as Member of Parliament, serving until 1868.

Agnew wrote the book The Agnews of Lochnaw: A History of the Hereditary Sheriffs of Galloway, which was published by Adam & Charles Black in 1864.

== Personal life ==
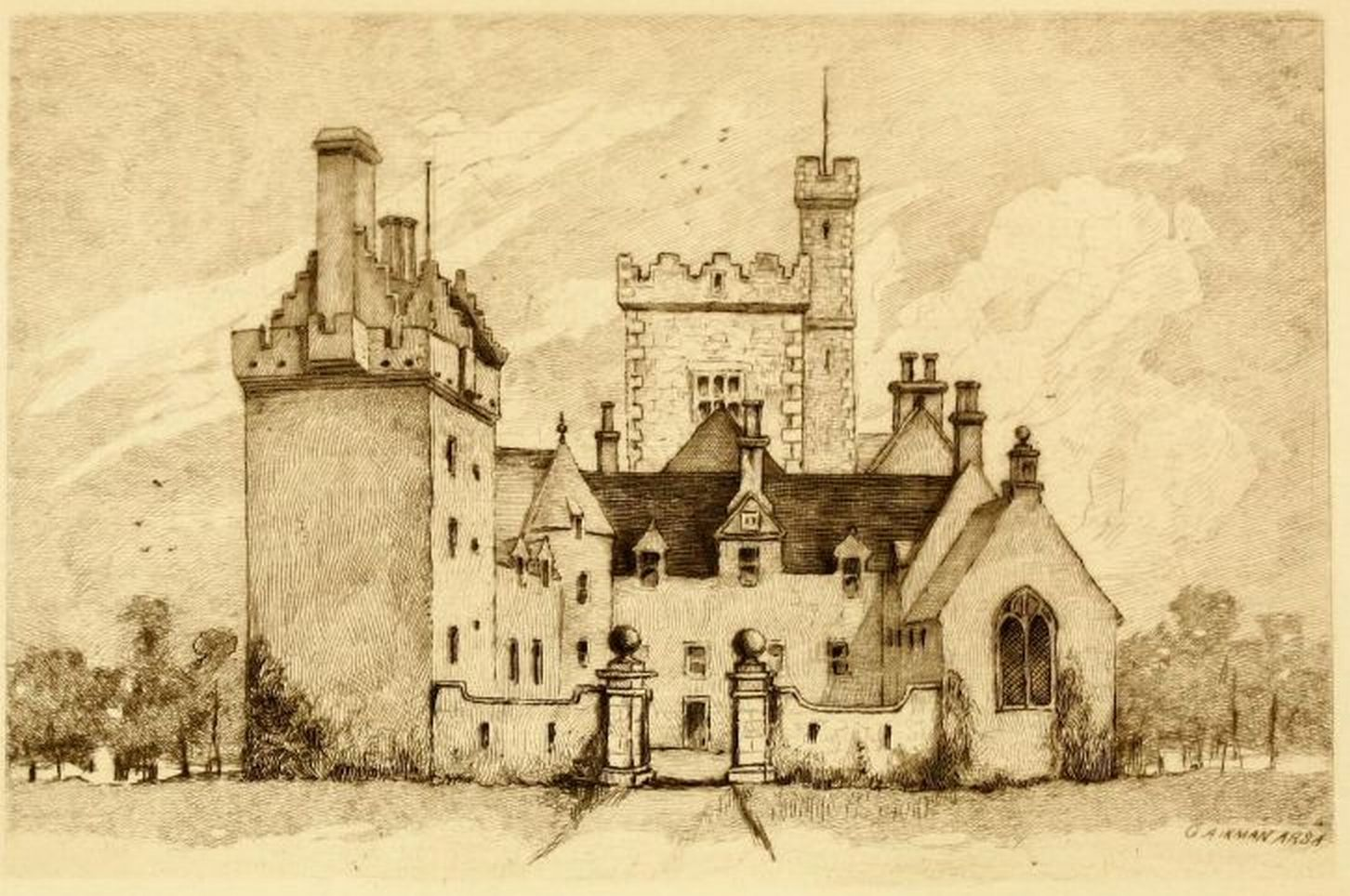
Sir Andrew's home, Lochnaw Castle, c. 1893.

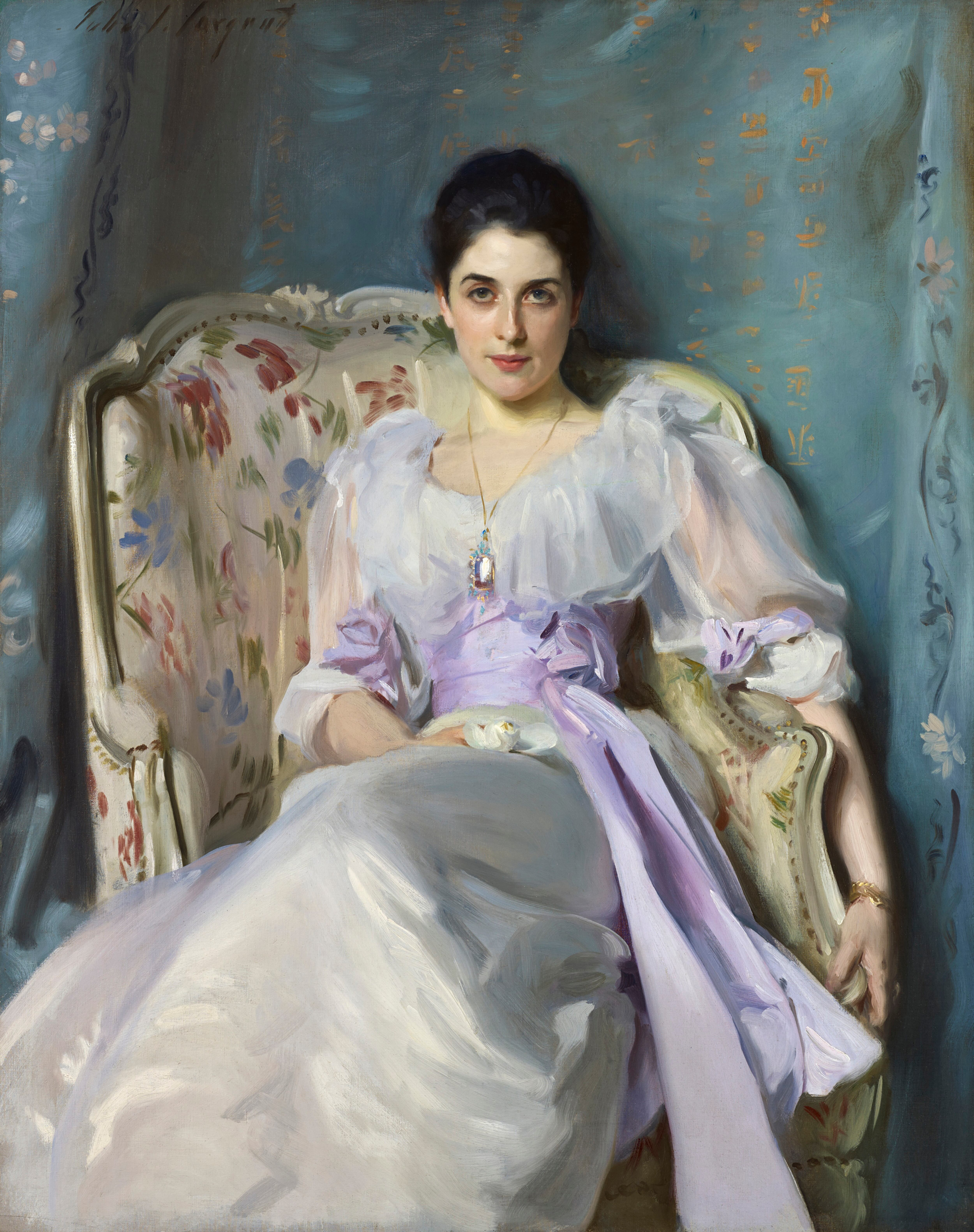
Portrait of his daughter-in-law, Lady Agnew of Lochnaw, by John Singer Sargent, 1892

On 20 August 1846, he married Lady Mary Arabella Louisa Noel (d. 1883), daughter of Charles Noel, 1st Earl of Gainsborough, and Arabella Hamlyn-Williams. From her father's second marriage to Elizabeth Grey (a second daughter of Sir George Grey, 1st Baronet), she had an elder half-brother Charles, who married Lady Ida Harriet Augusta (a daughter of William Hay, 18th Earl of Erroll and Elizabeth FitzClarence, an illegitimate daughter of King William IV) who succeeded their father as the 2nd Earl of Gainsborough. From her parents marriage, she had three siblings, Gerard Noel (who married Lady Augusta Mary Lowther, sister of Henry Lowther, 3rd Earl of Lonsdale), Henry Lewis Noel (who married their cousin Emily Elizabeth Noel), and Lady Catherine Hamilton Noel (the wife of James Carnegie, 9th Earl of Southesk). From her father's fourth marriage in 1833 to Lady Frances Jocelyn (the second daughter of Robert Jocelyn, 3rd Earl of Roden), she had two younger half-siblings: Roden Noel (a Groom of the Privy Chamber) and Lady Victoria Noel (the wife of Sir Fowell Buxton, 3rd Baronet, the Governor of South Australia). Together, Sir Andrew and Lady Mary had thirteen children, eight daughters and five sons, including:

- Madeline Diana Elizabeth Agnew (1847–1907), who married Thomas Henry Clifton, an MP for North Lancashire and the only son of John Talbot Clifton and Lady Eleanor Cecily Lowther (a daughter of Hon. Henry Lowther), in 1867. After his death, she married, secondly, Sir James Williams-Drummond, 4th Baronet, son of Sir James Williams-Drummond, 3rd Baronet, in January 1889.
- Arabella Frances Georgiana Agnew (1848–1910), who died unmarried.
- Caroline Charlotte Agnew (1848–1934), who died unmarried.
- Sir Andrew Noel Agnew, 9th Baronet (1850–1928), who married Gertrude Vernon, daughter of Hon. Gowran Charles Vernon (son of Robert Vernon, 1st Baron Lyveden), in 1889.
- Henry de Courcy Agnew (1851–1910), who married Ethel Anne Goff, daughter of Capt. Thomas William Goff, MP for County Roscommon, and Dorothea FitzClarence (a daughter of the Rev. Lord Augustus FitzClarence and granddaughter of King William IV). After his death, she married Edmund Charrington in 1911.
- Louisa Lucia Agnew (1852–1913), who married Duncan MacNeil in 1877.
- Mary Alma Victoria Agnew (1854–1923), who married Arthur Kinnaird, 11th Lord Kinnaird.
- Catherine Carnegie Agnew (c. 1855–1858), who died young.
- Charles Hamlyn Agnew (1859–1928), a Major in the 4th Hussars who married Lillian Anne Murray, daughter of Lt.-Gen. Sir James Wolfe Murray, Chief of the Imperial General Staff, in 1897. They divorced in 1908.
- Quentin Charles Graham Kinnaird Agnew (1861–1937), a Colonel in the Royal Scots Fusiliers and Military Secretary to the Governor of Gibraltar who married Evelyn Mary Alexander, daughter of Capt. John Hobhouse Inglis Alexander (aide-de-camp to Queen Victoria) and sister of Admiral Sir Edwyn Alexander-Sinclair, in 1899. After her death, he married, secondly, Cicely Anne Churchill Inskip, daughter of James Inskip and sister of the Rt. Rev. James Inskip, Bishop of Barking, in 1916.
- Gerard Dalrymple Agnew (1862–1919), a Lieutenant in The Buffs.
- Rosina Constance Agnew (1863–1920), who married the Rev. James Davidson.
- Marguerite Violet Maud Agnew (1866–1939), who married her eldest sister's brother-in-law, Lt.-Col. Sir Francis Dudley Williams-Drummond, a younger son of Sir James Williams-Drummond, 3rd Baronet, in 1890.

Lady Agnew died on 27 June 1883. Sir Andrew died on 25 March 1892 at age 74 at Lochnaw Castle near Stranraer, Dumfries and Galloway, Scotland. He was succeeded in the baronetcy by his eldest son Andrew.

=== Descendants ===
Through his son Henry, he was a grandfather of Dorothea Alma Agnew (who married Harold Swann, a son of Sir Charles Swann, 1st Baronet) and Hazel Louisa Agnew (who married Francis Stapleton-Cotton, 4th Viscount Combermere of Bhurtpore, but they divorced in 1926).

Through his son Charles, he was a grandfather of Sir Fulque Melville Gerald Noel Agnew, 10th Baronet of Lochnaw (1900–1975), who married Swanzie Erskine, daughter of Major Esmé Nourse Erskine (a cadet branch of the Earls of Buchan) in 1937.

Through his daughter Constance, he was a grandfather of The Very Reverend Nevile Davidson, who became the Moderator of the General Assembly of the Church of Scotland.

Through his youngest daughter Marguerite, he was a grandfather of Eleanor Mary Williams-Drummond (1891–1962), married Robert Barnewell Elliot; Constance Marie Katherine Williams-Drummond (1893–1968), who married her cousin's ex-husband, Francis Stapleton-Cotton, 4th Viscount Combermere of Bhurtpore (and was the mother of Michael Stapleton-Cotton, 5th Viscount Combermere); and Sir William Hugh Dudley Williams-Drummond, 6th Baronet (1901–1976), who died unmarried upon which his baronetcy became extinct.

Parliament of the United Kingdom
Preceded by Viscount Dalrymple	Member of Parliament for Wigtownshire; 1856–1868	Succeeded by Lord Garlies
Baronetage of Nova Scotia
Preceded by Andrew Agnew	Baronet (of Lochnaw); 1849 – 1892	Succeeded by Andrew Agnew
