= Andrew Agnew =

Andrew Agnew may refer to:

- Sir Andrew Agnew, 2nd Baronet (died 1671)
- Sir Andrew Agnew, 3rd Baronet (died 1702), Scottish MP for Wigtownshire 1685, 1689–1702
- Sir Andrew Agnew, 5th Baronet (1687–1771), British lieutenant-general
- Sir Andrew Agnew, 7th Baronet (1793–1849), British MP for Wigtownshire 1830–1837
- Sir Andrew Agnew, 8th Baronet (1818–1892), 7th Baronet's son and 9th Baronet's father, British MP for Wigtownshire 1856–1868
- Sir Andrew Agnew, 9th Baronet (1850–1928), 8th Baronet's son, British MP for Edinburgh South
- Andrew Agnew (actor) (born 1976), Scottish actor
- Sir Andrew Agnew (businessman) (1882–1955), Scottish oil company executive
