= Clan Agnew =

Scottish clan

- Clann Mac a' Ghnìomhaid
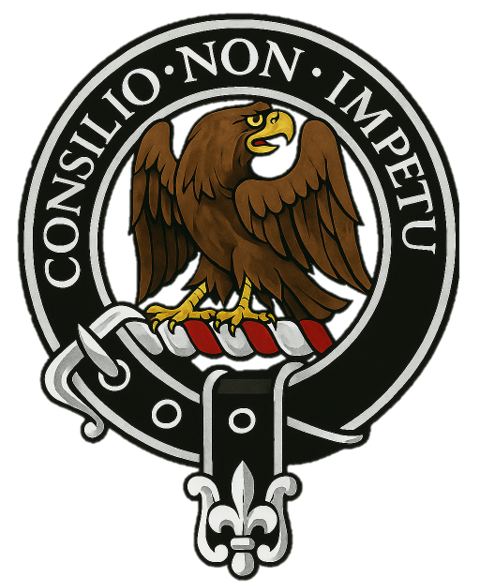
- Crest: An eagle issuant and reguardant Proper.
- Motto: CONSILIO NON IMPETU ("By Council, not by Force")
- War cry: Agnew!

Profile
- Region: Lowlands
- District: Dumfries and Galloway
- Animal: Eagle

Chief
- Sir Crispin Agnew
- 11th Baronet of Lochnaw
- Historic seat: Lochnaw Castle
Clan branches
Agnew baronets, Agnelli family (Italy)

Clan Agnew (Scottish Gaelic: Clann Mac a' Ghnìomhaid) is a Scottish clan from Galloway in the Scottish Lowlands.

== History ==
=== Origins ===
The origin of the name Agnew is disputed, although initially it was said to have been Norman, from the Agneaux or Aygnell family in the Barony d'Agneaux. It was said that the Agnews first settled in England and then moved to Ireland c. 1365 becoming the Lords of Larne before coming over to Lochnaw in the mid 14th century. The first record of the Norman name in Scotland is William des Aigneus who is witness to a charter signed in Liddesdale between Randulf de Soules and Jedburgh Abbey c. 1200.

A separate and more likely origin, on current research, has been suggested through the Celtic natives of Ulster, the O'Gnimh, who were the hereditary poets or bards of the O'Neills of Clanaboy, and who acquired the anglicized name of Agnew. This origin is supported by Sir George Mackenzie of Rosehaugh (1631/1691) lawyer and heraldic writer who wrote "Agnew - The Chief is Agnew of Lochnaw, whose predecessors came from Ireland, Rego 2do, being a son of ye Lord Agnews, alias Lord of Larne. There he gott the keeping of the King's castell of Lochnaw, and was made Heritable Constable yrof". Hector McDonnell suggests that the O'Gnimhs and the Agnews descend from Alastair (d.1299), second son of Domhnall (d. 1249), son of Raghnall (d. 1207), son of Somerled, Lord of the Isles (d. 1164). This would give the Agnews a shared origin with the Clan Donald.

=== 15th and 16th centuries ===
Andrew Agnew of Lochnaw was granted the lands and constableship of Lochnaw Castle by Charter dated 10 November 1426 from William Douglas of Leswalt. In 1451 he was appointed Sheriff of Wigtown, an honour still held by his direct descendants.

Patrick Agnew 4th of Lochnaw died shortly after the Battle of Flodden, possibly from wounds. Andrew Agnew 5th of Lochnaw was killed at the Battle of Pinkie in 1547, fighting against the English.

=== 17th century ===
Sir Patrick Agnew was MP for Wigtownshire from 1628 to 1633, and again from 1643 to 1647. On 28 July 1629 he was made a baronet of Nova Scotia. Agnew married Lady Anne Stewart, daughter of the first Earl of Galloway. When he died in 1661, he was succeeded by his eldest son, Andrew, who would also be returned as MP for Wigtownshire. He had been created Sheriff of both Kirkcudbright and Wigtown in the 1650s, while Scotland was part of the Protectorate with England.

=== 18th century ===
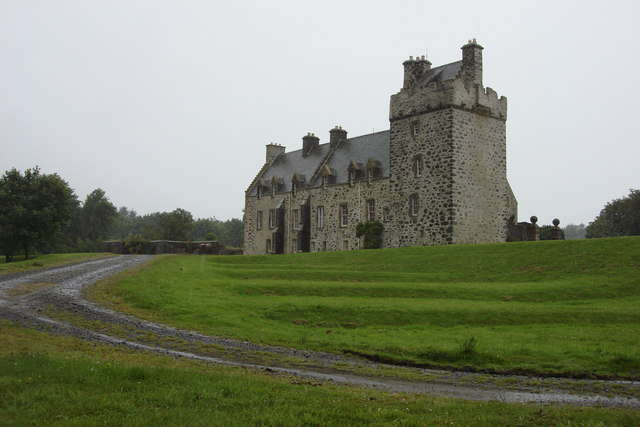
Lochnaw Castle in 2007

Sir Andrew Agnew of Lochnaw 5th Bt married a kinswoman, Eleanor Agnew of Lochryan, with whom he had twenty one children. He was a distinguished soldier commanding the 21st Foot (which later became the Royal Scots Fusiliers) against the French at the Battle of Dettingen in 1743. King George II of Great Britain, the last British monarch to lead troops in battle, remarked to Agnew that French cavalry had been let among his regiment. Sir Andrew replied, "Yes, please your Majesty, but they didna win back again". He became a Lieutenant General and Governor of Tynemouth Castle.

During the Jacobite rising of 1745 the Clan Agnew continued their support of the British Government. Sir Andrew held Blair Castle, seat of the Duke of Atholl, against Jacobite forces. Agnew's forces were near starvation when Charles Edward Stuart called the Jacobite forces to retreat to Inverness to meet the advance of Prince William Augustus, Duke of Cumberland. See main article: Siege of Blair Castle.

=== 19th Century ===
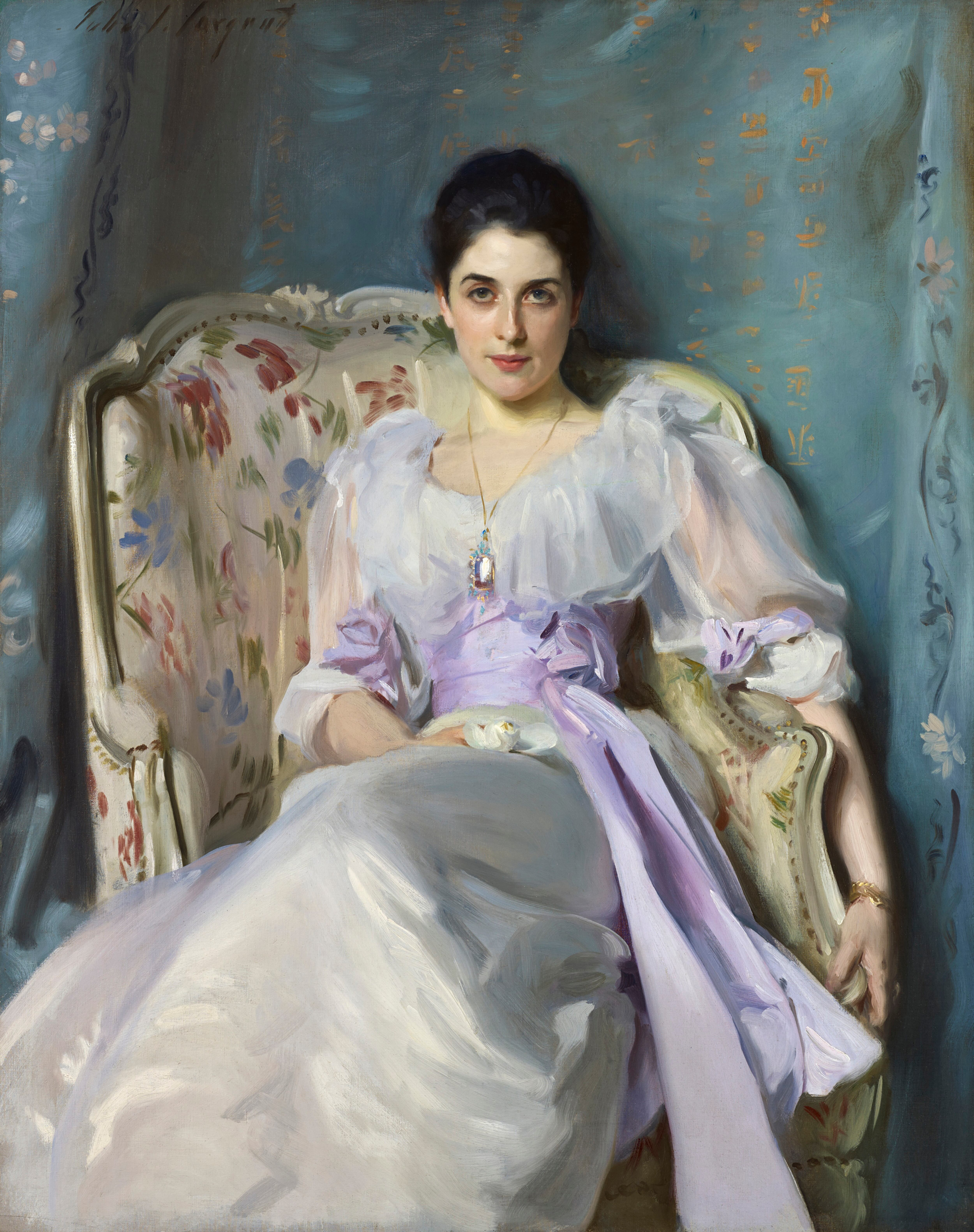
John Singer Sargent's 1892 portrait of Gertrude Agnew, Lady Agnew of Lochnaw

Sir Andrew Agnew, 7th Baronet (1793–1849) who married Madeline, daughter of Sir David Carnegie of Pitarrow Bt (later the Earl of Southesk) was an MP for Wigtownshire 1830-37 and a strong promoter of the Sabbath Observance Bills. Sir Andrew Agnew, 8th Baronet married Lady Louisa Noel, daughter of the 1st Earl of Gainsborough. He served in the 93rd Highlanders in Canada and was MP for Wigtownshire.

=== Principal branches ===
The principal branches of the Clan Agnew include:

- the Agnews of Croach or Lochryan, descending from William 2nd son of Andrew Agnew 2nd of Lochnaw (now the Wallaces of Lochryan)
- the Agnews of Sheuchan descended from Patrick 3rd son of Sir Patrick Agnew of Lochnaw 1st Bt, whose eventual heiress Margaret married John Vaus of Barnbarroch who under a 1757 entail assumed the name Vans-Agnew (now Vans of Barnbarroch)
- the Agnews of Kilwaughter, near Larne in Northern Ireland. The precise connection is not known, but the evidence points to the early Agnews of Kilwaughter being kin to the Agnews of Lochnaw
- The Agnews of Dalreagle descend from Alexander Agnew a natural son of Sir Andrew Agnew of Lochnaw 3rd Bt, whose great-grandson was Major General Patrick Alexander Agnew 4th of Dalreagle of the Honorable East India Company.

== Tartan ==
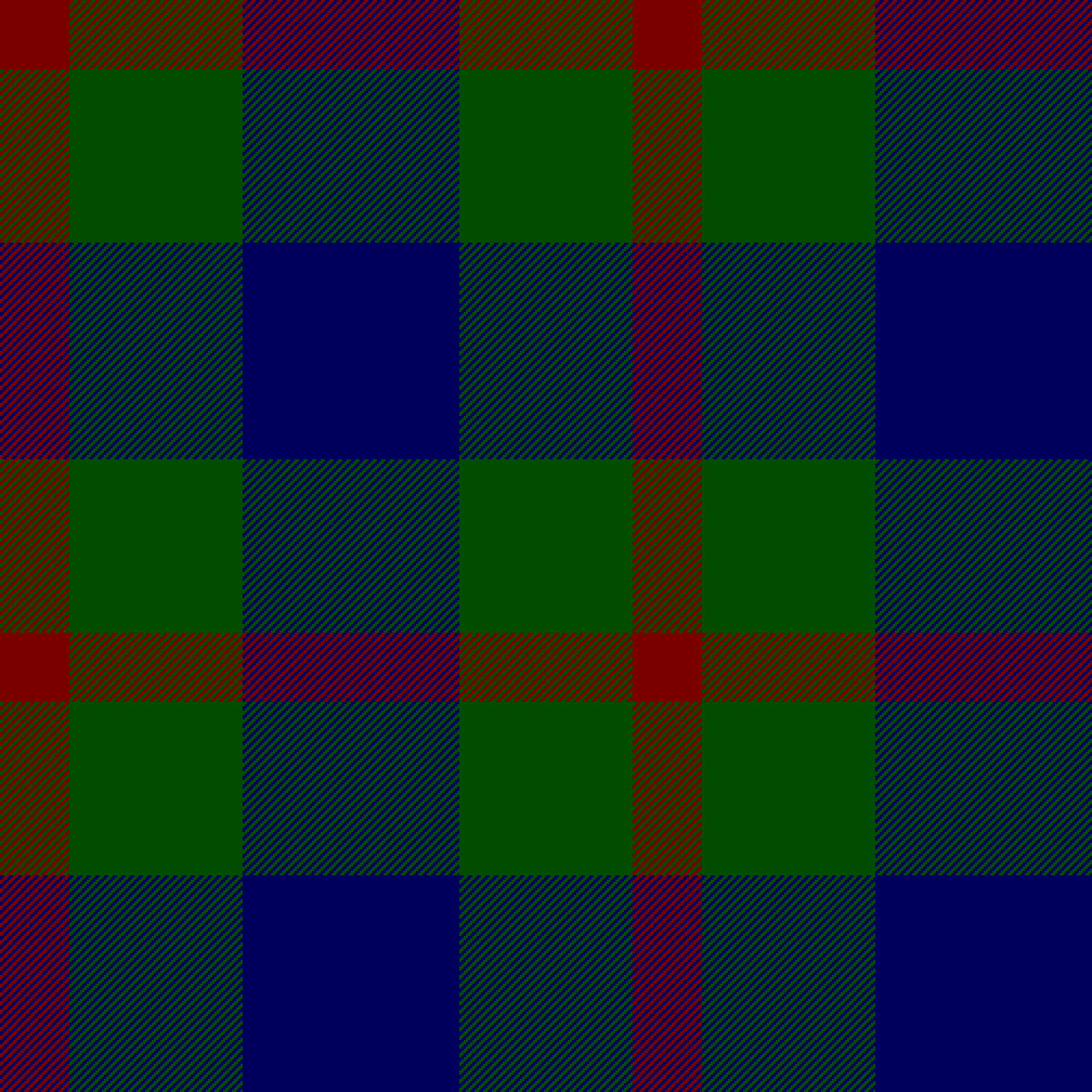
Agnew Tartan

the Scottish Register of Tartans list one tartan for Agnew, created in 1976 and also registered with the Lord Lyon in 1978.

== Clan Chief ==
- Clan chief: Sir Crispin Agnew of Lochnaw, 11th Baronet (Agnew baronets), King's Counsel and Rothesay Herald, whose heir is Mark Agnew of Lochnaw yr. The genealogy of the chiefly family can be found at the Red Book of Scotland.

== Castles ==
- Lochnaw Castle was the seat of the chief of Clan Agnew until it was sold in 1948. It is now in private ownership, but well known for its fishing
- Galdenoch Castle, built between 1547 and 1570 still a ruin and part of Galdenoch Farm was the home of the Agnews of Galdenoch who descended from Gilbert 2nd son of Sir Andrew Agnew 5th of Lochnaw who was in possession of Galdenoch in 1574.

== See also ==
- Agnew (surname)
