= Agnew =

Agnew may refer to:

== People ==
- Agnew (surname)
- Agnew baronets, a title in Scotland and England
- Clan Agnew, a Scottish lowland clan

== Places ==
=== Australia ===
- Agnew, Western Australia
- Agnew Gold Mine, a gold mine in Western Australia

=== United States ===
- Agnew, Michigan
- Agnew, Nebraska
- Agnew, Washington
- Agnew, West Virginia
- Agnew's Village, California
  - Agnew Depot

== Other uses ==
- Agnew, a type of black box (telephone hacking device)

== See also ==
- Agnews Developmental Center
- Thomas Agnew & Sons, a fine arts dealer in London
