= John Agnew =

John Agnew may refer to:

- John Agnew (Prince Edward Island politician) (1854–1928), Canadian merchant and politician from Prince Edward Island
- John Agnew (New Brunswick politician) (c. 1727–1812), loyalist minister and politician in New Brunswick
- John Agnew (footballer) (1935–2002), English footballer
- John Hume Agnew (1863–1908), Canadian provincial treasurer for Manitoba
- John A. Agnew (born 1949), British-American political geographer
- John Stuart Agnew (born 1949), British MEP
- Sir John Stuart Agnew, 3rd Baronet (1879–1957), one of Agnew baronets
- Sir John Anthony Stuart Agnew, 4th Baronet (1914–1993), one of Agnew baronets
- Sir John Agnew, 6th Baronet (1950–2011), one of Agnew baronets
- John Alexander Agnew (1872–1939), New Zealand mining engineer and philatelist
- John Holmes Agnew (1804–1865), professor of ancient languages and Presbyterian clergyman
