= James Agnew (disambiguation) =

James Agnew (1815–1901) was Premier of Tasmania.

James Agnew may also refer to:

- James Agnew (British Army officer) (1719–1777)
- Sir James Agnew, 4th Baronet (c. 1660–1735)
- James E. Agnew (1891–1956), American politician in Boston, Massachusetts
- Jim Agnew (born 1966), ice hockey player

== See also ==
- Agnew (disambiguation)
