= Agnew (surname) =

Agnew is a surname of Norman, Scottish, English, and Irish origin. There are three etymologies:
1) deriving from the place name Agneaux in Normandy,
2) deriving from the Anglo-Norman word aignel or aignau ("lamb"),
3) or, in the case of Irish, deriving from Ó Gnímh ("descendant of Gníomh").

As of 1881, there were 1651 bearers of the surname in Great Britain, most of whom were located in southwest Scotland and northwest England. In the period 1847–1864, most bearers of the surname in Ireland were located in Ulster, particularly in County Antrim.

Notable people with the surname include:

- Alex Agnew (born 1973), Belgian comedian
- Alfie Agnew (born 1969), American mathematician, musician, singer, and songwriter
- Andrew Agnew (born 1976), Scottish actor
- Billy Agnew (1898–?), Scottish soccer player
- Chloë Agnew (born 1989), Irish singer
- Crispin Agnew (born 1944), Scottish advocate, explorer, and herald
- David Agnew (footballer) (1925–1966), Northern Irish soccer player
- David Agnew (Maryland politician) (1822–1888), American politician
- David Hayes Agnew (1818–1892), American surgeon
- Frank Agnew (born 1964), American musician
- Fraser Agnew, Northern Irish politician
- Gary Agnew (born 1960), Canadian hockey coach
- Geoffrey Agnew (1908–1986), English art dealer
- George Agnew (Australian politician) (1853–1934), English-born Australian politician
- George B. Agnew (1868–1941), American politician
- Harold Agnew (1921–2013), American physicist
- Jamal Agnew (born 1995), American football player
- James Agnew (1815–1901), Australian politician
- James Agnew (British Army officer) (1719–1777), killed in the American Revolution
- Jaylyn Agnew (born 1997), American basketball player
- Jeff Agnew (born 1965), American stock car racing driver
- Jim Agnew (born 1966), American hockey player
- John Agnew (Prince Edward Island politician) (1853–1928), Scottish-born Canadian merchant and politician
- John A. Agnew (born 1949), British–American political geographer
- John Hume Agnew (1863–1908), Canadian politician
- Jonathan Agnew (born 1960), English cricket broadcaster and former cricketer
- Judy Agnew (1921–2012), Second Lady of the United States, wife of Spiro
- Lee Agnew (born 1971), Scottish drummer and percussionist
- Liam Agnew (born 1995), English soccer player
- Lindsay Agnew (born 1995), Canadian soccer player
- Paddy Agnew (Irish republican) (born 1955), Irish politician
- Paddy Agnew (Stormont MP) (1878 – fl. 1958), Irish politician
- Paul Agnew (born 1964), Scottish operatic tenor and conductor
- Paul Agnew (footballer) (born 1965), Northern Irish soccer player and coach
- Pete Agnew (born 1947), Scottish bassist
- Sir Peter Agnew, 1st Baronet (1900–1990), English Royal Navy officer and politician
- Ralph Palmer Agnew (1900–1986), American mathematician
- Ray Agnew (born 1967), American football player
- Ray Agnew III (born 1991), American football player
- Rikk Agnew (born 1958), American guitarist
- Robert Agnew (1899–1983), American actor
- Robert Agnew (criminologist) (born 1953), American professor
- Roy Agnew (1891–1944), Australian composer and pianist
- Sam Agnew (1887–1951), American baseball player
- Scott Agnew (born 1987), Scottish soccer player and coach
- Spiro Agnew (1918–1996), American politician and 39th vice president of the United States, husband of Judy
- Steve Agnew (born 1965), English soccer player and coach
- Steven Agnew (born 1979), Northern Irish politician
- Stuart Agnew (born 1949), English politician
- Todd Agnew (born 1971), American musician, singer, and songwriter
- Troy Agnew (1890–1971), American baseball player and manager
- Valerie Agnew (born 1969), American drummer
- Vince Agnew (born 1987), American football player
- William Agnew (footballer) (1879–1936), Scottish soccer player
- William Agnew (Royal Navy officer) (1898–1960), English Royal Navy officer

== See also ==
- Agnew Gold Mine
- Clan Agnew
