= Francis Stapleton-Cotton, 4th Viscount Combermere =

The Right Honourable The Viscount Combermere DL

Deputy Lieutenant of Herefordshire
- In office 1953–1960

Personal details
- Born: Francis Lynch Wellington Stapleton-Cotton; 29 June 1887
- Died: 8 February 1969 (aged 81)
- Spouse(s): Hazel Louisa Agnew (m. 1913; div. 1926) Constance Marie Katherine Drummond (m. 1927; died 1968)
- Children: Michael Stapleton-Cotton, 5th Viscount Combermere; Hon. David Stapleton-Cotton
- Parent(s): Robert Stapleton-Cotton, 3rd Viscount Combermere; Isabel Marian Chetwynd
- Education: Harrow School

Francis Lynch Wellington Stapleton-Cotton, 4th Viscount Combermere DL (29 June 1887 – 8 February 1969)

== Early life ==
He was born on 29 June 1887. He was the only son of Robert Stapleton-Cotton, 3rd Viscount Combermere and the former Isabel Marian (née Chetwynd) Poole, the former wife of Cudworth Halsted Poole of Marbury Hall (the High Sheriff of Cheshire).

His paternal grandparents were Col. Wellington Stapleton-Cotton, 2nd Viscount Combermere and Susan Alice Sitwell (a daughter of Sir George Sitwell, 2nd Baronet). His maternal grandparents were Sir George Chetwynd, 3rd Baronet and Lady Charlotte Augusta Hill (a daughter of Arthur Hill, 3rd Marquess of Downshire and Lady Maria Windsor, a daughter of the 5th Earl of Plymouth).

He was educated at Harrow School in London.

== Career ==
Upon his father's death on 20 February 1898, ten-year old Francis succeeded as the 9th Baronet Cotton of Combermere (created for his ancestor Sir Robert Cotton in the Baronetage of England in 1677) as well as the 4th Baron Combermere of Combermere (created for Stapleton Cotton in the Peerage of the United Kingdom in 1814 due to his services in the Battle of the Pyrenees, the Battle of Orthez and the Battle of Toulouse during the Peninsular War) and the 4th Viscount Combermere of Bhurtpore (also created for Stapleton Cotton in the Peerage of the United Kingdom in 1827 for his success as Commander-in-Chief, India).

In 1916, Combermere gained the rank of Lieutenant in the Royal Garrison Artillery (Special Reserve) and fought in World War I between 1916 and 1919, where he was wounded. He held the office of Deputy Lieutenant of Herefordshire between 1953 and 1960.

== Personal life ==
On 30 October 1913, Lord Combermere married Hazel Louisa Agnew (d. 1943), the second daughter of Henry de Courcy Agnew (second son of Sir Andrew Agnew, 8th Baronet, by his wife Lady Louisa Noel, a daughter of Charles Noel, 1st Earl of Gainsborough) and the former Ethel Anne Goff (a daughter of Capt. Thomas William Goff, MP for County Roscommon and the former Dorothea FitzClarence, a daughter of the Rev. Lord Augustus FitzClarence, an illegitimate son of King William IV). They divorced in 1926, and she later died on 15 April 1943.

On 1 January 1927, Combermere remarried to his first wife's cousin, Constance Marie Katherine Drummond (d. 1968), the youngest daughter of Lt.-Col. Sir Francis Dudley Williams-Drummond (a younger son of Sir James Williams-Drummond, 3rd Baronet and Marguerite Violet Maude Agnew (the youngest daughter of Sir Andrew Agnew, 8th Baronet of Lochnaw). Together, they were the parents of two sons:

- Michael Wellington Stapleton-Cotton, 5th Viscount Combermere (1929–2000), who married Pamela Coulson, a daughter of Rev. Robert Gustavus Coulson.
- Capt. Hon. David Peter Dudley Stapleton-Cotton (6 March 1932 - 24 October 2021), married Susan Nomakepu Albu, second daughter of Sir George Albu, 2nd Baronet, in 1955.

Lady Combermere died on 29 June 1968. Lord Combermere died less than a year later on 8 February 1969. He was succeeded in his titles by his eldest son Michael.

Peerage of the United Kingdom
Preceded by Robert Wellington Stapleton-Cotton	Viscount Combermere; 1898–1969	Succeeded by Michael Wellington Stapleton-Cotton
