= Egnew =

Egnew is a surname. Notable people with the surname include:

- Danielle Egnew (born 1969), American musician and actress
- Michael Egnew (born 1989), American football player

== See also ==
- Agnew (surname)
