= David Agnew =

David Agnew may refer to:

- David Agnew (pen name), a pen name employed on BBC television drama programmes as a scriptwriting credit
- David Agnew (president) (born 1957), president of Seneca Polytechnic, Toronto, Ontario, Canada
- David Hayes Agnew (1818–1892), American surgeon, anatomist, and educator
- David Agnew (footballer) (1925–1966), Northern Irish footballer
- David Agnew (Maryland politician) (1822–1888), American politician from Maryland
