= Gordon Dalyell of the Binns =

Percy Gordon Dalyell of the Binns CIE DL (died 15 September 1953) was a British soldier, colonial administrator and officer of arms.

Dalyell was born as Percy Gordon Loch, the son of Lt Col William Loch. On 9 August 1905 he commissioned from the Royal Military College, Sandhurst into the British Indian Army. He was a member of the Loch family. While in India he worked in the Indian Political Department and was appointed a Companion of the Order of the Indian Empire. Between 1939 and his death in 1953 he was Unicorn Pursuivant in the Court of the Lord Lyon. He was admitted to the Royal Company of Archers and held the office of Deputy Lieutenant of West Lothian from 1938.

On 12 September 1928 he married Eleanor Dalyell, daughter of Sir James Wilkie-Dalyell of the Binns, 9th Baronet, and assumed the surname of Dalyell by decree of Lord Lyon King of Arms. They had a son, later to become an MP Tam Dalyell, who was born 9 August 1932.

Heraldic offices
Preceded by Harold Andrew Balvaird Lawson	Unicorn Pursuivant; 1939-1953	Succeeded by Sir Iain Moncreiffe, Bt
