= The Eclectic Magazine of Foreign Literature, Science, and Art =

The Eclectic Magazine of Foreign Literature, Science, and Art was a monthly periodical published between 1844 and 1907. It reprinted the best of British magazines, as well as extracts from new books and, in its later years, original articles and fiction.

== History ==
The magazine was created in 1844 when New York publishers Leavitt, Trow and Company purchased the Eclectic Museum from Eliakim Littell and renamed it The Eclectic Magazine of Foreign Literature, Science and Art. Leavitt, Trow, & Co published the magazine in New York from 1844 to 1898. It was sold in 1898 to its weekly Boston-based rival, Littell's Living Age, who kept it in publication until 1905. It returned to New York in 1905 but was discontinued in 1907.

Its first editor was John Holmes Agnew, a professor of ancient languages and member of the Presbyterian clergy. Agnew was soon replaced by Walter Bidwell, who held the editorship from 1846 until his death in 1881.
