= Sir John MacLeod, 2nd Baronet =

Sir John Mackintosh Norman MacLeod, 2nd Baronet (10 August 1891 – 23 September 1939) was a Scottish officer of arms.

MacLeod was the eldest son of Sir John MacLeod, 1st Baronet and Edith Fielden, and on 6 March 1934 he succeeded to his father's title.

He was an officer in the Royal Naval Volunteer Reserve during the First World War. Between 1925 and 1929 MacLeod was Unicorn Pursuivant of the Court of the Lord Lyon, and was Rothesay Herald from 1929 until his death in 1939.

He married Isa Brusati on 29 August 1918. MacLeod was succeeded in his title by his son, Ian.

Baronetage of the United Kingdom
| Preceded by John MacLeod | Baronet (of Fuinary); 1934–1939 | Succeeded by Ian MacLeod |
Heraldic offices
| Preceded by John Horne Stevenson | Unicorn Pursuivant; 1925-1929 | Succeeded by Harold Andrew Balvaird Lawson |
| Preceded by Francis James Grant | Rothesay Herald; 1929-1939 | Succeeded by Harold Andrew Balvaird Lawson |
