= Unicorn Pursuivant =

Scottish pursuivant of arms

- The heraldic badge of Unicorn Pursuivant of Arms
- Heraldic tradition: Gallo-British
- Jurisdiction: Scotland
- Governing body: Court of the Lord Lyon

Unicorn Pursuivant of Arms in Ordinary is a current Scottish pursuivant of arms in Ordinary of the Court of the Lord Lyon.

The title was created after 1381, and derived from the unicorn. One of these beasts is used as a supporter for the royal arms of Scotland, and as a royal badge.

The badge of office is A unicorn couchant Argent, horned, unguled, maned and tufted Or gorged of a coronet of four fleurs-de-lys (two visible) and four crosses pattee (one and two halves visible) Or.

The office is currently held by Roderick Alexander Macpherson. He took part in the Royal Procession at the 2023 Coronation.

== Holders of the office ==
Arms	Name	Date of appointment	Ref
	John Fraser	1426	
	Adam Wallace of Craigie	1467	
	William Niven	1500	
	Thomas Pettigrew of Magdalensyde	1507	
	John Balfour	1528	
	Robert Hart	1543	
	William Hardy	1554	
	Alexander McCulloch	1560	
	Peter Ramsay	1567	
	Thomas Barrye	1570	
	Robert Fraser	1585	
	John Ramsay	1599	
	James Fuirde	1617	
	John Borthwick	1619	
	Thomas Fuirde	1633	
	George Wight	1635	
	Andrew Littlejohn	1636	
	Andrew Aitchinson	1646	
	William Malcolm	1660	
	William Hume	1683	
	Sir William Erskine of Cambo, Baronet	1707	
	James Kirkwood	1715	
	Charles Gordon	1719	
	William Boyd	1741	
	James Strachan	1760	
	Thomas Husband	1764	
	William Douglas	1764	
	Robert Grant	1790	
	David Anderson	1796	
	David Taylor	1806	
	James Cook	1825	
	James Sinclair	1845–1859	
	Andrew Gillman	1859–1860	
	Stuart Moodie Livingstone	1860–1902	
	John Horne Stevenson	1902–1925	
	Sir John Mackintosh Norman MacLeod, Baronet	1925–1929	
	Lt-Col. Harold Andrew Balvaird Lawson	1929–1939	
	Lt-Col. Gordon Dalyell of the Binns	1939–1953	
	Vacant	1953–1955	
	Sir Iain Moncreiffe of that Ilk, Baronet	1955–1961	
	John Inglis Drever "Don" Pottinger	1961–1981	
	Sir Crispin Agnew of Lochnaw, Baronet	1981–1986	
	Alastair Campbell of Airds	1986–2008	
	The Hon. Adam Bruce	2008–2012	
	Reginald John Malden	2012–2015	
	Liam Devlin	2016–2021	
	Roderick Alexander Macpherson	2021–Present	

== See also ==
- Officer of Arms
- Pursuivant
- Court of the Lord Lyon
- Heraldry Society of Scotland
