= Nevile Davidson =

Scottish minister

The Very Reverend Nevile Davidson DL ChStJ
- Moderator of the General Assembly
- Church: Church of Scotland
- In office: May 1962 to May 1963
- Predecessor: A. C. Craig
- Successor: James S. Stewart
- Other post: Minister of Glasgow Cathedral (1935–1967)

Orders
- Ordination: May 1925

Personal details
- Born: Andrew Nevile Davidson; 13 February 1899 North Berwick, East Lothian, Scotland
- Died: 20 December 1976 (aged 77)
- Buried: Glasgow Necropolis
- Education: North Berwick High School
- Alma mater: University of Edinburgh; New College, Edinburgh

Andrew Nevile Davidson, DL, ChStJ (13 February 1899 – 20 December 1976) was a senior Church of Scotland minister. He served as Moderator of the General Assembly between May 1962 and May 1963.

== Early life and education ==
Davidson was born on 13 February 1899 to the Revd James Davidson and his wife Constance (daughter of Sir Andrew Agnew, 8th Baronet). He was a "son of the manse", as his father was a Church of Scotland minister. He was educated at North Berwick High School. He studied philosophy at the University of Edinburgh and graduated with an undergraduate Master of Arts (MA Hons) degree in 1921.

Having graduated from university, Davidson remained in academia for the next three years. From 1921 to 1924, he was an assistant lecturer in logic and metaphysics at the University of Edinburgh. He worked under Professor Norman Kemp Smith. During this time, he also studied divinity at New College, Edinburgh in preparation for ordained ministry in the United Free Church of Scotland.

== Ordained ministry ==
From 1924 to 1925, Davidson served as an assistant minister at St George's, Edinburgh, as part of his training for ordination. In May 1925, he was ordained in the United Free Church of Scotland and called to be the minister of St Mary's Church, Old Aberdeen. It was during his time at St Mary's, in 1929, that the United Free Church of Scotland was incorporated into the Church of Scotland, and he therefore became of minister of the latter. In March 1932, he moved to Dundee where he had been elected the minister of St Enoch's Church; he had been the only nominee. He only spent two years in Dundee before moving on.

In November 1934, Davidson was elected the minister of Glasgow Cathedral in succession to the Very Revd Lauchlan Watt. He took up the appointment in 1935 and remained until his retirement. In 1936, he founded the Society of Friends of Glasgow Cathedral. In July 1946, he was appointed a Chaplain-in-Ordinary in Scotland to King George VI; the appointment ended on King George's death in 1952. In August 1952, he was appointed a Chaplain-in-Ordinary in Scotland to Queen Elizabeth II; the appointment ended in 1969. He was elected Moderator of the General Assembly of the Church of Scotland, serving between May 1962 and May 1963.

Davidson belonged to the high church tradition of Presbyterianism. He served as president of the Scottish Church Society twice; from 1945 to 1947, and from 1967 to 1970.

Davidson retired from full-time ministry in 1967.

== Military service ==
On 21 October 1935, Davidson was appointed an honorary chaplain in the Royal Navy Volunteer Reserve. During World War II, he served as a chaplain in the British Army. From 1940 to 1942, he served as a Chaplain to the Forces attached to the 52nd (Lowland) Division, Territorial Army.

== Later life ==
Davidson died on 20 December 1976. His funeral was held at Glasgow Cathedral on 24 December. He is buried with his wife in Glasgow Necropolis, Glasgow, Scotland.

== Personal life ==
Davidson's engagement to his future wife was announced in the newspapers on 23 November 1943. On 19 January 1944, he married Margaret Helen de Carteret "Peggy" Martin (1918-1991) during a service at Glasgow Cathedral.

== Honours ==
In July 1947, Davidson was appointed an Officer of the Venerable Order of St John (OStJ). In June 1950, he was promoted to Chaplain of the Venerable Order of St John (ChStJ). On 30 July 1962, he was appointed a Deputy Lieutenant (DL) to the Lord Provost of Glasgow. In April 1969, he was appointed an Extra-Chaplain in Scotland to Queen Elizabeth II.

Davidson was the recipient of the 1961 St Mungo Prize, awarded to the individual who has done most in the previous three years to improve and promote the city of Glasgow.
