= Harold Andrew Balvaird Lawson =

Colonel Harold Andrew Balvaird Lawson CVO DL (1899 – 1985) was a Scottish soldier and officer of arms in the Court of the Lord Lyon.

Between 1929 and 1939, Lawson was Unicorn Pursuivant, before serving as Rothesay Herald from 1939 until his death. In this capacity he participated in the Coronation of Elizabeth II in 1953. From 1929 to 1966 he was Lyon Clerk and Keeper of the Records. Lawson was appointed a Member of the Royal Victorian Order in the 1963 New Year Honours and he was made a Commander of the same order in the 1971 Birthday Honours.

Heraldic offices
Preceded by Francis James Grant	Lyon Clerk and Keeper of the Records; 1929-1966	Succeeded by Malcolm Innes of Edingight
Preceded by Sir John MacLeod, Bt	Unicorn Pursuivant; 1929-1939	Succeeded by Gordon Dalyell of the Binns
Preceded by Sir John MacLeod, Bt	Rothesay Herald; 1939-1985	Succeeded by Sir Crispin Agnew
