= Stair Agnew =

Scottish public official

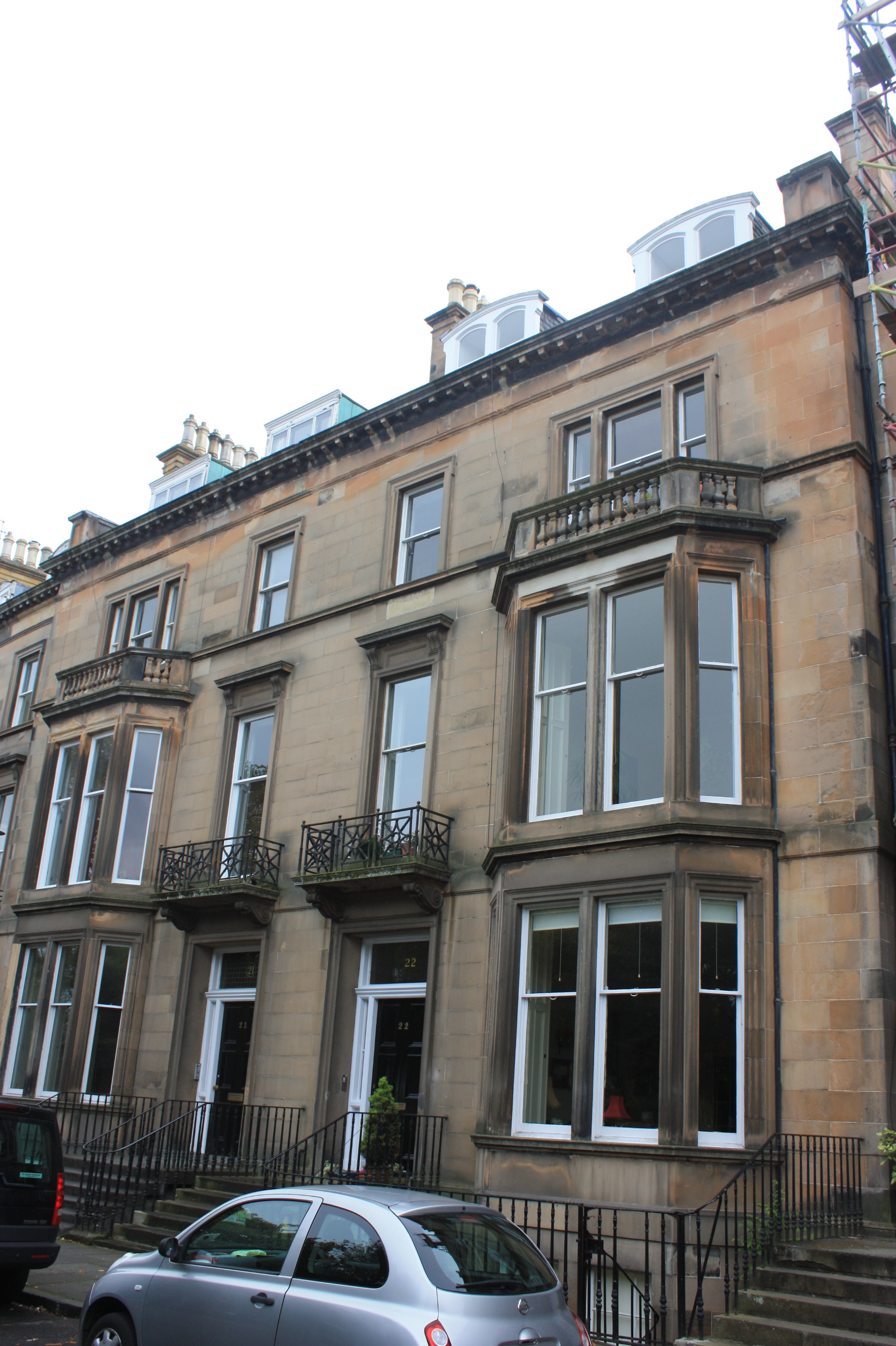
Stair Agnew's house at 22 Buckingham Terrace, Edinburgh

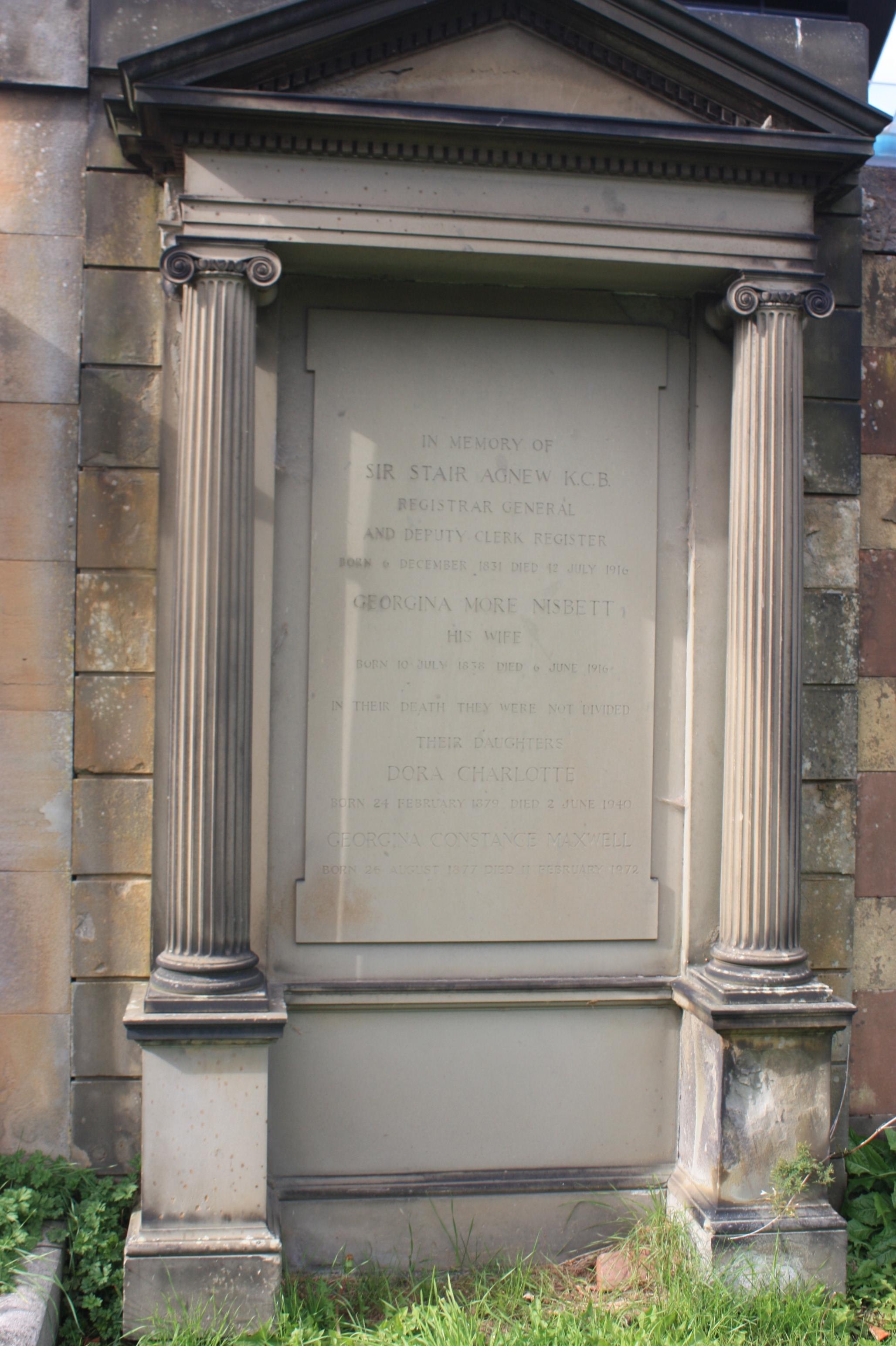
Stair Agnew's grave, Dean Cemetery

Sir Stair Agnew KCB FRSE (6 December 1831 – 12 July 1916) was a Scottish public official. He served as Registrar General for Scotland.

== Life ==
He was born at Lochnaw Castle in the parish of Leswalt in Dumfries and Galloway, the fifth son of Sir Andrew Agnew of Lochnaw, 7th Baronet and his wife, Madeline Carnegie.

He studied at Trinity College, Cambridge, graduating in 1855. He rowed in the Oxford and Cambridge boat race in 1854.

He worked as an Advocate from 1860, and was Legal Secretary to the Lord Advocate from 1861–1866 and 1868–1870, Queen's Remembrancer for Scotland from 1870–1881, and Registrar-General for Scotland and Keeper of the Records of Scotland and Deputy Clerk Register from 1881–1909.

In 1871 he was elected a Fellow of the Royal Society of Edinburgh, his proposer being Philip Kelland.

Agnew married a woman named Georgina More Nisbett (1838-1916), and they had at least three children: Stair Carnegie Agnew (born 1872), Georgina Constance Maxwell (born 1877) and Dora Charlotte (born 1879).

He was appointed Companion of the Order of the Bath (CB) in 1885 and promoted to Knight Commander of the Order of the Bath (KCB) in the 1895 Birthday Honours, thereby receiving a knighthood.

In 1905 he is listed as living at 22 Buckingham Terrace, just west of Dean Bridge in Edinburgh.

He is buried with his wife (who had died only a few weeks earlier) and daughters in Dean Cemetery in western Edinburgh. The grave is on the north wall of the north extension of the original cemetery, near the north-west corner.
