= John Horne Stevenson =

John Horne Stevenson KC (1855 – 1939) was a Scottish lawyer, officer of arms and author.

Stevenson was the son of Reverend R. H. Stevenson and Frances Cadell. He was educated at the University of Edinburgh.

A member of the Faculty of Advocates, he worked in the Court of the Lord Lyon and was appointed a King's Counsel in 1919. Stevenson was Unicorn Pursuivant between 1902 and 1925 and Marchmont Herald from 1925 until his death in 1939. He was a member of the Royal Company of Archers and a Knight of Grace of the Order of St John. He authored several books on the subjects of Scottish heraldry, title law and genealogy. He was a member of the Conservative Club, Edinburgh.

== Works ==
- The arms of the baronial and police burghs of Scotland (Edinburgh: Blackwood, 1903)
- The Register of the Great Seal of Scotland under the Commonwealth A.D. 1652-1659 (1904)
- The Ruthven of Freeland peerage and its critics (Glasgow: James MacLehose and Sons, 1905)
- Heraldry in Scotland (Glasgow: J. Maclehose and sons, 1914)
- The Scottish antiquary: or, Northern notes & queries (Edinburgh: W. Green and Sons)
- The story of the Argyll and Sutherland Highlanders: 91st & 93d Foot (Glasgow: J. MacLehose, 1915)

Heraldic offices
Preceded by Stuart Moodie Livingstone	Unicorn Pursuivant; 1902-1925	Succeeded by Sir John MacLeod, Bt
Preceded by Andrew Ross	Marchmont Herald; 1925-1939	Succeeded by John William Balfour Paul
