= Sir Andrew Agnew, 3rd Baronet =

Baronet

Sir Andrew Agnew, 3rd Baronet (died 1702) was a Scottish shire commissioner of parliament who was the son of Sir Andrew Agnew, 2nd Baronet and Lady Anne Stewart.

== Succession ==
He succeeded his father as 3rd Baronet Agnew, of Lochnaw on the latter's death in 1671. On his death in 1702 he was succeeded in the baronetcy by his third son, his elder sons having predeceased him.

== Career ==
He was shire commissioner for Wigtownshire in 1685 and 1689–1702.

== Family ==
He married Jane Hay, daughter of Thomas Hay and Jean Hamilton (24 October 1656), and had issue:

- Andrew Agnew
- Thomas Agnew (d.16902)
- Grizel Agnew, married Sir Charles Hay, 2nd Baronet (1685)
- Sir James Agnew, 4th Baronet (c1660-1735)

Baronetage of Nova Scotia
Preceded by Andrew Agnew	Baronet (of Lochnaw); 1671–1702	Succeeded by James Agnew
