= John Holmes Agnew =

John Holmes Agnew (4 May 1804 — 1865) was the first editor of The Eclectic Magazine, a professor of ancient languages at the University of Michigan and a member of the Presbyterian clergy.
