= Lady Agnew of Lochnaw =

Painting by John Singer Sargent

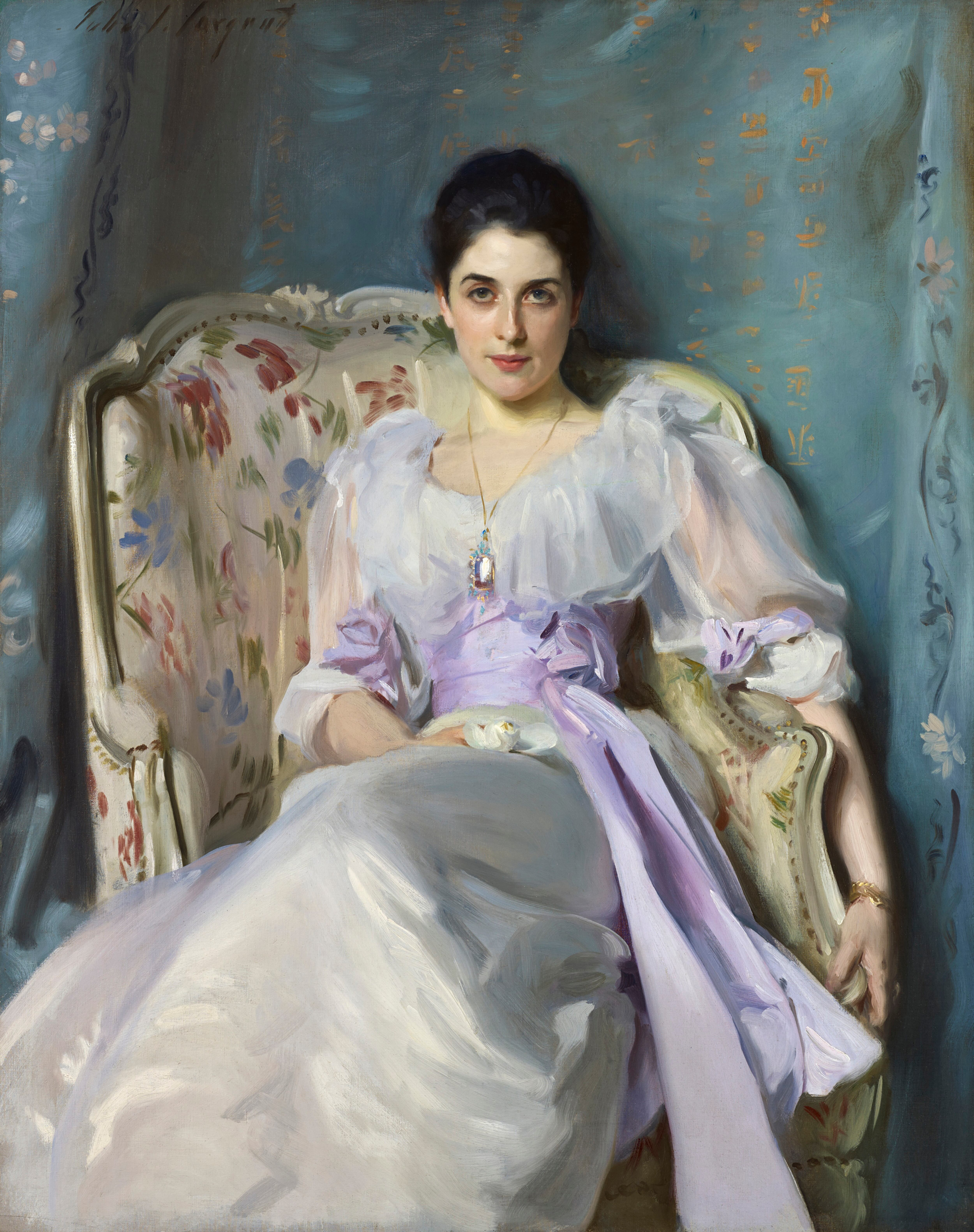
- Artist: John Singer Sargent
- Year: 1892
- Medium: Oil on canvas
- Dimensions: 127 cm × 101 cm (50 in × 40 in)
- Location: Scottish National Gallery; Edinburgh

Lady Agnew of Lochnaw is an oil on canvas portrait painting of Gertrude Agnew, the wife of Sir Andrew Agnew, 9th Baronet. The painting was commissioned in 1892 and completed the same year by the American portrait artist John Singer Sargent. It measures 127 × 101 cm (50.0 × 39.8 in) and is owned by the Scottish National Gallery in Edinburgh, Scotland. The museum acquired it through the Cowan Smith Bequest Fund in 1925.

== Background ==
Gertrude Vernon was born in 1864, the daughter of the Hon. Gowran Vernon and granddaughter of Robert Vernon, 1st Baron Lyveden. She married Sir Andrew Noel Agnew, 9th Baronet of Lochnaw Castle in Wigtownshire in 1889. A few years later, during 1892, he commissioned John Singer Sargent to paint her portrait. The success of the painting endowed her with additional notoriety and prestige. There is speculation that the family may have met with financial difficulties resulting in an attempt to sell the painting to the Trustees of the Frick Collection in 1922 but the offer was rejected by Helen Clay Frick. (Note: The source states Lady Agnew was a widow at the time of the offer in 1922 but her husband did not die until 1928.) Lady Agnew died in London in April 1932 after suffering ill health for a long time.

== Description ==
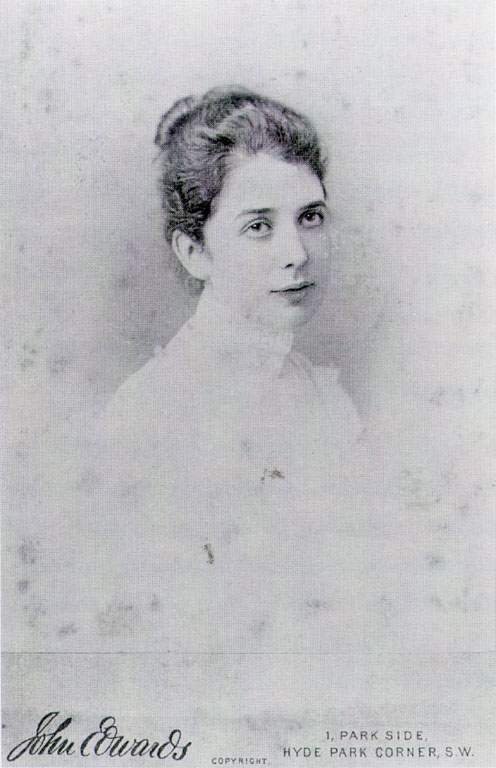
Gertrude Vernon at the time of her engagement

Lady Agnew is seated in an 18th-century French Bergère and, according to art historian Richard Ormond, the back of the chair is used as a "curving, supporting space to contain the figure, creating a distinctive, languid elegance". Sargent pictured her in a three-quarter length pose, dressed in a white gown with a silk mauve sash as an accessory round her waist. The wall behind her is draped with Chinese silk of a blue colour. She looks directly and appraisingly, her expression capturing the impression she is participating in an "intimate conversation" with those observing the painting. Ormond and Kilmurray remark that she was convalescing from influenza at the time, which may account for the languor in her pose. They describe her gaze as "quietly challenging" and "something withheld and inviting in her quizzical half-smile".

The oil on canvas measures 127 × 101 cm (50.0 × 39.8 in). The portrait was exhibited at the Royal Academy, London, in 1893 and may have been influential in the artist's acceptance as an associate of the Academy the following January. According to an unattributed article in The Times dated 29 April 1893, the portrait was "not only a triumph of technique but the finest example of portraiture, in the literal sense of the word, that has been seen here for a long time. While Mr Sargent has abandoned none of his subtlety, he has abandoned his mannerisms, and has been content to make a beautiful picture of a charming subject, under conditions of repose." The writer also felt it was a "masterpiece". Other exhibitions it featured in were at Boston's Copley Hall in 1899 and the Carnegie Institute, Pittsburgh during 1924.

The painting still hangs in its original antique French rococo frame. It is not known if this is the same frame Sargent described in an 1893 letter to Sir Andrew: "Today I saw an old frame which I think might suit the picture... It is expensive, I think £20, and unless the picture should look remarkably well in it, hardly worth the money".

According to the Scottish National Gallery, "the cumulative cost of sustaining celebrity with style obliged Lady Agnew to sell her own portrait". The painting was acquired with assistance from the Cowan Smith Bequest Fund in 1925. It was retitled as Lady Agnew of Lochnaw at her request (formerly it had been titled simply Lady Agnew). There are two letters from her about the sale of the painting in the gallery's archives. The first of these indicates that she had decided against letting it go to an American in New York and had offered it to the gallery for £4,000 (equivalent to £210,254 in 2025). At the time Noel Agnew commissioned the portrait, Sargent's fee for a three-quarter-length portrait was about £500. After the gallery was extended around 1978, the additional area allowed space for the portrait to be displayed.

== See also ==
- List of works by John Singer Sargent
