= Agnew, West Virginia =

Unincorporated community in West Virginia, United States

- Unincorporated community
- Location within West Virginia Location within the United States
- Coordinates: 38°12′45″N 81°08′34″W
- Country: United States
- State: West Virginia
- County: Fayette
- Elevation: 768 ft (234 m)
- Time zone: UTC-5 (Eastern (EST))
  - Summer (DST): UTC-4 (EDT)
- Area codes: 304 & 681
- GNIS feature ID: 1556046

Agnew is an unincorporated community in Fayette County, West Virginia, United States. Agnew is 4 miles (6.4 km) northeast of Gauley Bridge.
