= Fulque Agnew =

Baronet

Sir Fulque Agnew

Sir Fulque Melville Gerald Noel Agnew, 10th Baronet (6 October 1900, Bangalore, India – 28 August 1975, Mzuzu, Malawi) was the son of Major Charles Hamlyn Agnew (3rd son of Sir Andrew Agnew of Lochnaw, 8th Baronet, and Lady Louisa Noel or Agnew of Lochnaw, daughter of Charles Noel, 1st Earl of Gainsborough) and his wife Lillian Anne Wolfe Murray of Cringltie, daughter of General Sir James Wolfe Murray of Cringltie KCB, married on 30 June 1897 but they divorced in 1908.

== Succession ==
He succeeded as 10th Baronet, of Lochnaw on the death of his uncle Sir Andrew Noel Agnew of Lochnaw, 9th Baronet, on 14 July 1928. He did not use the title in later life. On his death in 1975 he was succeeded in the baronetcy by his son Crispin Agnew.

== Education ==
He attended Harrow School, spent a year at Heidelberg University in the mid-1930s, and graduated as BSc as a mature student at the University of Edinburgh in the 1940s.

== Career ==
In World War I he ran away from school at the age 17 to join the Machine Gun Corps as a private, although he was under age. He later flew in the Royal Flying Corps as a cadet; he recounted that he had a dog fight with the Red Baron, but as both aircraft had run out of ammunition both returned safely. He was commissioned as an Honorary 2nd Lt RFC 14 May 1920 [London Gazette]; he was shot down and wounded, spending a year in hospital and is said to have been Mentioned in Despatches.

After the war in 1921 he joined the 17th (later 17/21st) Lancers as a trooper with a view to obtaining a regular commission, and served in Ireland. He did not obtain a commission due to the post-war reductions in the armed forces and resigned from the 17/21st in November 1922. He joined Roger Pocock's. expedition to cross the Atlantic, and left the ship in San Francisco. He then got work as an extra in Hollywood, including driving a chariot in the first Ben Hur film. He then joined the US cavalry and subsequently the US Marine Corps serving in China. In 1928 on succeeding to the baronetcy he returned to Britain and farmed in Sussex for about a year, later joining the 4th Bn East Sussex Regiment as a lieutenant before again attempting to get a regular commission. From about 1934 to 1937 he spent time in Europe: studying at Heidelberg University; walking in Southern Germany; canoeing down the Danube and walking in the Balkans. The family understood that he worked for British Intelligence during this period.

During the Second World War he registered as a conscientious objector, and served in the Friends Ambulance Unit in London and Greece. On 29 January 1945 Agnew was in charge of FAU Relief Detachment No 1 which arrived in Simi for relief work.

In 1948 he went to India, but could not obtain a permanent post there after independence. He worked, probably with the Red Cross, in refugee camps during the disruptions caused by the partition of India. He then emigrated to farm in South Africa in 1948 - his wife Swanzie Erskine's family having been in South Africa since 1857. Her grandfather, St Vincent Whitshed Erskine had been a Surveyor in South Africa. In 1952 Agnew was appointed Registrar of Fort Hare University, Cape Province, the only university then awarding degrees to black Africans. Swanzie taught geography and became head of the geography department. They allied with the opponents of apartheid, and in 1960, when the army was sent in to clamp down on unrest, the Agnews protested strongly. As a result, they, and other British staff, were expelled from South Africa.

Back in Britain, Agnew went to work for the University of Cambridge's Department of Education. In 1965 Swanzie Agnew was elected the first Professor of Earth Sciences at the University of Malawi, and Agnew joined her as Assistant Registrar at the university for a short period until an African took over. In retirement he indulged his hobby of Bird Watching. He died at Mzuzu, Malawi in 1975 while on a trip to the Nyika National Park.

== Family ==
Lady Agnew

He married Swanzie Erskine (9 June 1916 – 28 September 2000) in London on 9 October 1937. She was the daughter of Major Esmé Nourse Erskine CMG, MC formerly British Consul in Western Abyssinia (a cadet branch of the Earls of Buchan) and Elizabeth Susan Matilda Reinders. They had issue:

- Crispin Agnew, 11th Baronet (b.13 May 1944)

Swanzie Erskine was a lecturer in Geography at Edinburgh University during World War II and then Head of the Department of Geography, University of Fort Hare University, South Africa (1955 to 1960). Following deportation from South Africa in 1960 she was Headmistress of the lower Royal Ballet School, White Lodge, Richmond Park, London (1960 to 1964). In 1964 she was offered the Professorship of Earth Sciences at the new University of Malawi and served there until she resigned in 1976 in protest at the interference in academic life by the Banda Government. She retired to Edinburgh, Scotland, where she lived until she died in 2000.

Baronetage of Nova Scotia
| Preceded by Andrew Agnew | Baronet (of Lochnaw); 1928–1975 | Succeeded by Crispin Agnew |
