= Sir Andrew Agnew, 9th Baronet =

British politician

Sir Andrew Noel Agnew, 9th Baronet, JP (14 August 1850 – 14 July 1928) was a British Liberal Unionist Member of Parliament.

== Succession ==
Agnew was the son of Sir Andrew Agnew, 8th Baronet and Lady Mary Arabella Louisa Noel, daughter of Charles Noel, 1st Earl of Gainsborough and his 3rd wife Arabella Hamlyn-Williams. He succeeded his father as 9th Baronet, of Lochnaw on the latter's death on 25 March 1892. On his own death in 1928 he was succeeded in the baronetcy by his nephew Fulque Agnew.

== Education ==
He attended Windlesham House School, Harrow School and Trinity College, Cambridge.

== Career ==
Agnew was commissioned a second lieutenant in the 1st Ayrshire and Galloway Artillery Volunteers on 28 February 1900, and rose to the rank of captain before he retired. He was Liberal Unionist Member of Parliament (MP) for Edinburgh South from 1900 to 1906. He was appointed a Deputy Lieutenant of Wigtownshire on 21 March 1904. He was Justice of the Peace for Wigtownshire.

== Family ==
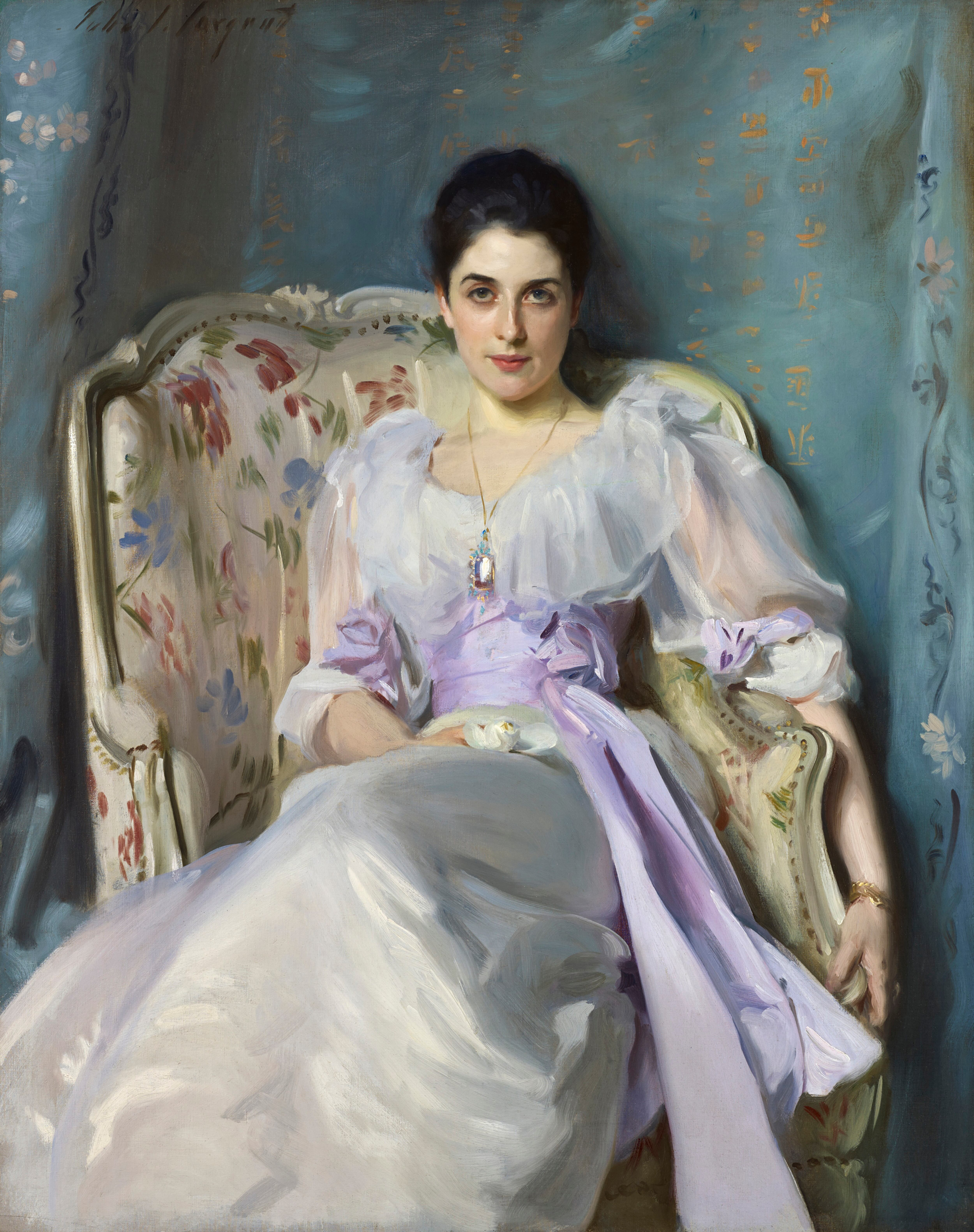
Lady Agnew of Lochnaw, John Singer Sargent, 1892

He married Gertrude Vernon, daughter of Hon. Gowran Charles Vernon and Caroline Fazakerley, on 15 October 1889, but the marriage produced no children. Lady Agnew was the subject of a famous portrait by John Singer Sargent.

Parliament of the United Kingdom
Preceded by Arthur Dewar	Member of Parliament for Edinburgh South; 1900 – 1906	Succeeded by Arthur Dewar
Baronetage of Nova Scotia
Preceded by Andrew Agnew	Baronet (of Lochnaw); 1892–1928	Succeeded by Fulque Agnew
