= Sir Patrick Agnew, 1st Baronet =

Sir Patrick Agnew, 1st Baronet (c. 1578–1661) was the son of Sir Andrew Agnew of Lochnaw and Agnes Stewart.

== Succession ==
He was created 1st Baronet Agnew, of Lochnaw on 28 July 1629. On his death in 1661 he was succeeded in the baronetcy by his eldest son. He was buried at Leswalt.

== Career ==
He was Member of the Parliament of Scotland for Wigtownshire, 1628–1633 and 1643–1647.

== Family ==
He married Margaret Kennedy, daughter of Sir Thomas Kennedy, Master of Cassillis and Elizabeth McGill, (c1598), and had issue:

- Sir Andrew Agnew, 2nd Baronet (d.1671)
- Lt.-Col. James Agnew (d. c1661)
- Patrick Agnew, 1st of Sheuchan
- Lt.-Col. Alexander Agnew, 1st of Whitehills
- Jane Agnew, married Alexander MacDowall (1621)
- Agnes Agnew, married Uchtred MacDowall (1622)
- Marie Agnew, married Hew MacDowall
- Rosina Agnew, married John Cathcart (1632)
- Elizabeth Agnew, married John Baillie

Baronetage of Nova Scotia
New creation	Baronet (of Lochnaw); 1629–1661	Succeeded by Andrew Agnew
