= Mark Agnew =

UK adventurer

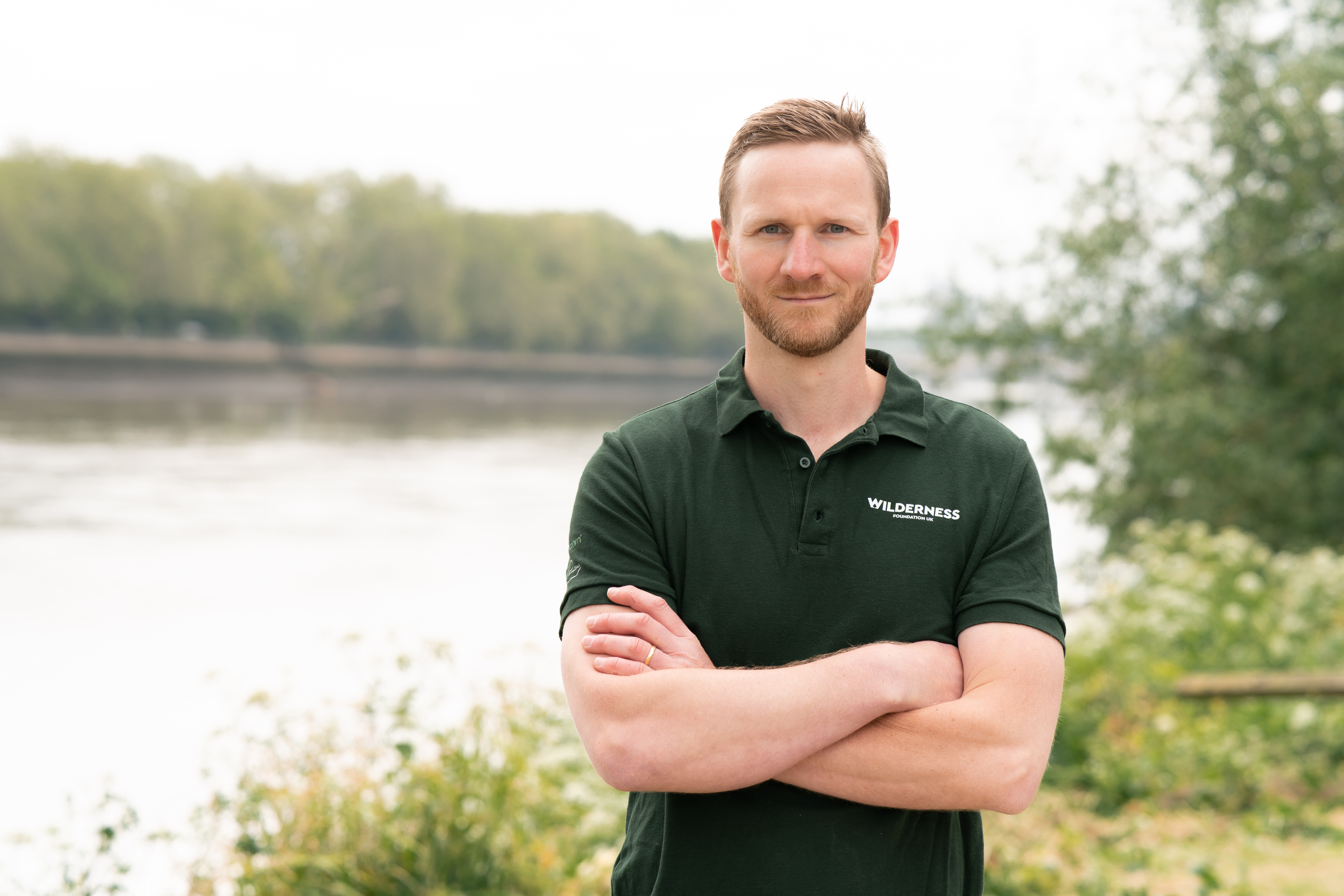
Mark Agnew is an adventurer and keynote speaker. Photo: Matt Jones

Mark Agnew is a British adventurer notable for kayaking the Northwest Passage. He was awarded European Adventurer of the Year 2023. He is the heir apparent to the Agnew baronets of Lochnaw, being the son of explorer Sir Crispin Agnew. He is a Fellow of the Royal Geographical Society. Agnew now works as an international keynote speaker, focusing on themes such as resilience, change and organisational performance.

Agnew was born in 1991 in Edinburgh. He attended Fettes College. He went to Newcastle University. Agnew lived in Hong Kong from 2013 to 2021. In Hong Kong, Agnew was the Outdoor and Extreme Sports Editor of the South China Morning Post.

Agnew and three teammates kayaked the Northwest Passage. He, expedition leader West Hansen, Jeff Wueste and Eileen Visser, known as The Arctic Cowboys, were in two tandem kayaks, supported by their shore team Tom McGuire and Barbara Edington. They are the first people to kayak the entire Northwest Passage, and the first people to complete the route by human power, without the use of sails or motors, in a single season. They kayaked from Baffin Bay to the Beaufort Sea, the recognised boundaries of the Northwest Passage as defined by the International Hydrographic Organization. They experienced extreme cold and dangerous polar bear encounters. Agnew and his fellow expedition members were subsequently charged with various offences under Canadian environmental and wildlife legislation for allegedly entering a National Park without permits. All charges were withdrawn.

In 2013, a team of rowers attempted the Northwest Passage by human power; in 2019, two kayakers also attempted it. In 2023, as Agnew and the team kayaked the Northwest Passage, two other rowing teams were attempting the human powered world first. No one had succeeded until Agnew and his team.

Agnew has failed to row the Atlantic Ocean twice, once in 2016, and again in 2018 with a team called Atlantic Albatross. He experienced a mental health crisis as a result of the failures.
