= Alex Agnew =

Stand-up comic, rock musician

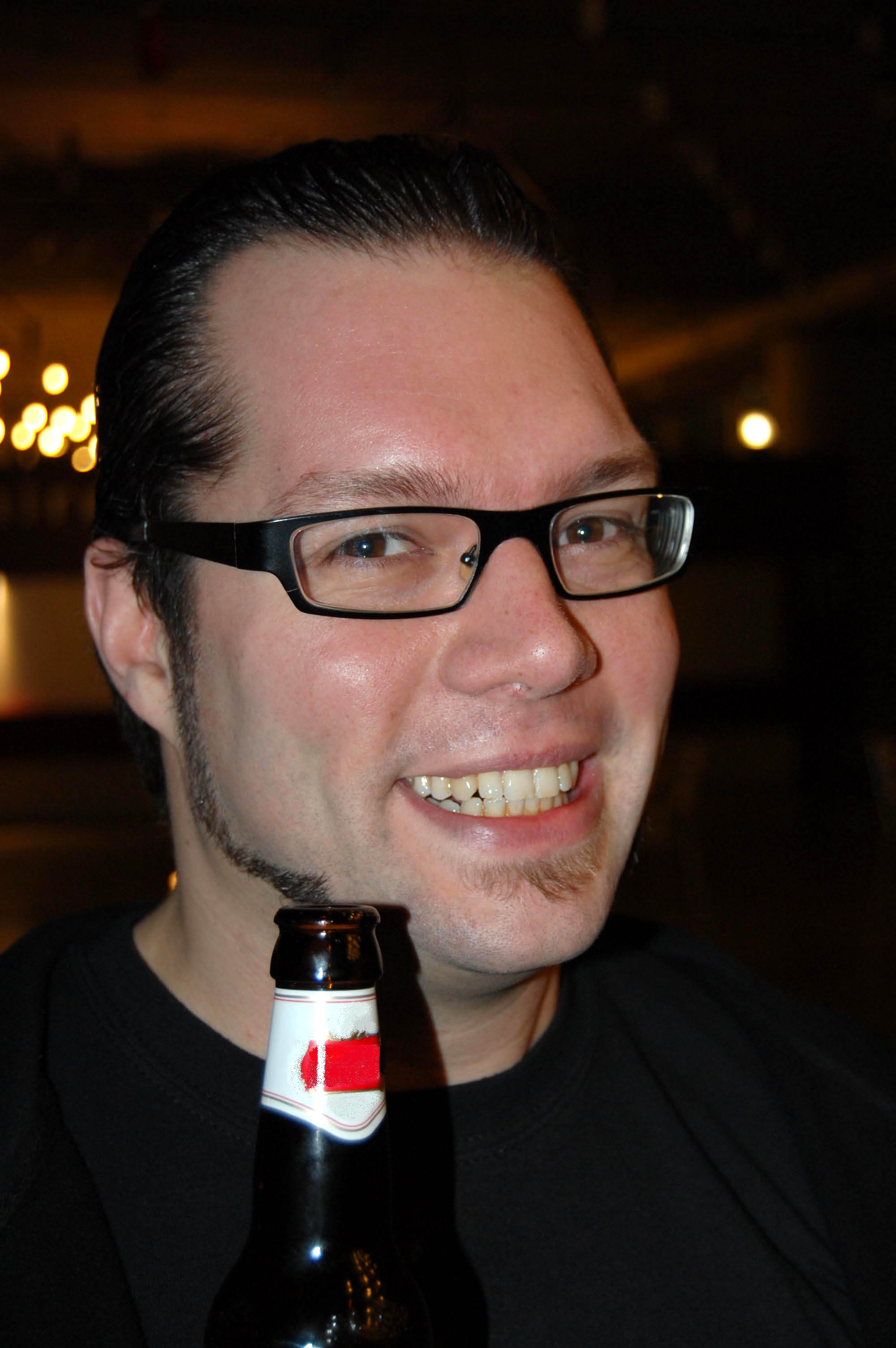
- Alex Agnew at the Comedy Casino Festival in Gent, Belgium
- Born: 22 December 1972 (age 53); Antwerp, Belgium

Comedy career
- Years active: 1999 – 2012 2018 – present
- Medium: Blue comedy, physical comedy, improvisational comedy, satire
- Musical career
- Genre: Hard rock
- Occupations: Comedian and singer
- Instrument: Voice
- Years active: 2001-present
- Website: www.alexagnew.be

Alex Agnew (born 22 December 1972) is a Belgian stand-up comedian and hard rock vocalist. According to the Nigel Williams autobiography "Had ik maar een vak geleerd" ("If Only I'd Learned a Proper Trade"), Alex was already an established comedian in Belgium since at least the 1999–2000 season. This is somewhat contradicted by the 2011 show "Larger than Life", celebrating "the best of Agnew 10 years on stage". Undisputedly however, he attained nationwide fame when he became the first Belgian to win the prestigious Dutch Leids Cabaret Festival in February 2003.

After this initial success he has been performing in comedy shows like De Bovenste Plank and Comedy Casino on the Belgian television channel Canvas.

Agnew is the son of an English father, footballer John Agnew, and a Flemish mother. He is influenced by action movies, superheroes, comic books and a great variety of music, ranging from Tom Jones and musicals to heavy metal and the new-age music his sister played.

His "rock 'n' roll comedy" (as he himself calls it) is mostly a mix of blue comedy and the production of sound effects, similar to Dutch-Moroccan comedian Najib Amhali. Besides his comedy activities, he is also the lead vocalist of hard rock band Diablo Blvd.

His first solo comedy show, "KA-BOOM!", spanned the whole 2005–2006 season. Early 2007 Agnew kicked off his new show, "Morimos Solamente". He toured Belgium with the show "More Human than Human" in the 2009–2010 season. After filling up the Antwerp Sportpaleis 5 times over throughout 2011 with his best-of show "Larger than Life" supported by Steve Hughes. In 2012 and 2013 he toured with his show "interesting times".

On 16 September 2012 Agnew announced his "indefinite" retirement from stand-up comedy on his official website and Belgian public television. He cites his commitment to Diablo Blvd. as the main reason for his departure from the stage. In 2017 Agnew came back with a show that was appropriately titled "Unfinished Business". Right now he's writing material for his latest show "Be Careful What You Wish For"

Agnew's wife runs a popular comedy club, The Joker, in Antwerp.

== Shows ==
- KA-BOOM (2005–2006)
- Morimos Solamente (2007–2008)
- More Human than Human (2009–2010)
- Larger than Life (2011)
- Interesting Times (2011–2013)
- Interesting Times: The Legend Ends (October 25,26 2013)
- Unfinished Business (2016-2017)
- Be Careful What You Wish For (2019)
- Wake Me Up When It's Over (2022)

== Awards ==
1st in Leids Cabaret Festival (2003) (First Belgian winner)
