= Agnew-Somerville baronets =

- Escutcheon of the Agnew-Somerville baronets of Clendry
- Creation date: 1957
- Status: extant
- Motto: Over the 1st crest: Crains Dieu tant que tu vivras (Fear God as long as you live); Over the 2nd crest: Consilio et impetu (By wisdom and vigour)
- Arms: Quarterly, 1st and 4th: Azure three mullets Or, two and one, between seven cross-crosslets fitchée, three, one, two and one argent, a canton voided of the last charged with four mullets Gules and as many cross-crosslets fitchée sable (Somerville); 2nd and 3rd: Parted per saltire Argent and Gules, two cinquefoils in pale and as many saltires couped in fess, all counterchanged, a bordure Azure (Agnew).
- Crest: 1st, A demi lion Rampant Sable, charged on the shoulder with a cross-crosslet fitchée between two mullets Argent (Somerville); 2nd, An eagles rising reguardant Proper, holding in the dexter claw a sword Proper hilted and pommelled Or (Agnew).

The Agnew, later Agnew-Somerville baronetcy of Clendry was created on 31 January 1957 for the naval officer and politician Peter Garnett Agnew.

== Agnew, later Agnew-Somerville baronets, of Clendry (1957) ==
- Sir Peter Garnett Agnew, 1st Baronet (1900–1990)
- Sir Quentin Charles Agnew-Somerville, 2nd Baronet (8 March 1929 – 2010). He assumed by Royal Licence in 1950 the additional surname of Somerville, after that of Agnew, and the arms of Somerville quarterly with those of Agnew, in compliance with the will of his uncle by marriage James Somerville, 2nd Baron Athlumney.
- Sir (James) Lockett Charles Agnew-Somerville, 3rd Baronet (born 1970)

As of 2026, there is no heir to the baronetcy.

== Extended family ==
The actress Geraldine Somerville is a daughter of the 2nd Baronet.
