= Crispin Agnew =

Scottish advocate, herald, and explorer (born 1944)

Sir Crispin Agnew of Lochnaw Bt LVO KC FRGS
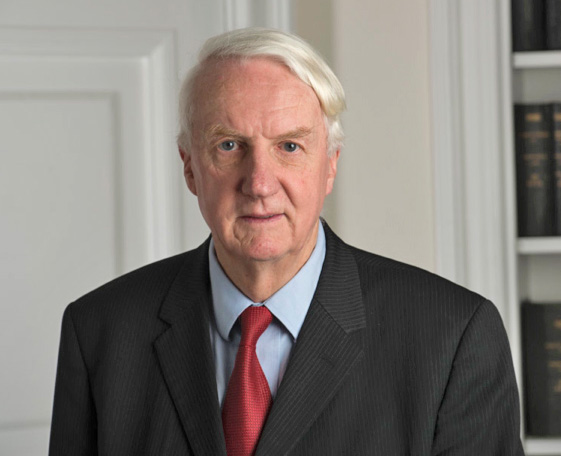

King's Counsel

Personal details
- Born: Crispin Hamlyn Agnew yr of Lochnaw; 13 May 1944 (age 82) Edinburgh, Scotland
- Spouse(s): Susan Rachel Strang Steel, Lady Agnew of Lochnaw
- Children: 4 - Isabel, Emma, Roseanna and Mark
- Profession: Army Officer, Explorer, Advocate (King's Counsel), Albany Herald Extraordinary

Military service
- Branch/service: Royal Highland Fusiliers 1964-1981
- Years of service: 1962–1981.
- Rank: Major

Sir Crispin Hamlyn Agnew of Lochnaw, 11th Baronet, LVO, KC, FRGS (born 13 May 1944) is a Scottish advocate, herald and former explorer. He is the chief of the ancient Agnew family, and the eleventh holder of the Agnew baronetcy, created in 1629. He was elected a member of the Royal Company of Archers, the King's Body Guard for Scotland in 1975.

Agnew is the only son of Sir Fulque Agnew and his wife Swanzie Erskine, granddaughter of St Vincent Whitshed Erskine, latterly Professor of Geography at the University of Malawi. He succeeded his father in 1975.

Sir Crispin was born in Edinburgh, but emigrated to South Africa with his parents aged 3 year. At the age of 12 he was sent back to school in the UK. He was educated at Uppingham School from 1958 to 1962. He was a member of the British Schools Exploring Society (now British Exploring Society) Arctic Scandinavia Expedition 1961. He attended RMA Sandhurst (Intake 33 1962-1964), before being commissioned into the Royal Highland Fusiliers in 1964. He served in Germany, Cyprus, Northern Ireland and the UK. As an active climber and mountaineer and member of the Army Mountaineering Association and the Alpine Club (UK) he was involved with the army's policy of developing adventurous training for soldiers of all ranks. He took part in or led a number of expeditions, including expeditions to Api (mountain) in 1980, Everest in 1976, Nuptse Himal in 1975, Northern Patagonian Ice Field in 1973, Elephant Island in 1970, and Greenland in 1968 and 1966. He retired as a major in 1981.

Agnew is a King's Counsel and was in practice at the Scottish Bar with Westwater Advocates before going non-practising in April 2020. He was ranked by Chambers & Partners UK 2018 as a "Star Individual" in Agriculture and Rural Affairs and "Band 1" in Planning and Environment. He specialised in rural property, planning & environmental, and public law. He was made an Honorary Research Fellow at the University of Dundee in 2020. He is the author of legal textbooks on agriculture, crofting, land obligations and liquor licensing as well as articles in academic journals. He served as a part-time judge of the Upper Tribunal (formerly Social Security Commissioner) (2000 to 2018) and was part-time legal chairman of the Pension Appeal Tribunal (2002 to 2012). He is a legal convenor of the Mental Health Tribunal for Scotland (2018-).

His heraldic career began in 1978 when he was appointed Slains Pursuivant by Merlin, Earl of Erroll. In 1981, he was appointed Unicorn Pursuivant at the Court of the Lord Lyon in Edinburgh. In 1986, he was promoted to Rothesay Herald, a position he held until 31 August 2021, when he became Albany Herald Extraordinary.

Agnew was a trustee of the John Muir Trust from 1989 to 2005 and was a Council Member and Board Member of Hostelling Scotland from 2008 to 2012. He was convenor of the Scottish Committee for 10 years and then Scottish Patron till 2020 of the United Kingdom Environmental Law Association (UKELA) and is active with their Wild Law Group.

He was appointed Lieutenant of the Royal Victorian Order (LVO) in the 2021 Birthday Honours.

In 1980 he married Susan Rachel Strang Steel, PgDip (2010), MSc (2025), an academic skills adviser, formerly with Edinburgh Napier University until 2025, also a careers adviser with The Career Place, Edinburgh and formerly a journalist and broadcaster, the daughter of Jock Wykeham Strang Steel and Lesley Graham. Agnew and his wife have a son and three daughters: Mark, Isabel, Emma and Roseanna. Adventurer Mark Agnew is the Younger of Lochnaw, and the heir to the chiefship and baronetcy.

== Selected works ==
=== BOOKS ===
- Agnew, Sir Crispin and Baillie H.M. (1984 - 2002), Alan & Chapman's Annotations of the Licensing (Scotland) Act 1976, WGreen, 2nd (1984) to 5th (2002) Editions. 5th Ed ISBN 0414 014 88X
- Agnew, Sir Crispin (1996), Agricultural Law in Scotland, Butterworths. ISBN 0406115141
- Agnew, Sir Crispin and Rennie D.G. (1996), Connell on the Agricultural Holdings (Scotland) Acts 7th Ed, T & T Clark. ISBN 0567005143
- Agnew, Sir Crispin (1999), Variation and Discharge of Land Obligations, WGreen. ISBN 0414012267
- Agnew, Sir Crispin (2000), Crofting Law, T & T Clark. ISBN 056700547X

=== ARTICLES ===
- Agnew, Sir Crispin, "The Baronets of Nova Scotia." The Double Tressure, Journal of the Heraldry Society of Scotland (1979); No. 1 pp 35 to 43.
- Agnew, Sir Crispin. "Who were the Baronets of Nova Scotia". The Scottish Genealogist (1980); Vol. XXVI No. 3 September 1980 pp 90 – 111.
- Agnew, Crispin. (1988). "The Conflict of Heraldic Laws". The Juridical Review. 1988 Pt 1. 61–76.
- Agnew, Sir Crispin . "Baronial heraldic additaments", 2004 Scots Law Times (News) 179.
- Agnew, Sir Crispin, and Roseanna CN Agnew. "Protecting badger setts–Where law and science clash." Environmental Law Review 18.1 (2016): 8-24.
- Agnew, Sir Crispin, Thomas Appleby, and Emma Bean. "The ownership of inshore fisheries in Scotland: An opportunity for community ownership?" Journal of Water Law 26.2 (2018).
- Agnew, Sir Crispin, Appleby, T., Bean, E. & Bunware, P. (2019). "Fishing or fish farming: the conflict between a Crown grant of salmon fishings in the seas and other Crown rights in the sea in Scotland". Environmental Law and Management. 31, 5, p 193-203.
- Sir Crispin Agnew of Lochnaw Bt, and Gillian Black. "The significance of status and genetics in succession to titles, honours, dignities and coats of arms: Making the case for reform". The Cambridge Law Journal, vol. 77, no. 2, 2018, pp. 321–348.
- Agnew, Sir Crispin and Sarah Hendry (2020). "The impact of riparian and other public rights in Scotland on the delivery of 'run of the river' hydro schemes: Time for a new approach." Journal of Water Law 27(1) p3.
- Agnew, Sir Crispin and Jahan, I. (2021). "A critical analysis of the development of the concept of giving rivers a personality: does it in fact help to protect the rivers?" Journal of Water Law, 27(3), 77-88.
- Agnew, Sir Crispin. "Soldiers in Greenland – 1930 to 1990". (2021) British Army Review, No. 180 Spring/Summer 2021 pp. 112-121.
- Agnew, Sir Crispin (2022). "The 'capacity' dichotomy for Mental Health Tribunals Scotland". Juridical Review, Issue 3, p. 125-147
- Sir Crispin Agnew of Lochnaw Bt, and Gillian Black. "Reforming the law of succession to peerages, baronetcies and dignities: identifying problems and exploring solutions". Public Law, vol. 2023, no. 1, 2023, pp. 104–125.
- Agnew, Sir Crispin. "Giving the River Clyde a Legal Personality" (2025) 229 SPEL 61.
- Scrase D., Boyle S., Crabtree L., & Agnew, Sir Crispin. (2026). "Ecosystem Collapse, Food Insecurity and the UK: Integrating National Security and Long-term Food System Reform". International In-house Counsel Journal Vol 19, No. 76 Summer 2006, 1 - 19.

=== EXPEDITION ARTICLES ===
- C.H. Agnew of Lochnaw yr., 1972. "Elephant Island". Alpine Journal, 1972. pp. 204-210.
- C.H. Agnew of Lochnaw yr and Gobey, C.S., 1974. "The Joint Services Expedition to Chilean Patagonia 1972-73". Geographical Journal, pp.262-268.
- C.H. Agnew, 1974. "Crossing the Hielo Patagonia del Norte". Alpine Journal, 1974. pp. 42-46.
- Sir Crispin Agnew of Lochnaw, 1981. "Soldiers on Api". Alpine Journal, 1981. pp.167-171.

== Arms ==
Coat of arms of Sir Crispin Agnew of Lochnaw
Notes This coat of arms with the chevron first appears on the seal of Quentin Agnew of Lochnaw c 1487, previous versions having been recorded featuring three hands in the Hague Armorial Roll (c 1590) and Sir George Mackenzie's "Science of Herauldry" (1680). Crest Above the shield, from which is pendent by an orange-tawny riband the Badge of a Baronet of Nova Scotia, is placed a Chapeau Azure furred Ermine, and thereon an Helm befitting his degree with a Mantling Gules doubled Argent, and on a Wreath of the Liveries is set for Crest an eagle issuant and reguardant Proper Escutcheon Argent, a chevron between two cinquefoils in chief Gules and a saltire couped in base Azure. Supporters Two heraldic tygers Proper, collared and chained Or Motto CONSILIO NON IMPETU

Baronetage of Nova Scotia
Preceded by Fulque Agnew	Baronet (of Lochnaw); 1975–present	Incumbent
Heraldic offices
Preceded by Don Pottinger	Unicorn Pursuivant; 1981-1986	Succeeded by Alastair Campbell of Airds
Preceded by Harold Andrew Balvaird Lawson	Rothesay Herald; 1986-2021	Succeeded by Liam Devlin
Preceded by John Spens	Albany Herald; 2021-Present	Incumbent
