= Michael Stapleton-Cotton, 5th Viscount Combermere =

Michael Wellington Stapleton-Cotton, 5th Viscount Combermere (8 August 1929 – 3 November 2000) was a British academic and Crossbencher in the House of Lords. He was the eldest son of Francis Stapleton-Cotton, 4th Viscount Combermere.

== Career ==
He was educated at Eton, after which he served first with the Palestine Police Force, 1947–48, and then the Royal Canadian Mounted Police, 1948–50, and thereafter served for eight years with the Royal Air Force, retiring in 1958 in the rank of flight lieutenant. He then went on to study at King's College London in 1962, graduating with a lower second-class honours Bachelor of Divinity degree and a Master of Theology degree. He was a lecturer in Biblical and Religious Studies in the Department of Extra-Mural Studies at the University of London from 1972 to 1994, and Senior Lecturer in the Centre for Extra-Mural Studies at Birkbeck, University of London from 1988 to 1994. He sat in the House of Lords as a Crossbencher but lost his seat in parliament in 1999 after the passing of the House of Lords Act 1999.

== Personal life ==
Lord Combermere was married to Pamela Coulson, a daughter of Reverend Robert Gustavus Coulson. They had three children:

- Hon. Tara Christabel Stapleton-Cotton (born 1961)
- Hon. Sophia Mary Stapleton-Cotton (born 1963); married with children
- Thomas Robert Wellington Stapleton-Cotton, 6th Viscount Combermere (born 1969); married with children, including the heir apparent Laszlo, his older son.

Combermere died in November 2000, aged 71, and was succeeded by his son, Thomas Stapleton-Cotton, 6th Viscount Combermere.

Peerage of the United Kingdom
| Preceded by Francis Lynch Wellington Stapleton-Cotton | Viscount Combermere; 1969–2000 | Succeeded by Thomas Robert Wellington Stapleton-Cotton |
