= John Agnew (footballer) =

English footballer

Personal information
- Full name: John Terence Agnew
- Date of birth: 27 June 1935
- Place of birth: Stockton-on-Tees, England
- Date of death: 2002 (aged 66–67)
- Position: Outside left

Senior career*
Years	Team	Apps	(Gls)
1953–1954	Sheffield Wednesday	0	(0)
1954–1956	Darlington	25	(4)
1957–19??	Corby Town		
- * Club domestic league appearances and goals

John Terence Agnew (27 June 1935 – 2002), also known as Terry Agnew, was an English footballer who made 25 appearances in the Football League playing at outside left for Darlington.

Agnew was born in Stockton, County Durham, He was previously on the books of Sheffield Wednesday without representing them in the League, and made his Darlington debut as a 19-year-old in September 1954 while still a part-time player. After 25 league appearances over two seasons, he joined Midland League club Corby Town in 1956.

Outside football, Agnew completed a doctorate in engineering. His son from his third marriage, Alex Agnew, is a Belgian stand-up comedian.
