= Rothesay Herald =

- The heraldic badge of Rothesay Herald of Arms
- Heraldic tradition: Gallo-British
- Jurisdiction: Scotland
- Governing body: Court of the Lord Lyon

Rothesay Herald of Arms in Ordinary is a current Scottish herald of arms in Ordinary of the Court of the Lord Lyon.

The office was created after 1398 when the dukedom of Rothesay was conferred on David, eldest son of King Robert III, on 28 April 1398. This was the first ducal creation ever granted in Scotland.

The badge of office is Two fleurs-de-lys Gules surmounted of a three point label chequy Azure and Argent and ensigned of the Crown of Scotland Proper.

The office is currently held by George Way of Plean, Baron of Plean.

== Holders of the office ==
| Arms | Name | Date of appointment | Ref |
|---|---|---|---|
| | ... (was Carrick Pursuivant) | 1479 | |
| | ... Banelee | 1507 | |
| | Robert Hart | 1533 | |
| | Sir David Lindsay of Rathillet | 1557 | |
| | John Forman | 1568 | |
| | Florens Douglas | 1574 | |
| | James Borthwick | 1597 | |
| | William Craig | 1607 | |
| | John Spence of Wormiston | 1633 | |
| | James Ewing | 1661 | |
| | Hierome Spence of Brunstane | 1667 | |
| | William Glover | 1633 | |
| | Walter Melville | 1697 | |
| | David Erskine | 1718 | |
| | George Glass | 1724 | |
| | John Brodie | 1746 | |
| | George Brodie | 1753 | |
| | William Douglas | 1790 | |
| | Robert Dick | 1804 | |
| | James Lorimer of Kellyfield | 1822 | |
| | Vacant | 1868–1879 | |
| | Sir James William Mitchell, Baronet | 1879–1898 | |
| | Sir Francis James Grant | 1898–1929 | |
| | Sir John Mackintosh Norman MacLeod, Baronet | 1929–1939 | |
| | Lt-Col. Harold Andrew Balvaird Lawson (Office used in Extraordinary from 1981) | 1939–1986 | |
| | Sir Crispin Agnew of Lochnaw, Baronet | 1986–2021 | |
| | Liam Devlin Esq. | 2021–2024 | |
| | George Way of Plean, Baron of Plean | 2024–Present | |

== See also ==
- Officer of Arms
- Herald
- Court of the Lord Lyon
- Heraldry Society of Scotland
