= Sir Andrew Agnew, 7th Baronet =

Scottish politician

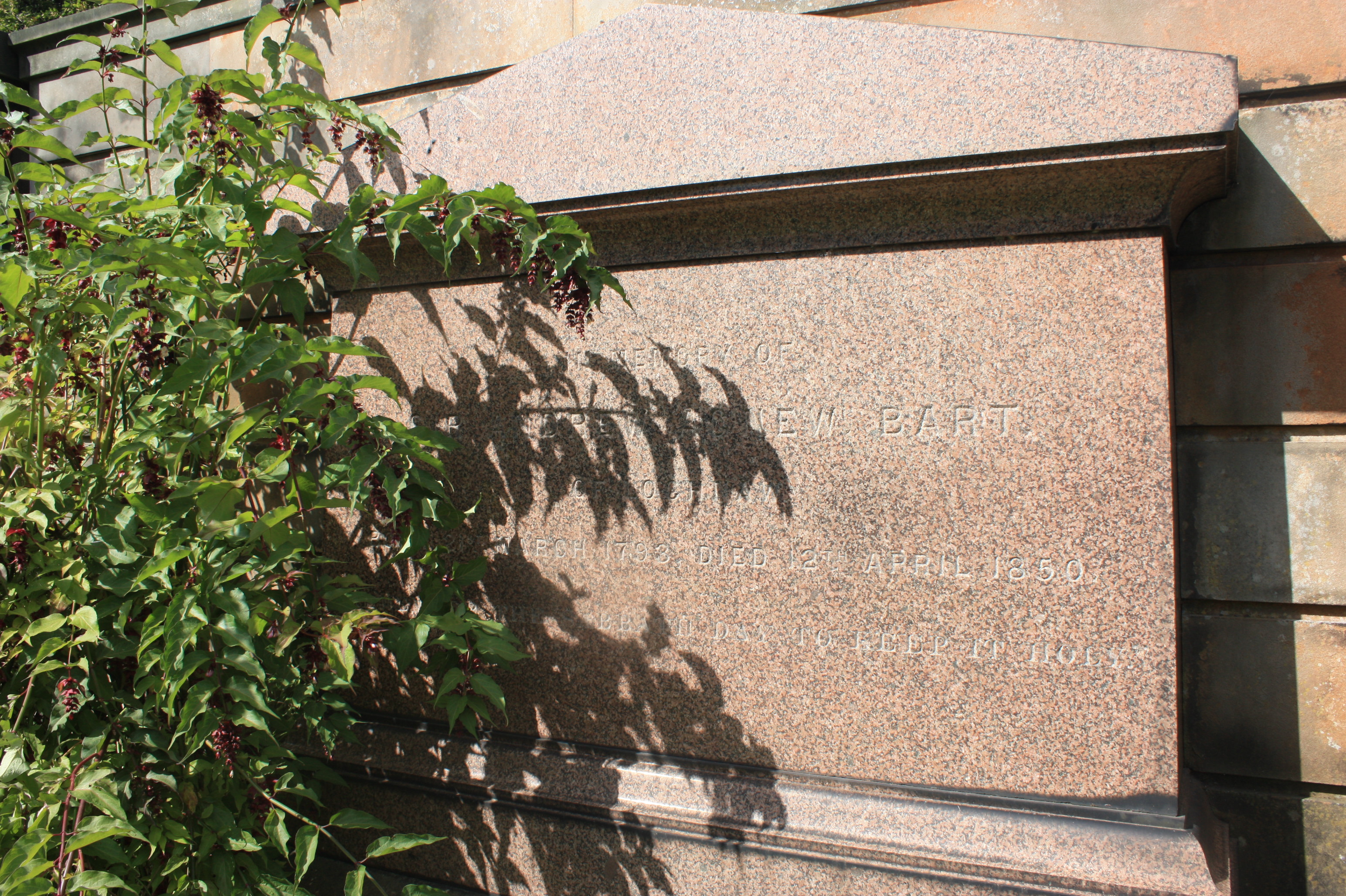
The grave of Sir Andrew Agnew, Grange Cemetery, Edinburgh

Sir Andrew Agnew, 7th Baronet (21 March 1793 – 28 April 1849) was a Scottish politician and a prominent promoter of Sunday Sabbatarianism, which brought him to the notice of Charles Dickens who criticised both his cause and his character.

== Biography ==
Andrew Agnew was the son of Andrew Agnew and Martha, daughter of John de Courcy, 19th Lord Kingsale. He attended the University of Edinburgh and the University of Oxford. He succeeded his grandfather as 7th Baronet Agnew, of Lochnaw on the latter's death on 28 June 1809. The family lived at Lochnaw Castle in the parish of Leswalt.

Agnew was Member of Parliament for Wigtownshire, 1830–1837. He stood as a moderate reformer, but soon became deeply attached to the cause of Sabbatarianism, and pressed for the banning of all secular labour on Sunday. For this purpose he introduced no less than four Sabbath Observance Bills in the Commons, none of which passed. It was the third attempt which drew on him the wrath of Charles Dickens, whose essay Sunday Under Three Heads (1836) is very largely a personal attack on Agnew, whom he described as a fanatic, motivated by resentment of the idea that those poorer than himself might have any pleasure in life. While Dickens made many cogent arguments against the Bill, the strongest perhaps being that people cannot be forced to go to Church on Sunday, his personal attack is probably unjust: the Dictionary of National Biography speaks of Agnew's "genial and kindly nature". He left Parliament in 1837, and no further effort to proceed with a Sabbath Observance Bill was made.

He died from scarlet fever in 1849 and he was succeeded in the baronetcy by his eldest son.

He is buried in Grange Cemetery in Edinburgh against the north wall.

== Family ==
He married Madeline Carnegie, daughter of Sir David Carnegie, 4th Baronet and Agnes Murray Elliot on 11 June 1816, and had issue:

- Agnes Agnew (d. 1893), married Rev. Thomas Blizzard Bell in 1845
- Martha Agnew (d. 1904), married Frederick Lewis Maitland-Heriot in 1848. They are ancestors of actor Charlie Cox.
- Mary Graham Agnew (d. 1885), married James Douglas in 1858
- Sir Andrew Agnew, 8th Baronet(1818–1892)
- Captain John de Courcy Agnew (1819–1916)
- Reverend David Carnegie Andrew Agnew (1821–1887)) He was the minister of the Free Church of Scotland in Wigtown from 1851 to 1875
- James Andrew Agnew (1823–1918)
- Sir Stair Andrew Agnew (1831–1916)
- Thomas Frederick Andrew Agnew (1834–1924)
- Lt.-Col. Gerald Andrew Agnew (1835–1927)

== Notes ==
Parliament of the United Kingdom
Preceded by Sir William Maxwell, Bt	Member of Parliament for Wigtownshire; 1830–1837	Succeeded by James Blair
Baronetage of Nova Scotia
Preceded by Stair Agnew	Baronet (of Lochnaw); 1809–1849	Succeeded by Andrew Agnew
