= Sir Andrew Agnew, 2nd Baronet =

Scottish politician

Sir Andrew Agnew, 2nd Baronet (died 1671) was a Scottish parliamentary shire commissioner for Wigtownshire and Sheriff of Kirkcudbright.

== Succession ==
He was the son of Sir Patrick Agnew, 1st Baronet and Margaret Kennedy.

He succeeded his father as 2nd Baronet Agnew, of Lochnaw on the latter's death in 1661. On his death in 1671 he was succeeded in the baronetcy by his eldest son.

== Career ==
He was shire commissioner for Wigtownshire in the Parliament of Scotland in 1644, 1647, 1665, 1667 and 1669. He was Sheriff of Wigtown and Kirkcudbright during the Interregnum in 1656. He was later fined £6,000 for his support of Oliver Cromwell.

== Family ==
He married Lady Anne Stewart, daughter of Alexander Stewart, 1st Earl of Galloway and Grizel Gordon (1625), and had issue:

- Sir Andrew Agnew, 3rd Baronet (d. c1702)
- William Agnew, 3rd of Wigg
- Grizel Agnew, married Hugh Cathcart (1650)
- Margaret Agnew, married John Maxwell (1656), and later Rev. Walter Laurie

Baronetage of Nova Scotia
Preceded by Patrick Agnew	Baronet (of Lochnaw); 1661–1671	Succeeded by Andrew Agnew
