= Wigtownshire (Parliament of Scotland constituency) =

Constituency of the Old Parliament of Scotland

- Former constituency for the Parliament of Scotland

Former constituency
- Abolished: 1707

Wigtownshire was a constituency represented in the Parliament of Scotland until 1707.

== Shire commissioners ==
- 1621: Robert Maclellan
- 1628–33, 1643, 1644, 1645–47: Sir Patrick Agnew, 1st Baronet
- 1644, 1648–49, 1665 convention, 1667 convention, 1669–72: Sir Andrew Agnew, 2nd Baronet of Lochnaw
- 1661–63: Uchtred McDowall of Freuch
- 1661–63: Richard Murray of Broughton
- 1665 convention, 1681–82: Sir David Dunbar of Baldoune
- 1667 convention, 1669–72: William Maxwell of Monreith
- 1672–74, 1678 convention, 1681–82: Sir James Dalrymple, 1st Baronet
- 1678 convention: Sir Godfrey Macculloch, 2nd Baronet
- 1685, 1689 convention, 1689–1702: Sir Andrew Agnew, 3rd Baronet (died 1702)
- 1685: William Steuart of Castlestuart
- 1689 (convention), 1689–1700: William McDowell of Garthland (died c.1700)
- 1700–02, 1702–07: William Steuart the elder of Castlesteuart
- 1702, 1702–07: John Stewart of Sorbie
