= David Agnew (footballer) =

Northern Ireland footballer

Personal information
- Full name: David George Agnew
- Date of birth: 31 March 1925
- Place of birth: Belfast, Northern Ireland
- Date of death: September 1966 (aged 41)
- Place of death: Sunderland, England
- Position: Goalkeeper

Youth career
- McCue Dicks

Senior career*
Years	Team	Apps	(Gls)
–1950	Crusaders		
1950–1953	Sunderland	1	(0)
- Blyth Spartans

International career
1949	Northern Ireland Amateurs	1	(0)
- * Club domestic league appearances and goals

David George Agnew (31 March 1925 – September 1966) was a Northern Irish footballer who played as a goalkeeper. He made one appearance in the Football League for Sunderland.

== Career statistics ==
Appearances and goals by club, season and competition
Club	Season	League			FA Cup		Total	
Club	Season	Division	Apps	Goals	Apps	Goals	Apps	Goals
Sunderland	1950–51	First Division	1	0	0	0	1	0
Career total			1	0	0	0	1	0
