= Sir Andrew Agnew, 5th Baronet =

5th Baronet

Lieutenant-General Sir Andrew Agnew, 5th Baronet, JP (21 December 1687 – 14 August 1771) was the son of Sir James Agnew, 4th Baronet and Lady Mary Montgomerie. He was also Hereditary Sheriff of Wigton until the office was abolished in 1747.

== Succession ==
He succeeded his father as 5th Baronet, of Lochnaw on the latter's death on 9 March 1735. On his death in 1771 he was succeeded in the baronetcy by his 5th son, Stair.

== Family ==
He married Eleanora Agnew, daughter of Captain Thomas Agnew and Florence Stewart on 12 May 1714, and had issue: he had seventeen children, including:

- Sir Stair Agnew, 6th Baronet (1734–1809)

== Warfare ==
Sir Andrew Agnew of Lochnaw (5th Baronet) was commissioned as a Cornet into the Scots Dragoons on 11 May 1705 and served with them at the battles of Ramillies and Malplaquet. He was promoted Captain in the 2nd Battalion, 10th Foot in 1709 and in 1715 transferred to the 21st Foot (Royal North British Fusiliers, later Royal Scots Fusiliers), which he commanded from 1739-46.

At the Battle of Dettingen, Bavaria, on 27 June 1743, Lieutenant-Colonel Sir Andrew gave to the men of his regiment, the 21st Foot, an order that they "Dinna fire till ye can see the whites of their e'en," from which the saying "Don't fire until you can see the whites of their eyes" is taken. A man of spirit even for the times, he had earlier in the day replied to a brigade order that "the scoundrels will never have the impudence to attack the Scots Fusiliers", but they did. Formed in square, the Scots Fusiliers held a steady fire rolling along their lines and kept off the advancing French infantry. Sir Andrew, a resourceful and experienced officer, had in training practiced a novel battle drill with the men in his square, should they be attacked by cavalry. At last, the opportunity to spring this trap appeared when the square was attacked by enemy cuirassiers. Instead of employing the orthodox tactic of seeing them off by standing firm and taking the charge on muskets and pikes, Sir Andrew gave orders that, as the cavalry approached the front line, the two center companies should divide from the center and fall back from the outer markers. This novel approach allowed the cavalry to charge through a lane with the Fusiliers facing inwards. At this point Sir Andrew gave the command: "Dinna fire till ye can see the whites of their e' en . . . if ye dinna kill them they'll kill you." The French, as they rode through this lane of soldiers, were subjected to a withering crossfire and destroyed. Later in the day King George II, who commanded the Army but was a little out of his depth, rode up and said: "So, Sir Andrew, I hear the cuirassiers rode through your regiment today." "Ou, ay, yer Majestee," was the reply "but they dinna get oot again."

In 1745, the 21st Foot were ordered to Britain to follow Charles Edward Stuart, the young Pretender, north from Derby. Sir Andrew commanded the garrison during the Siege of Blair Castle, which was besieged by Lord George Murray for the last two weeks of March 1746, holding on even when the food ran out and they had to eat their horses. (This was the last time a castle was besieged in Britain). In 1746 he was given the Colonelcy of the 10th Marines, a Regiment in which, his correspondence shows, he took a great interest.

== Post warfare ==
He received £4000 for the abolition of his jurisdiction in the Hereditary Sheriffdom under the Heritable Jurisdictions (Scotland) Act 1746.

Sir Andrew was promoted Major-General in 1756 and to Lieutenant General in 1759. He was appointed Governor of Tynemouth in 1748 at a salary of £300 pa. for life, until his death in 1771.

== Notes ==
Baronetage of Nova Scotia
Preceded by James Agnew	Baronet (of Lochnaw); 1735–1771	Succeeded by Stair Agnew
