= Lochnaw Castle =

Castle in Dumfries and Galloway, Scotland

- Near Stranraer, Dumfries and Galloway, Scotland; UK grid reference NW991628
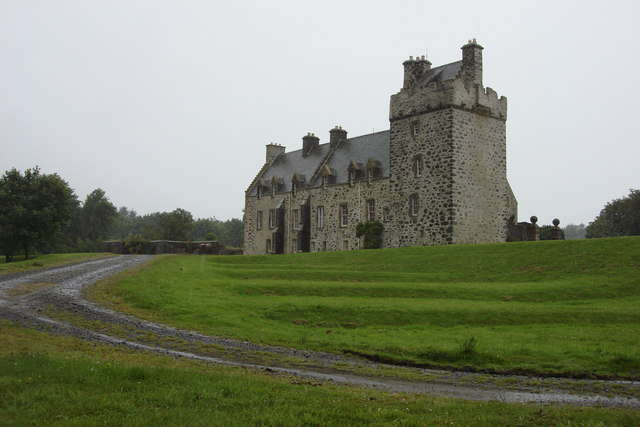
- The tower in 2007

Site information
- Type: Tower house
- Owner: Private
- Open to the public: No
- Condition: Preserved

Location
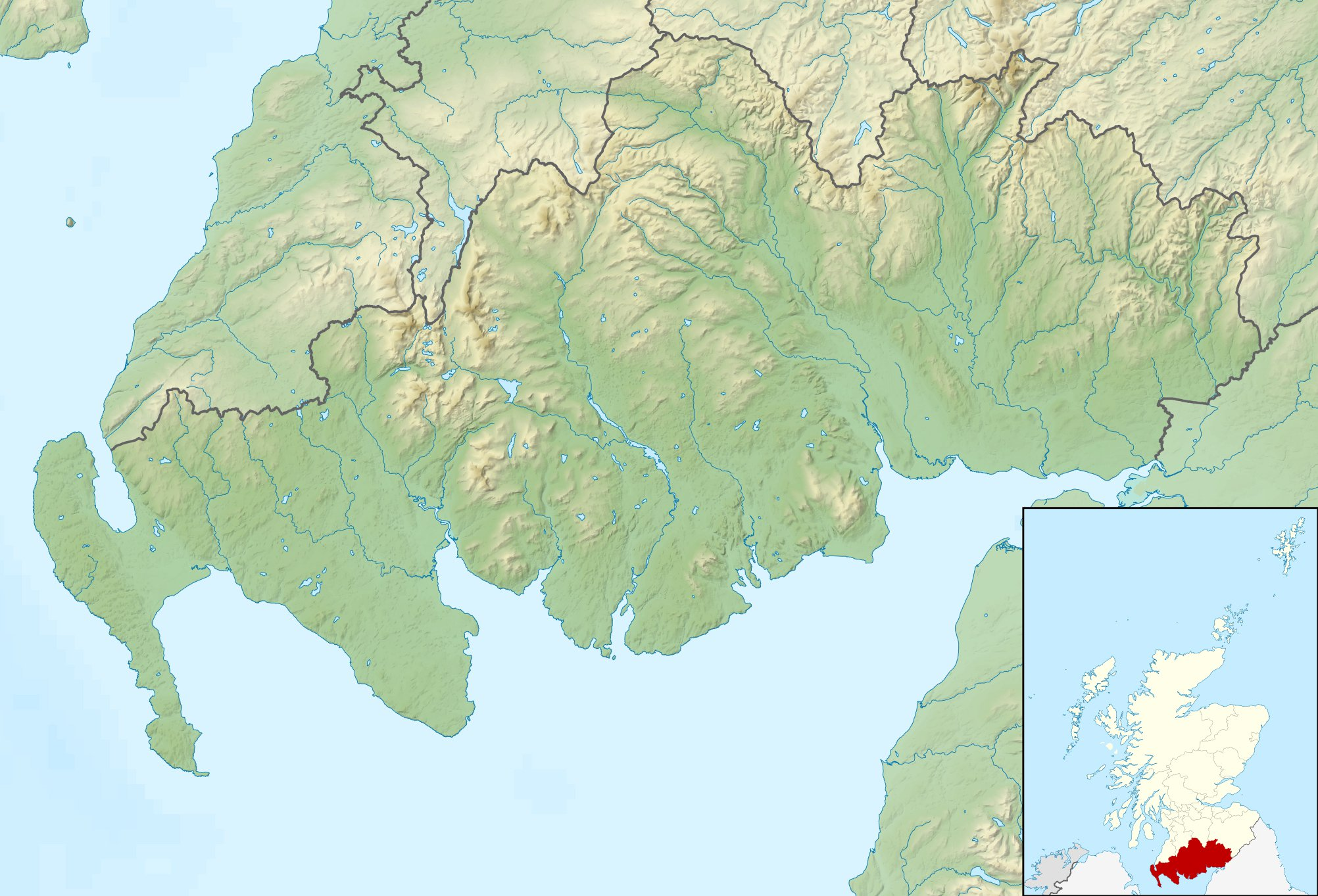
- Shown within Dumfries and Galloway
- Coordinates: 54.919786°N 5.134404°W

Site history
- Built: 16th century; extended in 17th and 18th centuries
- Materials: Stone

Designations

Inventory of Gardens and Designed Landscapes in Scotland
- Official name: Lochnaw Castle
- Designated: 1 April 2019
- Reference no.: GDL00407

Lochnaw Castle is a 16th-century tower house five miles from the town of Stranraer, in the historical county of Wigtownshire, Scotland. The central square tower, five storeys high, formed part of the new castle.

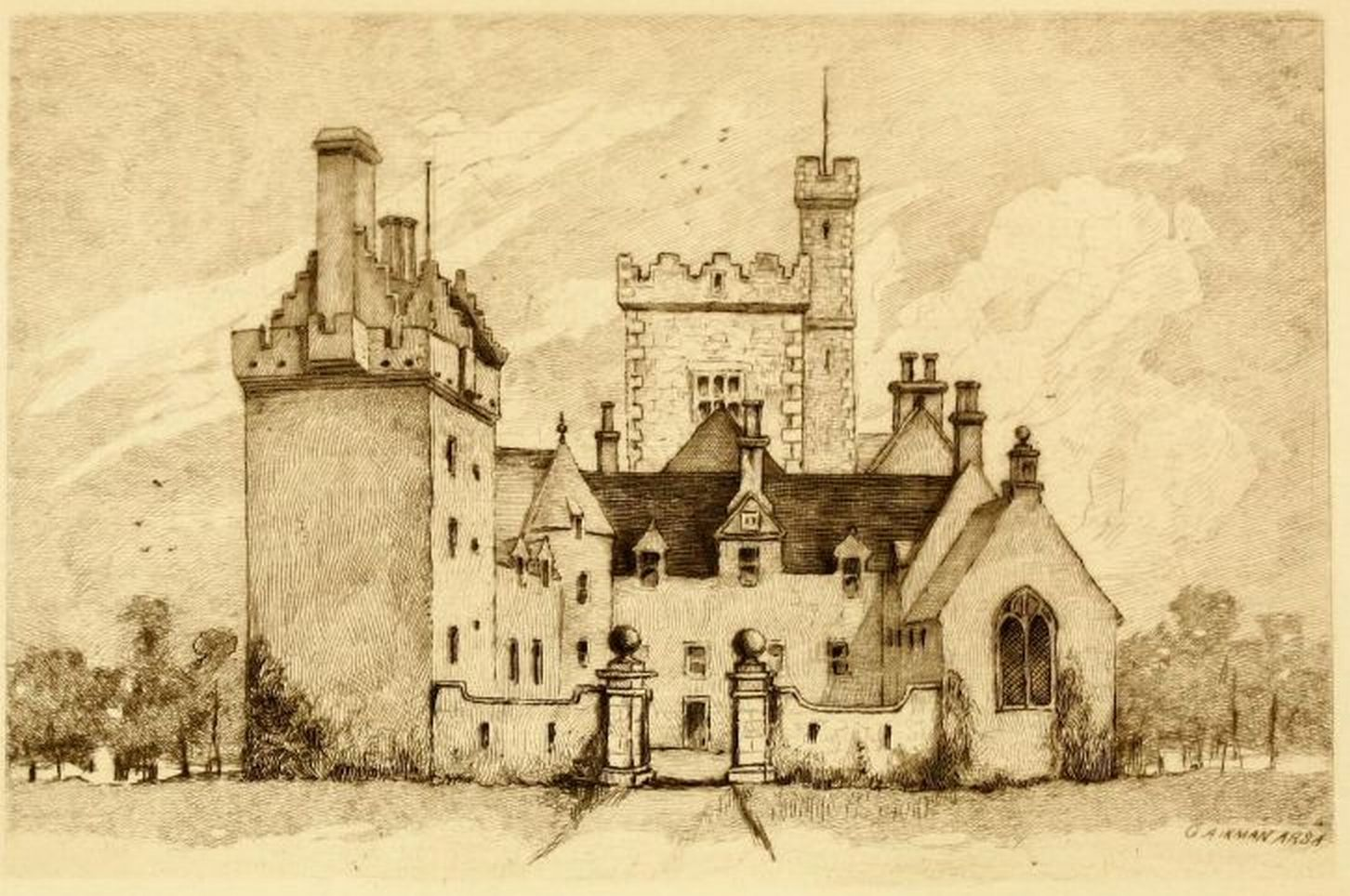
Lochnaw Castle, c.1893

Lochnaw Castle shows four periods of construction – a simple 16th-century keep, 17th- and 18th-century domestic dwellings, and a mansion-house, which was later demolished. There is a plaque bearing the date 1486, on the SE wall of the keep. A chapel, built in 1704, was demolished c. 1953.

An earlier, ruined castle stands on an island in the nearby Lochnaw Loch. A royal castle, this was given to the Agnews in 1363, but was sacked by Archibald The Grim, 3rd Earl of Douglas in 1390, and subsequently dismantled.

The Agnews remained in the new castle until 1948. The castle, located by the loch, is occupied as a private residence.
