= Agnew baronets =

Set index for Agnew baronets

There have been three Agnew baronetcies, one created in the Baronetage of Nova Scotia, and the others in the Baronetage of the United Kingdom. As of 2026} all three are extant.

- Agnew baronets of Lochnaw (1629)
- Agnew baronets of Great Stanhope Street (1895)
- Agnew, later Agnew-Somerville baronets, of Clendry (1957)
