= Thomas Buxton =

Thomas Buxton may refer to:

- Sir Fowell Buxton (Thomas Fowell Buxton, 1786–1845), MP and social reformer
- Sir Fowell Buxton, 3rd Baronet (Thomas Fowell Buxton, 1837–1915), Governor of South Australia (1895–1899)
- Sir Thomas Buxton, 4th Baronet (1865–1919), British aristocrat and philanthropist
- Sir Thomas Buxton, 5th Baronet (1889–1945), of the Buxton baronets, High Sheriff of Essex
- Sir Thomas Buxton, 6th Baronet (1925–1996), of the Buxton baronets
- Thomas Buxton (New Zealand politician) (1863–1939), New Zealand MP
- Thomas C. Buxton (1875–1962), American lawyer, physician, writer, inventor, and politician

== See also ==
- Buxton (surname)
