= Rutland County Council elections =

English local government elections

Rutland County Council is the local authority for the unitary authority of Rutland in England. Between 1 April 1974 and 31 March 1997 Rutland was a non-metropolitan district in Leicestershire.

== Summary of recent results ==
Graph of the party split among 27 seats.
Political group	Councillors		
Political group	2015 election	2019 election	2023 election
Conservative	16	15	6
Independent	8	8	7
Liberal Democrats	2	3	11
Green		1	1
Labour			2
Total	26	27	27

== Council elections ==
=== Non-metropolitan district elections ===
- 1973 Rutland District Council election
- 1976 Rutland District Council election
- 1979 Rutland District Council election (New ward boundaries)
- 1983 Rutland District Council election
- 1987 Rutland District Council election
- 1991 Rutland District Council election (District boundary changes took place but the number of seats remained the same)
- 1995 Rutland District Council election

=== Unitary authority elections ===
- 1996 Rutland County Council election
- 1999 Rutland County Council election
- 2003 Rutland County Council election (new ward boundaries increased the number of seats from 20 to 26)
- 2007 Rutland County Council election
- 2011 Rutland County Council election
- 2015 Rutland County Council election
- 2019 Rutland County Council election (new ward boundaries increased the number of seats to 27)
- 2023 Rutland County Council election

== Results maps ==
2003 results map

2007 results map

2011 results map

2015 results map

2019 results map

2023 results map

== By-election results ==
=== 1996–1999 ===
Oakham East By-Election 5 June 1997
Party	Candidate	Votes	%	±%
Liberal Democrats	Peris Steen	477	50.0	+41.9
Independent	Richard Gale	301	31.6	−44.0
Labour	David Neild	176	18.4	+2.4
Majority		176	18.4	
Turnout		954		
Liberal Democrats gain from Independent		Swing		

Barrowden By-Election 30 October 1997
Party	Candidate	Votes	%	±%
Liberal Democrats	Ruth Archer	207	43.4	
Independent	Mike Fisher	100	21.0	
Conservative	Kenneth Bool	94	19.7	
Independent	Trevor Ellis	76	15.9	
Majority		107	22.4	
Turnout		477	43.7	
Liberal Democrats gain from Independent		Swing		

Empingham By-Election 14 May 1998
Party	Candidate	Votes	%	±%
Green	Eileen Ray	188	58.4	+41.2
Liberal Democrats	Dennis Jeffery	134	41.6	+41.6
Majority		54	16.8	
Turnout		322	35.4	
Green gain from Independent		Swing		

=== 1999–2003 ===
Oakham East By-Election 22 March 2001
Party	Candidate	Votes	%	±%
Independent		383	34.4	+3.3
Conservative		369	33.1	+33.1
Liberal Democrats		243	21.8	+6.5
Labour		119	10.7	−1.5
Majority		14	1.3	
Turnout		1,114	31.1	

Casterton By-Election 25 April 2002
Party	Candidate	Votes	%	±%
Independent	Miles Williamson-Noble	unopposed		

Uppingham By-Election 25 April 2002
Party	Candidate	Votes	%	±%
Independent	Colin Forsyth	218	42.9	+42.9
Independent	Peter Ind	175	34.4	+34.4
Labour	Carol Shelvey	115	22.6	−22.5
Majority		43	8.5	
Turnout		508	19.0	
Independent gain from Labour		Swing		

Whissendine By-Election 11 July 2002
Party	Candidate	Votes	%	±%
Conservative	Jonathan Baker	234	37.4	+37.4
Labour	Linda Arnold	143	22.8	+22.8
Independent	Kate Tudno-Jones	123	19.6	−34.7
Independent	Brian Montgomery	111	17.7	+17.7
Independent	Peter Saunders	15	2.4	+2.4
Majority		91	14.6	
Turnout		626	42.4	

=== 2003–2007 ===
Cottesmore By-Election 3 July 2003
Party	Candidate	Votes	%	±%
Conservative	Jan Rodger	403	74.1	
Independent	Edward Baines	141	25.9	
Majority		262	48.2	
Turnout		544	25.6	

Oakham South East By-Election 23 December 2004
Party	Candidate	Votes	%	±%
Conservative	Linda Graves	339	64.4	
Liberal Democrats	Malcolm Smith	187	35.6	
Majority		152	28.8	
Turnout		526	27.1	
Conservative hold		Swing		

Ryhall & Casterton By-Election 24 November 2005
Party	Candidate	Votes	%	±%
Conservative	Charlotte Jones	unopposed		
Conservative hold		Swing		

=== 2007–2011 ===
Whissendine By-Election 6 November 2008
Party	Candidate	Votes	%	±%
Independent	Brian Montgomery	154	41.3	+41.3
Conservative	Jane Reynolds	148	39.7	−60.3
Liberal Democrats	Roy Robinson	71	19.0	+19.0
Majority		6	1.6	
Turnout		373	35.2	
Independent gain from Conservative		Swing		

Cottesmore By-Election 21 May 2009
Party	Candidate	Votes	%	±%
Conservative	Susie Iannantuoni	389	68.1	+1.1
Liberal Democrats	Joanna Burrows	182	31.9	+31.9
Majority		207	36.2	
Turnout		571	26.4	
Conservative hold		Swing		

=== 2011-2015 ===
Ketton by election 27 June 2013
Party	Candidate	Votes	%	±%
Conservative	Gary Conde	330	44.4	+44.4
Independent	Andrew McGilvray	260	35.0	+35.0
UKIP	Liam Powell	130	17.5	+17.5
Independent	Martin Brookes	24	3.2	+3.2
Majority				
Turnout				
Conservative hold		Swing		

Oakham South West 16 October 2014
Party	Candidate	Votes	%	±%
Conservative	Richard Clifton	240	52.2	
Independent	Ben Callaghan	177	38.5	
Liberal Democrats	Richard Swift	43	9.3	
Majority		63		
Turnout			24.82%	
Conservative hold		Swing		

Whissendine 16 October 2014
Party	Candidate	Votes	%	±%
Liberal Democrats	Sam Asplin	192	51.8	
Conservative	Jonathan Baker	179	48.2	
Majority		13		
Turnout			34.67%	
Liberal Democrats gain from Independent		Swing		

=== 2015-2019 ===
Oakham South West: 12 July 2018
Party	Candidate	Votes	%	±%
Independent	Richard Alderman	178 (Note: Alderman was elected by the Returning Officer drawing lots after both he and Joanna Burrows received 177 votes.)		
Liberal Democrats	Joanna Burrows	177		
Conservative	Patsy Clifton	163		
Labour	Chris Brookes	80		
Majority		1		
Turnout		599	33.5	
Independent gain from Conservative		Swing		

=== 2019-2023 ===
Ryhall and Casterton: 12 September 2019
Party	Candidate	Votes	%	±%
Conservative	Richard Coleman	357	56.3	
Liberal Democrats	Beverley Wrigley-Pheasant	156	24.6	
Green	Steve Fay	121	19.1	
Majority		201	31.7	
Turnout		634		
Conservative hold		Swing		

Oakham South: 19 August 2021
Party	Candidate	Votes	%	±%
Liberal Democrats	Paul Browne	886	67.8	+1.1
Conservative	Edward Burton	420	32.2	−1.7
Majority		466	35.6	
Turnout		1,306		
Liberal Democrats gain from Conservative		Swing	▲9.8	

Oakham North West: 4 November 2021
Party	Candidate	Votes	%	±%
Labour	Leah Toseland	293	62.6	N/A
Conservative	Daniel Bottomley	175	37.4	+37.4
Majority		118	25.2	
Turnout		468		
Labour gain from Independent		Swing	N/A	

Ryhall and Casterton: 10 March 2022
Party	Candidate	Votes	%	±%
Green	Rick Wilson	281	51.2	+32.1
Conservative	Richard Foster	268	48.8	−7.5
Majority		13	2.4	
Turnout		549		
Green gain from Conservative		Swing		

Uppingham: 5 May 2022
Party	Candidate	Votes	%	±%
Liberal Democrats	Stephen Lambert	661	53.8	N/A
Independent	Dave Ainslie	327	26.6	N/A
Conservative	Giles Clifton	205	16.6	N/A
Reform	Phil Bourqui	36	2.9	N/A
Majority		334	27.2	
Turnout		1,229	39.4	
Liberal Democrats gain from Green		Swing	▲53.8	

Oakham South: 17 June 2022
Party	Candidate	Votes	%	±%
Liberal Democrats	Ray Payne	Uncontested	N/A	N/A
Turnout		N/A	N/A	N/A
Liberal Democrats gain from Conservative		Swing		

=== 2023-2027 ===
Oakham North East: 21 November 2024
Party	Candidate	Votes	%	±%
Liberal Democrats	Linda Chatfield	244	40.9	
Conservative	Christopher Clark	237	39.7	
Reform	Ben Callaghan	93	15.6	
Labour	Katie Ross	23	3.9	
Majority		7	1.2	
Turnout		597		
Liberal Democrats hold		Swing		

Barleythorpe: 24 July 2025
Party	Candidate	Votes	%	±%
Conservative	Andrew Dinsmore	209	35.9	
Liberal Democrats	Jonathan Nichols	136	23.4	
Reform	Declan McCarthy	123	21.1	
Independent	Andy Burton	114	19.6	
Majority		73	12.5	
Turnout		582		
Conservative gain from Green		Swing		
