= Roden Noel =

English poet

The Honourable Roden Noel
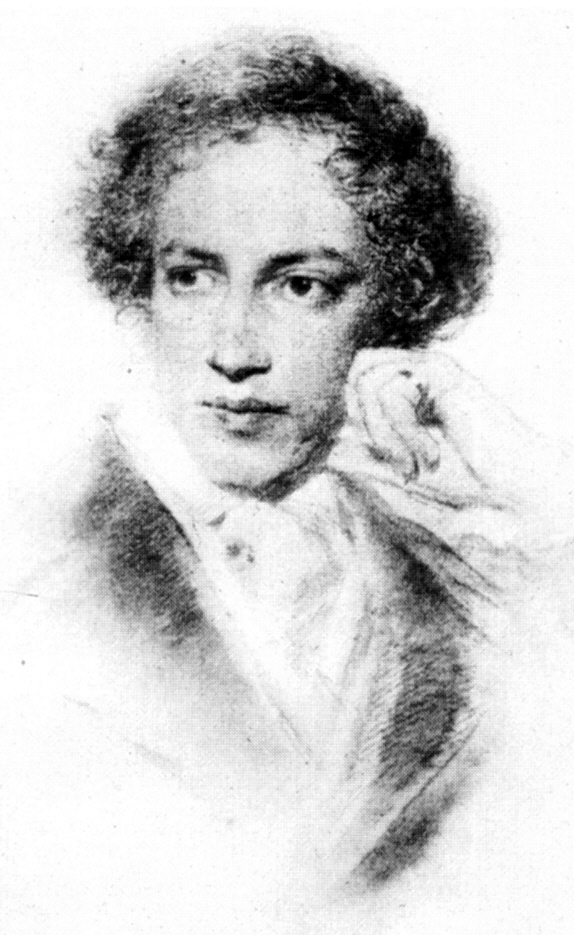
- Portrait of Noel, by George Richmond
- Born: Roden Berkeley Wriothesley Noel; 27 August 1834; England
- Died: 26 May 1894 (aged 59); Mainz, Rheinland-Pfalz, Germany
- Education: Windlesham House School; Harrow School
- Alma mater: Trinity College, Cambridge
- Spouse: Alice de Broë (m. 1863)
- Children: Conrad Noel
- Parent(s): Charles Noel, 1st Earl of Gainsborough; Lady Frances Jocelyn

Roden Berkeley Wriothesley Noel, also known as Noël (27 August 1834 – 26 May 1894), was an English poet. He was a Cambridge Apostle.

== Early life ==
He was the youngest son of Charles Noel, 1st Earl of Gainsborough and, his fourth wife, Lady Frances Jocelyn. His only full sibling was Lady Victoria Noel, who married Sir Fowell Buxton, 3rd Baronet, later Governor of South Australia. From his father's earlier marriages, he had several half-siblings including Charles Noel, 2nd Earl of Gainsborough (who married Lady Ida Harriet Augusta, a daughter of William Hay, 18th Earl of Erroll and Elizabeth FitzClarence, an illegitimate daughter of King William IV), Gerard James Noel, MP, Capt. Henry Lewis Noel, Lady Mary Arabella Louisa Noel (wife of Sir Andrew Agnew, 8th Baronet), and Lady Catherine Hamilton Noel (the first wife of James Carnegie, 9th Earl of Southesk).

His mother was the second daughter of Robert Jocelyn, 3rd Earl of Roden, and the former Maria Catherine Stapleton (a daughter of Thomas Stapleton, 15th Baron Despencer). His paternal grandparents were Sir Gerard Noel, 2nd Baronet and Diana Noel, 2nd Baroness Barham (who succeeded her father as second Baroness Barham in 1823).

Noel was educated at Windlesham House School, Harrow School and Trinity College, Cambridge, where he obtained his M.A. in 1858. He then spent two years travelling in the East. From 1867 to 1871, he served as a Groom of the Privy Chamber.

== Career ==
Roden Noel's versification was unequal and sometimes harsh, but he has a genuine feeling for nature, and the work is permeated by philosophic thought.

His other works include a drama in verse, The House of Ravensburg (1877), an epic on David Livingstone's expedition in Africa, a Life of Byron (1890, Great Writers series), an edition of Edmund Spenser's poems, a selection of Thomas Otway's plays (1888) for the Mermaid series, and critical papers on literature and philosophy.

His Collected Poems were edited (1902) by his sister, Lady Victoria Buxton, with a notice by John Addington Symonds, which had originally appeared in the Academy (January 19, 1899) as a review of The Modern Faust. The selection (1892) in the series of Canterbury Poets has an introduction by Robert Buchanan.

His poem "Sea Slumber Song" was set to music by Sir Edward Elgar as the first song of his song-cycle Sea Pictures.

Noel was a spiritualist and interested in parapsychology. He was a founding vice-president of the Society for Psychical Research.

== Personal life ==
In 1863, he married Alice Maria Caroline de Broë, daughter of Paul de Broë, the director of the Ottoman Bank in Beirut. Their third child, Eric, who died aged five, is commemorated in Roden Noel's best-known book of verse, A Little Child's Monument (1881).

The latter part of his life was spent at Brighton, but he died in the train station of Mainz in Germany. His son Conrad Noel became a Christian Socialist, famous as the "turbulent priest of Thaxted". After his death, his widow Alice married the Rev. David MacAnally in 1895.

== Publications ==
- Behind the Veil, and Other Poems (1863), not included in his collected works
- Beatrice, and Other Poems (1868)
- The Red Flag (1872)
- Livingstone in Africa (1874)
- A Little Child's Monument (1881)
- Songs of the Heights and Deeps (1885)
- A Modern Faust, and Other Poems (1888)
- Poor People's Christmas (1890)
- My Sea, and Other Poems (1896).
