= Gerard Noel (politician) =

British politician

The Right Honourable Gerard Noel PC DL JP
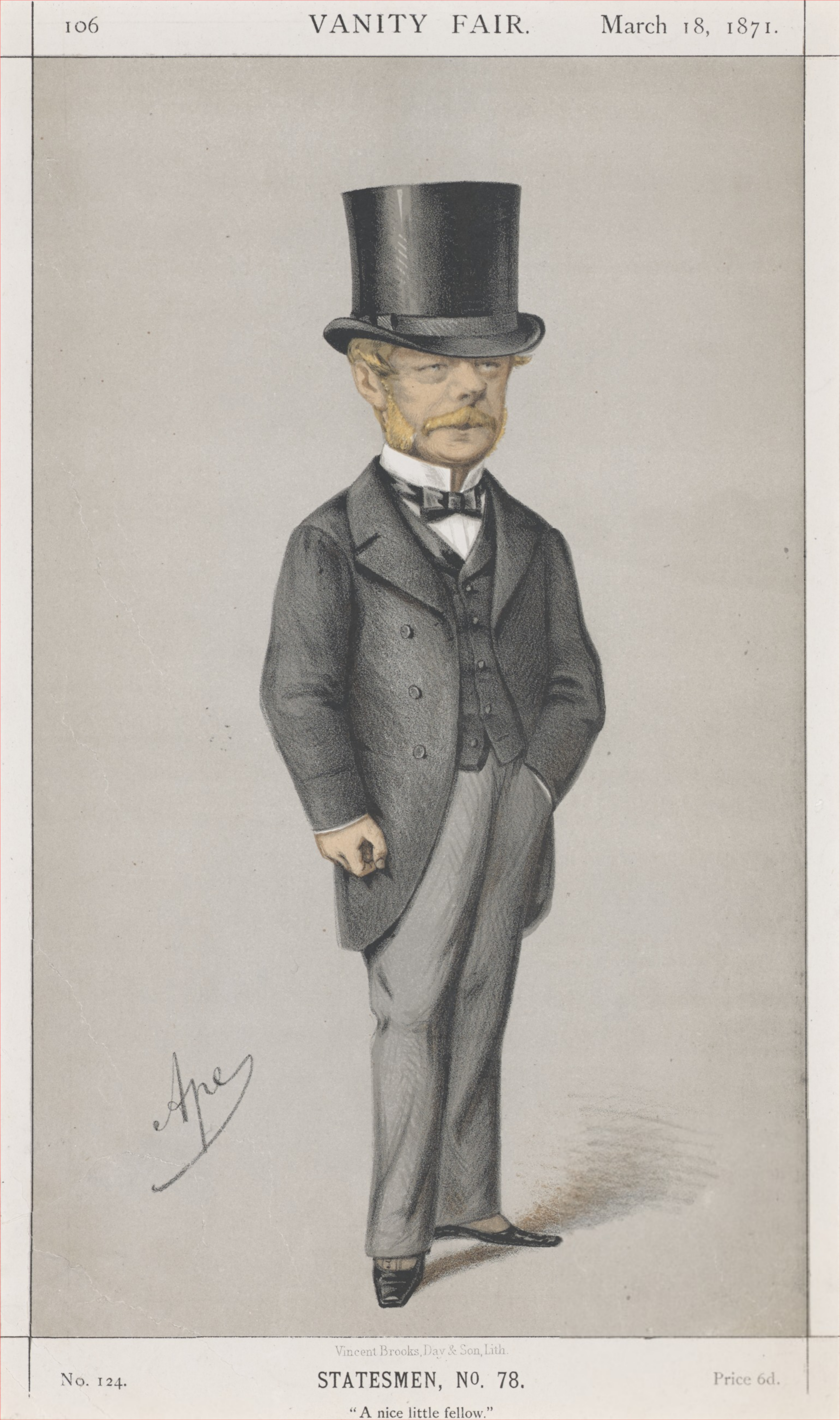

First Commissioner of Works
- In office 14 August 1876 – 21 April 1880
- Monarch: Victoria
- Prime Minister: The Earl of Beaconsfield
- Preceded by: Lord Henry Lennox
- Succeeded by: William Patrick Adam

Member of Parliament for Rutland
- In office 1847–1883 Serving with Sir Gilbert Heathcote, Bt, Gilbert Heathcote, George Finch
- Preceded by: Sir Gilbert Heathcote, Bt; George Finch
- Succeeded by: George Finch; James Lowther

Personal details
- Born: Gerard James Noel; 28 August 1823
- Died: 19 May 1911 (aged 87) Oakham, Rutland
- Party: Conservative
- Spouse: Augusta Lowther (m. 1863)
- Relations: Charles Noel, 2nd Earl of Gainsborough (half-brother); Roden Noel (half-brother); Lady Victoria Buxton (half-sister)
- Children: Gerard Cecil Noel; Henry Cecil Noel
- Parent(s): Charles Noel, 1st Earl of Gainsborough; Arabella Hamlyn-Williams

Gerard James Noel PC, DL, JP (28 August 1823 – 19 May 1911), styled The Honourable Gerard Noel from birth, was a British Conservative politician.

== Early life ==
Noel was the eldest son of Charles Noel, 1st Earl of Gainsborough and, his third wife, Arabella, daughter of Sir James Hamlyn-Williams, 2nd Baronet. From his father's second marriage to Elizabeth Grey (a second daughter of Sir George Grey, 1st Baronet), he had an elder half-brother Charles, who married Lady Ida Harriet Augusta (a daughter of William Hay, 18th Earl of Erroll and Elizabeth FitzClarence, an illegitimate daughter of King William IV) who succeeded their father as the 2nd Earl of Gainsborough. From his parents marriage, he had three siblings, Henry Lewis Noel (who married their cousin Emily Elizabeth Noel), Lady Mary Arabella Louisa Noel (the wife of Sir Andrew Agnew, 8th Baronet), and Lady Catherine Hamilton Noel (the wife of James Carnegie, 9th Earl of Southesk). From his father's fourth marriage in 1833 to Lady Frances Jocelyn (the second daughter of Robert Jocelyn, 3rd Earl of Roden), he had two younger half-siblings: Roden Noel (a Groom of the Privy Chamber) and Lady Victoria Noel (the wife of Sir Fowell Buxton, 3rd Baronet, the Governor of South Australia).

== Career ==
Noel was elected Member of Parliament for Rutland in 1847. He served under Lord Derby and then Benjamin Disraeli as a Lord of the Treasury from 1866 until 1868, and then briefly under Disraeli as Parliamentary Secretary to the Treasury between November 1868 and the fall of the Conservative government in December of the same year.

After the Conservatives returned to power in 1874 he was sworn of the Privy Council. From 1876 until 1880 Noel served under Disraeli (then known as the Earl of Beaconsfield) as First Commissioner of Works. In 1883 he resigned from his seat in parliament through appointment as Steward of the Chiltern Hundreds.

Apart from his political career Noel was also a Captain in the 11th Hussars and a Deputy Lieutenant and Justice of the Peace for Rutland.

== Personal life ==
On 30 June 1863, Noel was married to Lady Augusta Mary, the second daughter of Lady Lucy Eleanor Sherard (eldest daughter of Philip Sherard, 5th Earl of Harborough) and Col. Henry Cecil Lowther of Barleythorpe Hall (the second son of William Lowther, 1st Earl of Lonsdale). She was the also sister of Henry Lowther, 3rd Earl of Lonsdale. At his home, Catmose House, in Oakham, Rutland, he developed a fine garden which employed 15 gardeners. Together, they were the parents of:

- Gerard Cecil Noel (1864–1925), who married his cousin Madeline Edith Clifton, a daughter of Thomas Henry Clifton, MP for North Lancashire (a son of John Talbot Clifton and grandson of Henry Lowther, MP for Westmorland), and Madeline Diana Elizabeth Agnew (a daughter of Sir Andrew Agnew, Bt, MP for Wigtownshire), in 1897.
- Henry Cecil Noel (1868–1931), who married Frances Mary Cockerell, a daughter of Frederick Pepys Cockerell, in 1902. After their divorce in 1926, he married, secondly, Janet Muriel Baird, daughter of William Baird (a son of William Baird MP for Falkirk Burghs) and Caroline Muriel Burn-Callander (a descendant of the 8th Earl of Coventry), in August 1926.

Noel died at Oakham in May 1911, aged 87. Augusta Noel died in January 1916.

Parliament of the United Kingdom
| Preceded by Sir Gilbert Heathcote, Bt; George Finch | Member of Parliament for Rutland; 1847–1883; With: Sir Gilbert Heathcote, Bt 1847–1856< Gilbert Heathcote 1856–1867; George Finch 1867–1883 | Succeeded by George Finch; James Lowther |
Political offices
| Preceded by Thomas Edward Taylor | Parliamentary Secretary to the Treasury; 1868 | Succeeded by George Glyn |
| Preceded by Lord Henry Lennox | First Commissioner of Works; 1876–1880 | Succeeded by William Patrick Adam |
