= Buxton (surname) =

Origin
- Meaning: Brewing stones. Inhabitance of Buxton, Derbyshire or Buxton, Norfolk
- Region of origin: England, Scotland

Other names
- Variant forms: Buckston, Buckstone, Buckton, Buchanan

Buxton is a surname of Anglo-Saxon, or Scottish-Gaelic origin, and may refer to

== A ==
- Adam Buxton (born 1969), British comedian
- Angela Buxton (1934–2020), English tennis player
- Aubrey Buxton, Baron Buxton of Alsa (1918–2009), British soldier, politician, and television executive

== B ==
- Barclay Fowell Buxton (1860–1946), English evangelist
- Bertha Henry Buxton (1844–1881), British novelist and children's author
- Byron Buxton (born 1993), American baseball player
- Dr Bob Buxton, (born 1979), English politician, Co-Leader of the Yorkshire Party

== C ==
- Dr C. Lee Buxton (1904–1969), American gynecologist
- Charles Buxton (1823–1871), British politician
- Charles Roden Buxton (1875–1942), English philanthropist and politician
- Christopher Buxton (martyr) (died 1588), English Roman Catholic priest

== D ==
- Dave Buxton (born 1952), English jazz pianist

== E ==
- Edward Buxton (conservationist) (1840–1924), British conservationist
- Sir Edward Buxton, 2nd Baronet (1812–1858), British Liberal Party politician

== F ==
- Felix Buxton, British musician, member of Basement Jaxx
- Francis Buxton (1847–1911), British barrister and Liberal Party politician
- Frank Buxton (1930–2018), American actor and director
- Frank W. Buxton (1877–1974), American Pulitzer Prize-winning journalist and editor

== G ==
- Glen Buxton (1947–1997), American musician
- Godfrey Buxton (1895–1986), missionary training college founder

== I ==
- Ian Buxton (1938–2010), English footballer and cricketer

== J ==
- Jake Buxton (born 1985), English professional footballer
- Jedediah Buxton (1707–1772), English mental calculator
- Jeff Buxton, American wrestling coach
- Judy Buxton (born 1950), British actress

== L ==
- Lewis Buxton (born 1983), English footballer
- Luther Buxton (1822–1897), American physician and politician

== M ==
- Max Buxton (born 2005), English racing driver
- Mick Buxton (born 1943), English football manager

== N ==
- Nigel Buxton (1924–2015), British travel writer
- Noel Noel-Buxton, 1st Baron Noel-Buxton (1869–1948), British politician, son of Thomas Buxton

== P ==
- Peter Buxton (born 1978), English rugby union footballer

== R ==
- Ralph Buxton (1911–1988), Canadian baseball player
- Richard Buxton (botanist) (1786–1865), British shoemaker and amateur botanist
- Sir Richard Buxton (born 1938), British judge
- Dame Rita Buxton (1896–1982), Australian community worker, activist, racehorse owner, and philanthropist
- Robert Buxton (disambiguation)
- Robin Buxton Potts, Canadian politician
- Ron Buxton (1949–2021), Democratic politician from Pennsylvania
- Ronald Buxton (British politician) (1923–2017), British politician
- Dr Russell Von Lehn Buxton (1908-1991) American doctor, Commodore of the Hampton Yacht Club.

== S ==
- Samuel R. Buxton (1874–1951), mayor of Newport News, Virginia
- Sarah G. Buxton (born 1965), American actress
- Sarah Buxton (singer) (born 1980), American country singer-songwriter
- Searby Buxton (1832–1919), New Zealand politician
- Steve Buxton (footballer, born 1888) (1888–1953), English football left back
- Steve Buxton (footballer, born 1960), English football forward
- Sydney Buxton, 1st Earl Buxton (1853–1934), British politician

== T ==
- Sir Thomas Buxton, 1st Baronet (1786–1845), British brewer, politician, and reformer
- Sir Thomas Buxton, 3rd Baronet (1837–1915), British politician and Governor of South Australia
- Sir Thomas Buxton, 4th Baronet (1865–1919), British MP and social reformer
- Tonia Buxton (born 1968), Greek Cypriot television presenter

== V ==
- Lady Victoria Buxton (1839–1916), British philanthropist

== Buxton surname in Scotland ==
In Scotland the surname, can be anglicised from the Scottish-Gaelic name, Buchanan, a village in Stirlingshire.

== Buxton surname in England ==
In England the surname Buxton, can derive from Buxton, a spa-town in Derbyshire, meaning to brew stones, bow stones, or the beech town, settlement, or enclouse, or from Buxton, a village in Norfolk, meaning bucc, as in deer, then town, settlement, enclouse. Or from Buckton, parishes in Yorkshire, Northumberland, and Herefordshire, meaning bucc, as in deer, then town, settlement, enclosure.

== Distribution ==
As a surname, Buxton is the 730th most common surname in Great Britain, with 13,135 bearers. It is most common in Staffordshire, where it is the 27th most common surname, with 3,377 bearers. Other concentrations include, Norfolk, (169th,1,705), West Yorkshire, (282nd,1,739), Cheshire, (286th,1,715), Hampshire, (333rd,1,799), Lancashire, (462nd,1,821) and Greater London, (620th,1,821). Other notable concentrations include, North Yorkshire including Middlesbrough, Suffolk, Derbyshire, Nottinghamshire, Greater Manchester, Merseyside, including the City of Liverpool, and South Yorkshire, including the City of Sheffield.

== See also ==
- Buxton
- Buxton baronets
- Baron Noel-Buxton
