= Catmose House =

County building in Oakham, Rutland, England

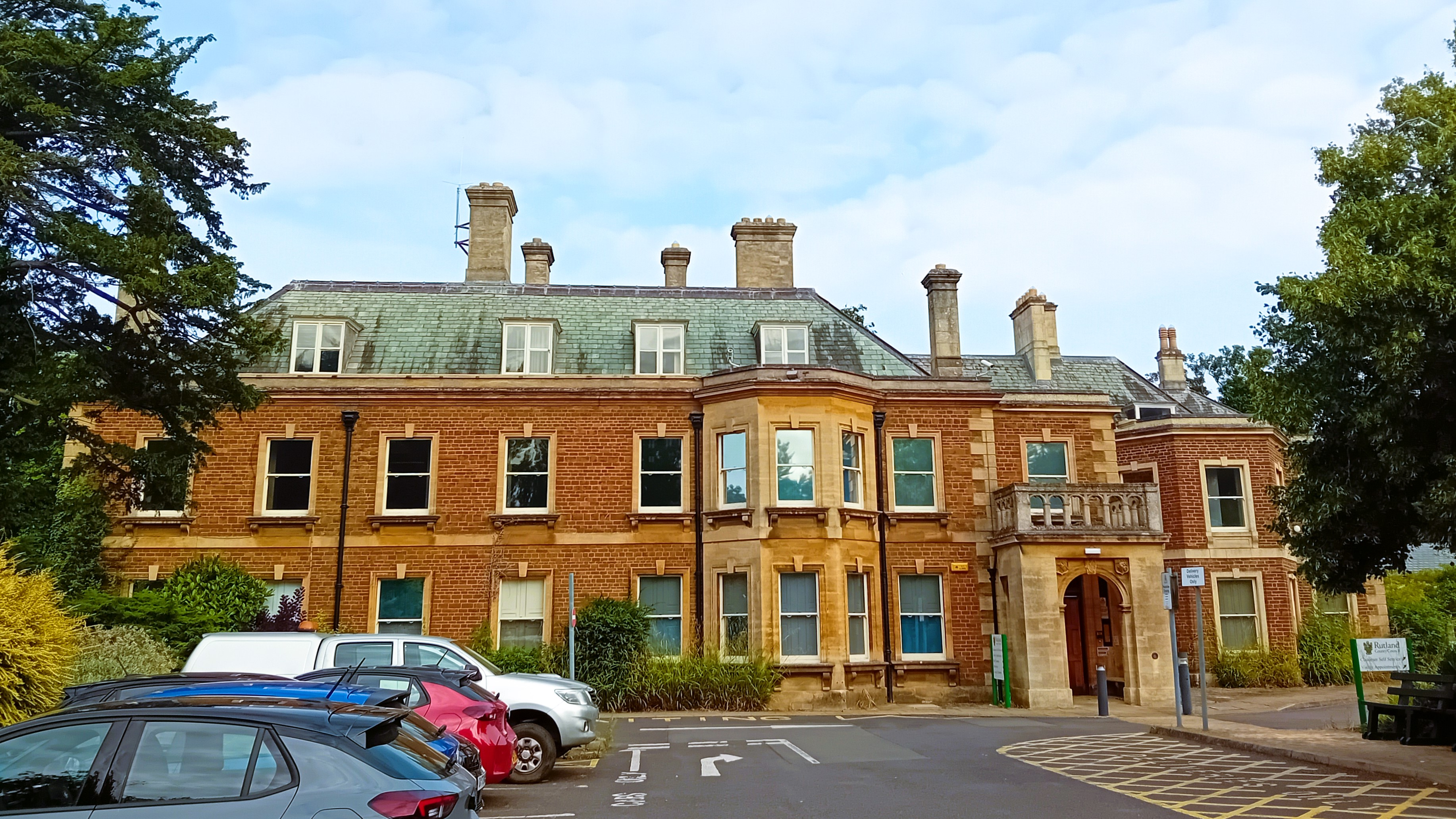

- Location within Rutland
- 52.6683°N 0.7248°W
- Location: Oakham, Rutland

History
- Built: 1781

Listed Building – Grade II
- Designated: 21 December 1994
- Reference no.: 1262074

Catmose House is a municipal facility in Catmose Street in Oakham, Rutland, England. The house, which is the headquarters of Rutland County Council, is a Grade II listed building.

== History ==
The house was designed as a hunting lodge known as Catmose Lodge and was completed in 1781. It became the home of Sir Gerard Noel Edwards, MP for Rutland in the early 19th century. It passed to Edwards' son Charles Noel, 1st Earl of Gainsborough in 1838 and then to Edwards' grandson, Gerard James Noel, also MP for Rutland, in 1866. Gerard Noel substantially rebuilt the house laid out the gardens as well, in the 1870s. (Note: Gerard Noel and his wife, Augusta, were closely involved in the local community and, inter alia, hosted fundraising events for the restoration work at St Peter's Church in Brooke which re-opened following the restoration work, which he supervised, in September 1879.)

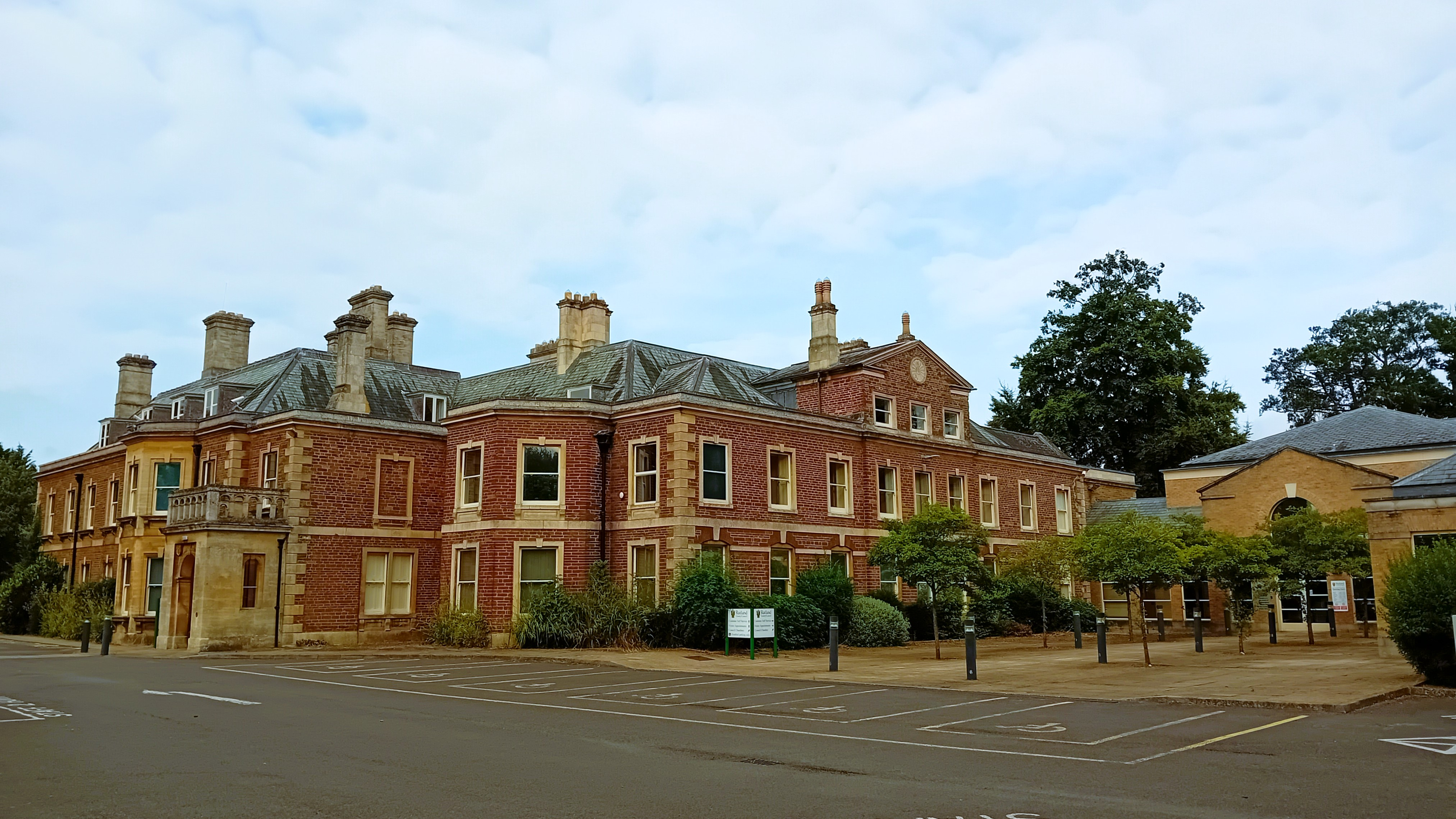
1870s frontage facing south-east to left, original 18th century main elevation facing north-east in the centre, 1990s council office extensions to right

The original main elevation faced north-east and comprised a symmetrical frontage of nine bays; there were round-headed windows on the ground floor and square windows on the first floor with a pediment containing a clock above. As part of the 1870s remodelling, a new main frontage facing south-east was added, including the main door through a stone porch with an arched entrance; there was a balustrade above the porch and a window on the first floor.

In 1936, following a debate, Rutland County Council chose by 18 votes to 6 votes to leave their previous facilities at Oakham Castle and to acquire Catmose House for use as their new headquarters. Changes were made to the property including the installation of a council chamber in a room with a marble fireplace and the conversion of part of the garden into a car park.

After implementation of the Local Government Act 1972, when Rutland was reconstituted as a district of Leicestershire, it became the local district headquarters. Then, following the re-incarnation of Rutland County Council in April 1997, it became the headquarters of the new unitary authority. A large extension was built to the north of the house. When the police station in Station Road was closed, a local police enquiry desk opened in January 2015 in the reception area but this closed in 2020 during the COVID-19 pandemic. The old police station was sold in 2016.

Works of art in the building include a painting by Dorothy Snowdon (1921–2014) depicting an osprey.
