= 2019 Rutland County Council election =

2019 UK local government election

← 2015	2 May 2019	2023 →

All 27 council seats up for election 14 seats needed for a majority

	First party	Second party	Third party
Party	Conservative	Independent	Liberal Democrats
Last election	16	8	2
Seats after	15	8	3
Seat change	▼1	Steady	▲1
	Fourth party
Party	Green
Last election	0
Seats after	1
Seat change	▲1
- Map of the results of the election by ward

The 2019 Rutland County Council election took place on 2 May 2019 to elect members of Rutland County Council in England. This was on the same day as other local elections. New boundaries were used in this election and the number of councillors increased from 26 to 27.

== Results summary ==
Political group
Political group	Seats	+/–
Conservative	15	▼1
Independent	8	Steady
Liberal Democrats	3	▲1
Green	1	▲1
Total	27	▲1

== Results by ward ==
=== Barleythorpe ===
Barleythorpe (2)
Party	Candidate	Votes	%	±%
Independent	Sue Webb	315	66.9	
Independent	Dave Blanksby	305	64.8	
Conservative	Andy Burton	137	29.1	
Turnout		474	30.3	
Independent win (new seat)				
Independent win (new seat)				

=== Braunston & Martinsthorpe ===
Braunston & Martinsthorpe (2)
Party	Candidate	Votes	%	±%
Conservative	Edward Baines	478	54.1	
Conservative	William Cross	441	49.9	
Liberal Democrats	Kenneth Siddle	437	49.5	
Turnout		894	43.3	
Conservative win (new seat)				
Conservative win (new seat)				

=== Cottesmore ===
Cottesmore (2)
Party	Candidate	Votes	%	±%
Conservative	Samantha Harvey	298	54.4	
Liberal Democrats	Abigail MacCartney	277	50.5	
Conservative	Edward Heckels	255	46.5	
Turnout		557	27.8	
Conservative win (new seat)				
Liberal Democrats win (new seat)				

=== Exton ===
Exton
Party	Candidate	Votes	%	±%
Conservative	June Fox	Unopposed		
Turnout				
Conservative win (new seat)				

=== Greetham ===
Greetham
Party	Candidate	Votes	%	±%
Conservative	Nick Begy	Unopposed		
Turnout				
Conservative win (new seat)				

=== Ketton ===
Ketton (2)
Party	Candidate	Votes	%	±%
Conservative	Gordon Brown	554	63.4	
Conservative	Karen Payne	435	49.8	
Liberal Democrats	Mary Canham	258	29.5	
Labour	Eron Rendell	130	14.9	
UKIP	Peter Baker	114	13.0	
Turnout		878	38.9	
Conservative win (new seat)				
Conservative win (new seat)				

=== Langham ===
Langham
Party	Candidate	Votes	%	±%
Conservative	Oliver Hemsley	316	74.4	
Liberal Democrats	John Brookes	109	25.6	
Turnout		427	36.7	
Conservative win (new seat)				

=== Lyddington ===
Lyddington
Party	Candidate	Votes	%	±%
Independent	Andrew Brown	380	70.1	
Conservative	Simon Hitchcock	162	29.9	
Turnout		546	47.5	
Independent win (new seat)				

=== Normanton ===
Normanton (2)
Party	Candidate	Votes	%	±%
Conservative	Kenneth Bool	Unopposed		
Liberal Democrats	Gale Waller	Unopposed		
Turnout				
Conservative win (new seat)				
Liberal Democrats win (new seat)				

=== Oakham North East ===
Oakham North East (2)
Party	Candidate	Votes	%	±%
Conservative	Alan Walters	377	57.4	
Independent	Jeff Dale	347	52.8	
Green	Frank Brett	225	34.2	
Turnout		661	29.7	
Conservative win (new seat)				
Independent win (new seat)				

=== Oakham North West ===
Oakham North West (2)
Party	Candidate	Votes	%	±%
Conservative	Paul Ainsley	Unopposed		
Independent	Adam Lowe	Unopposed		
Turnout				
Conservative win (new seat)				
Independent win (new seat)				

=== Oakham South ===
Oakham South (3)
Party	Candidate	Votes	%	±%
Liberal Democrats	Joanna Burrows	856	66.7	
Conservative	Ian Razzell	620	48.3	
Conservative	Nick Woodley	551	42.9	
Conservative	Peter Jones	435	33.9	
Turnout		1,316	35.4	
Liberal Democrats win (new seat)				
Conservative win (new seat)				
Conservative win (new seat)				

=== Ryhall & Casterton ===
Ryhall & Casterton (2)
Party	Candidate	Votes	%	±%
Independent	Chris Parsons	Unopposed		
Conservative	David Wilby	Unopposed		
Turnout				
Independent win (new seat)				
Conservative win (new seat)				

=== Uppingham ===
Uppingham (3)
Party	Candidate	Votes	%	±%
Conservative	Lucy Stephenson	690	57.2	
Independent	Marc Oxley	627	51.9	
Green	Miranda Jones	624	51.7	
Conservative	Rachel Burkitt	503	41.7	
UKIP	Marietta King	190	15.7	
Turnout		1,222	39.7	
Conservative win (new seat)				
Independent win (new seat)				
Green win (new seat)				

=== Whissendine ===
Whissendine
Party	Candidate	Votes	%	±%
Independent	Rosemary Powell	182	36.9	
Conservative	Giles Clifton	166	33.7	
Liberal Democrats	Kevin Thomas	110	22.3	
Labour	Chris Brookes	35	7.1	
Turnout		497	44.4	
Independent win (new seat)				

== By-elections ==
=== Ryhall & Casterton ===
Ryhall & Casterton: 12 September 2019
Party	Candidate	Votes	%	±%
Conservative	Richard Coleman	357	56.3	
Liberal Democrats	Beverley Wrigley-Pheasant	156	24.6	
Green	Steve Fay	121	19.1	
Majority		201	31.7	
Turnout		634		
Conservative gain from Independent		Swing		

The Ryhall & Casterton by-election arose because the independent candidate Christopher Parsons elected in May 2019 did not meet the deadline to formally accept his position as a councillor.

=== Oakham South ===
Oakham South: 19 August 2021
Party	Candidate	Votes	%	±%
Liberal Democrats	Paul Browne	886	67.8	+1.1
Conservative	Edward Burton	420	32.2	−1.7
Majority		466	35.6	
Turnout		1,306		
Liberal Democrats gain from Conservative		Swing	▲9.8	

The Oakham South by-election was triggered by the resignation of Conservative councillor Nick Woodley.

=== Oakham North West ===
Oakham North West: 4 November 2021
Party	Candidate	Votes	%	±%
Labour	Leah Toseland	293	62.6	N/A
Conservative	Daniel Bottomley	175	37.4	+37.4
Majority		118	25.2	
Turnout		468		
Labour gain from Independent		Swing	N/A	

The Oakham North West by-election was triggered by the resignation of independent councillor Adam Lowe on 8 September 2021.

=== Ryhall & Casterton ===
Ryhall & Casterton: 10 March 2022
Party	Candidate	Votes	%	±%
Green	Rick Wilson	281	51.2	+32.1
Conservative	Richard Foster	268	48.8	−7.5
Majority		13	2.4	
Turnout		549		
Green gain from Conservative		Swing		

The Ryhall & Casterton by-election was triggered by the resignation of Richard Coleman on 5 November 2021. He had been elected as a Conservative in a by-election in September 2019 but left the party to sit as an independent in February 2021.

=== Uppingham ===
Uppingham: 5 May 2022
Party	Candidate	Votes	%	±%
Liberal Democrats	Stephen Lambert	661	53.8	N/A
Independent	Dave Ainslie	327	26.6	N/A
Conservative	Giles Clifton	205	16.6	N/A
Reform	Phil Bourqui	36	2.9	N/A
Majority		334	27.2	
Turnout		1,229	39.4	
Liberal Democrats gain from Green		Swing	▲53.8	

The Uppingham by-election was triggered by the resignation of Green councillor Miranda Jones in March 2022.

=== Oakham South ===
Oakham South: 17 June 2022
Party	Candidate	Votes	%	±%
Liberal Democrats	Raymond Payne	Unopposed		
Liberal Democrats gain from Conservative		Swing	N/A	

The Oakham South vacancy arose due to the resignation of Ian Razzell, who had been elected as a Conservative in 2019 but had subsequently left the party to sit as an independent.
