= Robert Buxton =

Robert Buxton may refer to:

- Robert Buxton (c. 1533 – 1607), English MP
- Sir Robert Buxton, 1st Baronet (1753–1839), English politician
- Sir Robert Buxton, 3rd Baronet (1829–1888), English politician
- Dr Robert (Bob) Buxton, (born 1979), English politician, Co-Leader of the Yorkshire Party
- Robert Hugh Buxton (1871–c. 1965), English artist
- Robert Vere Buxton (1883–1953), English cricketer, soldier, banker

== See also ==
- Robert Bukton (fl.1394-1401), English MP for Suffolk
- Buxton (surname)
