= John Buxton =

John Buxton may refer to:

- John Buxton (politician) (1608–1660), English lawyer and politician
- Sir John Buxton, 2nd Baronet (1788–1842), English politician
- John Buxton (ornithologist) (1912–1989), scholar, university teacher, poet, and ornithologist
- John Buxton (rugby union) (1933–2007), a New Zealand international rugby union representative

== See also ==
- Buxton (surname)
