= Sir Thomas Buxton, 4th Baronet =

British Baronet

Sir Thomas Buxton Bt, JP
- Preceded by: Sir Thomas Buxton, 3rd Baronet
- Succeeded by: Sir Thomas Buxton, 5th Baronet

Personal details
- Born: 8 April 1865
- Died: 31 May 1919 (aged 54)
- Spouse: Anne Louisa Matilda O'Rorke (m. 1888)
- Relations: Sir Edward North Buxton (grandfather); Charles Noel, 1st Earl of Gainsborough (grandfather); Lady Frances Jocelyn (grandmother)
- Children: Seven
- Parent(s): Lady Victoria Noel; Sir Thomas Buxton, 3rd Baronet
- Education: Harrow School
- Alma mater: Trinity College, Cambridge

Sir Thomas Fowell Victor Buxton, 4th Baronet, JP (8 April 1865 – 31 May 1919) was a British aristocrat and philanthropist.

== Early life ==
Victor Buxton, as he was known, was born on 8 April 1865. He was the son of Lady Victoria Noel and Sir Thomas Fowell Buxton of Woodredon Hall, Waltham Abbey, County of Essex. His father served as Governor of South Australia between 1895 and 1899.

The great-grandson of Sir Thomas Fowell Buxton, a Member of Parliament (United Kingdom) and social reformer, his paternal grandparents were Catherine (née Gurney) Buxton (daughter of Samuel Gurney) and Sir Edward North Buxton, also an MP. His maternal grandfather was the Charles Noel, 1st Earl of Gainsborough and Lady Frances Jocelyn (daughter of Robert Jocelyn, 3rd Earl of Roden).

Sir Thomas attended Harrow School and graduated B.A. from Trinity College, Cambridge in 1887.

== Career ==
A director of the family-owned Truman, Hanbury, Buxton Brewery, Sir Thomas was a philanthropist supporting several organizations in the Anglican evangelical wing of the Church of England. He served as Temporary Major in the 2nd Battalion, Essex Volunteer Regiment, was a Justice of the Peace, and in 1905 the High Sheriff of Essex.

Upon the death of his father in 1915, he inherited the baronetcy.

== Kenya ==
Sir Thomas Fowell Victor Buxton opened Buxton High School Mombasa in 1904 having in 1903 bought a 4.5 acre plot on Mombasa Island (additional to the school) and a farm up the coast at Vipingo which still exists. He was one of the earliest English settlers to arrive in Limuru, in 1902. His land, Kubuku Farm, bordered the railway line and consisted of the usual square mile surveyed by Government and sold to intending settlers. He brought Waswahili up from the coast to grow English potatoes in the rich forest land. Sir Victor gave land to be used for a Deacons' school - now the thriving St. Paul's University, Limuru. His son, Clarence, developed the land as a dairy and tea estate.

== Personal life ==
On 10 October 1888, he married Anne Louisa Matilda O'Rorke, daughter of the Rev. Henry Thomas and Lucy Elizabeth O'Rorke, of Norfolk, England. Together, they were the parents of seven children:

- Thomas Fowell Buxton (1889–1945), who served in World War I, became a barrister, and succeeded his father as 5th baronet in 1919.
- Roden Henry Victor Buxton (1890–1990), who served in the Royal Navy in both World Wars, retiring with the rank of Captain and invested as a Commander, Order of the British Empire.
- Clarence Edward Victor Buxton (1892–1967), attended Eton College, where he was an award-winning rower, and Trinity College, Cambridge. He gained the rank of Major during World War I. Settling in Kenya after the war, he served as a Commissioner in the Masai District and in 1937 became Acting Provincial Commissioner. He was seconded to Palestine as Acting District Commissioner in 1938, followed by his retirement from the Colonial Service in March 1940.
- Lucy Victoria Buxton (1893–1978), who married diplomat Charles Henry Bentinck.
- Jocelyn Murray Victor Buxton (1896–1916), attended Marlborough College. He served as a 2nd Lieutenant attached to the Rifle Brigade (The Prince Consort's Own) and died on 1 July 1916, the first day of the Battle of the Somme. He has no known grave and is commemorated on the Thiepval Memorial. Buxton's "A Trench Narrative" was read at the 100th Anniversary of the Somme service at Westminster Abbey on 1 July 2016.
- Maurice Victor Buxton (1898–1919), attended Eton College where he was Captain of the Boats and President of Pop, left Trinity College Cambridge to be commissioned as a Lieutenant in the Coldstream Guards during World War I. He was awarded the Military Cross for conspicuous gallantry in the Battle of Maubeuge in November 1918. Buxton died of pneumonia on 8 August 1919 less than a month after rowing with his brother Charles in the Paris Inter-Allied Games.
- Rupert Erroll Victor Buxton (1900–1921), who drowned near Oxford at the age of 21 with his close friend Michael Llewelyn Davies.

Sir Thomas died on 31 May 1919 at age 54, as a result of a freak accident with his own new motor car. Lady Buxton died 12 January 1956.

=== Descendants ===
Through his second son, he was a grandfather of Sir Jocelyn Charles Roden Buxton (1924–2014), who succeeded as the 7th baronet in 1996.

Baronetage of the United Kingdom
| Preceded by Thomas Buxton | Baronet (of Belfield); 1915–1919 | Succeeded by Thomas Buxton |
