= Diana Noel, 2nd Baroness Barham =

English peer and evangelical patron

Diana Noel
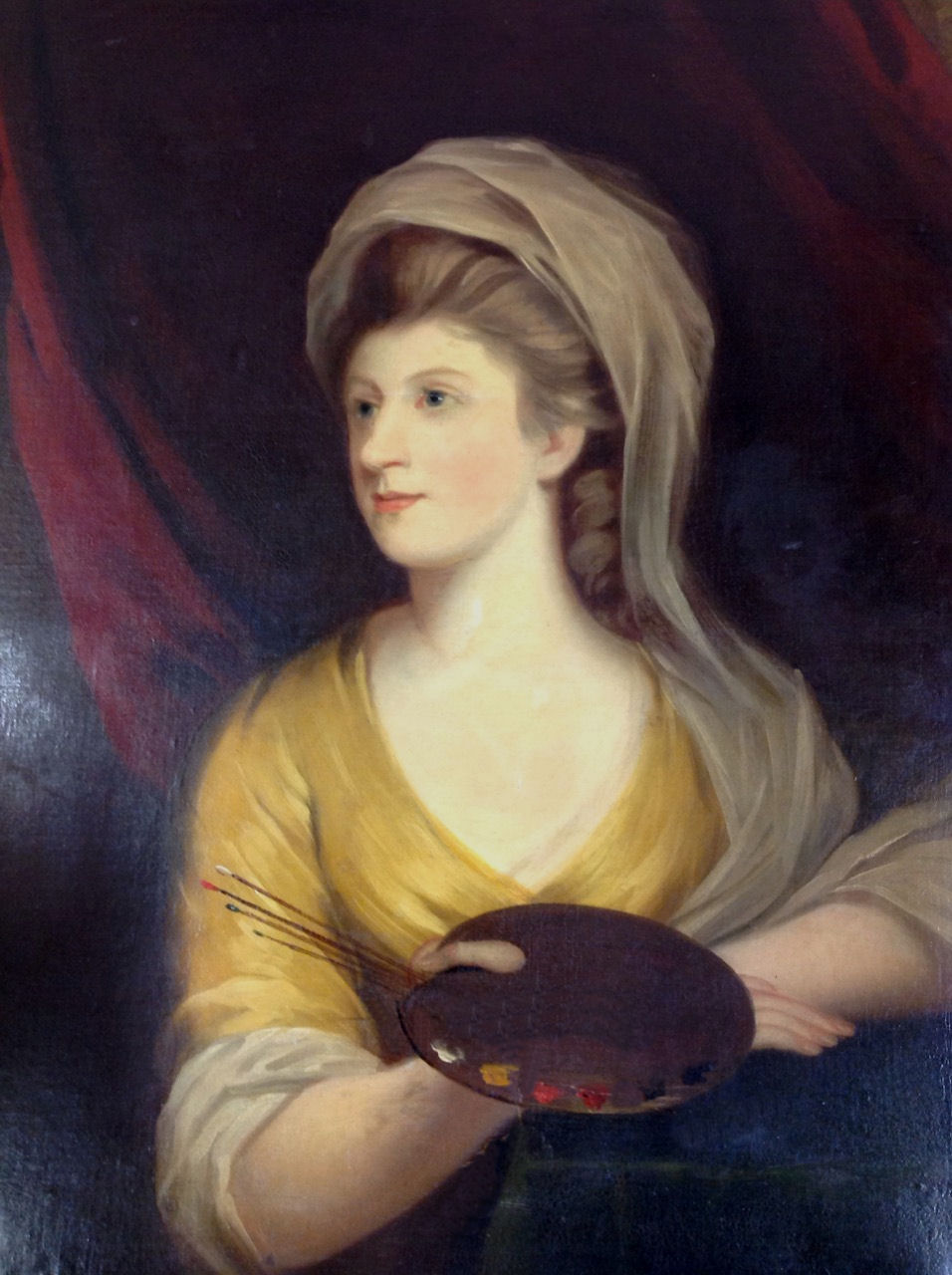

Baroness Barham
- Reign: 17 June 1813-12 April 1823
- Predecessor: Charles Middleton, 1st Baron Barham
- Successor: Charles Noel, 1st Earl of Gainsborough
- Born: Diana Middleton; 18 September 1762; Barham Court, Teston, Kent
- Died: 12 April 1823 (aged 60); Fairy Hill, Gower
- Buried: Teston
- Spouse: Sir Gerard Noel, 2nd Baronet
- Issue: Charles Noel, 1st Earl of Gainsborough
- Father: Charles Middleton
- Mother: Margaret Gambier

Diana Noel, 2nd Baroness Barham (18 September 1762 – 12 April 1823) was a peer, philanthropist and an abolitionist who established schools and churches on the Gower Peninsula.

== Early life ==
Born on 18 September 1762 at Barham Court, Teston in Kent, her parents were Margaret (née Gambier) and Charles Middleton, an admiral who was created Baron Barham, of Barham Court and Teston in the County of Kent in May 1805. They were Calvinist Methodists, whose friends included religious writer and philanthropist Hannah More, cleric George Whitefield, and politician and abolitionist William Wilberforce.

== Marriage ==
She was married on 21 December 1780 to Gerard Edwardes, who was a Cambridge-educated banker and member of Parliament. In 1798, he inherited the estates of his uncle, Henry Noel, 6th Earl of Gainsborough, and changed his surname to Noel. They had eighteen children, one of whom, Baptist Wriothesley Noel, stated that his parents' home "combined whig politics, evangelical devotion, aristocratic unconventionality, and strong-mindedness in a potent blend".

Gerard's estates, worth £20,800 a year and consisting of 15,000 acres, were put into trust due to the poor state of financial management by 1816.

== Baroness Barham ==
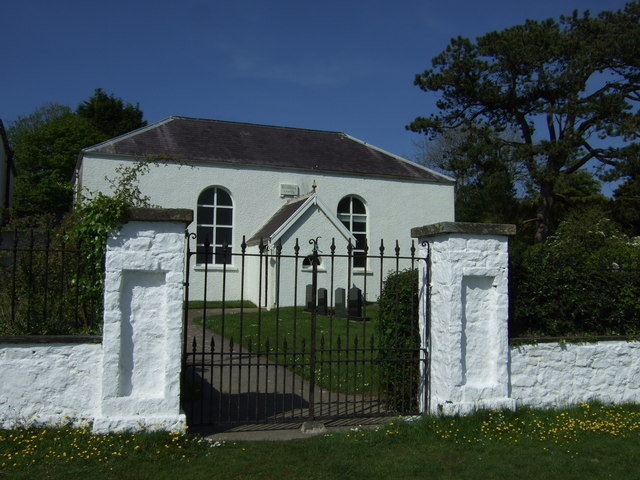
Bethesda Chapel in Burry Green was built in 1813 or 1814 by Diana, Baroness Barham

When her father died in 1813, as the only child, she became 2nd Baroness Barham by a special remainder. That year, having found her husband to be a "profligate and eccentric husband", she moved to Fairy Hill, Gower, and began funding the construction of free schools as well as four Independent and two Calvinist Methodist churches. She was also an abolitionist and was friends with Samuel Johnson.

She died at Fairy Hill on 12 April 1823 and was buried at Teston. Her son Charles became Lord Barham. He had the chapels transferred to trustees. Her correspondence is archived with that of the Noel family at the Record Office of Leicestershire, Leicester and Rutland and photographs related to her life are held at the Chipping Campden History Society.

Peerage of the United Kingdom
Preceded by Charles Middleton	Baroness Barham; 1813-1823	Succeeded by Charles Noel
