= Emilia Frances Noel =

British botanist, author and illustrator (1868–1950)

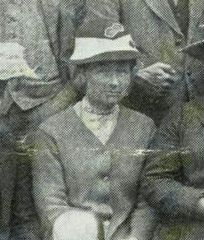
Emily "Emilia" Frances Noel, taken from a group photograph of the British Mycological Society, at the Haslemere Fungus Foray 22–27 September 1913.

Emilia Frances Noel (9 February 1868 – 19 March 1950) was a British botanist, author, and illustrator. She was the youngest daughter of Hon. Henry Lewis Noel and granddaughter of Charles Noel, 1st Earl of Gainsborough. Noel was educated at Somerville College, Oxford. She travelled extensively internationally, and is noted for her writings about and collection of Kashmir plants; her journals are now in the National Archives. She was elected a Fellow of the Linnean Society of London in 1905.

== Life ==
Emilia Frances Noel was born on 9 February 1868 possibly in Rutledge or Kensington. She was the youngest daughter of Hon. Henry Lewis Noel and granddaughter of Charles Noel, 1st Earl of Gainsborough. She was educated at Somerville College, Oxford, and Swanley Horticultural College in Kent.

Noel was a botanist, author, and illustrator. She had won prizes at Swanley for best advanced botany notebook and best diary of garden work. Noel travelled internationally, and is noted for her writings about and collection of Kashmir plants; her field journals are with the Royal Geographical Society, and in the National Archives. She travelled to Egypt in 1892, then India and Kashmir, and in 1938 visited the Canary Islands and West Africa. She later travelled widely in Europe, the Middle East, South Africa, the United States, Australia and New Zealand, and Java and Lombok. Noel was elected a Fellow of the Linnean Society of London in 1905. The same year, she published a book containing a list of Kashmiri plants, and notes on the country. She also published letters and sketches from her family history.

Noel died on 19 March 1950.
