= 2011 Rutland County Council election =

21st century English local county council election

Results of the 2011 Rutland County Council election

The 2011 Rutland County Council election took place on 5 May 2011. The whole of Rutland County Council was up for election.

== Overall election results ==
=== Rutland County Council - summary of overall results ===
Rutland County Council 2011 Election Results
Party	Seats	Gains	Losses	Net gain/loss	Seats %	Votes %	Votes	+/−
Conservative	16				61.5			
Independent	8				30.8			
Liberal Democrats	2				7.7			

== Rutland County Council - results by ward ==
=== Braunston and Belton ===
Braunston and Belton (1 seat)
Party	Candidate	Votes	%
Conservative	William Cross (E)	Elected unopposed	n/a

=== Cottesmore ===
Cottesmore (2 seats)
Party	Candidate	Votes	%
Conservative	David Cecil Hollis (E)	521	45.9
Conservative	Martyn Dietrich Alexander Pocock (E)	354	31.2
Liberal Democrats	Jacqueline Thibault	260	22.9

=== Exton ===
Exton (1 seat)
Party	Candidate	Votes	%
Conservative	Terry King (E)	428	72.0
Liberal Democrats	Malcolm Hugh Smith	166	28.0

=== Greetham ===
Greetham (1 seat)
Party	Candidate	Votes	%
Conservative	Roger Bilton Begy (E)	456	81.1
Independent	Martin John Brookes	106	18.9

=== Ketton ===
Ketton (2 seats)
Party	Candidate	Votes	%
Conservative	Christine Emmett (E)	Elected unopposed	n/a
Conservative	Barrie Roper (E)	Elected unopposed	n/a

=== Langham ===
Langham (1 seat)
Party	Candidate	Votes	%
Independent	Nick Wainwright (E)	287	51.8
Liberal Democrats	Peter William Green	267	48.2

=== Lyddington ===
Lyddington (1 seat)
Party	Candidate	Votes	%
Conservative	James Mark Lammie (E)	Elected unopposed	n/a

=== Martinsthorpe ===
Martinsthorpe (1 seat)
Party	Candidate	Votes	%
Conservative	Edward Baines (E)	Elected unopposed	n/a

=== Normanton ===
Normanton (2 seats)
Party	Candidate	Votes	%
Conservative	Kenneth Alan Bool (E)	695	40.8
Liberal Democrats	Gale Waller (E)	514	30.2
Liberal Democrats	Peter Golden	496	29.1

=== Oakham North East ===
Oakham North East (2 seats)
Party	Candidate	Votes	%
Independent	Alan Stewart Walters (E)	443	31.0
Independent	Jeff Dale (E)	388	27.2
Conservative	Vijay Dighe	361	25.3
Independent	Helen Pender	236	16.5

=== Oakham North West ===
Oakham North West (2 seats)
Party	Candidate	Votes	%
Independent	Richard John Gale (E)	557	41.9
Independent	Mark Woodcock (E)	439	33.0
Independent	Paul Anthony Beech	335	25.2

=== Oakham South East ===
Oakham South East (2 seats)
Party	Candidate	Votes	%
Conservative	Jonathan Robert Munton (E)	602	39.1
Conservative	Gene Plews (E)	489	31.8
Liberal Democrats	Richard Lawrence Swift	449	29.2

=== Oakham South West ===
Oakham South West (2 seats)
Party	Candidate	Votes	%
Conservative	Joanna Katherine Figgis (E)	285	18.3
Independent	David Leslie Richardson (E)	279	17.9
Conservative	Peter William Jones	277	17.8
Independent	Alf Dewis	266	17.1
Liberal Democrats	Joanna Mary Burrows	178	11.5
Independent	Jim Harrison	139	8.9
Liberal Democrats	Cedric Walter Phillips	131	8.4

=== Ryhall and Casterton ===
Ryhall and Casterton (2 seats)
Party	Candidate	Votes	%
Conservative	Charlotte Louise Jones (E)	592	36.4
Conservative	Chris Parsons (E)	524	32.3
Independent	Graham Anthony George Faithfull	509	31.3

=== Uppingham ===
Uppingham (3 seats)
Party	Candidate	Votes	%
Conservative	Lucy Stephenson (E)	645	19.0
Liberal Democrats	Marc Allen Oxley (E)	626	18.4
Independent	Colin Hamish Forsyth (E)	600	17.7
Conservative	Lionel William Cunnington	562	16.5
Independent	Peter David Ind	531	15.6
Liberal Democrats	Trevor Wise	434	12.8

=== Whissendine ===
Whissendine (1 seat)
Party	Candidate	Votes	%
Independent	Brian Andrew Montgomery (E)	335	57.6
Conservative	Allan Dean	247	42.4

== By-elections between May 2011 - May 2015 ==
By-elections are called when a representative councillor resigns or dies, so are unpredictable. A by-election is held to fill a political office that has become vacant between the scheduled elections.

=== Ketton - 27 June 2013 ===
Ketton by election 27 June 2013
Party	Candidate	Votes	%	±%
Conservative	Gary Conde (E)	330	44.4	+44.4
Independent	Andrew McGilvray	260	35.0	+35.0
UKIP	Liam Powell	130	17.5	+17.5
Independent	Martin Brookes	24	3.2	+3.2
Majority				
Turnout				
Conservative hold		Swing		

=== Oakham South West - 16 October 2014 ===
Oakham South West 16 October 2014
Party	Candidate	Votes	%	±%
Conservative	Richard William Clifton (E)	240	52.2	
Independent	Benjamin G. F. Callaghan	177	38.5	
Liberal Democrats	Richard Lawrence Swift	43	9.3	
Majority		63		
Turnout			24.82%	
Conservative hold		Swing		

=== Whissendine - 16 October 2014 ===
Whissendine 16 October 2014
Party	Candidate	Votes	%	±%
Liberal Democrats	Samuel Michael Asplin (E)	192	51.8	
Conservative	Jonathan Ralph Baker	179	48.2	
Majority		13		
Turnout			34.67%	
Liberal Democrats gain from Independent		Swing		
