= Bertha Henry Buxton =

English novelist and children's author

Bertha Henry Buxton (26 July 1842 – 1881) was an English novelist and children's author.

== Early years ==
Bertha Henry Leupold was born in Bremen Germany on 26 July 1842, and when only a girl of eleven years amused herself by writing stories for her schoolfellows at Queen's College, Tufnell Park, London. Both her parents were Germans. Her father, William Leupold (sometimes spelt Leopold), was a London merchant, her mother being Madame Therese Leupold, well known in musical circles, and with them she travelled in America, Germany, and Holland during her fourteenth and fifteenth years.

== Career ==
At eighteen, she married Henry Buxton, a merchant, but still pursued her literary work as an amusement, translating a German operetta into English, and writing a modest one-volume novel, published at her husband's expense, under the title of Percy's Wife. After fifteen years of marriage he became bankrupt and deserted her and her children.

In 1875, she suddenly found herself poverty-stricken, and, becoming entirely dependent on her own exertions, she turned to writing for a living. In 1876 appeared her novel, Jennie of the Prince's, by B. H. B. dealing with theatrical life, which she had studied as a walking lady on the stage at Exeter. The book was a success. She wrote a serial for the World during the following year, bringing out during the same period Won! By the Author of "Jennie of the Prince's", and a story for children entitled Rosabella, published under the name of Auntie Bee. From this period she wrote under her own name, and the following Christmas brought out another child's book, entitled More Dolls, illustrated by Mr. T. D. White, and dedicated to the Princess of Wales.

Shortly afterwards, Buxton met with an accident which rendered work impossible. Somewhat recovering, she produced Fetterless though Bound together (1879); Great Grenfell Gardens (1879); Nell—On and Off the Stage; and From the Wings (1880). The last two novels first appeared in Tinsley's Magazine. Her other books were Many Loves (1880), Little Pops, a nursery romance (1881), and Sceptre and King (1881). In collaboration with blind author William Willhem Fenn, she brought out Oliver Gay, a Rattling Story of Field, Fright, and Fight, in 1880, and a tale called A Noble Name in a volume published by him in 1883.

She died very suddenly from heart disease, at Claremont Villa, 12 St. Mary's Terrace, Kensington, London, on 31 March 1881.
