= Sir Thomas Buxton, 5th Baronet =

English barrister, soldier and landowner

Buxton in 1919.

Sir Thomas Fowell Buxton, 5th Baronet JP DL (8 November 1889 – 28 October 1945), was an English barrister, soldier, and landowner.

== Early life ==
Born in London on 8 November 1889, Buxton was the elder son of Sir Thomas Buxton, 4th Baronet, and Anne Louisa Matilda O'Rorke. He attended Eton College and graduated from Trinity College, Cambridge. He was admitted to the Inner Temple and subsequently called to the bar in 1913, entitling him to practice as a barrister.

== First World War ==
At the beginning of the European War, Buxton was commissioned into the Essex Yeomanry, with the rank of Lieutenant. He later served with the 3rd Essex Regiment, seeing action on the Western Front and being mentioned in dispatches.

== Career ==
Returning to practice as a barrister, in 1918, he was the Liberal Party candidate for Tonbridge, finishing third among the candidates and defeated by the incumbent Herbert Spender-Clay. Buxton succeeded as the 5th Baronet on 31 May 1919, on his father's death. He held the office of Justice of the Peace for Essex, was also a Deputy Lieutenant for the county, and was High Sheriff of Essex in 1928.

On 21 July 1923 at Crawford Priory, Buxton married firstly Dorothy Agnes Cochrane, a daughter of Thomas Cochrane, 1st Baron Cochrane of Cults, and of Lady Gertrude Julia Georgina Boyle, daughter of George Frederick Boyle, 6th Earl of Glasgow. His wife died on 17 September 1927, three weeks after the birth of a daughter. They were the parents of Sir Thomas Fowell Victor Buxton, 6th Bt. (1925–1996) and Montagu Lucy Buxton (1927–2016).

On 10 November 1931, at St George's Hanover Square, Buxton married secondly Eva Katharine Balfour (born 1889), daughter of Brigadier General Edward Balfour, OBE, MC, CVO, 8th of Balbirnie House, and of Isabella Weyman Hooper of Boston, Massachusetts. Eva Balfour's portrait was sketched (black chalk on paper) by John Singer Sargent in 1911. The portrait is in a private collection.

Sir Thomas Buxton died on 28 October 1945, at the age of 55. He was succeeded in the baronetcy by his son. The second Lady Buxton outlived him for many years and died on 2 June 1978.

== Notes ==
Baronetage of the United Kingdom
Preceded by Thomas Buxton	Baronet (of Belfield); 1919–1945	Succeeded by Thomas Buxton
