= Henry Noel, 6th Earl of Gainsborough =

English peer

Henry Noel, 6th Earl of Gainsborough (1743 – 8 April 1798) was an English peer.

He inherited the earldom in 1759, on the death of his brother, Baptist Noel, 5th Earl of Gainsborough. He was the son of Baptist Noel, 4th Earl of Gainsborough.

In 1793 he built St Luke's Church, Kinoulton.

He died without issue and the title became extinct. The heir to his estate was his sister's son Gerard Noel Edwardes, who changed his surname to Noel. His son, Charles Noel Noel, 3rd Baron Barham, was created Earl of Gainsborough in 1841.

Peerage of England
Preceded by Baptist Noel	Earl of Gainsborough; 1759–1798	Extinct
