= Robert Hugh Buxton =

English artist (1871–1965)

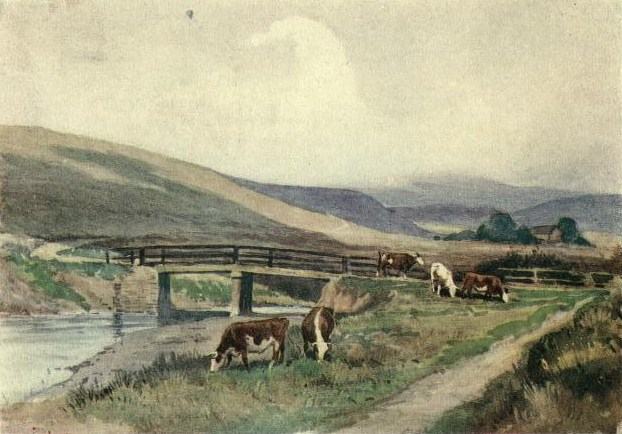
On the Clywedog (from "A book of the Severn", 1920)

Robert Hugh Buxton (1 July 1871 – 28 January 1965) was an English oil and watercolour painter and illustrator.

== Life ==
Buxton was born in Harrow, Middlesex in 1871 and studied at the Herkomer School of Art in Bushey, Hertfordshire, and at the Slade School of Fine Art, London. He lived in London, exhibiting in the capital at the Royal Academy, the Royal Institute of Painters in Water Colours, the Royal Institute of Oil Painters), the New English Art Club and the Fine Art Society. He also exhibited in the regions and at the Paris Salon in France.

Buxton mainly painted landscapes, dogs and hunting scenes. His painting Martin on 'Mulberry' with 'Bill' is in the Bushey Museum and Art Gallery.

He died in 1965 at Yardacre House in Lockeridge, Wiltshire.

== Publications ==
Illustrated books:

- Fisher, Arthur O. Withyford: an Exmoor story (Chatto & Windus, 1908).
- Dawson, A. J. Finn the Wolfhound (London: Grant Richards, 1908);Works by Robert Hugh Buxton at Project Gutenberg
- Bradley, A. G. A book of the Severn (New York: Dodd, Mead & Co., 1920).
