= 2015 Rutland County Council election =

2015 UK local government election

Results of the 2015 Rutland County Council election

The 2015 Rutland County Council election took place on 7 May 2015 to elect members of Rutland County Council in England. This was on the same day as other local elections.

== Results summary ==
Political group
Political group	Seats	+/–
Conservative	16	Steady
Independent	7	▼1
Liberal Democrats	2	Steady
Total	25	▼1

== By electoral areas ==
=== Braunston and Belton ===
Braunston and Belton
Party	Candidate	Votes	%	±%
Conservative	William Cross	Uncontested	N/A	N/A

=== Cottesmore ===
Cottesmore
Party	Candidate	Votes	%	±%
Conservative	Richard Foster	712		
Conservative	Andrew James Stewart	708		
UKIP	Gerry Robinson	492		

=== Exton ===
Exton
Party	Candidate	Votes	%	±%
Conservative	Terry King	449		
Liberal Democrats	Gavin Francis Davies	162		
UKIP	Claire Alison Barks	125		
Independent	Gene Donald Plews	111		

=== Greetham ===
Greetham
Party	Candidate	Votes	%	±%
Conservative	Roger Begy	Uncontested	N/A	N/A

=== Ketton ===
Ketton
Party	Candidate	Votes	%	±%
Conservative	Gary John Conde	1004		
Conservative	Diana MacDuff	791		
Liberal Democrats	Michael Griffiths	482		
UKIP	Marietta King	302		

=== Langham ===
Langham
Party	Candidate	Votes	%	±%
Conservative	Oliver Charles Hemsley	386		
Liberal Democrats	Brenda Gillian Palmer	301		
Independent	Nick Wainwright	113		

=== Lyddington ===
Lyddington
Party	Candidate	Votes	%	±%
Conservative	James Lammie	Uncontested	N/A	N/A

=== Martinsthorpe ===
Martinsthorpe
Party	Candidate	Votes	%	±%
Conservative	Edward Baines	464		
Independent	Theresa Diane Stokes	263		

=== Normanton ===
Normanton
Party	Candidate	Votes	%	±%
Conservative	Kenneth Alan Bool	1020		
Liberal Democrats	Gale Frances Waller	844		
UKIP	Rob Campbell	399		

=== Oakham North East ===
Oakham North East
Party	Candidate	Votes	%	±%
Independent	Jeff Dale	Uncontested	N/A	N/A
Independent	Alan Walters	Uncontested	N/A	N/A

=== Oakham North West ===
Oakham North West
Party	Candidate	Votes	%	±%
Conservative	Alastair Mann	741		
Independent	Richard John Gale	625		
Liberal Democrats	Joanna Burrows	546		
Independent	Mark Roy Woodcock	542		
Independent	Dave Blanksby	440		

=== Oakham South East ===
Oakham South East
Party	Candidate	Votes	%	±%
Independent	Ben Callaghan	573		
Conservative	Tony Mathias	570		
Conservative	John Park	524		
Independent	Michael John Haley	468		
Liberal Democrats	Richard Lawrence Swift	327		

=== Oakham South West ===
Oakham South West
Party	Candidate	Votes	%	±%
Independent	Oliver James Bird	617		
Conservative	Richard William Clifton	583		
Conservative	Christopher Clark	575		
Independent	Graham John Carey	571		

=== Ryhall and Casterton ===
Ryhall and Casterton
Party	Candidate	Votes	%	±%
Conservative	David Wilby	868		
Independent	Chris Parsons	739		
Conservative	Charlotte Vernon	703		

=== Uppingham ===
Uppingham
Party	Candidate	Votes	%	±%
Conservative	Lucy Stephenson	1086		
Conservative	Rachel Burkitt	917		
Independent	Marc Allen Oxley	882		
Labour	Miranda Jones	625		
UKIP	Peter Baker	476		
Labour	Gabrielle Maughan	378		

=== Whissendine ===
Whissendine
Party	Candidate	Votes	%	±%
Liberal Democrats	Sam Asplin	511		
Conservative	Jonny Baker	265		
