= Thomas C. Buxton =

American politician

Thomas C. Buxton (February 18, 1875 – February 14, 1962) was an American lawyer, physician, writer, inventor, and politician.

Buxton was born in Benton County, Arkansas and grew up on a farm. He graduated from Western Illinois University. He studied medicine at Physician College in St. Louis, Missouri. Buxton also studied law at Missouri College of Law and Wesleyan College of Law in Bloomington, Illinois. Buxton practiced medicine and law in Decatur, Illinois. He also wrote novels and poems and was an inventor. Buxton served as coroner for Macon County, Illinois in 1904 and 1908 and as justice of the peace. Buxton served in the Illinois House of Representatives in 191 and 1916 and was a Republican. Buxton died in Los Angeles, California.
