= 2023 Rutland County Council election =

2023 English local election

← 2019	4 May 2023	2027 →

All 27 seats on Rutland County Council 14 seats needed for a majority

	First party	Second party	Third party
Leader	Gale Waller	N/A	Lucy Stephenson
Party	Liberal Democrats	Independent	Conservative
Last election	3	8	15
Seats before	6	13	6
Seats after	11	7	6
Seat change	▲8	▼1	▼9
	Fourth party	Fifth party
Leader	N/A	N/A
Party	Labour	Green
Last election	0	1
Seats before	1	1
Seats after	2	1
Seat change	▲2	Steady
- Map of the results
Leader before election
Lucy Stephenson
Conservative
No overall control
Leader after election
Gale Waller
Liberal Democrat
No overall control

The 2023 Rutland County Council election was held on 4 May 2023 to elect members of Rutland County Council in England. This was on the same day as other local elections across England.

Prior to the election the council was under no overall control, being run by a coalition of the Conservatives and independents. After the election the council remained under no overall control, but the Liberal Democrats became the largest party. They subsequently formed a minority administration with the Green Party councillor.

== Overview ==
There had been several by-elections and changes of allegiance between the last full council election in 2019 and 2023. Immediately before the 2023 election there were four political parties represented on the council and 13 independent councillors who did not belong to a registered political party. Some of the parties and independents formed political groups:

- The "Independent & Green Group", led by Rosemary Powell, comprised five of the independent councillors plus the one Green councillor.
- "Together4Rutland", led by Nick Begy, comprised four of the independent councillors, all of whom had originally been elected as Conservatives.

The other parties formed their own groups, and the remaining four independent councillors (three of whom had originally been elected as Conservatives) were not aligned to any group. The council was led by the Conservatives with support from the Independent & Green Group. The Conservative leader, Lucy Stephenson, was leader of the council, and Independent & Green Group leader, Rosemary Powell, was deputy leader of the council.

After the election the Liberal Democrats were the largest party with 11 seats and formed a new group with the one Green councillor which formed a minority administration. Liberal Democrat & Green group leader Gale Waller was elected leader of the council at the annual meeting on 22 May 2023 by 15 votes to 12 over Independent Rosemary Powell.

== Results summary ==
Political group
Political group	Seats	+/–
Liberal Democrats	11	+8
Independent	7	-1
Conservative	6	-9
Labour	2	+2
Green	1	0
Total	27	0

== Results by ward ==
Rutland County Council election result.

Sitting councillors are marked with an asterisk (*).

=== Barleythorpe ===
Barleythorpe (2 seats)
Party	Candidate	Votes	%	±%
Independent	Tracy Carr	366	68.0	N/A
Green	Hans Zollinger-Ball	280	52.0	N/A
Conservative	Sue Coleman	126	23.4	−5.7
Turnout		539	28.96	
Independent gain from Independent				
Green gain from Independent				

=== Braunston & Martinsthorpe ===
Braunston & Martinsthorpe (2 seats)
Party	Candidate	Votes	%	±%
Liberal Democrats	Andrew Johnson	522	57.0	+7.5
Conservative	Giles Clifton	408	44.5	−5.4
Conservative	Edward Baines*	377	41.2	−12.9
Turnout		918	45.60	
Liberal Democrats gain from Conservative				
Conservative hold				

=== Cottesmore ===
Cottesmore (2 seats)
Party	Candidate	Votes	%	±%
Liberal Democrats	Abigail MacCartney*	331	58.9	+8.4
Independent	Samantha Harvey*	302	53.7	−0.5
Conservative	Graeme Douglas	195	34.7	−11.8
Turnout		568	28.43	
Liberal Democrats hold				
Independent gain from Conservative				

Samantha Harvey had been elected as a Conservative in 2019 but left the party to sit as an independent in May 2022. She was re-elected as an independent in 2023, which is recorded here as an independent gain from the Conservatives to allow comparison with the previous election.

=== Exton ===
Exton
Party	Candidate	Votes	%	±%
Conservative	Kiloran Heckels	225	51.8	+51.8
Independent	June Fox*	209	48.2	+48.2
Majority		16	3.6	N/A
Turnout		444	37.41	
Conservative hold		Swing	N/A	

June Fox had been elected as a Conservative in 2019 but left the party to sit as an independent in the Together4Rutland group in April 2022. She stood as an independent in 2023 but was defeated. The seat is recorded here as Conservative hold to allow comparison with the previous election.

=== Greetham ===
Greetham
Party	Candidate	Votes	%	±%
Independent	Nick Begy*	333	79.3	+79.3
Conservative	Jonathan Collins	87	20.7	+20.7
Majority		246	58.6	N/A
Turnout		424	37.39	
Independent gain from Conservative		Swing	N/A	

Nick Begy had been elected as a Conservative in 2019 but left the party to sit as an independent in the Together4Rutland group in April 2022. He was re-elected as an independent, which is recorded here as an independent gain from the Conservatives to allow comparison with the previous election.

=== Ketton ===
Ketton (2 seats)
Party	Candidate	Votes	%	±%
Conservative	Karen Payne*	391	52.0	+2.2
Conservative	Matthew Farina	387	51.5	−11.9
Liberal Democrats	Mary Canham	346	46.0	+16.5
Turnout		754	33.30	
Conservative hold				
Conservative hold				

The other previous incumbent for this seat, Gordon Brown, had been elected as a Conservative in 2019 but left the party in April 2022 to sit as an independent in the Together4Rutland group. He did not stand for re-election. The seat is recorded as a Conservative hold here to allow comparison with the previous election.

=== Langham ===
Langham
Party	Candidate	Votes	%	±%
Independent	Oliver Hemsley*	218	47.2	−27.2
Conservative	Edward Heckels	163	35.3	−39.1
Liberal Democrats	Andrew Davies	81	17.5	−8.1
Majority		55	11.9	N/A
Turnout		465	40.05	
Independent gain from Conservative		Swing	N/A	

Oliver Hemsley had been elected as a Conservative in 2019 but left the party to sit as an independent in May 2022. He was re-elected as an independent, which is recorded here as an independent gain from the Conservatives to allow comparison with the previous election.

=== Lyddington ===
Lyddington
Party	Candidate	Votes	%	±%
Independent	Andrew Brown*	Unopposed		
Independent hold		Swing		

=== Normanton ===
Normanton (2 seats)
Party	Candidate	Votes	%	±%
Liberal Democrats	Gale Waller*	603	67.9	+67.9
Liberal Democrats	Tim Smith	582	65.5	N/A
Conservative	Jonathan Gibbs	243	27.4	+27.4
Conservative	Ian Coleman	235	26.5	N/A
Turnout		894	37.45	
Liberal Democrats hold				
Liberal Democrats gain from Conservative				

=== Oakham North East ===
Oakham North East (2 seats)
Party	Candidate	Votes	%	±%
Liberal Democrats	Hannah Edwards	497	74.5	N/A
Liberal Democrats	Mark Chatfield	427	64.0	N/A
Conservative	Chris Booth	197	29.5	−27.9
Turnout		671	31.24	
Liberal Democrats gain from Independent				
Liberal Democrats gain from Conservative				

One of the previous incumbents, Alan Walters, had been elected as a Conservative in 2019 but left the party in November 2021 to sit as an independent. He did not stand for re-election in 2023. That seat is recorded here as a Liberal Democrat gain from Conservatives to allow for comparison with the previous election.

=== Oakham North West ===
Oakham North West (2 seats)
Party	Candidate	Votes	%	±%
Labour	Steve McRobb	276	44.4	N/A
Labour	Ramsay Ross	217	34.9	N/A
Conservative	Christopher Clark	166	26.7	+26.7
Independent	Paul Ainsley*	151	24.3	+24.3
Independent	Christopher Nix	139	22.4	N/A
Independent	David Romney	91	14.7	N/A
Turnout		624	24.82	
Labour gain from Conservative				
Labour gain from Independent				

Paul Ainsley had been elected as a Conservative in 2019 but left the party to sit as an independent in 2021, subsequently joining the Together4Rutland group. He stood for re-election as an independent in 2023 but was defeated. The seat is recorded here as a Labour gain from the Conservatives to allow comparison with the previous election. The other Oakham North West seat had been won by Labour in a by-election in 2021.

=== Oakham South ===
Oakham South (3 seats)
Party	Candidate	Votes	%	±%
Liberal Democrats	Diane Ellison	920	68.0	+1.3
Liberal Democrats	Paul Browne*	909	67.2	N/A
Liberal Democrats	Ray Payne*	811	59.9	N/A
Conservative	Michael Rook	363	26.8	−21.5
Independent	Martin Brookes	249	18.4	N/A
Turnout		1,355	36.07	
Liberal Democrats hold				
Liberal Democrats gain from Conservative				
Liberal Democrats gain from Conservative				

At the 2019 election, one of the three Oakham South seats had been won by the Liberal Democrats and two by Conservatives. The Liberal Democrats had gained the other two seats in by-elections in 2021 and 2022.

=== Ryhall & Casterton ===
Ryhall & Casterton (2 seats)
Party	Candidate	Votes	%	±%
Conservative	David Wilby*	345	52.6	+52.6
Independent	Kevin Corby	334	50.9	N/A
Liberal Democrats	Darnley Rayside	202	30.8	N/A
Conservative	Lee Bushby	200	30.5	N/A
Turnout		657	29.08	
Conservative hold				
Independent gain from Independent				

The independent elected in May 2019 did not meet the deadline to formally accept his position as a councillor; a Conservative won the by-election in September 2019. A Green won a second by-election in March 2022 but did not contest the seat in 2023.

=== Uppingham ===
Uppingham (3 seats)
Party	Candidate	Votes	%	±%
Liberal Democrats	Stephen Lambert*	904	75.9	N/A
Liberal Democrats	Christine Wise	780	65.5	N/A
Conservative	Lucy Stephenson*	579	48.6	−8.6
Conservative	Mo Cerrone	236	19.8	−21.9
Turnout		1,199	38.40	
Liberal Democrats gain from Green				
Liberal Democrats gain from Independent				
Conservative hold				

Stephen Lambert had won a by-election in May 2022.

=== Whissendine ===
Whissendine
Party	Candidate	Votes	%	±%
Independent	Rosemary Powell*	Unopposed		
Independent hold		Swing		

== Changes 2023-2027 ==
=== By-elections ===
==== Oakham North East ====
The election was triggered after the death of Cllr Hannah Edwards.

Oakham North East by-election: 21 November 2024
Party	Candidate	Votes	%	±%
Liberal Democrats	Linda Chatfield	244	40.9	–30.7
Conservative	Christopher Clark	237	39.7	+11.3
Reform	Ben Callaghan	93	15.6	N/A
Labour	Katie Ross	23	3.9	N/A
Majority		7	1.2	N/A
Turnout		597	27.0	–4.2
Liberal Democrats hold		Swing	▼21.0	

==== Barleythorpe ====
Barleythorpe by-election: 24 July 2025
Party	Candidate	Votes	%	±%
Conservative	Andrew Dinsmore	209	35.9	+19.6
Liberal Democrats	Jonathan Nichols	136	23.4	N/A
Reform	Declan McCarthy	123	21.1	N/A
Independent	Andy Burton	114	19.6	N/A
Majority		73	12.5	N/A
Turnout		582	29.3	+0.3
Conservative gain from Green				
