= Charles Noel, 1st Earl of Gainsborough =

British peer and Whig politician

The Right Honourable The Earl of Gainsborough
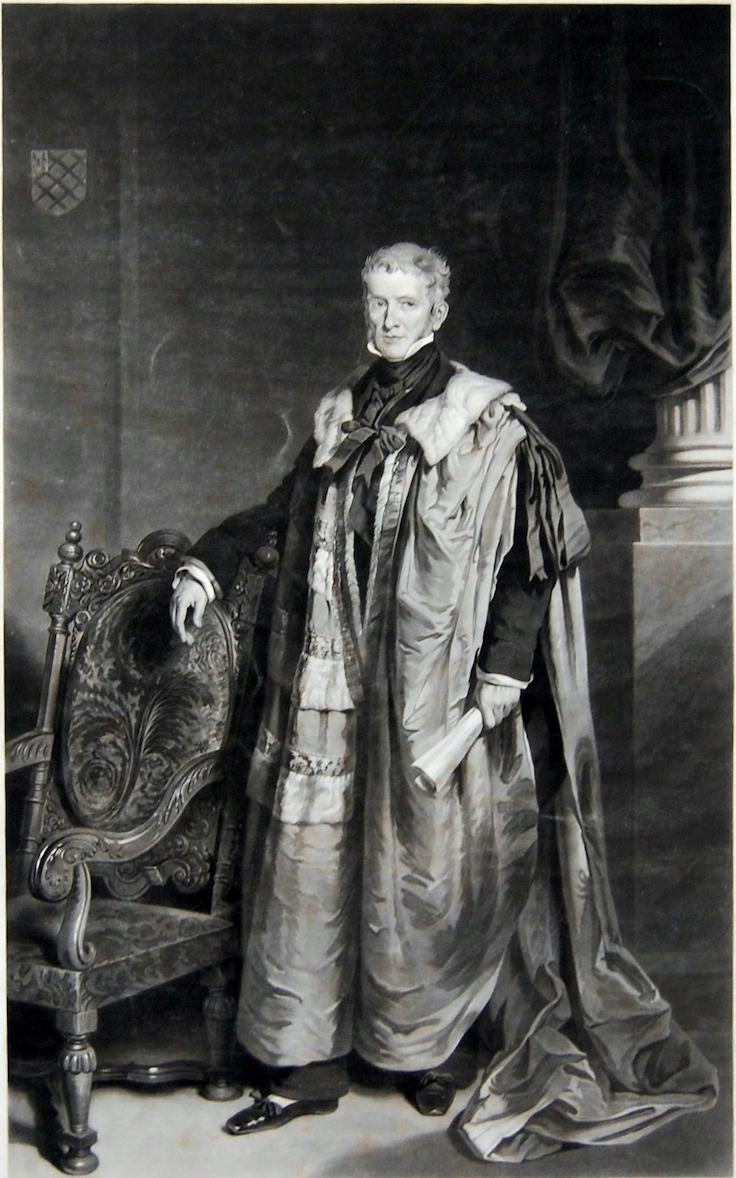

Member of Parliament for Rutland
- In office 1808–1814
- Preceded by: Gerald Noel; The Lord Henniker
- Succeeded by: Gerald Noel; Sir Gilbert Heathcote

Personal details
- Born: Charles Edwardes; 2 October 1781
- Died: 10 June 1866 (aged 84)
- Spouses: Elizabeth Welman (m. 1809; died 1811) Elizabeth Grey (m. 1817; died 1818) Arabella Hamlyn-Williams (m. 1820; died 1829) Lady Frances Jocelyn (m. 1833)
- Children: 8, including Charles, Gerard, Roden, Victoria
- Parents: Sir Gerard Noel, 2nd Baronet; Diana Noel, 2nd Baroness Barham
- Relatives: Emilia Frances Noel (granddaughter)
- Occupation: Aristocrat, politician

Charles Noel Noel, 1st Earl of Gainsborough (2 October 1781 – 10 June 1866), known as Charles Edwardes until 1798, as Charles Noel between 1798 and 1823 and as the Lord Barham between 1823 and 1841, was a British peer and Whig politician.

== Early life ==
Gainsborough was born on 2 October 1781 as Charles Edwardes. He was the eldest son of Sir Gerard Noel, 2nd Baronet and Diana Middleton. His father succeeded his father-in-law as second Baronet of the Navy in 1838 and his mother succeeded her father as second Baroness Barham in 1823, both according to special remainders in the letters patent. In 1798, on the death of his great uncle Henry Noel, 6th Earl of Gainsborough (on whose death the earldom became extinct), Gainsborough and the rest of the family assumed, by Royal licence, the surname of Noel in lieu of his patronymic.

His paternal grandparents were the former Lady Jane Noel (a daughter of Baptist Noel, 4th Earl of Gainsborough) and Gerard Anne Edwardes, an illegitimate son of Lord Anne Hamilton (the younger son of James Hamilton, 4th Duke of Hamilton). His maternal grandfather was Admiral Charles Middleton, 1st Baron Barham.

== Career ==
Gainsborough succeeded his father as Member of Parliament for Rutland in 1808, a seat he held until 1814. In 1823, he succeeded his mother as the 3rd Baron Barham in the Peerage of the United Kingdom and entered the House of Lords. In 1838, he also succeeded his father as the 3rd Noel baronet, of the Navy the Baronetage of Great Britain.

In 1841, he was he was created Baron Noel, of Ridlington in the County of Rutland, Viscount Campden, of Campden in the County of Gloucester, and Earl of Gainsborough, in the County of Lincoln, all in the Peerage of the United Kingdom, a revival of the title held by his ancestors. The family seat is Exton Hall, near Exton, Rutland.

== Personal life ==
Lord Gainsborough was four times married. His first marriage was in July 1809 to Elizabeth Welman (1786–1811), the only child of Thomas Welman of Poundisford Park in Somerset and Elizabeth Locke (a daughter of John Locke of Howley). She died on 1 December 1811. There were no children from this marriage.

Lord Gainsborough married, secondly, on 13 May 1817 to Elizabeth Grey (1800–1818), second daughter of Sir George Grey, 1st Baronet of Falloden (the third son of Charles Grey, 1st Earl Grey) and Mary Whitbread (a daughter of Samuel Whitbread of Cardington and Southill and the former Lady Mary Cornwallis, third daughter of Charles Cornwallis, 1st Earl Cornwallis). Before her death on 20 September 1818, they were the parents of one child:

- Charles George Noel, 2nd Earl of Gainsborough (1818–1881), who married Lady Ida Harriet Augusta, a daughter of William Hay, 18th Earl of Erroll and Elizabeth FitzClarence (an illegitimate, recognized, daughter of King William IV).

His third marriage was on 29 July 1820 to Arabella Hamlyn-Williams (died 1829), second daughter of Sir James Hamlyn-Williams, 2nd Baronet of Clovelly Court and the former Diana Anne Whitaker (a daughter of Abraham Whitaker). Before her death on 4 October 1829, shortly after the birth of her youngest child, they were the parents of two sons and two daughters:

- Gerard James Noel (1823–1911), a Member of Parliament for Rutland from 1847 to 1883, a Lord of the Treasury from 1866 to 1868, Parliamentary Secretary to the Treasury in 1868, and Chief Commissioner of Works and Public Buildings from 1876 to 1880; who in 1863 married Lady Augusta Mary Lowther (died 1916), sister of Henry Lowther, 3rd Earl of Lonsdale, and second daughter of Col. Henry Cecil Lowther MP (second son of William Lowther, 1st Earl of Lonsdale) and Lady Lucy Eleanor Sherard (eldest daughter of Philip Sherard, 5th Earl of Harborough).
- Henry Lewis Noel (1824–1898), Captain-Commandant of the Rutland Light Infantry Militia, who married his cousin Emily Elizabeth Noel, second daughter of Baptist Wriothesley Noel (eighth son of Sir Gerald Noel, 2nd Baronet and Diana Barham, suo jure Baroness Barham) and Jane Baillie (eldest daughter of Peter Baillie), in 1852. After her death in October 1890, he remarried to Anne Adelaide Burnside (died 1904), the only child of Rev. John Burnside, Rector of Plumtree, in 1892.
- Lady Mary Arabella Louisa Noel (died 1883), who married Sir Andrew Agnew, 8th Baronet of Lochnaw, in 1846.
- Lady Catherine Hamilton Noel (1829–1855), who married, as his first wife, James Carnegie, 9th Earl of Southesk, in 1849.

His fourth marriage was on 25 July 1833 to Lady Frances Jocelyn (1814–1885), the second daughter of Robert Jocelyn, 3rd Earl of Roden and Maria Catherine Frances Stapleton (second daughter of Thomas Stapleton, 15th Baron Despencer). Lady Gainsborough was a Lady of the Bedchamber to Queen Victoria from 1837 to 1872 and Extra Lady of the Bedchamber from 1872 until her death in 1885. Together, they were the parents of:

- Roden Berkeley Wriothesley Noel (1834–1894), a Groom of the Privy Chamber from 1867 to 1871 who married Alice Maria Caroline de Broe, a daughter of Paul de Broe, in 1863. After his death, she married Rev. David MacAnally in 1895.
- Lady Victoria Noel (died 1916), who married Sir Fowell Buxton, 3rd Baronet, later Governor of South Australia, in 1862.

Gainsborough died in June 1866, at the age of 84, and was succeeded by his son from his second marriage, Charles. His eldest son from his third marriage, Gerard, was a Conservative politician. The dowager Countess of Gainsborough remained a widow until her death on 12 May 1885.

Parliament of the United Kingdom
Preceded by Gerard Noel; The Lord Henniker	Member of Parliament for Rutland; 1808 – 1814; With: The Lord Henniker 1808–1812; Sir Gilbert Heathcote, Bt 1812–1814	Succeeded by Sir Gilbert Heathcote, Bt; Sir Gerard Noel, Bt
Peerage of the United Kingdom
New creation	Earl of Gainsborough; 1841 – 1866	Succeeded by Charles George Noel
Preceded by Diana Noel	Baron Barham; 1823 – 1866	Succeeded by Charles George Noel
Baronetage of Great Britain
Preceded by Gerard Noel Noel	Baronet (of the Navy); 1838 – 1866	Succeeded by Charles George Noel
