= Frances Noel, Countess of Gainsborough =

The Right Honourable The Countess of Gainsborough
- Born: 20 November 1814
- Died: 12 May 1885 (aged 70)
- Spouse: Charles Noel, 1st Earl of Gainsborough
- Issue: Roden Noel; Lady Victoria Buxton
- Parents: Robert Jocelyn, 3rd Earl of Roden; Hon. Maria Frances Stapleton

Frances Noel, Countess of Gainsborough VA (née Jocelyn; 20 November 1814 – 12 May 1885) was a Lady of the Bedchamber to Queen Victoria.

== Early life and family ==
Frances Noel was a daughter of Robert Jocelyn, 3rd Earl of Roden and his wife, the Hon. Maria Frances Stapleton, daughter of Thomas Stapleton, 12th Baron le Despencer. A biographer of her daughter later described Noel's childhood environment as one of "fervent Evangelicalism".

== Marriage and issue ==
In 1833, at the age of eighteen, she became the fourth wife of Charles Noel, 3rd Baron Barham (later 1st Earl of Gainsborough). They had two children, the poet Roden Noel and the philanthropist Lady Victoria Buxton. Noel and her husband provided their children with a strong evangelical faith, and encouraged them to pursue good works. There was a large age difference between the married couple. As their two young children grew up, the earl became a chronic invalid, giving Noel more parental authority than was typical for the period.

== Lady of the Bedchamber ==
Noel had been known to Queen Victoria when she was still Princess Victoria of Kent and became a Lady of the Bedchamber to the new monarch upon her ascension in 1837. Noel at first refused the post, as her faith disallowed her from attending Victoria to the theatre; the queen assured Noel that another lady could be found when a trip to the theatre was scheduled. coronation of Queen Victoria in 1838.

In 1841, Victoria recreated an old title of Lord Barham's ancestors, naming him 1st Earl of Gainsborough.

In June 1850, she, along with Victoria's children Prince Alfred and Princess Alice, was present when a man hit the queen with a stick outside the gates of Cambridge House. Noel helped the bruised Victoria regain her posture and informed her that the man had been seized by the surrounding crowd. As well as being her namesake, the queen was a godmother to Noel's daughter Lady Victoria. In 1858, Lady Victoria served as a bridesmaid to the queen's eldest daughter the Princess Royal during her marriage to Prince Frederick William of Prussia.

The Earl of Gainsborough died in 1866 at the age of eighty-five. After resigning from her post in 1872, Noel was made an extra Lady of the Bedchamber the following year. In 1885, she died at her residence in Hyde Park Square, London. Queen Victoria offered her condolences to her goddaughter, "I cannot find words to express my deep grief at the loss of your beloved Mother, my dear and faithful friend, whom I dearly loved and whose devotion to me. For now, fifty years I knew how to appreciate, and shall ever remember with love and affection". She was a member of the Royal Order of Victoria and Albert, Third Class.

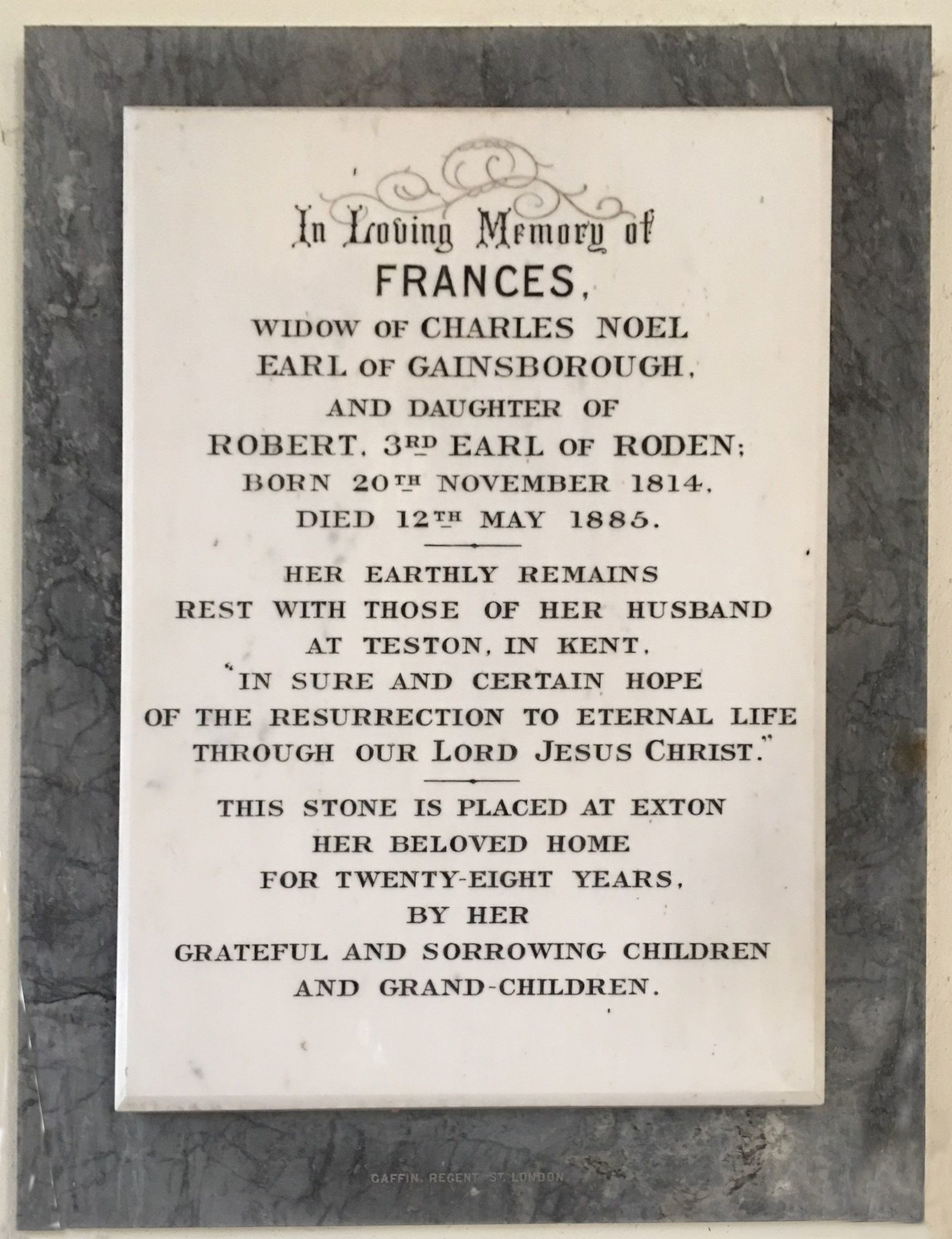
Memorial to Frances Noel, Countess of Gainsborough, in the church of St Peter & St Paul, Exton, Rutland

Coat of arms of Frances Noel, Countess of Gainsborough
Escutcheon The arms of Charles Noel, 1st Earl of Gainsborough (Or fretty Gules a canton Ermine.) impaled with the arms of Robert Jocelyn, 3rd Earl of Roden (Azure a circular wreath Argent and Sable with four hawk’s bells conjoined thereto in quadrangle Or.). Supporters On either side a Bull Argent, armed and unguled proper, gorged with a Naval Crown Azure, therefrom a Chain reflexed over the back Gold, and pendent from the crown an Escutcheon Azure, charged with an Anchor erect, encircled by a Wreath of Laurel Or.
