= Rutland County Council =

Unitary authority of local government in the district and county of Rutland

Rutland County Council District Council

Type
- Type: Unitary authority

Leadership
- Chair: Andrew Brown, Independent since 22 May 2023
- Leader: Christine Wise, Liberal Democrats since 26 March 2026
- Chief Executive: Mark Andrews since 29 June 2020

Structure
- Seats: 27 councillors
- Political groups: All parties (27) Liberal Democrats (10) Independent Group (7) Labour (2) Conservative (7) Independent (1)
- Length of term: 4 years

Elections
- Voting system: First past the post
- Last election: 4 May 2023
- Next election: 6 May 2027

Meeting place
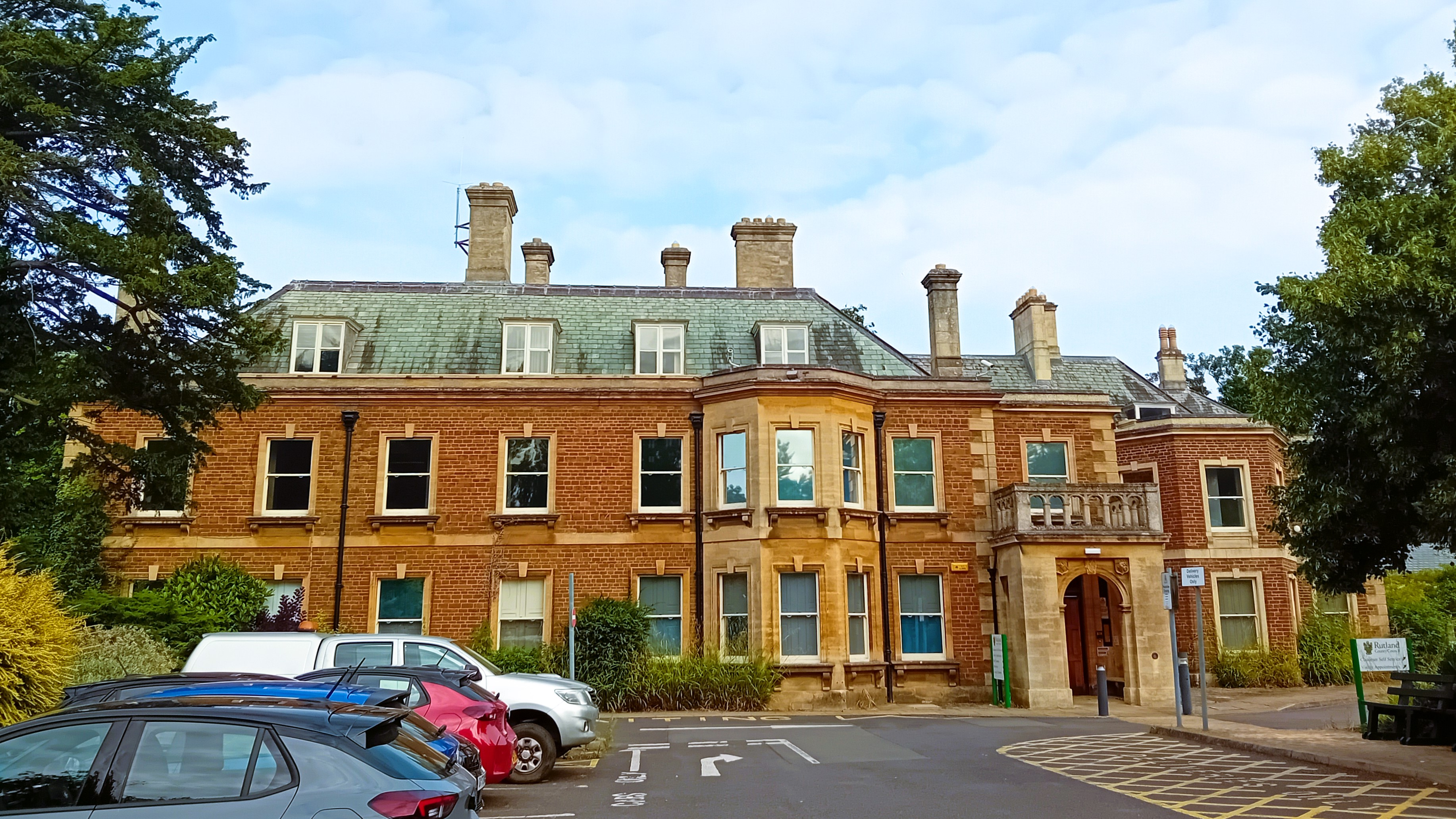
- Catmose House, Catmos Street, Oakham, LE15 6HP

Website
- www.rutland.gov.uk

Rutland County Council, officially called Rutland County Council District Council, is the local authority for the non-metropolitan county of Rutland in the East Midlands of England. Since 1997 the council has been a unitary authority, legally being a district council which also performs the functions of a county council.

The council is responsible for almost all local services in Rutland, although the Leicestershire Fire and Rescue Service and Leicestershire Police (which also serve Rutland) are run by joint boards between Rutland County Council, Leicestershire County Council and Leicester City Council.

The council has been under no overall control since 2021, being led since 2023 by Liberal Democrats. It is based at Catmose House in Oakham.

== History ==
=== First incarnation ===
Elected county councils were established in 1889 under the Local Government Act 1888, taking over administrative functions that had previously been performed by unelected magistrates at the quarter sessions. The first elections were held in January 1889 and Rutland County Council formally came into being on 1 April 1889.

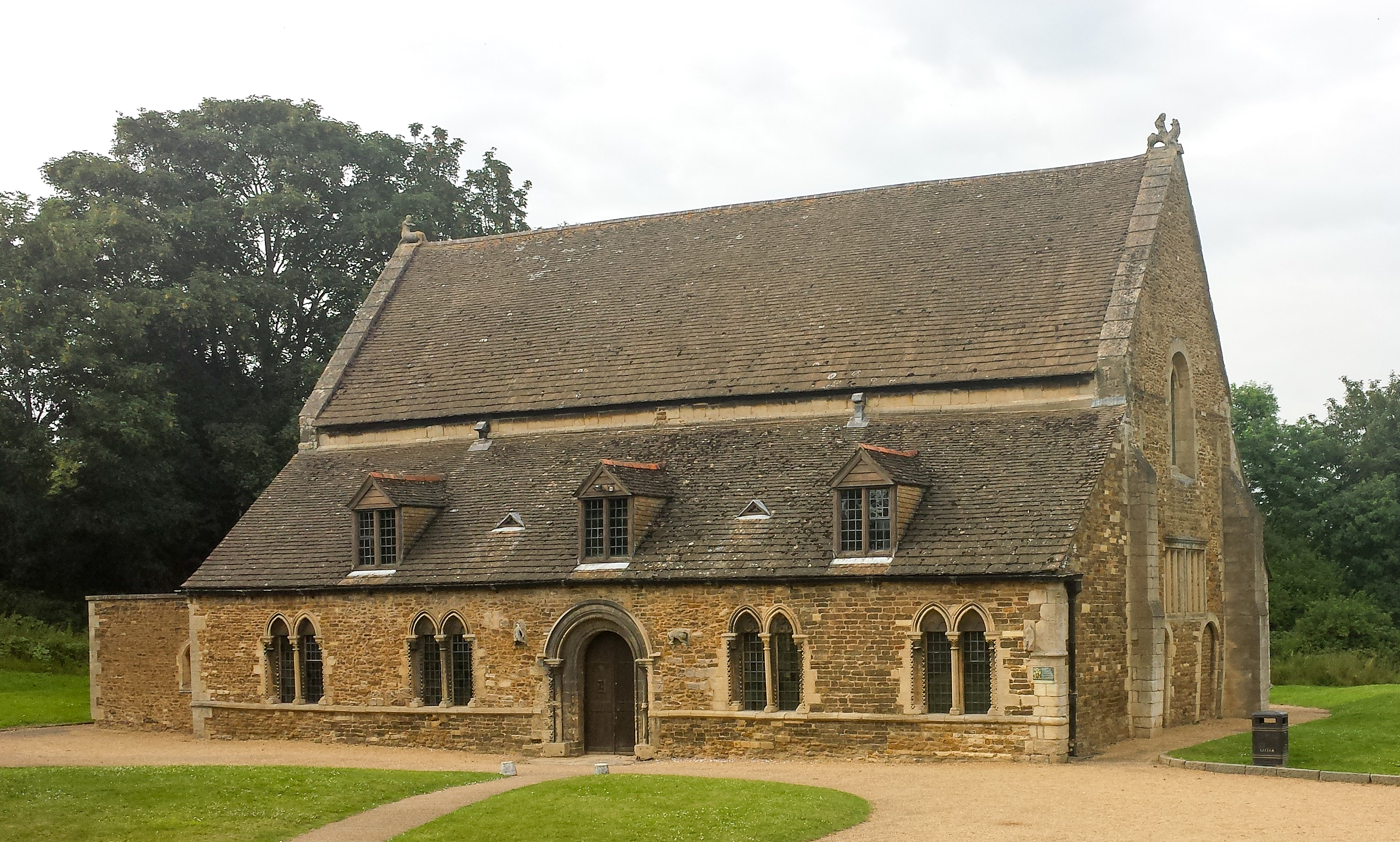
Great Hall at Oakham Castle: Council's meeting place 1889–1937

On that day it held its first official meeting at Oakham Castle, the 12th century castle which served as the county's courthouse and had been the meeting place of the quarter sessions which preceded the county council. Charles Noel, 3rd Earl of Gainsborough, a Conservative peer, was appointed as the first chairman of the council.

From 1894 there was also a lower tier of local government in the county, comprising three rural districts: Ketton Rural District, Oakham Rural District and Uppingham Rural District. A fourth district was created in 1911 when the parish of Oakham was removed from the Oakham Rural District to become its own urban district.

=== Rutland District Council ===
The first incarnation of the county council was abolished in 1974 under the Local Government Act 1972. Rutland was reconstituted as a non-metropolitan district and placed in Leicestershire. County-level functions therefore passed to Leicestershire County Council.

The Rutland District Council created in 1974 was a lower-tier district council. Although its territory was the same as the abolished county council's, in terms of functions it replaced the area's four district councils that were also abolished as part of the 1974 reforms.

=== Unitary authority ===
Local government was reformed again in Rutland in 1997, following the Local Government Commission for England, which had recommended in 1994 that Rutland (and Leicester) should become unitary authorities and leave the two-tier Leicestershire. The way the changes were implemented was to create a new non-metropolitan county of Rutland covering the same area as the district, but with no separate county council. Instead, the existing district council that had been created in 1974 additionally took on the functions that legislation assigns to county councils.

In August 1996, ahead of the changes coming into effect, the district council resolved to style itself 'Rutland County Council' from 1 April 1997 when it assumed its additional powers. As a concession to the fact that it remains legally a district council, it was agreed that the full name would have to be 'Rutland County Council District Council', but on the understanding that the full name would "be used only very sparingly and when absolutely necessary."

At the 2021 census Rutland had a population of 41,000. This made it the third least populous local government district in England, with only the two sui generis authorities of the Isles of Scilly (2,100 people) and the City of London (8,600 people) serving fewer people. The next smallest unitary authority area after Rutland is Hartlepool with 92,300 people.

== Governance ==
As a unitary authority, Rutland County Council performs both district-level and county-level functions. The council's responsibility for some county-level functions, including the fire and rescue service and the police, is exercised through joint boards with Leicestershire County Council and Leicester City Council. The whole county is also covered by civil parishes, which form a second tier of local government.

=== Political control ===
The council has been under no overall control since 2021. Following the 2023 election a minority administration of the Liberal Democrats and the single Green Party councillor formed to run the council, led by Liberal Democrat councillor Gale Waller.

Political control of the council since the 1974 reforms has been as follows:

Lower-tier district council

| Party in control | Years |
|---|---|
| Independent | 1974–1987 |
| No overall control | 1987–1995 |
| Independent | 1995–1997 |

Unitary authority

| Party in control | Years |
|---|---|
| Independent | 1997–1998 |
| No overall control | 1998–2003 |
| Conservative | 2003–2021 |
| No overall control | 2021–present |

=== Leadership ===
The leaders of the council since 1995 have been as follows:

| Councillor | Party | From | To |
|---|---|---|---|
| Eddie Martin (Note: Initially appointed as "co-ordinator", but title changed to "leader" later that year.) | Independent | 15 May 1995 | 2 Apr 1997 |
| Kim Lee | Liberal Democrats | 12 May 1997 | May 1999 |
| Edward Baines | Independent | 24 May 1999 | 2003 |
| Roger Begy | Conservative | 2003 | 1 Feb 2016 |
| Terry King | Conservative | 22 Feb 2016 | Jan 2017 |
| Tony Mathias | Conservative | 26 Jan 2017 | 8 Jan 2018 |
| Oliver Hemsley | Conservative | 5 Feb 2018 | 9 May 2022 |
| Lucy Stephenson | Conservative | 9 May 2022 | May 2023 |
| Gale Waller | Liberal Democrats | 22 May 2023 | 18 Mar 2026 |
| Christine Wise | Liberal Democrats | 26 Mar 2026 | Incumbent |

=== Composition ===
Following the 2023 election and subsequent changes to July 2026, the composition of the council was:

| Party | Seats |
|---|---|
| Liberal Democrats | 10 |
| Independent Group | 7 |
| Labour | 2 |
| Conservative | 7 |
| Independent | 1 |
| Total | 27 |

The next election is due in May 2027.

== Elections ==
Since the last boundary changes in 2019, the council has comprised 27 councillors representing 15 wards, with each ward electing one, two or three councillors. Elections are held every four years.

Current ward boundaries

| Ward | Councillors | Description |
|---|---|---|
| Braunston & Belton | 1 | Parishes of Ayston, Belton, Braunston, Brooke, Leighfield, Preston, Ridlington and Wardley |
| Cottesmore | 2 | Parishes of Barrow, Cottesmore, Market Overton and Teigh |
| Exton | 1 | Parishes of Ashwell, Burley, Egleton, Exton, Hambleton, Horn and Whitwell |
| Greetham | 1 | Parishes of Clipsham, Greetham, Pickworth, Stretton and Thistleton |
| Ketton | 2 | Parishes of Barrowden, Ketton, Tinwell and Tixover |
| Langham | 1 | Parish of Langham |
| Lyddington | 1 | Parishes of Bisbrooke, Caldecott, Glaston, Lyddington, Seaton, Stoke Dry and Thorpe by Water |
| Martinsthorpe | 1 | Parishes of Gunthorpe, Lyndon, Manton, Martinsthorpe, Morcott, Pilton and Wing |
| Normanton | 2 | Parishes of Edith Weston, Empingham, Normanton, North Luffenham, South Luffenham |
| Oakham North East | 2 | Oakham northwest of Burley Road/Mill Street/South Street and east of the railway |
| Oakham North West | 2 | Oakham north of Braunston Road and west of the railway, and the parish of Barleythorpe |
| Oakham South East | 2 | Oakham southeast of Burley Road/Mill Street/South Street and east of the railway |
| Oakham South West | 2 | Oakham south of Braunston Road and west of the railway |
| Ryhall & Casterton | 2 | Parishes of Essendine, Great Casterton, Little Casterton, Ryhall and Tickencote |
| Uppingham | 3 | Parishes of Uppingham and Beaumont Chase |
| Whissendine | 1 | Parish of Whissendine |

== Premises ==
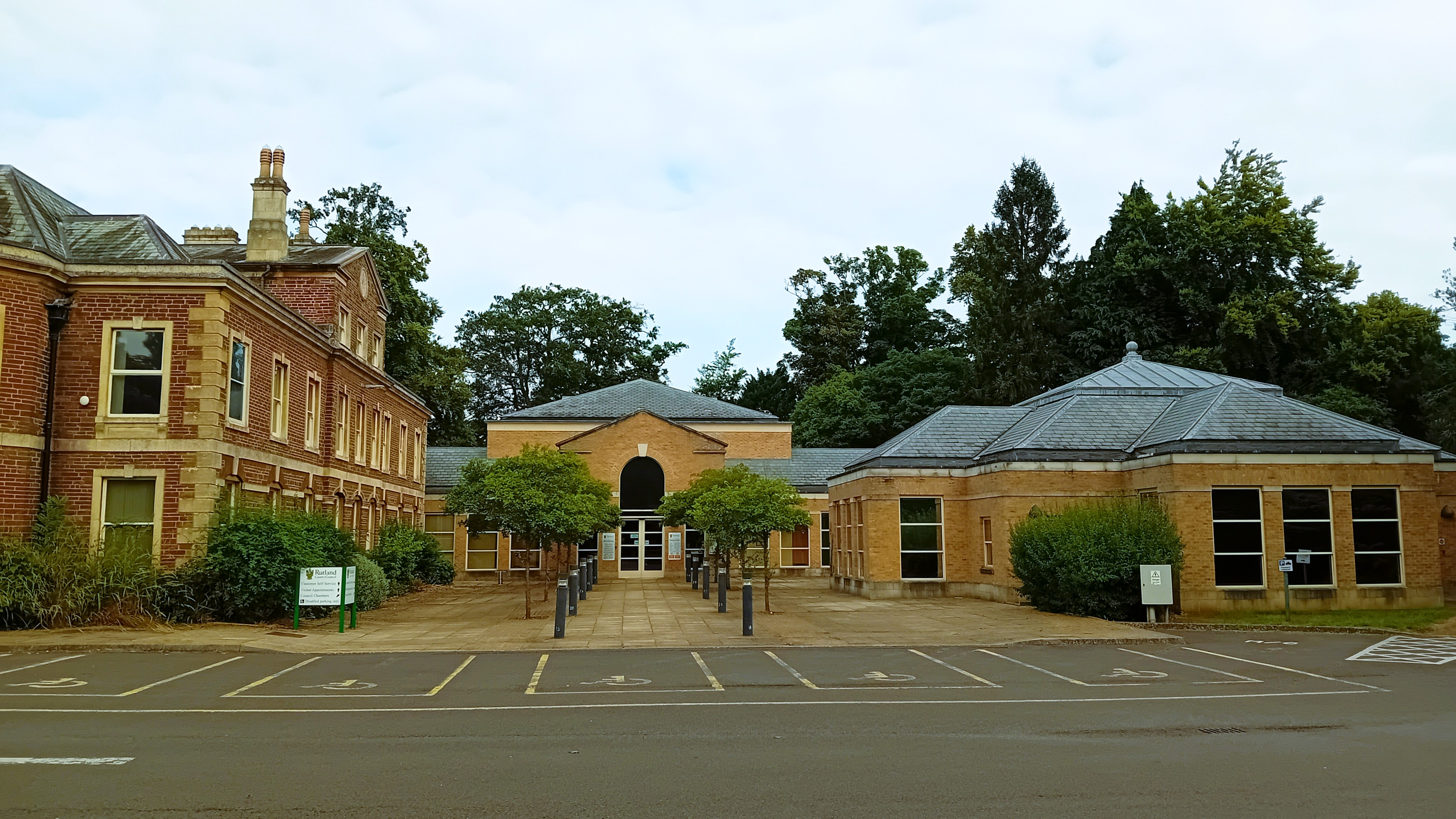
Modern extensions to Catmose House, including main public entrance

The council is based at Catmose House on Catmos Street in Oakham. It was built in the late 18th century as a large house. The building was bought in 1937 by the county council, which had previously met at Oakham Castle and had its offices scattered around various premises in the town. Catmose House subsequently served as the headquarters of Rutland District Council after 1974, continuing to be the council's headquarters after it became a unitary authority in 1997, with large extensions being built shortly afterwards.

As at April 2024, the council is considering whether to retain Catmose House as its headquarters or move to alternative premises.

== Arms ==
Coat of arms of Rutland County Council
| Notes First granted to Rutland County Council on 1 May 1950. Transferred to Rutland District Council in 1974, and continues to be used by the council after it became a unitary authority in 1997. Crest On a wreath of the colours in front of a horseshoe an acorn Or leaved and slipped Proper. Escutcheon Vert semée of acorns a horseshoe Or. Motto Multum in Parvo (Much in Little) |

== See also ==
- Rutland County Council elections
