= Sir Fowell Buxton, 3rd Baronet =

Australian politician (1837–1915)

Sir Fowell Buxton Bt GCMG DL
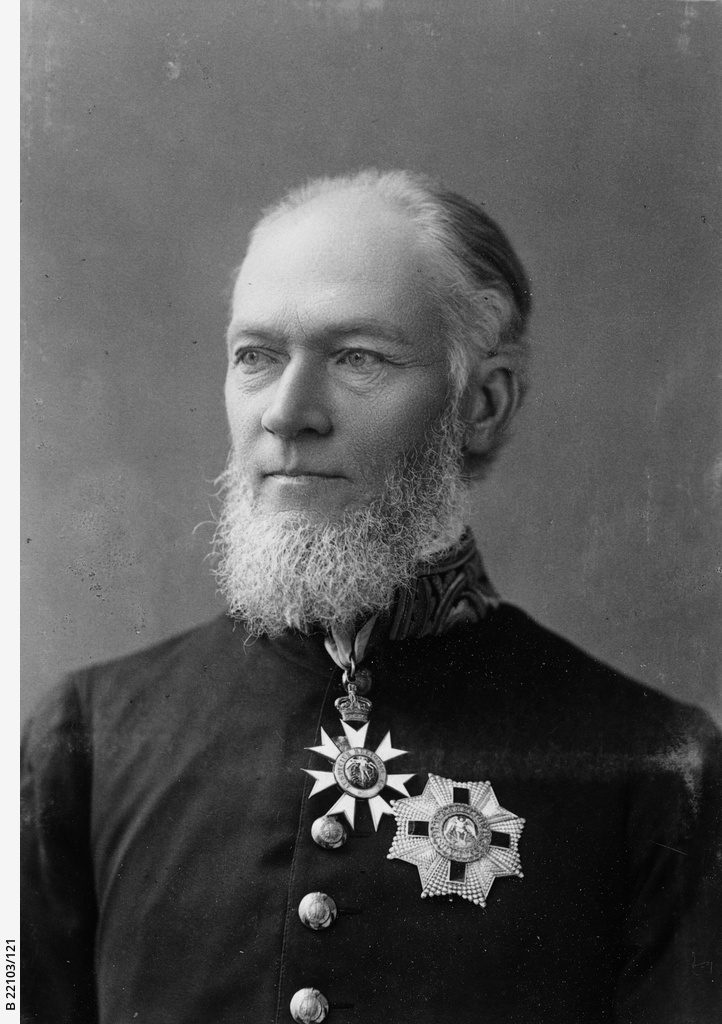

13th Governor of South Australia
- In office 29 October 1895 – 29 March 1899
- Monarch: Victoria
- Premier: Charles Kingston
- Preceded by: The Rt. Hon. Earl of Kintore
- Succeeded by: Lord Tennyson

Personal details
- Born: 26 January 1837 London, United Kingdom
- Died: 28 October 1915 (aged 78) Cromer, United Kingdom

Sir Thomas Fowell Buxton, 3rd Baronet, GCMG, DL (26 January 1837 – 28 October 1915), commonly known as Sir Fowell Buxton, was the Governor of South Australia from 29 October 1895 until 29 March 1899. He was the grandson of Sir Thomas Fowell Buxton, a British MP and social reformer, and the son of Sir Edward North Buxton, also an MP.

He attended Harrow School and Trinity College, Cambridge. He raised the part-time 3rd (Truman, Hanbury, Buxton) Tower Hamlets Rifle Volunteer Corps mainly from employees of the family's Black Eagle Brewery in Spitalfields and was commissioned as its captain commandant on 4 May 1860. The unit became part of the 1st Administrative Battalion, Tower Hamlets Rifle Volunteer Corps (later 2nd Tower Hamlets Rifles), in which he was promoted to major on 24 July 1863 and lieutenant-colonel on 23 January 1864. Sir Fowell retired from the command on 23 November 1883 and became the unit's Honorary Colonel on 9 February 1884.

Buxton was appointed a Deputy Lieutenant of Essex in 1860.

He married Lady Victoria Noel, daughter of Charles Noel, 1st Earl of Gainsborough, and Lady Frances Jocelyn, daughter of Robert Jocelyn, 3rd Earl of Roden on 12 June 1862. Of their 13 children, ten survived infancy, including Sir Thomas Buxton, 4th Baronet, Noel Edward Noel-Buxton, 1st Baron Noel-Buxton, Charles Roden Buxton, and Rt. Rev. Harold Jocelyn Buxton, Bishop of Gibraltar in Europe. Lady Buxton was crippled by a spinal condition in 1869.

Sir Fowell was elected as Liberal Member of Parliament (MP) for King's Lynn at the 1865 general election, but was defeated at the 1868 election. After his defeat, he stood again for Parliament unsuccessfully on several other occasions: in Westminster at the 1874 general election, in Western Essex at the 1880 general election and at the by-elections in Northern Norfolk in 1876 and 1879. He was appointed High Sheriff of Norfolk in 1876.

When Buxton was appointed governor, the Premier of South Australia, Charles Kingston was angry that the South Australian government had not been involved in the decision about who should be the new governor, so made life as hard as possible for Buxton and his family. The governor's allowance was reduced and customs duty was charged on their household items (including his wife's invalid carriage). Buxton took up the job anyway, and later was described as the most genial, sociable and common-sense governor, due to his gentle and unassuming friendliness. He visited gaols and hospitals, and showed genuine interest in Aboriginal culture during his time as governor. He eventually returned to England due to the ill-health of his wife.

Buxton was appointed a Knight Commander of the Order of St Michael & St George (KCMG) in 1895, on his appointment as Governor and Commander-in-Chief of South Australia. He was promoted to Knight Grand Cross of the Order (GCMG) in 1899.

A memorial to Sir Fowell and his wife Victoria was erected in St Thomas' Church in Upshire in Essex in 1917, designed by Sir Robert Lorimer.

== Notes ==
Parliament of the United Kingdom
Preceded by John Henry Gurney; Lord Stanley	Member of Parliament for King's Lynn; 1865 – 1868; With: Lord Stanley	Succeeded by Robert Bourke; Lord Stanley
Government offices
Preceded by The Earl of Kintore	Governor of South Australia; 1895–1899	Succeeded by The Lord Tennyson
Baronetage of the United Kingdom
Preceded by Edward North Buxton	Baronet (of Belfield); 1849 – 1915	Succeeded by Thomas Fowell Victor Buxton
