= Rowland Cotton (Royal Navy officer) =

Royal Navy admiral (1740–1794)

Vice-Admiral Rowland Cotton
- Born: c.1740 Cheshire
- Died: 30 November 1794 (aged 53–54); Plymouth Dockyard
- Spouse: Elizabeth Aston
- Relatives: Sir Lynch Cotton (father); Sir Robert Cotton (brother); Sir Willoughby Cotton (son)
- Military career
- Allegiance: Kingdom of Great Britain
- Branch: Royal Navy
- Service years: 1753–1794
- Rank: Vice-Admiral
- Commands: HMS Druid HMS Alarm HMS Pallas HMS Buffalo HMS Inflexible HMS Vengeance HMS Culloden HMS Robust; Plymouth Command
- Conflicts: Seven Years' War; American Revolutionary War; Second Relief of Gibraltar; French Revolutionary Wars

Vice-Admiral Rowland Cotton (c. 1740 – 30 November 1794) was a senior Royal Navy officer.

== Naval career ==
Cotton joined the Royal Navy at the Royal Naval Academy in 1753. He was given command of the sloop, HMS Druid in 1762. Promoted to captain on 7 May 1764, he went on to command the frigate, HMS Alarm in 1764, the fifth-rate, HMS Pallas in 1776 and the storeship HMS Buffalo in 1780. After that he was given command of the third-rate HMS Inflexible in 1780, the third-rate HMS Vengeance in 1782 and the third-rate HMS Culloden in 1783, as well as the third-rate HMS Robust in 1790. He was then promoted to Rear-Admiral of the White and appointed Commander-in-Chief, Plymouth in 1793. He was promoted to Rear-Admiral of the Red and then Vice-Admiral of the Blue in 1794.

Military offices
Preceded by Phillips Cosby	Commander-in-Chief, Plymouth; 1793–1794	Succeeded by Sir Richard King
