= Nathaniel Smith (British politician) =

Nathaniel Smith MP

Member of Parliament for Rochester
- In office 1792 – 6 May 1794 Serving with George Best
- Preceded by: Richard Bickerton
- Succeeded by: Richard King
- In office 1784–1790 Serving with Charles Middleton
- Preceded by: Robert Gregory
- Succeeded by: Richard Bickerton

Personal details
- Born: 1730
- Died: 6 May 1794 (aged 63–64)
- Political party: Whig
- Spouse: Hester Dance (m. 1784)

Nathaniel Smith (1730 – 6 May 1794) was a Bombay Marine officer and politician who sat in the House of Commons of Great Britain between 1783 and 1794.

Smith was the posthumous son of naval captain Nathaniel Smith of St Giles-without-Cripplegate and his wife Anne Gould, daughter of James Gould. Smith joined the Bombay Marine of the East India Company (EIC) and was appointed captain of the East Indiaman Clinton in 1759. In 1765 he transferred to Lord Camden. After six voyages to India he retired in 1771 with a small fortune. He stood for parliament unsuccessfully at Rochester in 1772 and in 1780.

Smith wrote three pamphlets on Company rule in India and two on the EIC's shipping problems. He became a director of the company in 1774. In February 1783, Smith was elected Member of Parliament (MP) for Pontefract until he was unseated on petition in April 1783. However he vigorously opposed Fox's East India Bill and was consequently elected chairman of the EIC in November 1783.

In 1784 Smith was elected MP for Rochester and held the seat until 1790. He offered guarded support for Warren Hastings in the debate on his impeachment in 1787. He regained the seat in a by-election in 1792 and held it until his death aged 63 in 1794.

Smith married Hester Dance, daughter of George Dance on 4 December 1784. He provided support for his wife's nephew Nathaniel Dance in his dealings with the East India Company.

Parliament of Great Britain
Preceded by William Nedham; 4th Viscount Galway	Member of Parliament for Pontefract; 1783; With: William Nedham	Succeeded by William Nedham; John Smyth
Preceded by George Finch-Hatton; Robert Gregory	Member of Parliament for Rochester; 1784–1790; With: Sir Charles Middleton	Succeeded by George Best; Sir Richard Bickerton
