= Charles Middleton, 1st Baron Barham =

Royal Navy officer and politician (1726–1813)

Admiral The Right Honourable The Lord Barham PC
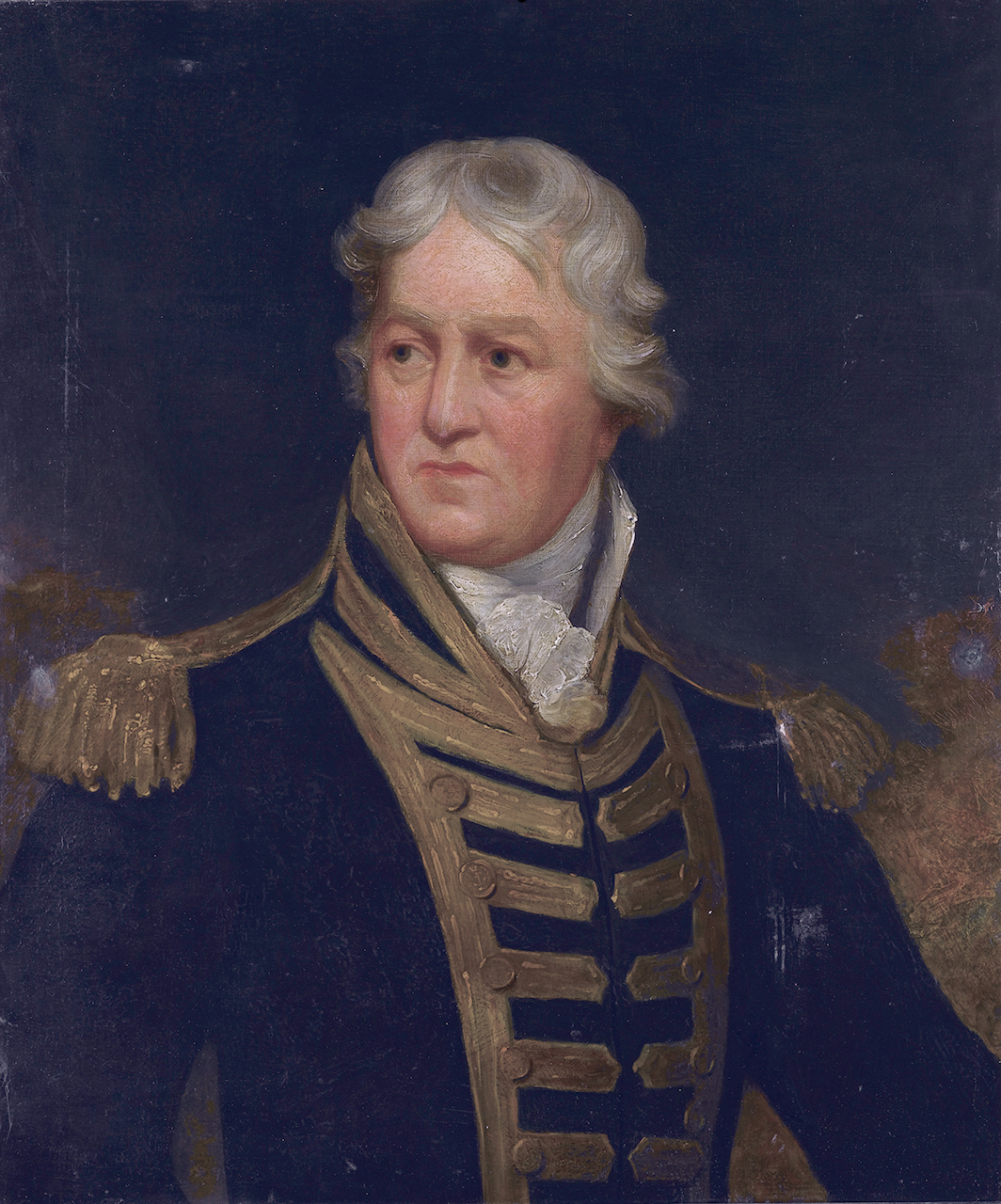
- Portrait by Isaac Pocock, c. 1795–1812

Member of Parliament for Rochester
- In office 1784–1790
- Preceded by: George Finch-Hatton
- Succeeded by: George Best

Personal details
- Born: 14 October 1726 Leith, Midlothian
- Died: 17 June 1813 (aged 86) Barham Court, Teston, Kent
- Known for: Abolitionism

Military service
- Allegiance: Great Britain; United Kingdom
- Branch/service: Royal Navy
- Years of service: 1741–1813
- Rank: Admiral of the Red
- Commands: HMS Arundel; HMS Emerald; HMS Adventure
- Battles/wars: Seven Years' War; American Revolutionary War; French Revolutionary Wars; Napoleonic Wars

Admiral of the Red Charles Middleton, 1st Baron Barham, PC (14 October 1726 – 17 June 1813) was a Royal Navy officer and politician. As a junior officer he saw action during the Seven Years' War. Middleton was given command of a guardship at the Nore, a Royal Navy anchorage in the Thames Estuary, at the start of the American War of Independence, and was subsequently appointed Comptroller of the Navy. He went on to be First Naval Lord and then First Lord of the Admiralty.

== Early life ==
Charles Middleton was born at Leith, Midlothian to Robert, a customs collector of Bo'ness, Linlithgowshire, and Helen, daughter of Captain Charles Dundas RN and granddaughter of Sir James Dundas of Arniston. He was a nephew of Brigadier-General John Middleton (1678–1739), a grandson of George Middleton DD, and a great-grandson of Alexander Middleton (younger brother of John Middleton, 1st Earl of Middleton), the last two having served as Principal of King's College, Aberdeen.

== Marriage and family ==
On 21 December 1761, Charles married Margaret Gambier (c.1731 – 10 October 1792), daughter of James Gambier and Margaret Mead, at St Martin-in-the-Fields, Westminster, London. Margaret was the sister of Vice-Admiral James Gambier (1723–1789) and a niece of Captain Mead, captain of the Sandwich. Margaret's first encounter with Charles was aboard the Sandwich some twenty years earlier. Margaret later moved to Teston in Kent, to be close to her friend Elizabeth Bouverie. After their marriage, Charles and Margaret made their home at Barham Court in Teston where they lived until their respective deaths. Charles and Margaret had one daughter, Diana, later Diana Noel, 2nd Baroness Barham, born 18 September 1762.

Charles and Margaret also raised Margaret's nephew, James, later James Gambier, 1st Baron Gambier, born 13 October 1756.

In 1786, Charles and Margaret adopted Charles's nephew Robert Gambier Middleton (November 1774 – 21 August 1882), the eldest son of Charles's elder brother Captain George Middleton (1724–1794) and Elizabeth Wilson. Robert Gambier Middleton attained the rank of Rear-Admiral on 9 June 1832.

== Naval career ==
Middleton entered the Royal Navy in 1741 as captain's servant aboard HMS Sandwich and HMS Duke, and later served aboard HMS Flamborough as midshipman and master's mate. He became lieutenant in 1745, serving aboard the frigate HMS Chesterfield, after 1748 on the west Africa station. During the Seven Years' War, from 1754, Middleton was stationed aboard HMS Anson during her apprehension and capture of two French ships at Louisbourg, after which he was stationed in the Leeward Islands. In January 1757, an incident over rum rations, during which Middleton lost his temper and physically attacked a sailor ended with the sailor being court martialled and Middleton being transferred and promoted to command of the sloop HMS Speaker.

Promoted to post-captain on 22 May 1758, Middleton was given command of the frigate HMS Arundel. In 1761, while in command of HMS Emerald, he distinguished himself in the West Indies, taking sixteen French ships and several privateers, and received the gratitude of the merchants in the British colony of Barbados. From March 1762 Middleton took command of the frigate Adventure, patrolling the coast of Normandy. In 1763, after service aboard the Adventure, Charles moved to join Margaret Gambier, whom he had married in December 1761, at Teston, and for the next twelve years, he farmed the land belonging to Mrs Bouverie, taking on the role of a country gentleman. In 1775, at the outbreak of the American War of Independence, Middleton was given a guardship at the Nore, a Royal Navy anchorage in the Thames Estuary, and was subsequently appointed Comptroller of the Navy in 1778, a post he held for twelve years. In 1781 was created a baronet, with a special remainder, failing any male issue, to his son in law, Gerard Noel.

"I find politics have got too great a hold on [the Navy Board] for me to withstand it ...

I shall contend no more for the public, having raised a nest of hornets already by so doing. I trust those who follow me will have more weight than I have had, and influence ministers to correct these evils."

— Extract from an unsent letter to John Montagu, First Lord of the Admiralty in 1786. Middleton resigned his Navy Board positions in 1790.

In 1784, Middleton was elected as a Tory Member of Parliament (MP) for Rochester, a seat he held for six years, and on 24 September 1787 he was promoted rear admiral. By 1786 he had become disillusioned with his role as Comptroller of the Navy, seeing it as beset by internal politics between the Admiralty and the Navy Board. In 1786 he prepared a letter to the First Lord of the Admiralty indicating he would "contend no more for the public," and urging the appointment of a successor who could "have more weight than I have had, and influence ministers to correct these evils." The letter was never sent, but Middleton resigned his position in 1790 and effectively retired from naval affairs.

Promotions based on seniority continued to be received, despite Middleton's retirement from active service. He was promoted to Vice-Admiral of the White on 1 February 1793, and again to Vice-Admiral of the Red on 12 April 1794; in May 1794, Middleton was appointed to the Board of Admiralty. He became First Naval Lord on 7 March 1795 and was promoted to Admiral of the Blue on 1 June 1795 and Admiral of the White on 14 February 1799. In May 1805 Middleton was appointed First Lord of the Admiralty. He was also created Baron Barham, of Barham Court and Teston in the County of Kent, with a special remainder, failing male issue, to his only child, his daughter, Diana Noel, 2nd Baroness Barham, and her male heirs. On 9 November 1805 Middleton was promoted to Admiral of the Red before resigning his office in 1806 and dying seven years later at the age 86 at his estate of Barham Court.

== Abolitionist ==
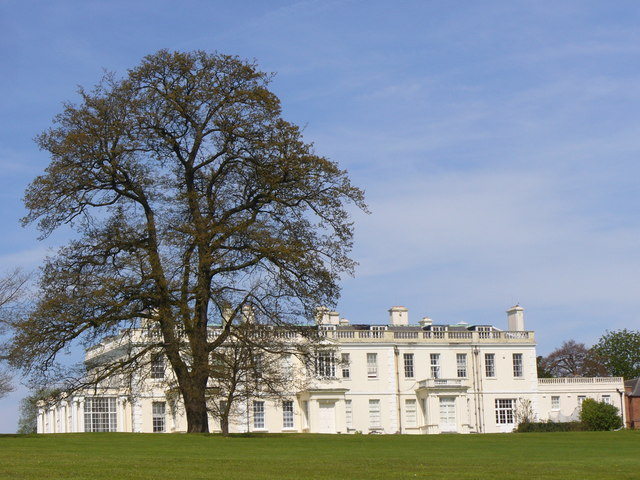
Barham Court, the family seat

In addition to his service in the Royal Navy, Middleton played a crucial role in the abolition of British involvement in the Atlantic slave trade. He had been influenced by a pamphlet written by James Ramsay, who served as a surgeon under Middleton aboard Arundel in the West Indies before taking holy orders and serving on the Caribbean island of Saint Kitts, where he observed first-hand the brutal mistreatment of enslaved people. In 1777, exhausted by the continuing conflict with influential planters and businessmen, Ramsay returned to Britain and briefly lived with Middleton and his wife at Teston. He later became vicar of Teston and rector of Nettlestead, Kent, the livings being in the gift of Middleton.

Ramsay's 1784 pamphlet Essay on the Treatment and Conversion of African Slaves in the British Sugar Colonies especially affected Middleton's wife. Feeling inadequate to take up the issue of the slave trade in Parliament himself, and knowing that it would be a long, hard battle, Middleton suggested the young MP William Wilberforce as the one who might be persuaded to take up the cause. (Whether this was the first time that the issue had been suggested to Wilberforce is debatable). In 1787 Wilberforce was introduced to Ramsay and Thomas Clarkson at Teston, as well as meeting the Testonites, a growing group of supporters of abolition which also included Edward James Eliot, Hannah More and Beilby Porteus.

Clarkson had first made public his desire to spend his life fighting for emancipation at Middleton's home, Barham Court, overlooking the River Medway at Teston, Kent. In order to make a case for abolishing the slave trade, Clarkson did much research over many years, gathering evidence by interviewing thousands of sailors who had been involved in the trade. Barham Court was effectively used for planning the campaign by Lord and Lady Barham, with numerous meetings and strategy sessions attended by Wilberforce, Clarkson, Eliot and Porteus before presenting legislation to Parliament. While Middleton never played a direct role in the effort to abolish the slave trade (finally accomplished in 1807) and slavery itself (in 1833) he played a very important part as a behind the scenes facilitator. His efforts were motivated by his evangelical faith.

== Legacy ==
A key leader in the Royal Navy (1778–1807), he was an austere but politically liberal public official. As Comptroller of the Navy, First Lord of the Admiralty, and Commissioner, his success in handling the problems of supply, construction, inefficiency, and insubordination made a critical contribution to Britain's naval victories in the Napoleonic wars, according to Bernard Pool.

Three warships of the Royal Navy have been named Barham in honour of Middleton including the battleship Barham launched in 1914. A fourth was planned but never completed. Barham Building at HMS Nelson, Portsmouth (HMNB Portsmouth), is also named after Middleton.

== Fictional portrayals ==
Barham is a character in Treason's Tide by Robert Wilton, set during the summer of 1805. He is also portrayed by the simple moniker of Admiral Barham in Naomi Novik's alternative history fiction series, Temeraire, in the second novel, Throne of Jade, (published with Del Rey in 2006) in which he is depicted as arbitrating a dispute between the Chinese delegation and the British government over the possible return of Captain William Laurence's dragon Temeraire to China. His political relationship with William Wilberforce and the Abolitionist movement in Britain is also referenced in the work. He is also a minor character in the second book "Post Captain" in the Patrick O'Brian series of Aubrey-Maturin books.

== See also ==
- List of abolitionists
- List of abolitionist forerunners

== Sources ==
- Rodger, N.A.M. (1979). The Admiralty. Offices of State. Lavenham: T. Dalton Ltd. ISBN 0900963948.

Parliament of Great Britain
Preceded by George Finch-Hatton; Robert Gregory	Member of Parliament for Rochester; 1784–1790; With: Nathaniel Smith	Succeeded by George Best; Sir Richard Bickerton, Bt
Military offices
Preceded by Maurice Suckling	Comptroller of the Navy; 1778–1790	Succeeded by Sir Henry Martin
Preceded by Lord Hood	First Naval Lord; March 1795–November 1795	Succeeded by James Gambier
Preceded by The Viscount Melville	First Lord of the Admiralty; 1805–1806	Succeeded by Viscount Howick
Baronetage of Great Britain
New creation	Baronet (of The Navy); 1781–1813	Succeeded by Gerard Noel
Peerage of the United Kingdom
New creation	Baron Barham; 1805–1813	Succeeded by Diana Noel
