= Mark Milbanke =

Royal Navy Admiral and colonial governor (1724–1805)

Admiral Mark Milbanke
- Born: 12 April 1724; Halnaby Hall, Darlington
- Died: 9 June 1805 (aged 81); London, England
- Spouse: Mary Webber
- Relatives: Sir Ralph Milbanke, 4th Baronet (father)
- Military career
- Allegiance: United Kingdom
- Branch: Royal Navy
- Service years: 1736–1805
- Rank: Admiral
- Commands: HMS Serpent; HMS Inverness; HMS Romney; HMS Guernsey; HMS Barfleur; HMS Princess Royal; HMS Namur; North Sea Fleet; Plymouth Command; Newfoundland Command; Portsmouth Command
- Conflicts: War of the Austrian Succession; Battle of Cartagena de Indias; Seven Years' War; Action of 5 April 1757; American Revolutionary War; Battle of Cape Spartel

Viceregal styles of Mark Milbanke
- Reference style: His Excellency
- Spoken style: Your Excellency

Admiral Mark Milbanke (12 April 1724 – 9 June 1805) was a British naval officer and colonial governor.

== Military career ==
Milbanke was born into an aristocratic Yorkshire family with naval connections, his father was Sir Ralph Milbanke, 4th Baronet. Mark Milbanke graduated from the Royal Naval Academy, Portsmouth in 1740. He was made Lieutenant in 1744 and in 1746 was given command of HMS Serpent. He became Port Admiral at Plymouth in 1783.

In 1789, Milbanke was appointed governor of Newfoundland. In the years when settlement was prohibited on the Island of Newfoundland, Milbanke did his best to enforce this prohibition. He did so by demolishing buildings, and by limiting the number of Irish people immigrating to Newfoundland. He also refused to allow the building of a Roman Catholic chapel at Ferryland.

He was appointed Commander-in-Chief, Portsmouth in 1799.

Milbanke was promoted to admiral of the white in 1795. In 1805 he fell over the banisters at his home and died from his injuries.

== Family ==
Milbanke married Mary Webber (died 1812); they had a son and two daughters. Ralph (died 1823) was a naval captain. Elizabeth Mary, the younger daughter, married William Huskisson. Harriet, the elder daughter, married Philemon Tilghman, son of James Tilghman.

== See also ==
- Governors of Newfoundland
- List of people from Newfoundland and Labrador

Military offices
| Preceded by Sir Molyneux Shuldham | Commander-in-Chief, Plymouth; 1783–1786 | Succeeded by Sir Thomas Graves |
Political offices
| Preceded by John Elliott | Commodore Governor of Newfoundland; 1789–1791 | Succeeded by Sir Richard King |
Military offices
| Preceded by Sir Peter Parker | Commander-in-Chief, Portsmouth; 1799–1803 | Succeeded by Lord Gardner |
