= Sir Richard King, 1st Baronet =

Royal Navy Admiral (1730–1806)

Admiral Sir Richard King Bt
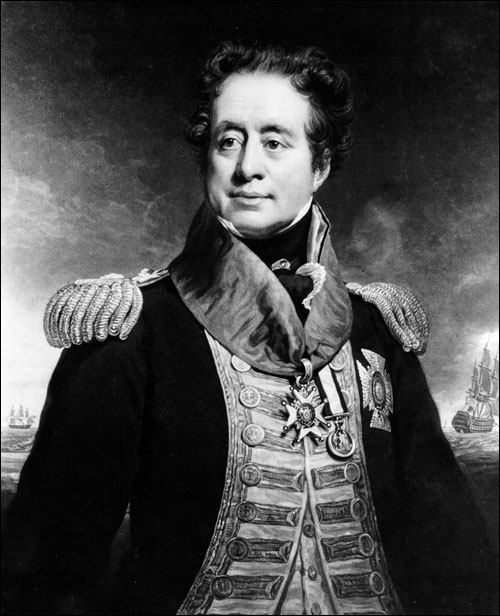

Member of the Great Britain Parliament for Rochester
- In office 1794–1800 Serving with George Best (Note: Served from 1794-1796); Henry Tufton (Note: Served from 1796-1800)
- Preceded by: Nathaniel Smith; George Best
- Succeeded by: Parliament of the United Kingdom

Member of Parliament for Rochester
- In office 1801–1802 Serving with Henry Tufton
- Preceded by: Parliament of Great Britain
- Succeeded by: Sir Sidney Smith; James Hulkes

Commodore Governor of Newfoundland
- In office 1792–1793
- Preceded by: Mark Milbanke
- Succeeded by: Sir James Wallace

Commander-in-Chief, The Downs
- In office 1790–1791
- Preceded by: Vacant (Note: Station was not active from 1791-1793)
- Succeeded by: Vacant (Note: Station was not active from 1782-1790)

Commander-in-Chief, Plymouth
- In office 1794–1796
- Preceded by: Rowland Cotton
- Succeeded by: Sir Richard Onslow

Personal details
- Born: 10 August 1730
- Died: 7 November 1806 (aged 76)
- Military career
- Allegiance: Kingdom of Great Britain
- Branch: Royal Navy
- Rank: Admiral
- Commands: HMS Blaze; HMS Grafton; HMS Northumberland; HMS Pallas; HMS Exeter; The Downs; Plymouth Command

Viceregal styles of Sir Richard King
- Reference style: His Excellency
- Spoken style: Your Excellency

Admiral Sir Richard King, 1st Baronet (10 August 1730 – 7 November 1806) was a British naval officer and colonial governor.

== Naval career ==
King was born in Gosport, the son of Curtis King and Mary Barnett.

He joined the Royal Navy in 1738 and served on HMS Berwick. In 1745 made a lieutenant in HMS Tiger and in 1756 he was promoted to commander of the fireship HMS Blaze. He took part in the capture of Calcutta in 1756 and commanded the landing party at the capture of Hoogly in 1757.

In 1763 he was given command of HMS Grafton and in 1770 he took over HMS Northumberland. He went on to command HMS Pallas from 1778 and HMS Exeter from 1779.

He was knighted in 1782 for his services near Madras, India. Promoted Rear Admiral in 1787, he was appointed commander-in-chief of The Downs in 1790. In 1792 he became a baronet and was made commander-in-chief and Governor of Newfoundland. While King was in office France had declared war on Britain and King captured St. Pierre and Miquelon for the British and was promoted Vice-Admiral in 1793.

He was elected Member of Parliament for Rochester in 1794, holding the seat until 1802. In 1794 he was appointed Commander-in-Chief, Plymouth and in 1795 promoted to Admiral.

== Family ==
In 1769 he married Susannah Margaretta Coker; they had four recorded children including his son Richard.

== See also ==
- Governors of Newfoundland
- List of people from Newfoundland and Labrador

== Notes ==
Military offices
Vacant	Commander-in-Chief, The Downs; 1790–1791	Vacant
Preceded by Rowland Cotton	Commander-in-Chief, Plymouth; 1794–1796	Succeeded by Sir Richard Onslow
Parliament of Great Britain
Preceded by George Best; Nathaniel Smith	Member of Parliament for Rochester; 1794–1800; With: George Best 1794–1796; Henry Tufton, from 1796	Succeeded by Parliament of the United Kingdom
Parliament of the United Kingdom
Preceded by Parliament of Great Britain	Member of Parliament for Rochester; 1801–1802; With: Henry Tufton	Succeeded by Sir Sidney Smith; James Hulkes
Political offices
Preceded by Mark Milbanke	Commodore Governor of Newfoundland; 1792–1793	Succeeded by Sir James Wallace
Baronetage of Great Britain
New creation	Baronet (of Bellevue); 1792–1806	Succeeded by Richard King
