= Phillips Cosby =

Royal Navy Admiral (1729–1808)

Admiral Phillips Cosby
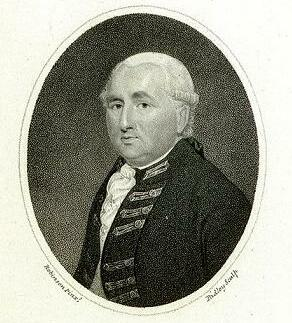
- Born: c.1729 Annapolis Royal, Nova Scotia
- Died: 10 January 1808 (aged 78–79); Bath
- Burial place: Bath Abbey
- Military career
- Allegiance: Kingdom of Great Britain
- Branch: Royal Navy
- Service years: 1747–1801
- Rank: Admiral
- Commands: HMS Laurel; HMS Beaver; HMS Hind; HMS Isis; HMS Montreal; HMS Centaur; HMS Robust; HMS Trusty; Mediterranean Fleet; Cork Station; Plymouth Command; Irish Impress Service
- Conflicts: Seven Years' War; Siege of Louisbourg; Battle of the Plains of Abraham; American Revolutionary War; Battle of Ushant; Siege of Charleston; Battle of Cape Henry; Napoleonic Wars

Admiral Phillips Cosby (c. 1729 – 10 January 1808) was a Royal Navy officer who fought in the American Revolutionary War.

== Naval career ==
Cosby joined the Royal Navy as an ordinary seaman in 1747. He was given command of a schooner at the Siege of Louisbourg in 1758 and was present at the capture of Quebec in 1759.

Promoted to Post Captain in 1761, he commanded HMS Hind and HMS Isis. In 1766 he was appointed to HMS Montreal.

He was receiver general (treasurer) of the Caribbean island of Saint Kitts from 1771 to 1778, a lucrative post which he resigned on the outbreak of the Anglo-French War. In command of HMS Centaur in 1778, he took part in the Battle of Ushant and in command of HMS Robust in 1779, he took part in the Siege of Charleston in 1780. He also took part in the Battle of Cape Henry in 1781.

He was appointed Commander-in-Chief, Mediterranean Fleet in 1785, Commander-in-Chief at Cork in 1790, and Port Admiral at Plymouth in 1792.

== Family ==
In 1792 he married Eliza Hurst, née Gunthorpe.

== Sources ==
Stewart, William (2009). Admirals of the World: A Biographical Dictionary, 1500 to the Present. McFarland. ISBN 978-0-7864-3809-9.

Military offices
Preceded by John Lindsay	Commander-in-Chief, Mediterranean Fleet; 1785–1789	Succeeded by Joseph Peyton
Preceded by Sir Richard Bickerton	Commander-in-Chief, Plymouth; 1792–1793	Succeeded by Rowland Cotton
