= James Hulkes =

English brewer, banker, and politician

James Hulkes (1770–1821) was an English brewer, banker and politician who sat in the House of Commons from 1802 to 1806.

Hulkes was the son of a brewer and was himself a brewer and banker of the city of London.

Hulkes was elected member of parliament (MP) for Rochester in 1802 at an election "contested with considerable warmth". He held the seat until 1806. He opposed Pitt's second ministry and supported Fox.

Hulkes died on 29 January 1821 at Tovil near Maidstone, aged 51.

Hulkes' grandson, Henry Stephen Hulkes (1812–1884), migrated 1843 to South Australia where he was a close associate of Alexander Tolmer and a companion of the explorer John Jackson Oakden. The Hulkes Hills near Lake Torrens bear his name.

Parliament of the United Kingdom
Preceded by Hon. Henry Tufton; Sir Richard King	Member of Parliament for Rochester; 1802–1806; With: Sir Sidney Smith	Succeeded by John Calcraft; James Barnett
