= HMS Barham =

Three warships of the Royal Navy have been given the name HMS Barham in honour of Charles Middleton, 1st Baron Barham. A fourth was planned but never completed:

- HMS Barham (1811) was a 74-gun third rate ship of the line launched in 1811. She was reduced to a 50-gun ship in 1826, and was broken up in 1840.
- HMS Barham was to have been a wooden screw frigate. She was ordered in 1860 but was later cancelled.
- HMS Barham (1889) was a third-class cruiser launched in 1889 and scrapped in 1914.
- HMS Barham (04) was a Queen Elizabeth-class battleship launched in 1914 and sunk by a U-boat in 1941.
