= Carl Frederik von Breda =

Swedish painter (1759–1818)

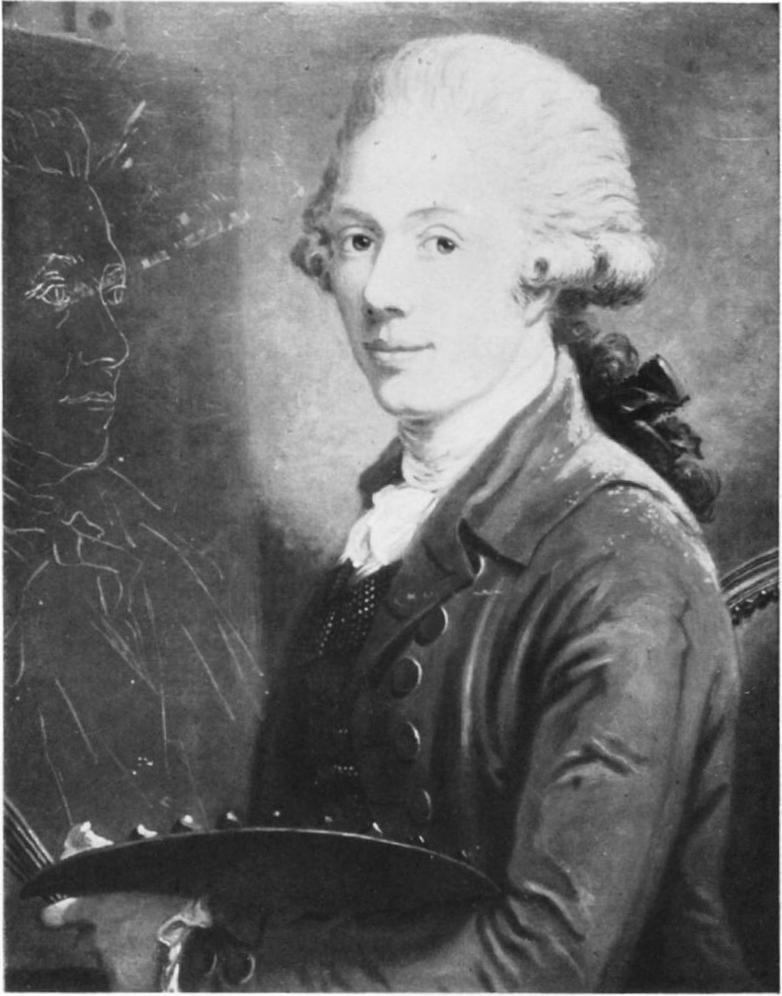
- Self portrait, 1787
- Born: 16 August 1759; Stockholm, Sweden
- Died: 1 December 1818 (aged 59); Stockholm, Sweden
- Education: Royal Swedish Academy of Arts
- Known for: Painting

Carl Frederik von Breda (16 August 1759 – 1 December 1818) was a Swedish painter who studied in and spent much of his career in Britain before becoming painter to the Swedish court. He was born in Stockholm in 1759, and moved to Britain where he was a student of Joshua Reynolds. Breda specialized in painting portraits and was called "the van Dyck of Sweden". He returned to Sweden 1796 where he became professor at the Academy of Arts, a popular portraitist, and a court painter. Breda married at age 22 and his son, Johan Fredrik, was also a painter, who studied under his father. Breda died in Stockholm in 1818.

== Early life ==
Breda's great-grandfather Pieter emigrated to Stockholm around the year 1670 from the Netherlands. The "von Breda" family name seems to indicate a connection with the city of Breda. Von is not a Dutch preposition, but in the Nordic countries, this originally German preposition has occasionally been used as a part of names of ennobled families of native or foreign, but non-German, origin. Pieter's son Lucas (Carl's grandfather, 1676–1752) was a successful painter. His son Lucas (Carl's father, 1726–1799) was an "arbitrator in cases of shipwreck", who also collected art. Lucas the younger married Johanna Cornelia Piper and they had five children, with Carl born on 16 August 1759. Carl had "an excellent education" and enrolled in the Royal Swedish Academy of Arts at age 19.

At the Academy, Breda studied historical and portrait painting. Lorens Pasch the Younger was Breda's master there, and Breda's early works show this influence very clearly, especially in his color palette. In 1780 Breda received the first of many prizes for his art, and in 1784 he exhibited 19 paintings in the first exhibition which the Academy arranged. The same year he saw his first royal portrait, one of Duchess Hedvig Elisabeth Charlotte, sister-in-law to King Gustavus III. He also painted the Crown Prince, Gustavus Adolphus, and Gustavus III himself.

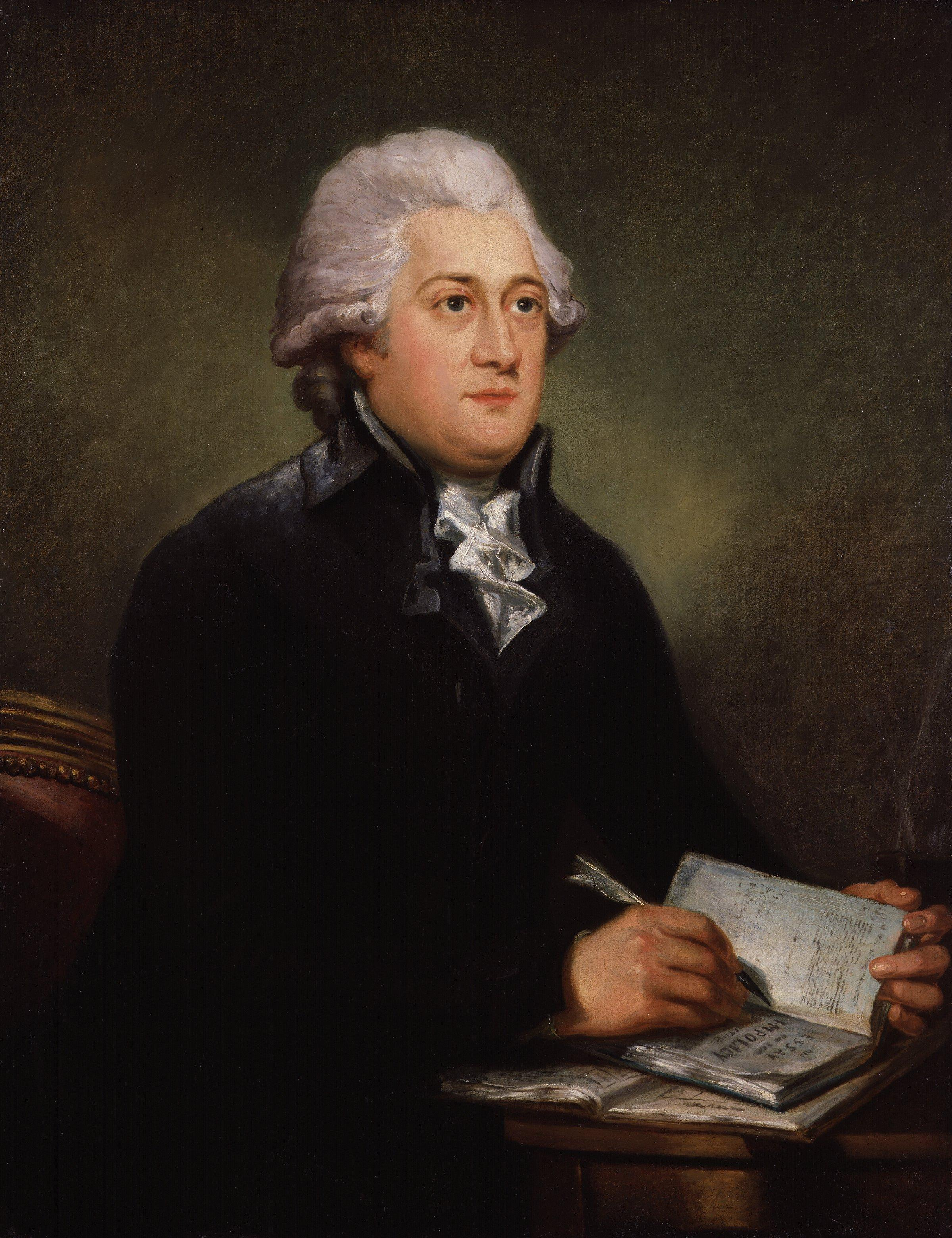
1788 Portrait of abolitionist Thomas Clarkson

In 1786 he entered a competition in historical painting at the Academy, producing a painting on the theme of Meleager, the Greek Prince. He lost to Jonas Åkerström. According to Asplund, "the selection was influenced by the better financial position of Breda, since he was able to provide the money for the journey abroad which the prize money was to make possible." Breda had married at age 22 and he and his wife had at least one son, so instead of the usual young artist's trip to Paris and Rome, he chose to go to London, where his family could accompany him. In London, Breda's son Johan Fredrik von Breda, was born in 1788.

== Great Britain ==
In Britain, Breda was exposed to the work of many great painters and was able to study with Joshua Reynolds. Reynolds was said by his pupil James Northcote to "not trouble himself much with his students", but his influence on Breda led to a "revolutionary change" in Breda's style, and through him had an effect on many subsequent Swedish portrait painters. Breda painted a portrait of Reynolds, which was his diploma picture for his admission to the Stockholm Academy of Arts in 1791.

Breda established a London studio in St James's Street and quickly became a popular portraitist with "learned men and literati" and "many lovely ladies". Among those he painted portraits of while in London were the abolitionists Thomas Clarkson, James Ramsay and Charles Bernhard Waldström, as well as engineers James Watt and Matthew Boulton. These last two were members of the Lunar Society and were painted by Breda on a visit to Birmingham in 1792. The portrait of Watt is in the National Portrait Gallery, London and that of Boulton in Birmingham Museum and Art Gallery. Others associated with the Lunar Society whose portraits Breda painted included the botanist and scientist William Withering and Mary Priestley, wife of chemist and theologian Joseph Priestley.

== Return to Sweden ==
Breda returned to Stockholm in 1796, where he became a professor at the Academy and received many orders for portraits. According to Asplund, his "bold, spirited brushwork, which he had learnt in England, aroused admiration in Sweden" and his finest portraits were painted in 1797 and 1798 and sees the dawn of Romanticism in his later works. These include paintings of his father Lucas, two of his nephews, the scholar and humanist Nils von Rosenstein, and the singer Teresa Vandoni. This last is considered his most celebrated work.

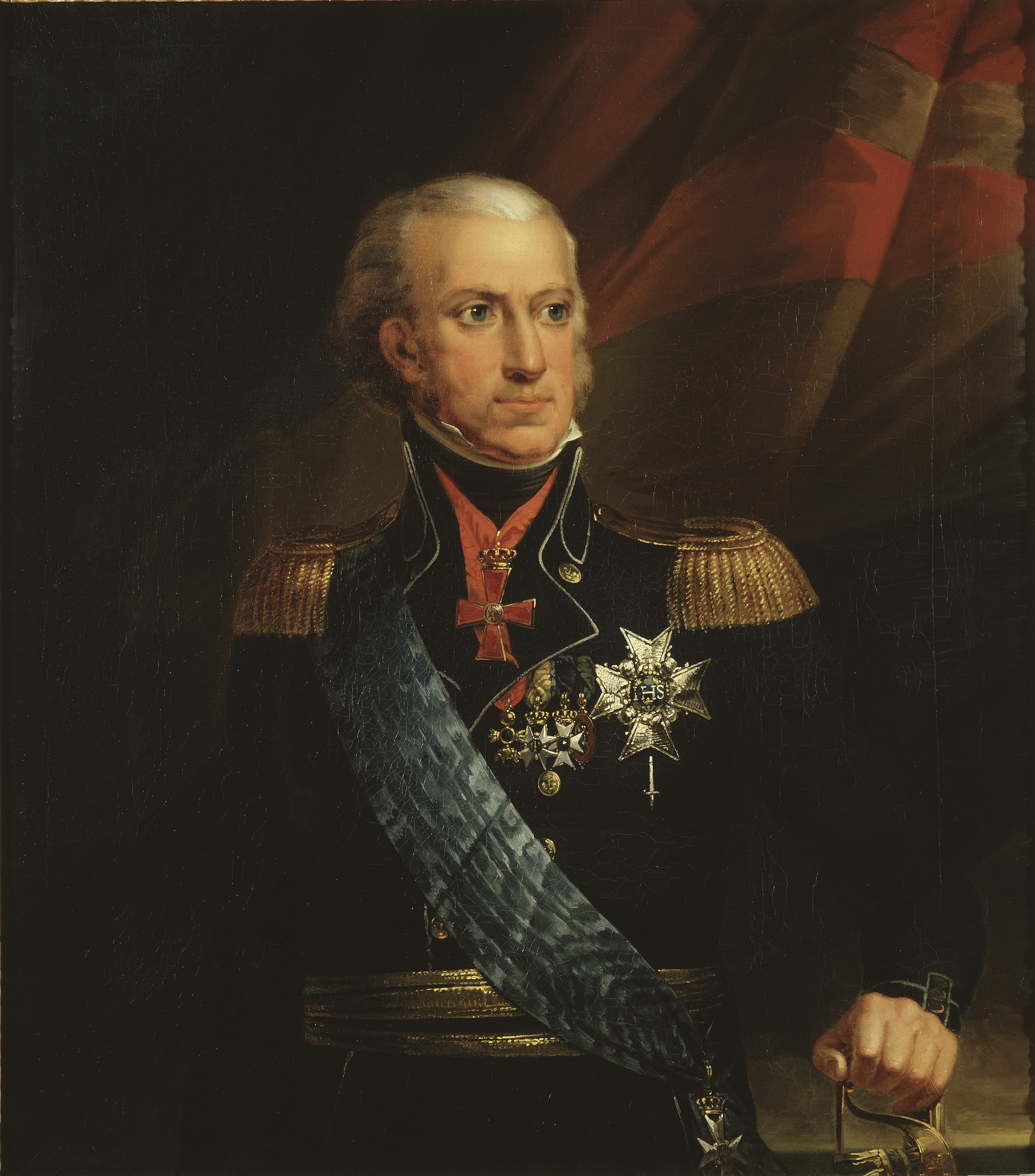
Portrait of Charles XIII of Sweden

According to Asplund, the longer he stayed in Sweden, the more monotonous Breda's portraits became. He inherited his father's house and art collection, and they became a center of culture in Stockholm. Breda taught students, including his son Johan, and was known as a kind and sympathetic teacher.

Breda received official commissions: after the monarchy fell in 1809, he painted a series of portraits of the "four Estates of the Realm" from 1811 on, and in 1812 he was ennobled. However, the political uncertainty and upheaval in Sweden at the time often interfered with his work. He failed to complete at least two planned paintings - in 1800 he was commissioned to paint the coronation of Gustav IV Adolf, whom he had painted as a child, but there were many delays and the king was deposed in 1809 before the painting could be completed.

A similar commission to paint the coronation of Gustav IV Adolf's Uncle, Charles XIII also was delayed repeatedly. Breda had difficulties finding a suitable studio to work in, and when he finally did, had to vacate it after two years for the sculptor Johan Niclas Byström. The work in progress was rolled up, but when he tried to complete it two years later, the painting had been ruined. The Swedish Parliament refused a grant to complete the painting in 1818 and Breda died soon after of a cerebral hemorrhage, on 1 December. His son Johan also had a career as a portrait painter and died in Stockholm in 1835.

Today Breda's works hang in many museums, including the Pera Museum in Istanbul, National Trust, Birmingham Museum and Art Gallery, National Portrait Gallery in London, the National Gallery of Art in Washington D.C., the Finnish National Gallery in Helsinki, and, in Stockholm, the Nationalmuseum and Academy of Arts.

== Gallery ==
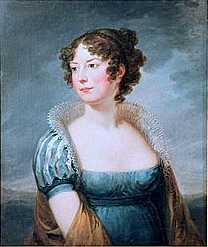
Sophie Piper, sister-in-law to Axel von Fersen

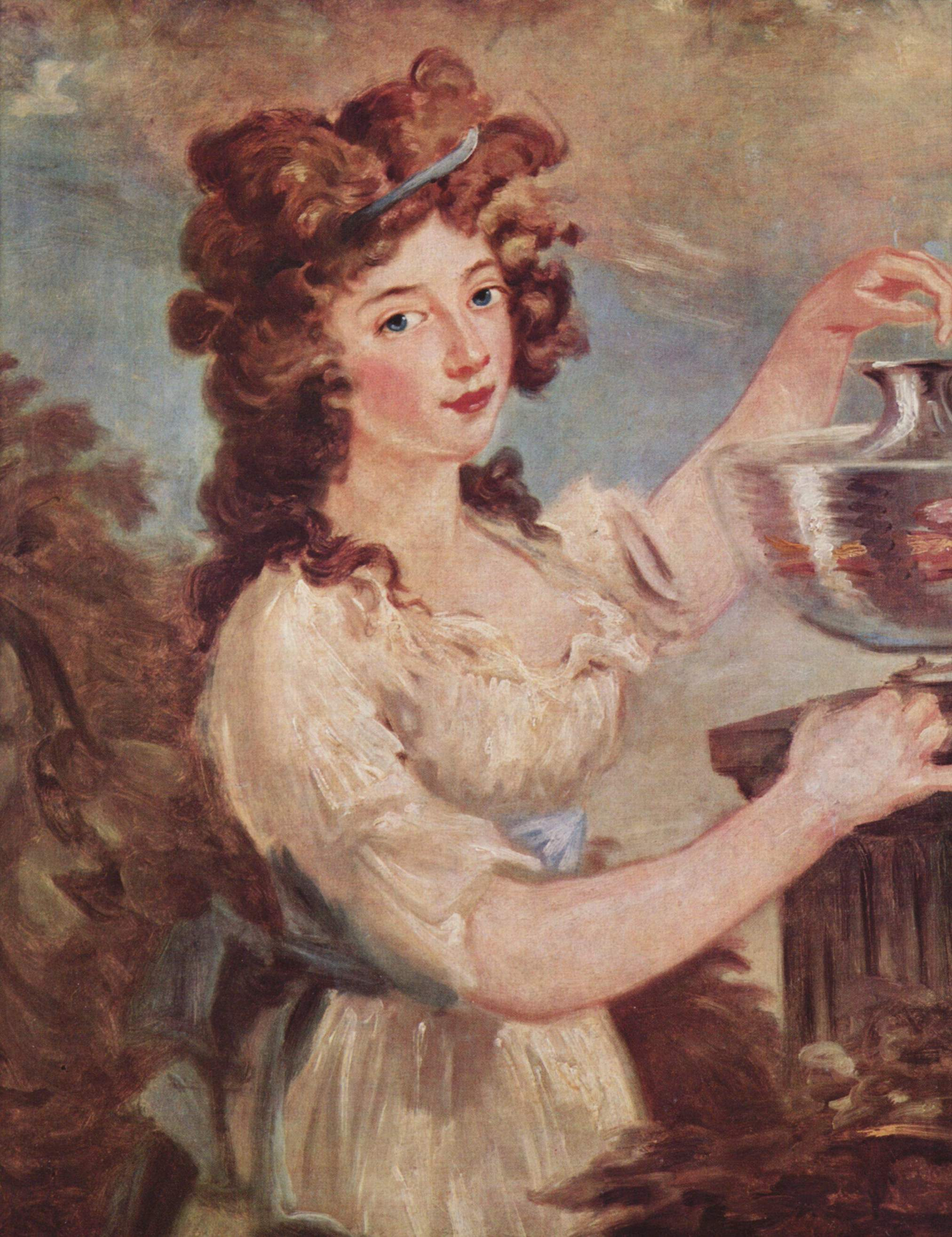
Girl with Goldfish

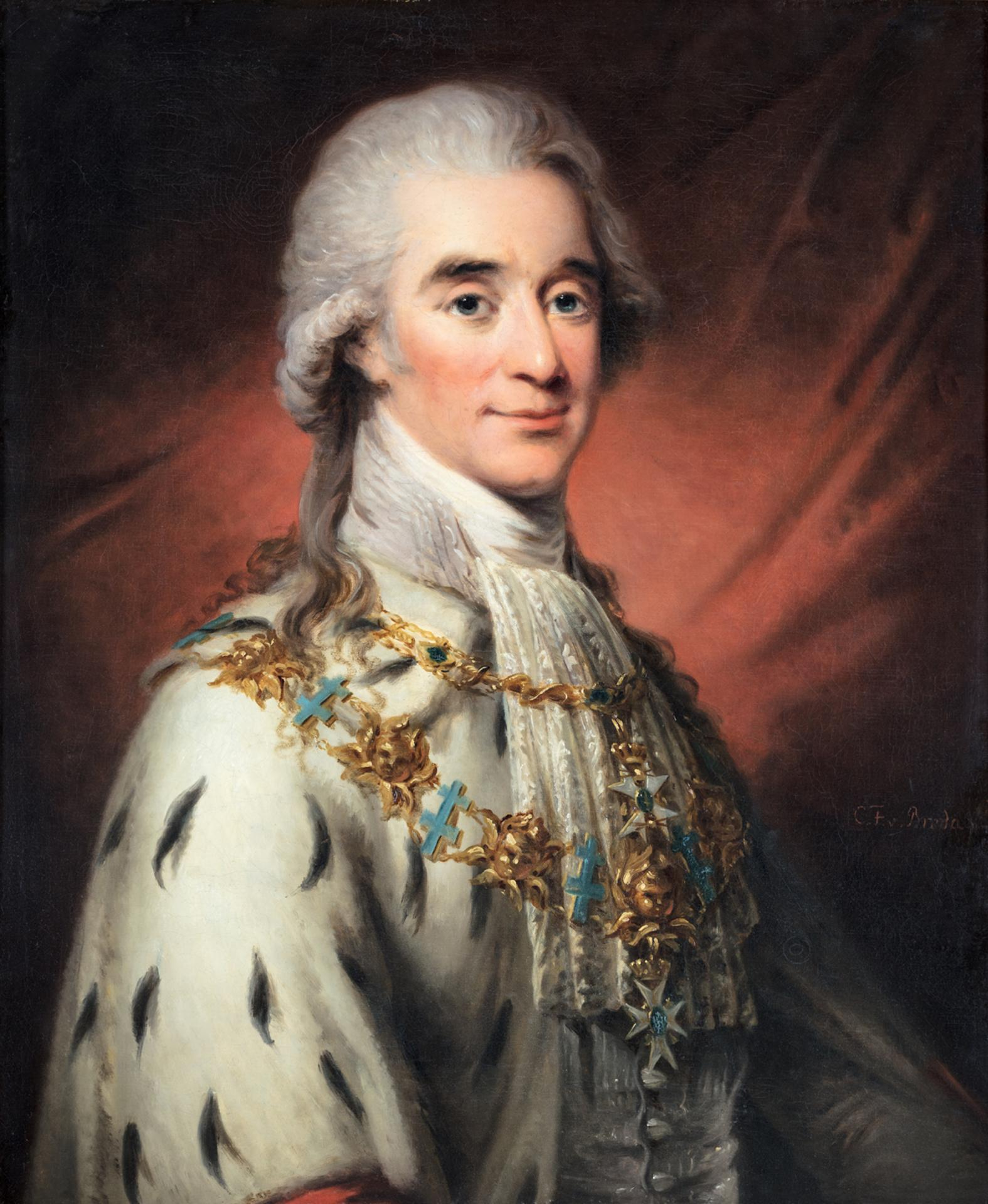
Axel von Fersen

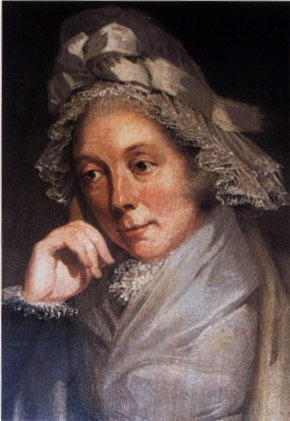
Mary Priestley, wife of Joseph Priestley (1793)

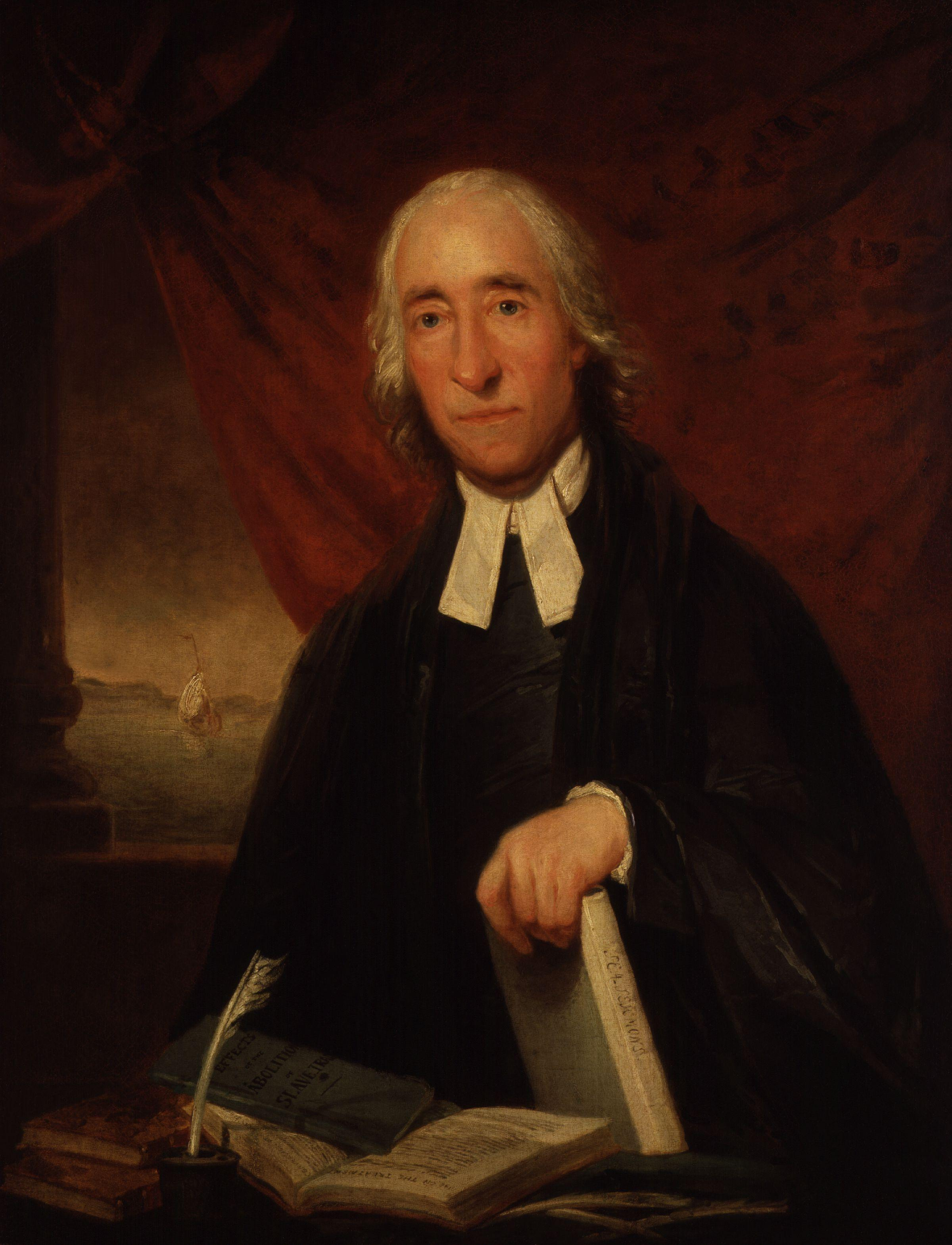
James Ramsay

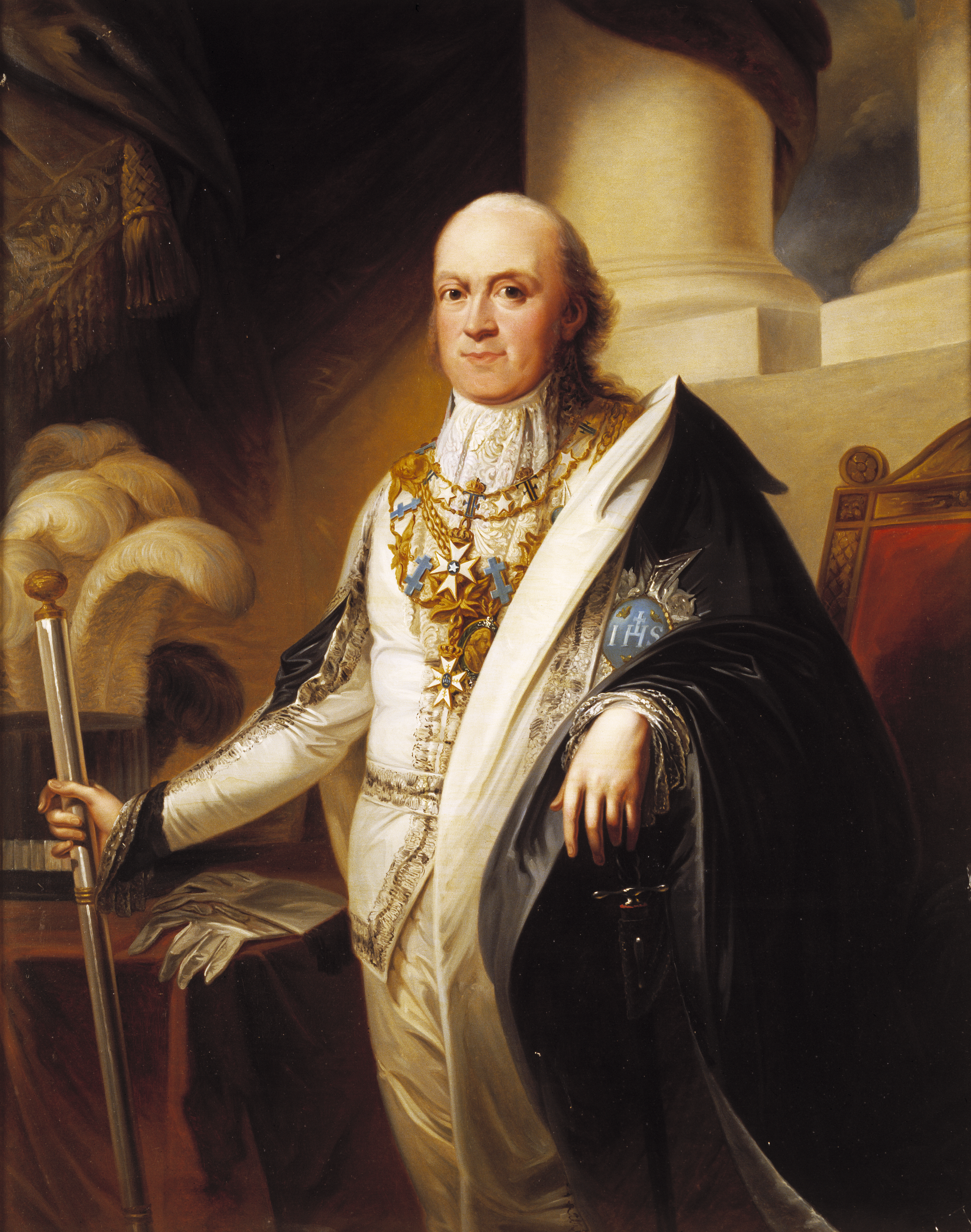
Magnus Fredrik Brahe

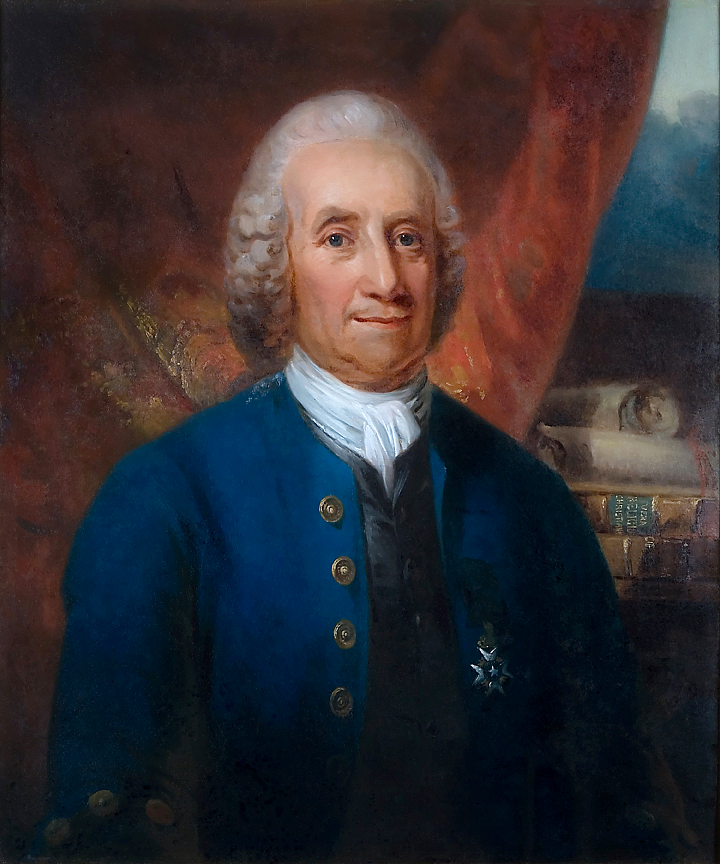
Emanuel Swedenborg

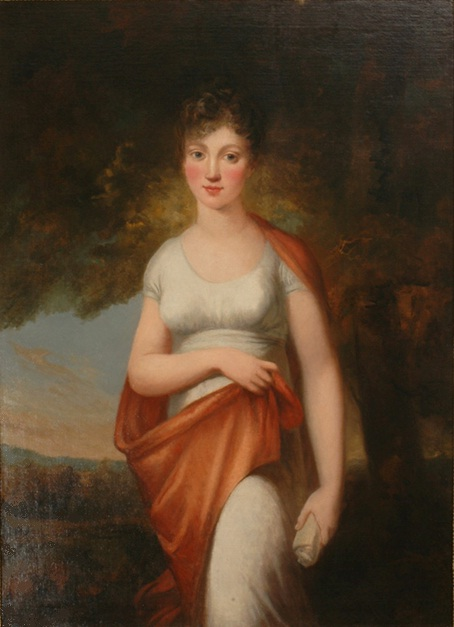
Charlotte of Mecklenburg

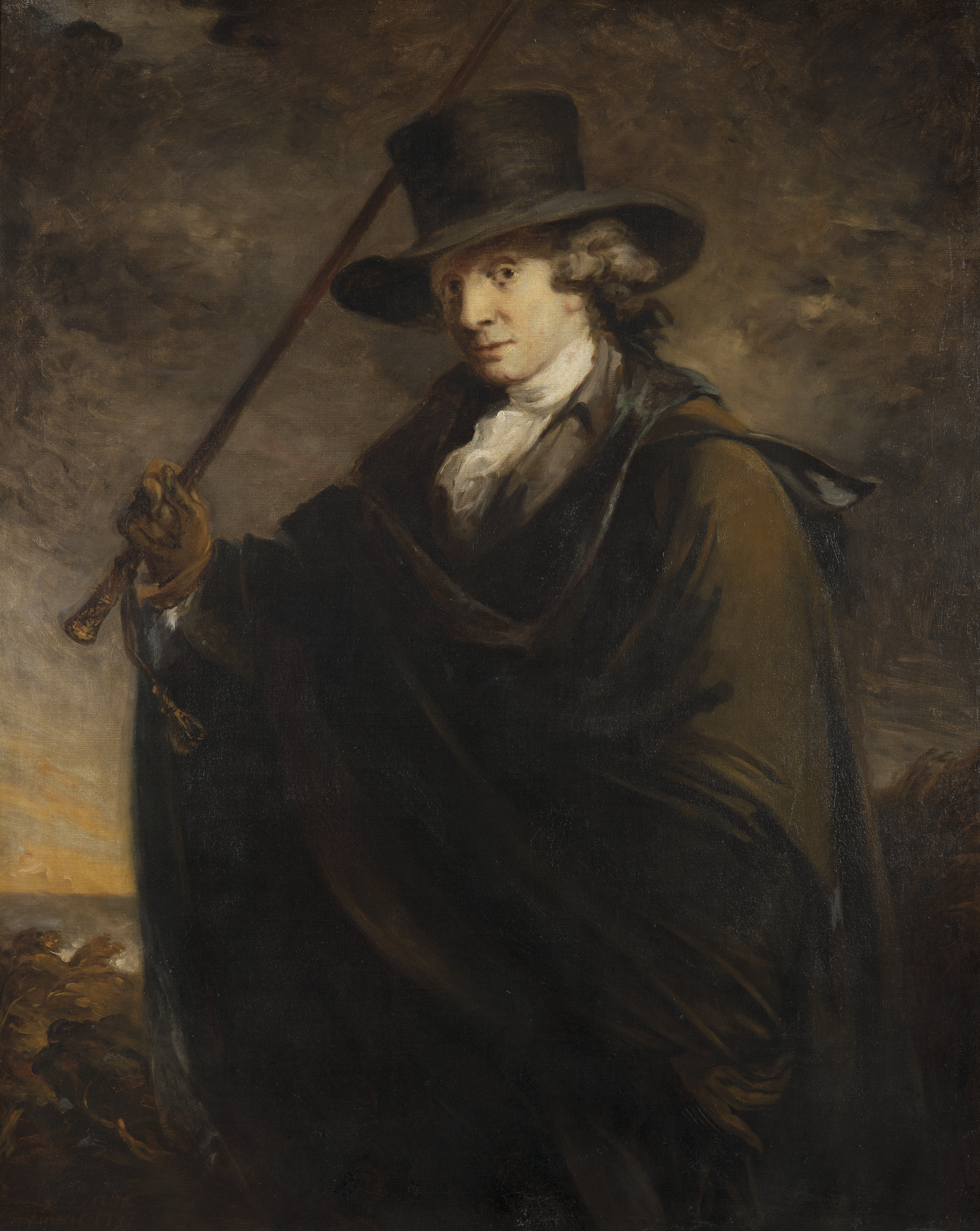
The Artist's Father

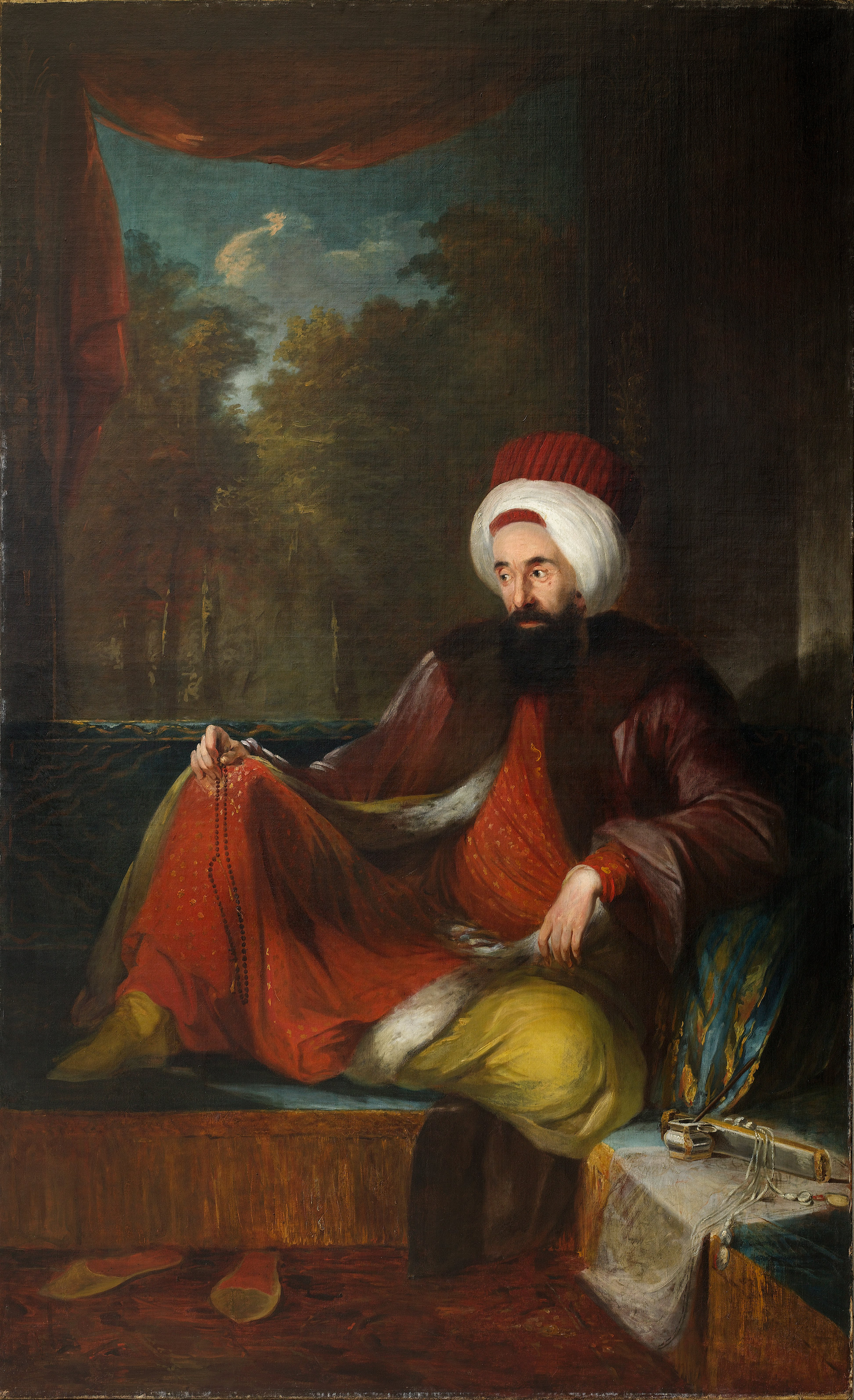
Yusuf Agah Efendi

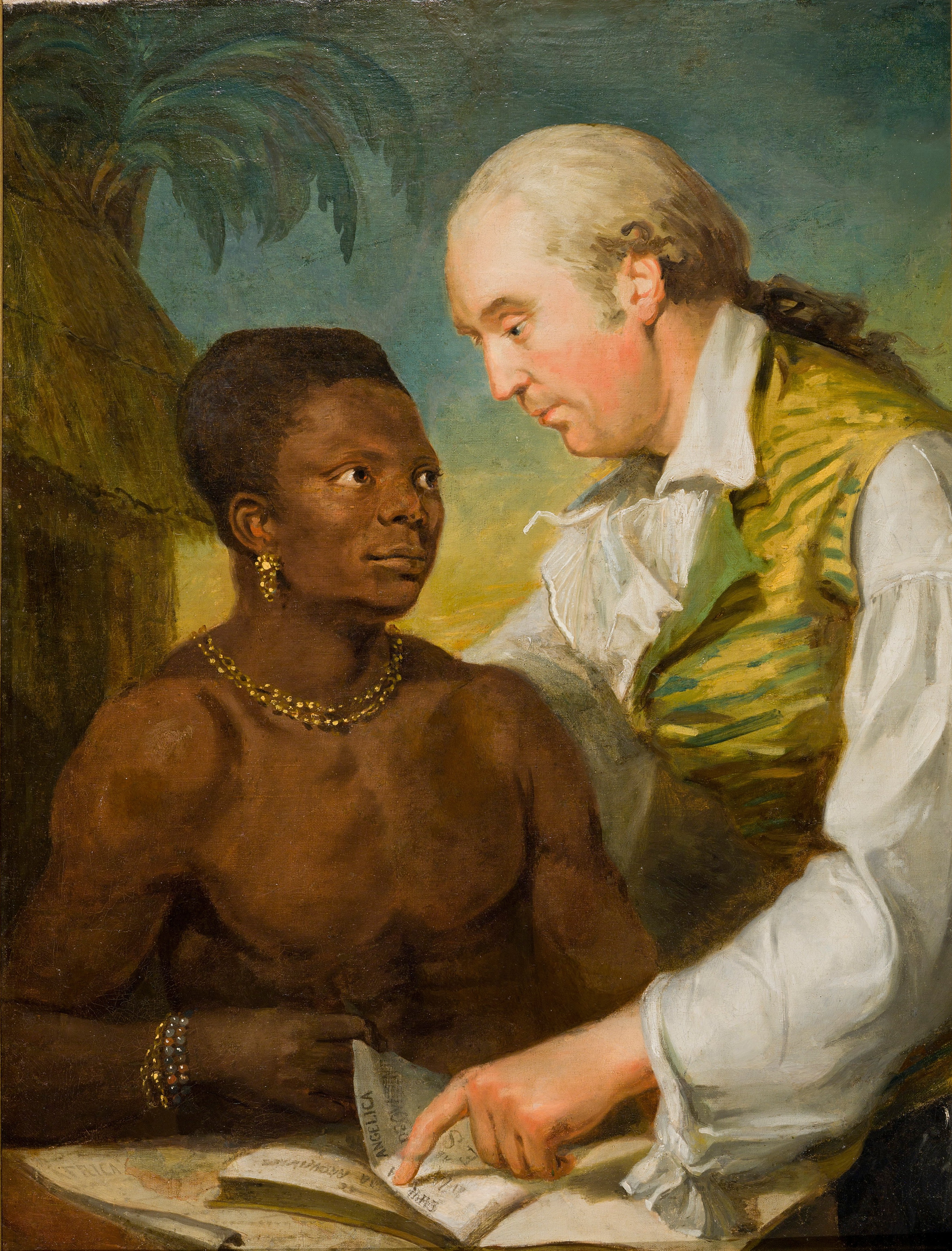
Double Portrait

== Literature ==
- Minchinton W. Scandinavian Art in England 1768-1838. Three cases. - The Northern Seas: politics, economics and culture: eight essays. Ed. by W.Minchington. 1989.
- Baird, Olga. The Lunar Society in Portraits by Carl-Fredrick von Breda: Likenesses of Life and Soul. //Birmingham Historian, Issue 30, Summer 2007. pp. 27–32.
