= George Best (MP) =

British politician

George Best DL, JP (10 November 1759 – 8 September 1818) was a British politician.

Best was the son of James Best, of Park House, Boxley, Kent, High Sheriff of Kent in 1751, by Frances, daughter of Richard Shelley, of Michaelgrove, Sussex. He sat as member of parliament for Rochester from 1790 to 1796. He was also a deputy lieutenant and justice of the peace for Kent.

Best married Caroline, daughter of Edward Scott, of Scott's Hall, Kent, in 1784. They had several children, including Dorothy Best, wife of Reverend Joseph George Brett and mother of William Brett, 1st Viscount Esher. The family lived at Chilston Park, Boughton Malherbe, Kent. Best died in September 1818, aged 58.

Parliament of Great Britain
| Preceded by Sir Charles Middleton, Bt; Nathaniel Smith | Member of Parliament for Rochester; 1790–1796; With: Sir Richard Bickerton, Bt 1790–1792; Nathaniel Smith 1792–1794; Sir Richard King, Bt 1794–1796 | Succeeded by Hon. Henry Tufton; Sir Richard King, Bt |
