= Sir Richard Bickerton, 1st Baronet =

British naval officer (1727–1792)

Rear-Admiral Sir Richard Bickerton Bt
- Born: 23 June 1727
- Died: 25 February 1792 (aged 64)
- Military career
- Allegiance: Kingdom of Great Britain
- Branch: Royal Navy
- Service years: 1746–1792
- Rank: Rear-Admiral
- Commands: Etna; Culloden; Glasgow; Lively; Renown; Marlborough; Princess Augusta; Terrible; Fortitude; Princess Augusta (again); Leeward Islands Station; Plymouth Command
- Conflicts: Battle of Ushant (1778); Battle of Cuddalore
- Other work: Member of Parliament for Rochester (1790–1792)

Rear-Admiral Sir Richard Bickerton, 1st Baronet (23 June 1727 – 25 February 1792) was a British naval officer who finished his career as a rear admiral in the Royal Navy and was ennobled as the first Baronet Bickerton of Upwood. He served in several naval engagements, and died Commander-in-Chief, Plymouth in 1792. His son Richard Hussey Bickerton, who likewise rose to flag rank in the Royal Navy, succeeded to the baronetcy following his death.

== Naval career ==
Richard Bickerton was born on 23 June 1727 in Bridgnorth, the third son of a Lieutenant in the 4th Dragoon Guards. Educated at Westminster School, he joined the navy in 1739 and served aboard Suffolk, Stirling Castle, St George, Duke, Victory and Cornwall, before being commissioned as a lieutenant on 8 February 1746 at the age of 18. He served as a Lieutenant aboard the 60-gun fourth rate Worcester in 1748. On 2 August 1758 he was appointed Master and Commander of the fireship Etna, and then on 21 August 1759 promoted to the rank of Captain and appointed to command the 74-gun third rate Culloden. However, he was swiftly removed into the much smaller 20-gun sixth rate Glasgow, in command of which he sailed on 25 April 1760 for the West Indies. Returning to England in 1761, he commanded the similar 20-gun Lively for a short while.

In 1767 Bickerton was appointed to command the 30-gun fifth rate Renown, again for employment to the West Indies. At the start of 1771 he took command of the 74-gun third rate Marlborough, remaining in this post for nearly three years. He was knighted on 24 June 1773. He subsequently commanded the Royal yacht Princess Augusta, and from October 1776 the 74-gun third rate Terrible; while aboard the latter he captured the American privateer Rising States on 15 April 1777 while cruising off Ushant. He was created a Baronet of Upwood on 29 May 1778, and while still commanding the Terrible distinguished himself at the Battle of Ushant on 27 July 1778.

In early 1780 Bickerton took command of the new 74-gun Fortitude, and later was re-appointed to the Royal yacht Princess Augusta, before hoisting his broad pendant — as a commodore — aboard the 80-gun Gibraltar in January 1782. He sailed from England on 6 February 1782 in command of a squadron of six third rates and two frigates, escorting a convoy to India. In the Indian Ocean, he joined the fleet commanded by Vice-Admiral Sir Edward Hughes, and took part in the Battle of Cuddalore on 20 June 1783. Returning to England upon the conclusion of hostilities, he hoisted his broad pendant aboard the 50-gun fourth rate Jupiter for a brief period as Commander-in-Chief on the Leeward Islands Station in 1786.

Bickerton reached flag rank on 24 September 1787, when he was appointed Rear Admiral of the Blue, and was promoted to Rear Admiral of the White on 21 September 1790, at that time flying his flag aboard the 90-gun second rate Impregnable. In the General Election of 1790, he was elected to the British House of Commons as Member of Parliament for Rochester in Kent, retaining that seat until his death from an apoplectic fit on 25 September 1792. At the time of his death he was Commander-in-Chief, Plymouth, flying his flag in the 98-gun second rate St. George.

== Family ==
In 1758 Bickerton had married Mary Anne Hussey, and the marriage produced two sons and two daughters, the former including Richard Hussey Bickerton, an equally successful naval officer who became the 2nd Baronet upon his father's death, and rose even further in the Navy's ranks to finish as Admiral of the Red.

Military offices
Preceded by Sir Richard Hughes	Commander-in-Chief, Leeward Islands Station; 1786–1787	Succeeded by Sir William Parker
Preceded by Sir Thomas Graves	Commander-in-Chief, Plymouth; 1790–1792	Succeeded by Phillips Cosby
Parliament of Great Britain
Preceded by Sir Charles Middleton; Nathaniel Smith	Member of Parliament for Rochester; 1790–1792; With: George Best	Succeeded by George Best; Nathaniel Smith
Baronetage of Great Britain
New creation	Baronet (of Upwood); 1778–1792	Succeeded by Richard Hussey Bickerton
