= James Ramsay (abolitionist) =

Scottish priest and abolitionist (1733–1789)

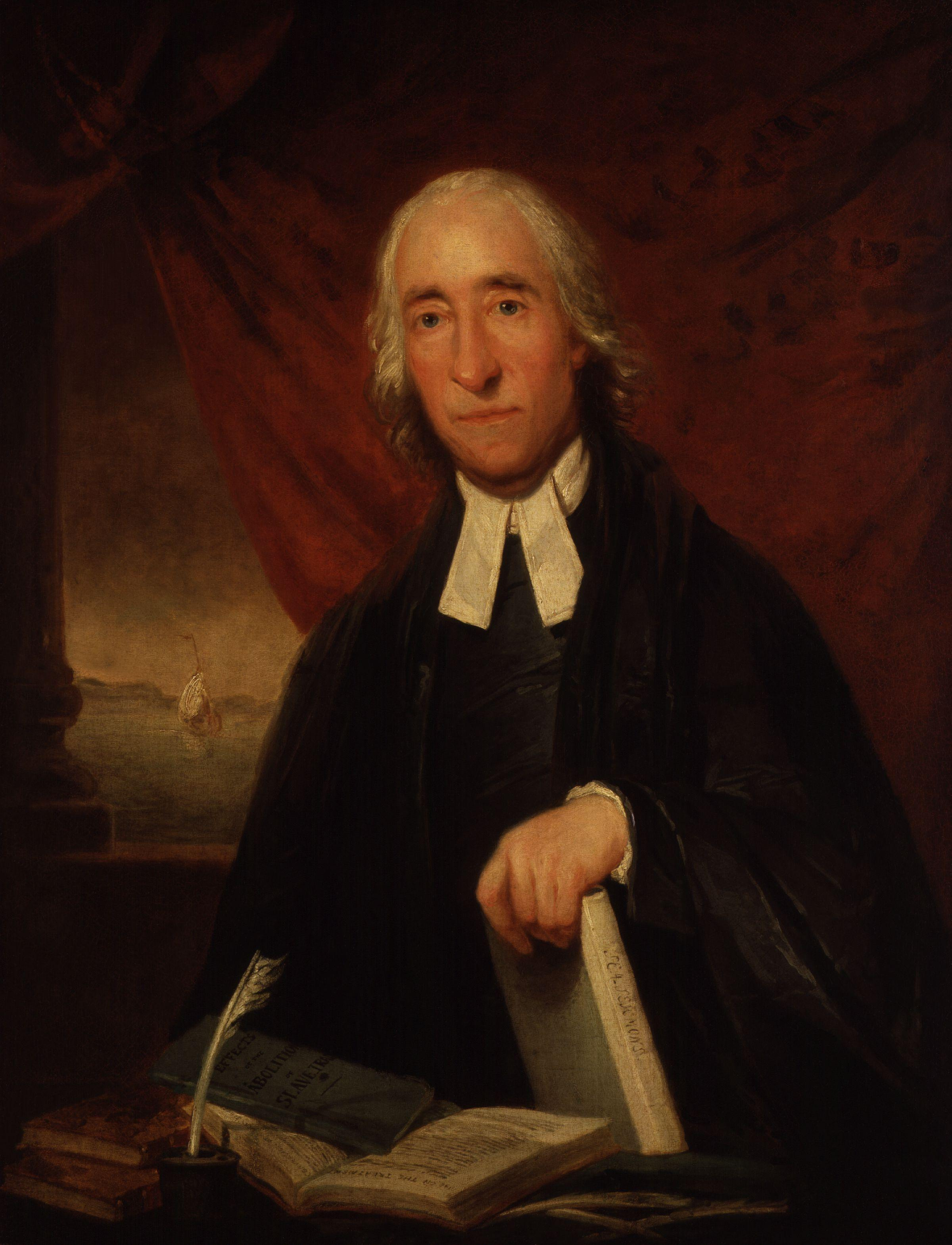
- Portrait by Carl Frederik von Breda, c. 1789
- Born: 25 July 1733; Fraserburgh, Scotland
- Died: July 1789 (aged 55–56)
- Education: King's College, Aberdeen
- Known for: Abolitionism

Rev. James Ramsay (25 July 1733 – July 1789) was a Scottish ship's surgeon, Anglican priest, and leading abolitionist in Great Britain.

== Early life and naval service ==
Ramsay was born at Fraserburgh, Aberdeenshire, Scotland, the son of William Ramsay, ship's carpenter, and Margaret Ogilvie of Angus. Apprenticed to a local surgeon, and later educated at King's College, Aberdeen, from 1750 to 1755, he obtained his MA degree in 1753 and went on to continue his surgical training in London under Dr George Macaulay.

Having entered the Navy in 1757, Ramsay served as surgeon aboard HMS Arundel in the West Indies, under the command of Sir Charles Middleton. In November 1759, the Arundel intercepted a British slave ship, the Swift and, on boarding the vessel, Ramsay found over 100 enslaved people living in the most inhumane conditions. Such was the scene of filth and degradation he witnessed, that this incident was to have a lasting effect on Ramsay. While serving at sea he fell and fractured his thigh bone, and was disqualified from future service, remaining lame for the remainder of his life.

== Ordination and work in the West Indies ==
In July 1761 Ramsay left the navy to take holy orders. He was ordained into the Anglican church in November 1761 by the Bishop of London. Choosing to work among enslaved people on the Caribbean, he travelled to the island of Saint Christopher (now Saint Kitts), where he was appointed to St. John's, Capisterre in 1762, and to Christ Church Nichola Town, the following year.

James Ramsay married Rebecca Akers, the daughter of Edmund Akers, a plantation owner on St Kitts, in 1763. They had one son and three daughters. Their son died young of small-pox, having caught the disease from his father, who had been volunteering on a ship that had that disease on board "and had carried home the infection in his clothes". One of their daughters, Margaret, (1766 – Newtown, Ireland, April 1839) married Robert Smith (1754 – Chatham, Kent, 2 July 1813), a Major in the Royal Marines. Robert and Margaret Smith's daughter, Catherine Rebecca Smith (1796 – 10 October 1856), married Sir Thomas Osborne, 9th Baronet, on 6 April 1816 at St. Margaret's Church, Rochester, Kent. James and Rebecca Ramsay's youngest daughter, Jane, married her cousin Aretas Akers. One of their descendants was Aretas Akers-Douglas, 1st Viscount Chilston.

Ramsay set out by welcoming both black and white parishioners into his church, with the aim of converting enslaved people to Christianity. As well as pastoring the members of his church he practised medicine and surgery, providing a free service to the poor of the community. Having been appointed surgeon to several plantations on the island, he was able to see firsthand the conditions under which the enslaved people laboured and the brutality of many of the planters.

He strongly criticised the cruel treatment and punishment meted out to enslaved people, and became more convinced of the need to improve their conditions. This led him into involvement in local government, but he was the target of much antagonism and personal attack from the planters, who resented his interference, because of his measures to ameliorate the conditions of enslaved people. His letters to the bishop of London illustrate the attitudes of the American colonists in the late 18th century.

Ramsay left St Kitts in 1777, exhausted by the continuing conflict with influential planters and businessmen. He returned to Britain and briefly lived with Sir Charles Middleton at Teston, Kent where Lady Middleton joined the cause of the campaign against the slave trade.

He briefly rejoined the navy in April 1778, accepting a chaplaincy in the West Indies with Admiral Barrington, where he was engaged in intelligence gathering against the French. He returned to Britain in 1780 at the suggestion of Middleton, by then Comptroller of the Navy, with the intention of helping his radical reform of the Navy Board and as his personal secretary. He was installed as Vicar of Teston and Vicar and Rector of Nettlestead, Kent, these valuable positions being in the gift of Middleton.

== Abolitionist activity ==
During the following three years Ramsay worked on his most significant An Essay on the Treatment and Conversion of African Slaves in the British Sugar Colonies, published in 1784. It was this essay that influenced Beilby Porteus, Bishop of Chester and later Bishop of London, in his campaign to improve the conditions of enslaved people held by the Society for the Propagation of the Gospel in Foreign Parts, as well as bringing to public notice the debate about the slave trade. Ramsay contributed several further publications to the campaign, including An Inquiry into the Effects of Putting a Stop to the African Slave Trade, published in 1784.

Ramsay became an early member of the Testonites, a group of influential politicians, philanthropists and churchmen, who met at Barham Court in Teston, the home of Sir Charles Middleton and Lady Middleton. He was persuaded by Lady Middleton, Sir Charles Middleton, and others to publish his account of the horrors of the slave trade. This was the first time that the British public had read an anti-slavery work by a mainstream Anglican writer who had witnessed the suffering of enslaved people on the West-Indian plantations.

Again he was severely challenged by the plantation owners in England who were threatened by his anti-slavery works and who attempted to refute his allegations, in many cases with vitriolic attacks on Ramsay's reputation and character, leading to a pamphlet war between the parties.

He met with William Pitt the Younger, the prime minister, on several occasions and with William Wilberforce in 1783 and played a significant part in the establishment of the campaign against the slave trade. It was Ramsay's meeting with Thomas Clarkson in 1786 that encouraged the latter in his tireless efforts to obtain first-hand evidence of the trade, and indirectly led to the formation of the Society for the Abolition of the Slave Trade the following year.

== Legacy ==
Hugely influential in the growing anti-slavery movement, Ramsay did not live to see the fruition of the campaign. He died in July 1789 and was buried at Teston. James Watt has argued: "His enemies acknowledged his exemplary qualities, while deploring the intemperate language of his books; and the abolition of the British slave trade in 1807 probably owed more to James Ramsay's personal integrity, ethical arguments, and constructive proposals than to any other influence."

== Works ==
- An Essay on the Treatment and Conversion of African Slaves in the British Sugar Colonies (1784)
- An Inquiry Into the Effects of Putting a Stop to the African Slave Trade: And of Granting Liberty to the Slaves in the British Sugar Colonies (1784)

== See also ==
- Abolitionism in the United Kingdom
- List of abolitionist forerunners
- Christian abolitionism
