= HMS Terrible (1762) =

Ship of the line of the Royal Navy

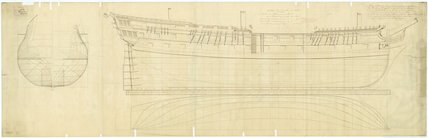
- Terrible

History

Great Britain
- Name: HMS Terrible
- Ordered: 8 January 1761
- Builder: John Barnard, Harwich Dockyard
- Launched: 4 September 1762
- Fate: Burned, 1781
- Notes: Participated in: First Battle of Ushant; Battle of Cape St Vincent; Battle of the Chesapeake

General characteristics
- Class & type: Ramillies-class ship of the line
- Tons burthen: 1644
- Length: 168 ft 6 in (51.36 m) (gundeck)
- Beam: 46 ft 11 in (14.30 m)
- Depth of hold: 19 ft 9 in (6.02 m)
- Propulsion: Sails
- Sail plan: Full-rigged ship
- Armament: 74 guns: Gundeck: 28 × 32 pdrs; Upper gundeck: 28 × 18 pdrs; Quarterdeck: 14 × 9 pdrs; Forecastle: 4 × 9 pdrs

HMS Terrible was a 74-gun third rate ship of the line of the Royal Navy, built by John Barnard and launched on 4 September 1762 at King's Yard in Harwich, as a sister ship to HMS Arrogant.

In the English Channel, on 15 April 1777, under Captain Richard Bickerton, she took an American privateer brig called the Rising States, Capt Thompson.

In 1778 she fought at the First Battle of Ushant, and in 1781 Terrible (Capt. Finch) was part of Sir Thomas Graves' fleet at the Battle of the Chesapeake. During the course of the battle, she took heavy damage, and was scuttled, or deliberately sunk, after the battle had ended.

== Notable Commanders ==
- Mariot Arbuthnot 1770 to 1773
- Sir Richard Bickerton, 1st Baronet 1776 to 1779
- John Leigh Douglas 1779 to 1780
- John Thomas Duckworth 1780 to 1781
- Henry Edwyn Stanhope 1781
