= Robert Gregory (MP) =

Irish-born East India merchant and British politician

Robert Gregory (1727 – 1 September 1810) was a British East India merchant and politician who sat in the British House of Commons from 1768 to 1784.

Robert was the only son of Mary Shawe and her husband Henry Gregory of Galway youngest son of Captain George Gregory of Killerida, Co. Kerry, the hero of the Siege of Derry. Robert went to India where he served with Honourable East India Company and made a considerable fortune. In 1766 he returned from India and settled in Kent. In 1768, he acquired the Coole Park estate of 8,000 acres near Gort in County Galway in Ireland and built a house there.

Gregory was a Member of Parliament (MP) for Maidstone from 18 March 1768 – 8 October 1774. He was then MP for Rochester, Kent from 7 October 1774 to 1 April 1784. He was also a director of the East India Company between 1769 and 1782 and then chairman briefly before he retired through ill-health.

Gregory married Maria Auchmuty, daughter of an official of the East India Company, and they had three sons. Of these, William Gregory was civil Under-Secretary for Ireland from 1812 to 1830 and was the father of another Robert Gregory, who died in 1847 from a disease he contracted ministering to his sick tenants in the Great Famine. He in turn was the father of William Henry Gregory.

Parliament of Great Britain
Preceded by Rose Fuller with William Northey	MP for Maidstone with Charles Marsham, 1st Earl of Romney; Horatio Mann; 1768–1774	Succeeded by Horatio Mann with Heneage Finch, 4th Earl of Aylesford
Preceded by George Finch-Hatton	MP for Rochester with George Finch-Hatton; 1774–1784	Succeeded by Charles Middleton, 1st Baron Barham with Nathaniel Smith
