= Testonites =

The Testonites were an influential group of English abolitionists active in the latter part of the eighteenth century.

The group of activists is named after Teston, Kent, where they began to meet at Barham Court, the home of Elizabeth Bouverie and country residence of Charles Middleton, 1st Baron Barham, and Margaret Middleton (née Gambier), Lady Middleton, in the early 1780s.

The informal group came together soon after James Ramsay, a former naval officer, who chose to take holy orders and work on the Caribbean island of St Christopher (now St Kitts), returned to England in 1781.

In the West Indies, Ramsay witnessed and was shocked by the cruelty inflicted upon the enslaved Africans and campaigned against the owners and planters who were largely responsible. Ramsay was offered the livings of Teston and Nettlestead, Kent in 1781.

Other significant campaigners who became part of the Teston circle were Hannah More, philanthropist and writer; anti-slavery campaigner Beilby Porteus, Bishop of Chester, who also held the living of the nearby village of Hunton, Kent and had been influenced by Ramsay's writings; Samuel Johnson, poet, playwright, essayist, moralist, literary critic, sermonist, biographer, editor, and lexicographer; and John Newton, Anglican cleric and slavery abolitionist; as well as Charles and Margaret Middleton.

Their activism was instrumental in "channel[ing] the reform currents that shaped the cultural landscape in Britain", and, through the influence they exerted on such men as Thomas Clarkson, they were indirectly responsible for the founding of the Society for Effecting the Abolition of the Slave Trade in May 1787. Clarkson had pledged his energies to a national campaign for slave trade abolition in the autumn of the previous year.

Closely associated with the group later was the young William Wilberforce, (MP for Kingston upon Hull and then Yorkshire), who first met the group during the winter of 1786–87. He later went on to steer through Parliament the legislation that finally led, almost twenty years later, to the passage of the Slave Trade Act in 1807.

Following the death of Margaret Middleton in 1792 the Testonites declined as an active slavery abolitionist group and the centre for activism passed to the Clapham Sect.
